= February 2019 North American winter storm =

Winter storm in 2019

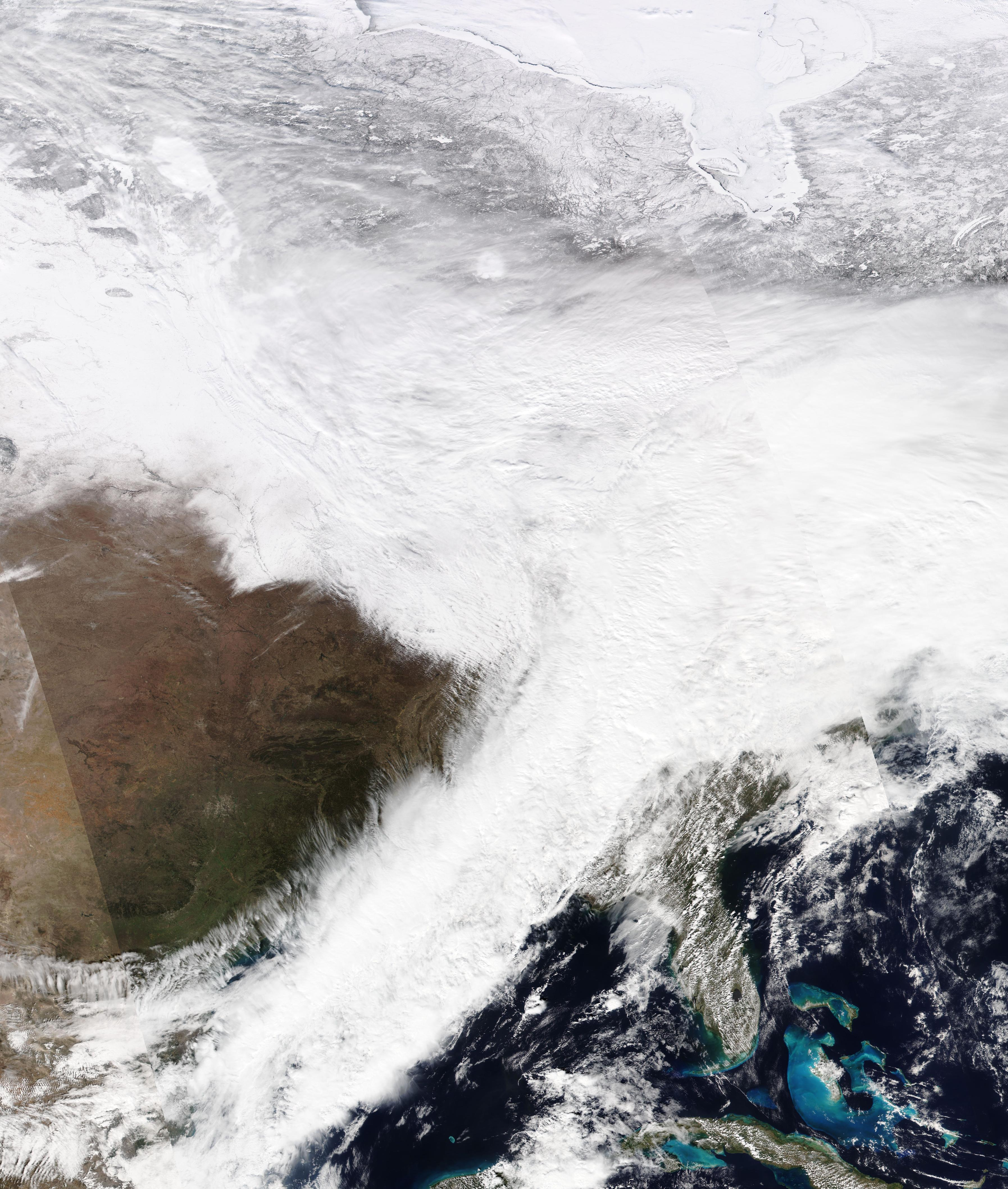

Meteorological history
- Formed: February 11, 2019
- Dissipated: February 13, 2019

Extratropical cyclone

Winter storm
- Max. snowfall: Snow — 26.5 in (67 cm) at Negaunee, Michigan; Ice — 0.5 in (1.3 cm) in North Toledo, Ohio

Overall effects
- Fatalities: 1
- Areas affected: Midwestern United States, Northeastern United States, Eastern Canada
- Power outages: >70,000
- Part of the 2018–19 North American winter

The February 2019 North American winter storm was one of three powerful winter storms that affected the continent in early February. This storm, in particular, paralyzed travel in parts of the Midwest, Northeast as well as Eastern Canada.

== Meteorological history ==
An area of low pressure from the Pacific made landfall and tracked towards the Northern Plains by February 11, 2019. Afterward, the storm affected the Great Lakes region and the Northeast before heading north into Atlantic Canada and eventually, moving out to sea.

== Impacts ==
=== Western United States ===
Heavy snow in central Washington lead to the closures of US Route 2 and Interstate 90. Interstate 82 closed in similar areas as well. At Seattle–Tacoma International Airport, Alaska Airlines cancelled 1,100 flights and suffered $15 million in losses. The winter storm killed 1600 cows in the Yakima Valley. In Southern California, Interstate 5 shut down north of Los Angeles due to the inclement weather.

=== Northern Plains ===
Roads and windshields were coated with ice as a result of a period of freezing drizzle in the Kearney, Nebraska area.

=== Midwest ===
Several accidents were reported on the I-94 in Wisconsin. Certain highways in Eastern Iowa were left impassible February 12 (the day after the storm) due to a combination of fresh snowfall and strong winds, which resulted in blowing and drifting snow. Negaunee, Michigan received 26.5 inches (67 centimetres) of snowfall. Ice accretion in Northern Illinois and Northern Ohio downed power lines, leaving over 70,000 ComEd customers and some in Henry and Williams counties (Northwestern Ohio) without power.

=== Northeast ===
Significant ice accretion, more than a quarter-inch thick, occurred in West Virginia, Pennsylvania and Maryland, damaging trees and causing isolated power outages. Boston experienced their largest snowfall thus far this season, with 2.7 inches (6.9 centimetres). Over a foot of snow fell in Upstate New York, Northern Vermont, Northern New Hampshire and Western Maine. Further south, 1.0 inch (2.5 centimetres) of snow fell in New York City. A person was killed in a traffic crash relating to the storm in New Jersey.

=== Eastern Canada ===
With 35 centimetres (14 inches) of snow in the forecast for Southern Ontario and Southern Quebec, widespread school and business closures ensued. 70 km/h northwesterly winds following the storm brought lake effect snow squalls, further increasing snowfall totals. Residents complained of Toronto's snow removal operations.

== See also ==
- January 2019 North American winter storm – another crippling winter storm that affected similar areas two weeks prior
- January–February 2019 North American cold wave – disruptive coldwave occurring simultaneously to the storm
