= Eric Berger (journalist) =

American journalist and meteorologist

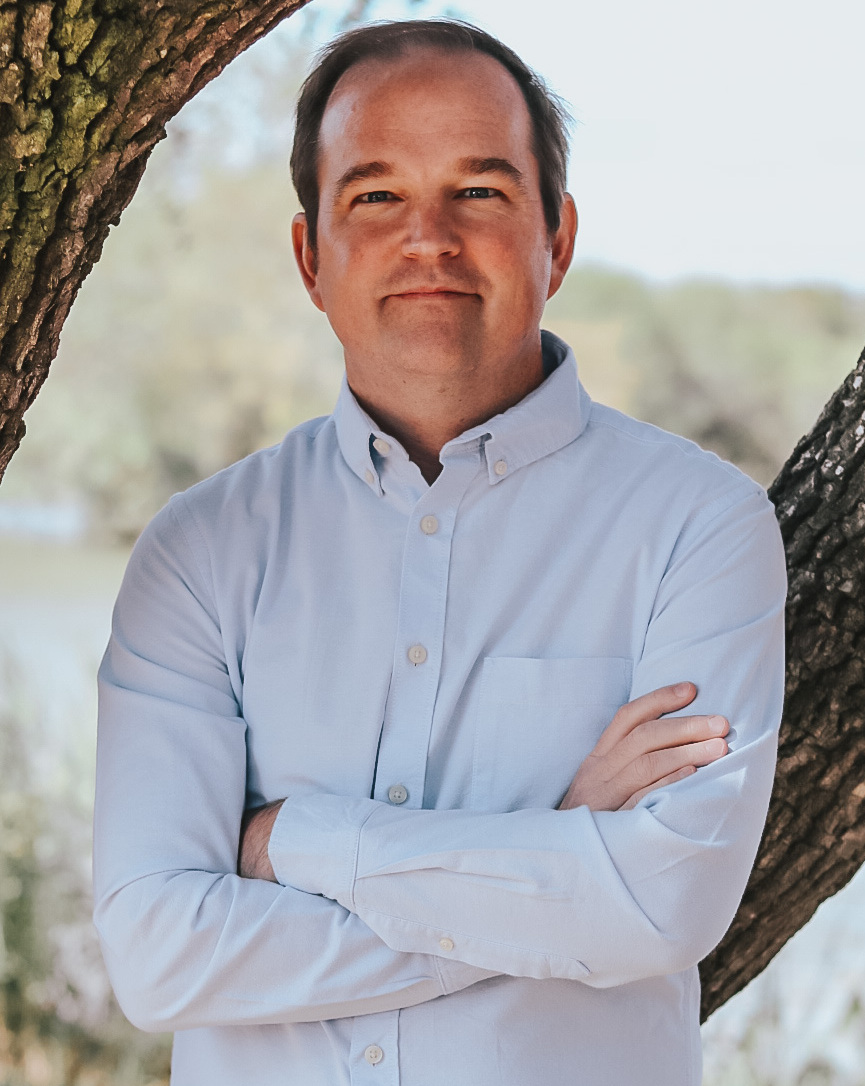
- Berger in 2020
- Born: April 19, 1973 (age 53); Michigan, U.S.
- Education: University of Texas at Austin (BA); University of Missouri (MA); Mississippi State University
- Occupations: Journalist; meteorologist; author
- Years active: 1998–present
- Known for: Ars Technica, senior space editor; Space City Weather, editor
- Notable work: Liftoff; Reentry

Eric Berger (born April 19, 1973) is an American journalist and meteorologist who is the senior space editor at Ars Technica and the editor of Space City Weather, a website covering weather in Houston.

== Early life, education, and family ==
Berger, who was raised in Michigan, graduated from the University of Texas at Austin in 1995 with a bachelor's degree in astronomy. Berger then attended graduate school at the University of Missouri where he received a master's degree in journalism. In 2014, Berger completed a distance learning program at Mississippi State University to become a certified meteorologist. Berger lives in League City, Texas, with his wife, Amanda, and two daughters.

== Career ==
=== Science journalism ===
Berger began working at the Houston Chronicle in 1998. He started his career at the Chronicle as a general assignments reporter before transitioning to the science desk in late 2001. In 2005, he launched a science and technology blog on the Houston Chronicle website called SciGuy, which focused primarily on chemistry, physics, and astronomy. Berger also began writing about weather during his time at the Chronicle. Berger's coverage of Hurricane Ike contributed to the staff of the Houston Chronicle becoming a nominated finalist for the Pulitzer Prize for Breaking News Reporting in 2009.

After leaving the Houston Chronicle and joining Ars Technica, Berger also started the Space City Weather blog in October 2015. The blog, which is operated jointly by Berger and forecast meteorologist Matt Lanza, provides weather forecasts for the Greater Houston area. The blog's readership increased drastically during Hurricane Harvey, with over one million visits to the site on August 27, 2017. In recognition of Berger and Lanza's service to Houston as weather forecasters, the mayor of Houston, Sylvester Turner, declared June 8, 2021, as "Space City Weather Day".

=== Space industry journalism ===
In October 2015, Berger left the Houston Chronicle to write for Ars Technica. As the senior space editor at Ars, Berger's primary focus is on NASA and private aerospace companies. Berger authored Liftoff, which was published by William Morrow and Company and released in March 2021. The book chronicles the early history of SpaceX and the protracted development program of the Falcon 1 launch vehicle. He released a sequel in 2024, Reentry, that details the rise of the company through the first Falcon 9 launch, the development of the Dragon capsule, the inaugural Falcon Heavy launch, and the company's first human spaceflight.
