= January 2019 North American winter storm =

Meteorological history
- Formed: January 16, 2019
- Dissipated: January 21, 2019

Category 1 "Notable" winter storm
- Regional snowfall index: 2.83 (NOAA)
- Highest gusts: 164 mph (264 km/h) at Mammoth Mountain, California
- Max. snowfall: 52 inches (130 cm) at Squaw Valley, California

Tornado outbreak
- Tornadoes: 10
- Max. rating: EF2 tornado
- Highest winds: 132 mph (212 km/h) at Mammoth Mountain, California

Overall effects
- Fatalities: 10
- Areas affected: Southwestern United States, Rocky Mountains, Midwest, Northeastern United States, Eastern Canada
- Power outages: 100,000+
- Part of the 2018–19 North American winter

The January 2019 North American winter storm was a long-lived winter storm, forming as a large area of low pressure off the Pacific Northwest shoreline January 16, making its way to the Northeast by January 21. Its effects included heavy rain/high elevation snow and gusty winds in California, severe weather in the south, near-blizzard conditions in Upstate New York, an ice storm in New England and minor coastal flooding in the Mid-Atlantic.

== Meteorological history ==
A large area of low pressure formed just off the coast of the Pacific Northwest on January 16, before making landfall in California on January 17. Very heavy, high-elevation snow fell in the Sierra Nevada and Rocky Mountain ranges. The storm tracked across the Great Plains and through the Midwest before delivering heavy snow to the mountains of Upstate New York and Northern New England, eventually moving through Atlantic Canada and drifting out to sea. The winter storm was unofficially named Winter Storm Harper by The Weather Channel.

== Impacts ==
=== Western United States ===
==== California ====
The storm entered North America, moving inland over California, on January 16 and 17. Moisture from the storm caused heavy, high elevation snow in the Sierra Nevada mountain range, peaking at 52 inches (130 cm) in Squaw Valley. The high winds and heavy snow amounts caused several car accidents, resulting in the closure of Interstate 80 through the Sierra Nevada. Winds gusted up to 164 miles per hour (264 km/h) at the top of Mammoth Mountain. Due to the high winds, there were nearly 100,000 power outages.

==== Colorado ====
The Rocky Mountains in Colorado also experienced heavy snow, although lighter than in California. Spicer received 11.7 inches (30 cm) of snow, while Glendevey and Rabbit Ears Pass totaled 7.8 inches (20 cm).

=== Midwestern United States ===
==== North Dakota and South Dakota ====
Light to moderate snow and gusty winds affected travel across the states, especially across Interstate 90. Southeastern portions of the state received localized amounts of over one foot of snow.

==== Nebraska ====
A Southwest Airlines plane slid off a runway in Eppley Airfield in Omaha, causing the airport to temporarily close, and all flights there diverted or cancelled. Ponca received 12.5 inches (32 cm) of snow.

==== Iowa ====
Sioux City set a daily snowfall and liquid record for January 18, with 6.2 inches (16 cm) of snow and 0.54 inches (1.4 cm), beating previous records set in 1975. Bluffton received 14 inches (36 cm) of snow, while Cresco had 13 inches (33 cm) and Decorah totaled 11.8 inches (30 cm).

==== Missouri ====
A 15-car accident occurred on Interstate 55 during snowy conditions and reduced visibility in the south-central part of the state. Multiple accidents occurred on Interstate 44.

==== Illinois ====
A United Airlines plane slid off a runway while landing at O'Hare International Airport in Chicago. There were no injuries, though more than 100 passengers were assisted off the plane after it skidded into a grassy area.

==== Indiana ====
Ice accumulation followed a period of freezing rain, including 0.33 inches (8.4 mm) of ice that accumulated near River Forest. Snow accumulated 9 inches southeast of Bedford. Winds gusted as high as 40 miles per hour (64 km/h), creating whiteout conditions.

==== Minnesota ====
In Minnesota, there were five reported collisions with snow plows by cars in 24 hours. Mapleton received 12.5 inches (32 cm) of snow, while Winnebago recorded 12 inches (30 cm) and Manchester totaled 11 inches (28 cm). Snowfall rates of 1–2 inches per hour were recorded, and northeast winds gusting over 30 miles per hour (48 km/h) caused blowing and drifting snow.

=== Northeastern United States ===
==== New York ====
A band of heavy snow resulted in the accumulation of 1 to 2 feet (30 to 61 cm) of snow in Upstate New York, primarily in the mountains. Isolated amounts over 21 inches (53 cm) were recorded along eastern portions of the Adirondack Mountains in Essex County. The highest total came near Rochester, where 29.2 inches (74 cm) of snow fell.

==== Vermont and New Hampshire ====
Heavy snow fell in much of both states on January 20 and 21, with the Burlington International Airport receiving 18.6 inches (47 cm), with 15.6 inches (40 cm) falling on January 20 alone.

===== Connecticut =====
Snow covering Bradley International Airport following the event

Ice and snow accumulations were reported. Ice accumulations peaked at 1/6 of an inch, while snow accumulations were as high as 6.2 inches (16 cm) in Bakersville and near New Hartford. Ice damage was reported in Middletown and Newtown, and 30,000 power outages were attributed to the ice, including 100 percent of power out in Bethany. 1 death occurred in Middletown when a person was pinned under his vehicle, which slid down his driveway due to the ice. In Bethel, a road was closed to school buses because of water freezing into ice, into which the road was steep, and included several curves, fearing a crash. The Connecticut State Police reported windshields shattered due to the ice.

====== Massachusetts ======
Accumulations of ice and snow were experienced around Massachusetts. Springfield reported a quarter inch of ice accretion, and Savoy received 20.3 inches (52 cm). Additional accumulations of 10 inches (25 cm) were reported in Leyden and Cummington. While snow plows were clearing snow-covered roads, one caught fire in Stow, with no injuries or deaths reported during the incident. In Cape Cod, mostly rain occurred.

====== Maine ======
The heaviest snow in the Northeast from the storm fell in Maine, which fell on January 20 and 21, with some localities reporting more than 2 feet (60 cm+) of snow. Caribou recorded 18.2 inches (46 cm), with 16.9 inches (43 cm) on January 20 alone, the highest accumulation of snow in that area since 2005. After the storm's passing, blowing and drifting snow still persisted, leading to high snow drifts several feet deep along portions of U.S. Route 1. Sugarloaf received 20 inches (51 cm) of snow in 24 hours. Farmington and Rockland totaled 14 inches (36 cm) inches of snow.

====== Pennsylvania ======
Pennsylvania Governor Tom Wolf declared a state of emergency ahead of the storm, expecting snowfall rates up to 2 inches (5 cm) per hour. A 24-hour commercial vehicle ban was put in place for all interstates besides I-95, although speed limits were reduced. Shelters were opened in Harrisburg. 14 inches (36 cm) of snow fell south of Deposit, with 12 inches (30 cm) falling in 24 hours near Mount Pleasant. Coudersport received 13 inches (33 cm). Despite the high amounts of snow, this was well below the expected amount of snow that would have fallen in Pennsylvania.

====== New Jersey ======
A state of emergency was declared days before the storm hit. Winter storm watches were issued primarily for northern portions of the state. Snow accumulations, like Pennsylvania, were below the expected amount of snow in New Jersey, with the highest total coming from Ramsey, which received 2.2 inches (5.6 cm) of snow. Westwood totaled 0.5 inches (1.3 cm) of snow, though this was enough to create a slushy mess. There were at least 340 power outages in Morris County, with 263 of them occurring in North Arlington. There were at least 163 accidents and 311 motorist aids.

=== Tornado outbreak in the southeast ===
At the southern end of the cold front, multiple states in the southeast and on the Gulf Coast were impacted by a small, early-season tornado outbreak. 10 tornadoes touched down across the affected states.

==== Arkansas ====
A hailstorm struck Foreman 30 minutes past midnight CST. The hailstorm, which was not severe weather-warned, produced golf ball-sized hail that severely impacted residential areas and commercial buildings in the area.

==== Louisiana ====
An EF1 tornado, with 105 mph winds, uprooted trees and damaged homes in Washington Parish. A hailstorm struck Denham Springs. While a severe thunderstorm warning was issued in the area, the hail, in addition to 60 miles per hour (97 km/h) wind gusts, which were 2.75 inches (7.0 cm) wide, was enough to damage residential areas, commercial buildings, roofs, and vehicles.

==== Mississippi ====
Rankin County was hit with an EF0 tornado earlier in the day before being struck again, this time by an EF1 tornado, a few hours later.

==== Alabama ====
The town of Wetumpka was impacted by an EF2 tornado. The town's mayor, Jerry Willis said at a news conference that the town "suffered a tremendous amount of damage." Four injuries were reported. The historic First Presbyterian Church in Wetumpka was destroyed. The state was hit with two other tornadoes, both rated EF1, touching down in Autauga and Coosa counties.

==== Florida ====
Tyndall AFB, which had already been devastated by Hurricane Michael three months prior, was struck by an EF1 tornado, flipping dumpsters, ripping roofs off barracks, and moving a car.

== See also ==
- March 2019 North American blizzard – another powerful winter storm/blizzard that affected the United States and Eastern Canada less than 2 months after
- January 2019 North American cold wave – the cold wave that followed this winter storm
