= Climate of Houston =

Houston

Climate chart (precipitation, max. and min. temperature)
J	F	M	A	M	J	J	A	S	O	N	D
3.4 63 43	3.2 66 47	3.4 73 53	3.3 80 59	5.1 86 68	5.9 91 73	5 94 75	4.9 95 75	5 90 70	5.7 82 61	4.3 73 52	3.7 64 45
- █ Average max. and min. temperatures in °F
- █ Precipitation totals in inches
- Source: NOAA
Metric conversion
J	F	M	A	M	J	J	A	S	O	N	D
86 17 6	81 19 8	87 23 11	84 26 15	129 30 20	151 33 23	127 34 24	124 35 24	127 32 21	145 28 16	110 23 11	95 18 7
- █ Average max. and min. temperatures in °C
- █ Precipitation totals in mm

Houston experiences a humid subtropical climate (Köppen climate classification Cfa), influenced by its proximity to the Gulf of Mexico and low elevation. The city's climate is characterized by hot, humid summers and mild winters.

== Temperature patterns ==
The city exhibits distinct seasonal temperature variations throughout the year. August represents the peak of Houston's summer season, with average temperatures reaching 95 °F (35 °C), making it the warmest month annually. Conversely, January marks the coolest month, with average high temperatures of 63 °F (17 °C), representing the city's winter season.

== Seasonal characteristics ==
Houston's subtropical climate produces hot, humid conditions during summer months, while winter temperatures remain relatively mild compared to northern latitudes. The city's location along the Gulf Coast moderates extreme temperature fluctuations and contributes to year-round humidity levels.

== Seasonal observation ==
Climate data for Houston (Intercontinental Airport), 1991–2020 normals, (Note: Mean monthly maxima and minima (i.e. the highest and lowest temperature readings during an entire month or year) calculated based on data at said location from 1991 to 2020.) extremes 1888–present (Note: Official records for Houston were kept at the Weather Bureau in downtown from July 1888 to May 1969, and at Intercontinental since June 1969.)
Month	Jan	Feb	Mar	Apr	May	Jun	Jul	Aug	Sep	Oct	Nov	Dec	Year
Record high °F (°C)	85 (29)	91 (33)	96 (36)	95 (35)	99 (37)	107 (42)	105 (41)	109 (43)	109 (43)	99 (37)	89 (32)	85 (29)	109 (43)
Mean maximum °F (°C)	78.9 (26.1)	81.2 (27.3)	85.4 (29.7)	88.6 (31.4)	93.8 (34.3)	97.8 (36.6)	99.1 (37.3)	101.2 (38.4)	97.3 (36.3)	92.2 (33.4)	84.9 (29.4)	80.7 (27.1)	102.1 (38.9)
Mean daily maximum °F (°C)	63.8 (17.7)	67.8 (19.9)	74.0 (23.3)	80.1 (26.7)	86.9 (30.5)	92.3 (33.5)	94.5 (34.7)	94.9 (34.9)	90.4 (32.4)	82.8 (28.2)	72.6 (22.6)	65.3 (18.5)	80.5 (26.9)
Daily mean °F (°C)	53.8 (12.1)	57.7 (14.3)	63.8 (17.7)	70.0 (21.1)	77.4 (25.2)	83.0 (28.3)	85.1 (29.5)	85.2 (29.6)	80.5 (26.9)	71.8 (22.1)	62.0 (16.7)	55.4 (13.0)	70.5 (21.4)
Mean daily minimum °F (°C)	43.7 (6.5)	47.6 (8.7)	53.6 (12.0)	59.8 (15.4)	67.8 (19.9)	73.7 (23.2)	75.7 (24.3)	75.4 (24.1)	70.6 (21.4)	60.9 (16.1)	51.5 (10.8)	45.6 (7.6)	60.5 (15.8)
Mean minimum °F (°C)	27.5 (−2.5)	31.6 (−0.2)	35.0 (1.7)	43.4 (6.3)	53.8 (12.1)	66.5 (19.2)	70.5 (21.4)	70.0 (21.1)	58.3 (14.6)	44.1 (6.7)	34.2 (1.2)	30.0 (−1.1)	26.0 (−3.3)
Record low °F (°C)	5 (−15)	6 (−14)	21 (−6)	31 (−1)	42 (6)	52 (11)	62 (17)	54 (12)	45 (7)	29 (−2)	19 (−7)	7 (−14)	5 (−15)
Average precipitation inches (mm)	3.76 (96)	2.97 (75)	3.47 (88)	3.95 (100)	5.01 (127)	6.00 (152)	3.77 (96)	4.84 (123)	4.71 (120)	5.46 (139)	3.87 (98)	4.03 (102)	51.84 (1,317)
Average snowfall inches (cm)	0.0 (0.0)	0.0 (0.0)	0.0 (0.0)	0.0 (0.0)	0.0 (0.0)	0.0 (0.0)	0.0 (0.0)	0.0 (0.0)	0.0 (0.0)	0.0 (0.0)	0.0 (0.0)	0.1 (0.25)	0.1 (0.25)
Average precipitation days (≥ 0.01 in)	10.0	8.8	8.8	7.3	8.6	10.0	9.1	8.5	8.4	7.7	7.6	9.6	104.4
Average snowy days (≥ 0.1 in)	0.0	0.0	0.0	0.0	0.0	0.0	0.0	0.0	0.0	0.0	0.0	0.1	0.1
Average relative humidity (%)	74.7	73.4	72.7	73.1	75.0	74.6	74.4	75.1	76.8	75.4	76.0	75.5	74.7
Average dew point °F (°C)	41.5 (5.3)	44.2 (6.8)	51.3 (10.7)	57.7 (14.3)	65.1 (18.4)	70.3 (21.3)	72.1 (22.3)	72.0 (22.2)	68.5 (20.3)	59.5 (15.3)	51.4 (10.8)	44.8 (7.1)	58.2 (14.6)
Mean monthly sunshine hours	143.4	155.0	192.5	209.8	249.2	281.3	293.9	270.5	236.5	228.8	168.3	148.7	2,577.9
Percentage possible sunshine	44	50	52	54	59	67	68	66	64	64	53	47	58
Average ultraviolet index	3.5	5.0	7.1	8.6	9.6	10.3	9.9	9.5	8.1	5.9	4.0	3.2	7.0
Source 1: NOAA (relative humidity and dew point 1969–1990, sun 1961–1990)
Source 2: UV Index Today (1995 to 2022)

Climate data for Houston (William P. Hobby Airport), 1981–2010 normals, extremes 1941–present
Month	Jan	Feb	Mar	Apr	May	Jun	Jul	Aug	Sep	Oct	Nov	Dec	Year
Record high °F (°C)	92 (33)	97 (36)	103 (39)	101 (38)	104 (40)	105 (41)	104 (40)	109 (43)	109 (43)	99 (37)	89 (32)	94 (34)	109 (43)
Mean daily maximum °F (°C)	63.0 (17.2)	66.0 (18.9)	72.4 (22.4)	78.8 (26.0)	85.4 (29.7)	90.1 (32.3)	92.1 (33.4)	92.6 (33.7)	88.4 (31.3)	81.2 (27.3)	72.4 (22.4)	64.5 (18.1)	78.9 (26.1)
Mean daily minimum °F (°C)	45.1 (7.3)	48.5 (9.2)	54.3 (12.4)	60.9 (16.1)	68.7 (20.4)	73.9 (23.3)	75.5 (24.2)	75.7 (24.3)	71.7 (22.1)	63.1 (17.3)	53.9 (12.2)	46.7 (8.2)	61.5 (16.4)
Record low °F (°C)	10 (−12)	14 (−10)	22 (−6)	36 (2)	44 (7)	56 (13)	64 (18)	64 (18)	50 (10)	33 (1)	25 (−4)	9 (−13)	9 (−13)
Average precipitation inches (mm)	3.87 (98)	3.21 (82)	3.20 (81)	3.25 (83)	4.75 (121)	7.10 (180)	4.66 (118)	5.06 (129)	5.21 (132)	5.99 (152)	4.32 (110)	4.03 (102)	54.65 (1,388)
Average precipitation days (≥ 0.01 in)	9.2	9.0	8.0	7.1	7.3	9.9	9.1	9.8	9.1	7.6	8.5	9.1	103.7
Source: NOAA (sun 1961–1990)

See or edit raw graph data.

While Houston's yearly temperature cycles follow four distinct seasons, weather-wise, the city has a rainy season and a dry season. The wet season lasts from April/May to September/October; the dry season lasts from November/December to March/April. However, during El Niño or La Niña years, the wet and dry seasons can often either last longer than usual or be delayed.

=== Summer ===
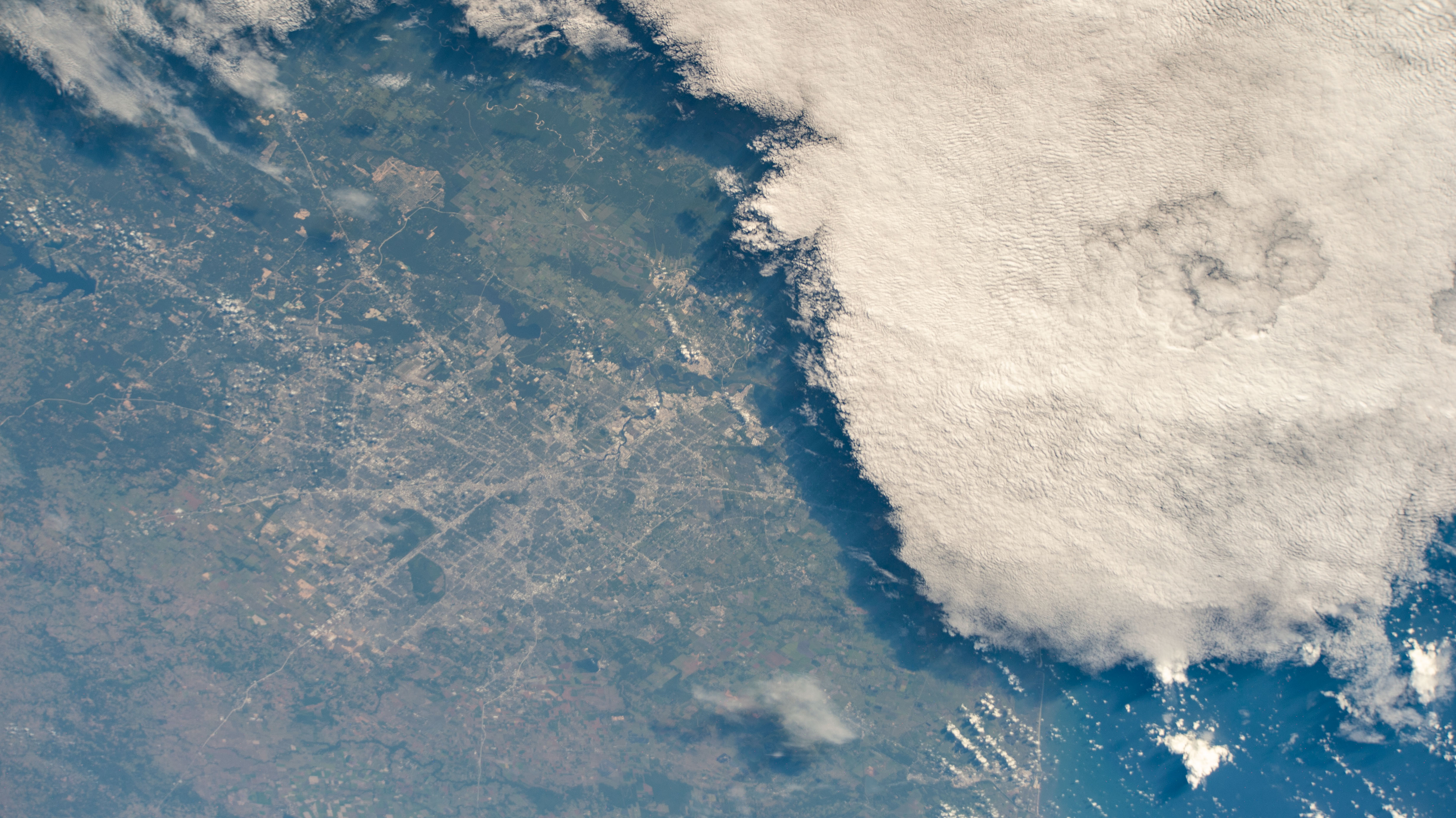
Houston on July 6, 2022, taken from the International Space Station

June through August are very hot and humid, often with scattered afternoon showers and thunderstorms. At George Bush Intercontinental Airport (IAH), the normal daily high temperature peaks at 95.0 °F (35.0 °C) on August 5–12, with a normal of 102.4 days per year at or above 90 °F (32 °C) and 3.5 days per year at or above 100 °F (38 °C). The average relative humidity ranges from over 90 percent in the morning to around 60 percent in the afternoon. Summer temperatures in Houston are very similar to average temperatures seen in tropical climates, such as in the Philippines and the lower elevations of Central America. The value of relative humidity results in a heat index higher than the actual temperature. The highest temperature ever recorded at George Bush Intercontinental Airport was 109 °F (43 °C) on four occasions: September 4, 2000; August 27, 2011; August 24, 2023; and August 27, 2023. On June 29, 2013, the temperature at George Bush Intercontinental Airport reached 107 °F (42 °C), the highest ever recorded in June. Heat stroke can strike people who stay outdoors for long periods of time during the summer, making hydration essential for outdoor work and recreational activity. The 2014 summer season did not yield 38 °C (100 °F)+ degree weather in response to the monsoon-sequel rainfall during late June to August, during a period where the Pacific Coast off Central America was heating up, which evolved into the 2014–16 El Niño event - this cycle was also observed between 1971 and 1976, during post-El Nino intervals.

Because of the high temperatures that persist from April through October, most indoor workers in Houston spend the hottest part of the day in an air-conditioned environment. After World War II, air conditioning stimulated the growth of Houston, and it was called the most air-conditioned city in the world in 1950.

=== Autumn ===
Autumn in Houston is warm, with temperatures averaging in the upper 60s to lower 80s °F (20-28 °C) during the day and in the 40s to lower 60s °F (10-17 °C) at night. Cool fronts that move through the region during the fall can bring rain. Hurricanes can move into the area from the Gulf of Mexico, bringing heavy rains and high winds. However, most years see little or no significant hurricane activity. Flooding most frequently occurs in October and November, which is the end of the Southeast Texas wet season. Most of these flood events result from remnants of Eastern Pacific cyclones interacting with upper-level boundaries; October 2015 was the latest example of such an occurrence, wherein the remnants of Hurricane Patricia brought over 9 inches of rain to the city. The latest hurricane to reach Texas was Hurricane Beryl in July 2024.

=== Winter ===
Winters in Houston are mild, dry, and temperate compared to most areas of the United States. Houston winters are, on average, slightly colder than South Florida and Southern California, on par with southern Louisiana and Central Florida, but much warmer than Dallas, Atlanta, San Antonio, Austin, and other inland southern cities. The average high in January, the coldest month, is 62.9 °F (17.2 °C) and the low is 43.2 °F (6.2 °C). George Bush Intercontinental Airport sees an average of 9.6 days per year of freezing temperatures. Cold fronts during the winter can bring nighttime lows that drop into the 30s but usually remain above freezing. The coldest weather of the season often involves temperatures in the low 30s to mid-40s at night. Hard freezes are not uncommon in North Houston; George Bush Intercontinental Airport has recorded at least one freeze every winter since it opened in 1969, except for 2023, when the lowest was 33 degrees. However, areas in the central and southern parts of the Houston metro area are consistently several degrees warmer on the coldest winter nights. Areas south of Interstate 10 can have entire winters without a freeze. The coldest temperature ever recorded at George Bush Intercontinental Airport was 7 °F (−14 °C) on December 23, 1989. Elsewhere, the temperature in Houston dropped to 5 °F (−15 °C) on January 18, 1930. The record low at Houston's Hobby Airport, closer to the city, is 9 °F (−13 °C).

In December, southward-moving cold fronts can bring cold rain, low wind chills, and, rarely, frozen precipitation. Early January is the coldest time of the year, with temperatures moderating slightly by February. Winter is also the driest part of the year for Houston.

=== Spring ===
Spring comes with a gradual warm-up from winter, lasting from February through May. Temperatures are generally not hot yet, averaging from 75–82 °F (23.9–27.8 °C) in the day and 56–64 °F (13.3–17.8 °C) at night. Spring thunderstorms are common, often with spectacular lightning shows. This rainfall prompts Houston's 10-month-long "growing season" to begin. March sees the return of many types of insects, including butterflies and mosquitoes, to Houston's warm climate.

== Precipitation ==
Rainfall is the most common form of precipitation in Houston and is plentiful throughout the year. The wettest month is June, with an average of 5.93 inches (151 mm) of rain. The city (and much of South and Southeast Texas) has its own irregular monsoon season, which usually lasts from May to October, but sometimes from April to September. Houston normally receives 49.77 inches (1,264 mm) of precipitation on 104.0 days annually. The most precipitation to fall in one year was 83.02 inches (2,108.7 mm), which occurred in 1979. Total rainfall in 2017, the year of Hurricane Harvey at IAH in northern Houston, was 2,024 millimetres (79.69 inches); rainfall in the month of the storm, August 2017, at IAH totalled 993 millimetres (39.11 inches).

Houston has received less than 20 inches (510 mm) of rain only once: 449 millimetres (17.66 inches) in 1917. In 2011, a drought resulted in a total of 624 millimetres (24.57 inches), with less than 25 millimetres (1 inch) recorded at IAH in six of the year's 12 months; only 2.3 millimetres (0.09 inches) was recorded that August and 2.8 millimetres (0.11 inches) that April.

Flash flood warnings are common all year, and due to the flat landscape, heavy rains often threaten life and property in the city. Sea breeze showers which are monsoon-like (especially during the summer months, originating from the mesoscale convective cycle, where the polar jet stream usually forms an omega block) are common throughout the Texas Gulf Coast area (from Brownsville to the Florida Peninsula), which has a similar climate to areas like Mumbai and Kolkata – locals refer to the sea breeze showers as the Gulf Coast Monsoon (also called the Gulf of Mexico or the Texas Monsoon), despite Houston being 15 meters (50 feet) above sea level. The sea breeze showers are also a contributor to the North American Monsoon.

Sleet and freezing rain are more common than snow in the Houston area. While accumulating snow events are rare in Houston, brief snow flurries occur every winter in the greater Houston area. These usually have no impact on travel as they are light, brief, and isolated. Hail can accumulate, but only in small quantities.

== Extreme weather ==
Houston has occasional severe weather, mostly flooding. Hurricanes that have the potential to landfall bring severe damage to the area. Seven major hurricanes have hit the Galveston and Houston areas in the past 100 years. Four have done significant damage to Houston.

=== Hurricanes and tropical storms ===
Because Houston is on the Gulf of Mexico, the city has a high chance of being hit by hurricanes or tropical storms every hurricane season (June through November).

In 1837, the Racer's Storm passed just to the south of the town, raising water levels four feet. The Great Hurricane of 1900 destroyed the nearby (and then much bigger) city of Galveston, which is situated on a barrier island 50 mi (80 km) southeast of downtown Houston. That hurricane weakened to a tropical storm by the time it reached Houston. The periphery of Hurricane Carla hit the city in 1961, causing major damage to Houston. At the time of landfall, Carla was the most powerful tropical system to hit the Texas coast in over 40 years. In 1983, the city was struck squarely by Hurricane Alicia, causing $1 billion of damage to the city during a down period in the city's economy.

Tropical Storm Allison dumped up to 37 inches (940 mm) of rain on parts of the city over a five-day period in 2001, and was the most destructive and costly natural disaster in Houston history prior to Hurricane Harvey. Area flooding was catastrophic and widespread. The storm completely overwhelmed the flood control system and caused 22 deaths in Houston and $6.05 billion (2006 USD) in damage. It was the only tropical storm in history to have its name retired until Tropical Storm Erika in Dominica in 2015.

Tropical Storm Erin made landfall in August 2007 with heavy rainfall. A total of 9 inches (230 mm) of rain fell elsewhere than George Bush Intercontinental Airport on August 16, and many roads and neighborhoods were flooded. Metropolitan Transit Authority of Harris County, Texas, halted its light rail and bus services in view of the effects. Four deaths in the city were attributed to the storm. The Houston Fire Department reported 72 rescue operations.

Hurricane Ike made landfall near Galveston, Texas in September 2008 as a Category 2 storm. Ike brought moderate rain but high winds for an unusually long duration (upwards of nine hours). The roof of Reliant Stadium (home of the Houston Texans NFL team) was damaged, and windows were blown out of several high-rise buildings in downtown Houston. Storm surge affected areas around Galveston Bay, stripping some coastal islands of homes. Authorities prohibited non-emergency access to the island for many weeks. Hurricane Ike left ninety percent of people in the Houston Area without power. Trucks from around the country brought in emergency supplies, especially water and ice. Most of the city was without power for 2–3 days, others for 2 to 3 weeks.

Hurricane Harvey made landfall in Rockport, Texas, very early on August 26, 2017. By August 30, Houston was flooded due to torrential rainfall from the hurricane.

Hurricane Beryl made landfall in Matagorda, Texas early on July 8, 2024, as a Category 1 storm. Beryl brought heavy rain and high winds to Houston. Beryl also killed a high number of people, with around 40 dead.

=== Flooding ===
Flooding is a recurring problem in Houston. This is because the city is on a floodplain and has a rainy season. It is especially severe in low-lying areas on the far east end of town along the San Jacinto River. The flat wetlands and paved-over coastal prairie around Houston drain slowly and easily flood. The area is drained by a network of bayous (small, slow-moving rivers, often dredged and enlarged to increase volume) and man-made drainage ditches, which are usually dry most of the year. In fall, cold fronts bring in rainstorms, and flooding is not uncommon. This might flood certain low-lying intersections, but it doesn't generally affect citizens or the business of the city. However, occasionally, very heavy thunderstorms dump so much water on the city that widespread congestion and even property damage in low-lying areas result. Tropical Storm Allison in 2001 was so severe that many parts of town that had never flooded before were flooded seriously. Interstate 10 near downtown, which is below grade, was covered by over 10 ft (3.0 m) of water. Another storm happened in June 2015 (Tropical Storm Bill) that had a similar impact on Houston, causing several highways to be closed due to the bayou overflowing; this event followed flooding from May 24–26. Another similar storm in April 2016 resulted in widespread, severe flooding across Houston and surrounding suburbs in an event later known as the "Tax Day Floods". In late August 2017, Hurricane Harvey flooded Houston, causing severe widespread damage and at least 14 deaths. On the night of May 18, 2021, a large and intense severe storm impacted Houston. It caused up to 101 millimeters (4 inches) of rain per hour in some areas.

=== Tornadoes ===
Unlike Dallas, Houston is not in Tornado Alley; however, smaller tornadoes can occur during severe weather. They are most likely to be found along frontal boundaries of an air mass during the spring months. Tornadoes in Houston usually measure a weak EF1 on the Enhanced Fujita scale and cause light to moderate damage to well-constructed buildings. The strongest recorded tornado in Houston history was an F4 on November 21, 1992, part of a large outbreak of tornadoes in Harris County.

=== Winter storms ===
There are usually a few days of freezing (≤ 32 °F (0 °C)) temperatures each year, though the average low in January, the coldest month, is still only 43 °F (6 °C) or 24 °F (−4 °C).

Snow falls infrequently in the Magnolia City. When it does occur, it usually melts immediately on the ground with light accumulation on roofs and raised surfaces. Only very uncommonly does it accumulate on the ground. Since 1895, it has snowed 39 times in Houston at an average of about once every 3 years, though some decades have several instances of recorded snowfall while others have only one each (e.g., the 1930s and 1950s) and one decade where there wasn't any snowfall (1990s). The last recorded snowfall in Houston was on January 21, 2025. There were more incidences of snow in the 1980s on average than any other decade recorded, but the 2000s also witnessed more frequent and record-breaking snows.

- February 14–February 15, 1895: 20 inches (51 cm) of snow, its largest snowfall from one storm on record.
- February 12, 1960: 4.4 inches (11 cm) of snow.
- January 11, 1973: 2.0 inches (5.1 cm) of snow.
- December 22, 1989: 1.7 inches (4.3 cm) of snow with a record low of 7 °F (−14 °C) on December 23.
- December 10, 2008: Tied the earliest accumulating snowfall record.
- December 4, 2009: Broke the earliest accumulating snowfall record.
- December 7, 2017: 0.7 inches (2 cm) of snow.
- November 13, 2018 Broke Earliest Snowfall Record
- February 15, 2021
- January 31 2023- trace
- February 1 2023- trace
- January 21, 2025

The 2004 Christmas Eve snowstorm brought a never-before-seen white Christmas to the region. Average annual snowfall is barely above zero, being less than the measurable amount of 0.1 inches (2.5 mm). In descending order of frequency, the most snow has fallen in January, followed by February, December, November, and finally a single occurrence on March 10, 1932, which was also the lowest recorded temperature for that month, 22 °F (−6 °C).

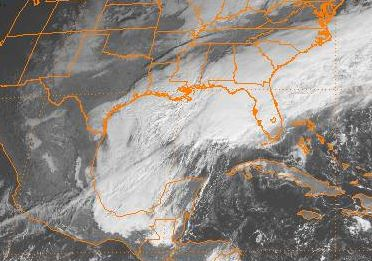
Satellite image of the December 24 snowstorm.

Occurrences of freezing rain, also known as ice storms, are more common than snow in Houston. Some of the most recent ice storms occurred in 1997, 2007, February 4, 2011, and January 16, 2018. An overnight event occurred from January 23, 2014 to January 24, another significant icing occurred a few days later on January 28, and a third event took place on March 4. These storms can be very disruptive since road crews are not equipped to handle such rare events over the city's expansive size. When ice occurs, roads and schools are usually closed. The city's Office of Emergency Management encourages driver's to "avoid driving unless absolutely necessary... if roadways are at risk of icing." Typically, such ice storms affect mainly the northern/western areas of the metro, while the southern/eastern areas are left with just cold rain. The ice storm that occurred on January 16, 2018, started as cold rain for several hours, before changing to a wintry mix and then eventually sleet and snow. Temperatures started in the low-mid 30s and quickly dropped to the 20s in the afternoon, before dipping into the teens by the evening/overnight hours, which caused all the rain to turn to ice, accumulating a thickness up to 1" on some roads, bridges, overpasses, making it one of the worst winter storms in the history of the state. The Winter Storm of February 15, 2021 was very dangerous and devastating for the Houston area, starting mainly as freezing rain with a few flakes or sleet pellets mixing in at times, then transitioning into moderate/heavy sleet during the evening and finally changing over to snow overnight bringing anywhere between 1-4" inches of snow throughout the Houston area on top of a layer of ice/sleet, there were widespread power outages throughout the majority of the state including Houston/Harris County.

== El Niño ==
During El Niño events, Houston winters are cooler and wetter than normal due to a stronger southern jet stream, which can increase the length of the normal wet season in Houston. Increased clouds during El-Niño winters are what keep the temperatures from warming up. During La Niña events, the jet stream shifts further north, resulting in a warmer and drier winter. The chance of damage from tropical storms and hurricanes also goes up during La Niña events, due to decreased Atlantic wind shear. Post-El Niño weather during the spring usually result in increased rainfall, as demonstrated during the Memorial Day 2015 and Tax Day/Memorial Day/early June 2016 flood events, where the Houston Metro area (and the rest of the state) experienced a climate similar to the South Asian summer monsoon (in this case, a stalled low-pressure system—usually from an upper-level low from the northeast Pacific Ocean, migrates east, where the northern polar jet stream form the usual omega blocks—originates over the Four Corners region or the Sierra Madre Occidental/Sierra Madre Oriental mountain ranges in northern Mexico).

== Environmental issues ==
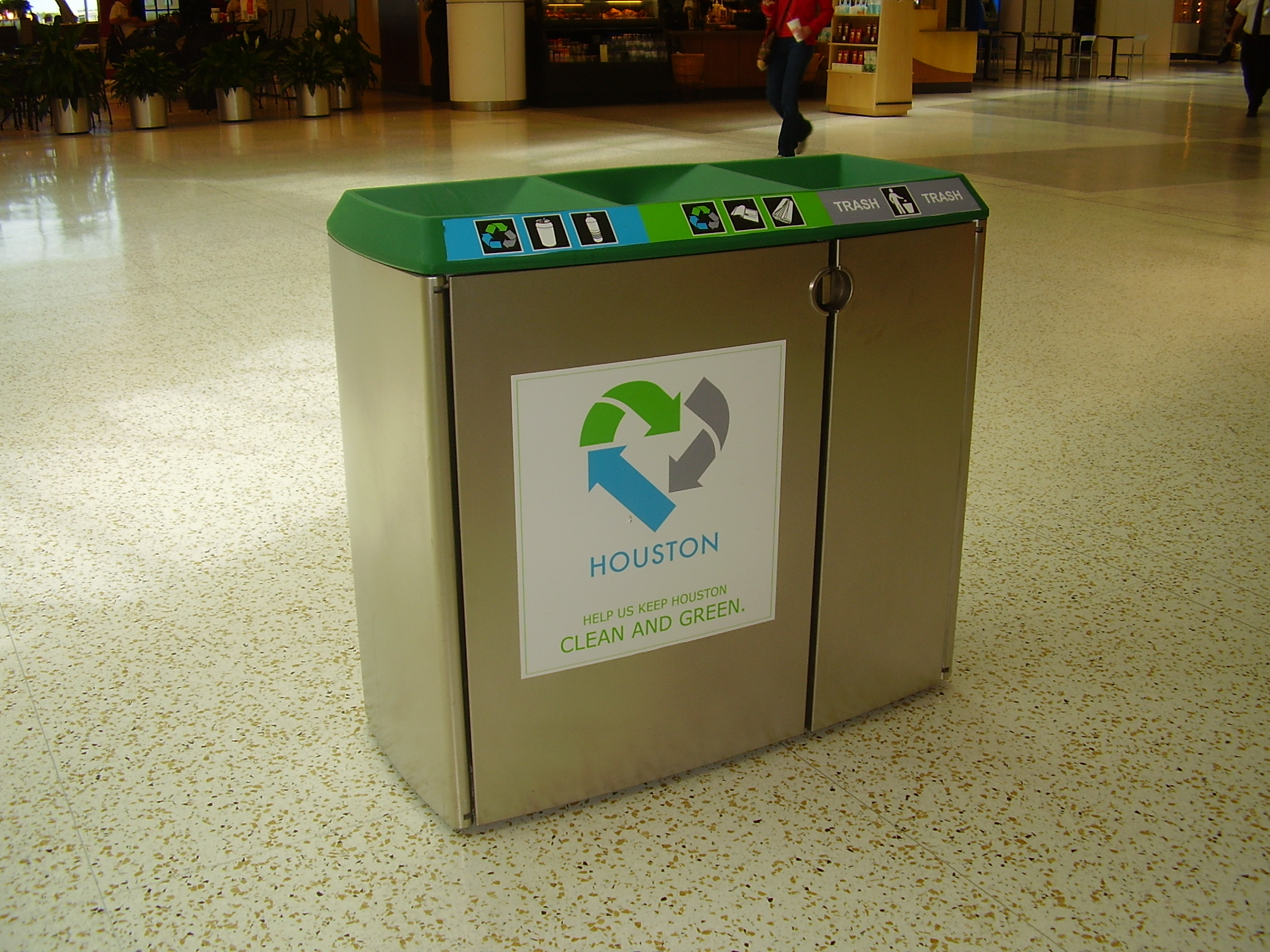
Trash and recycle bin at George Bush Intercontinental Airport

Houston has had a troubled past with pollution of many types. This is because Houston has been the home for the oil and gas industry since its inception in the early 1900s, when there was little environmental regulation. Harris County, where the bulk of the city has been historically located, is home to 15 Environmental Protection Agency Superfund sites, more than any other area in Texas. The list contains numerous companies, streets, and waterways that have been considered hazardous to humans in various ways.

Houston's environmental problems stem from a long history of pollution. Houston may be considered the air-conditioning capital of the world due to its hot and humid metropolitan. Since the 1930s, air-conditioning has been built into all commercial buildings like theaters, malls, and corporations. Even the Astrodome was air-conditioned, making baseball players and fans comfortable for decades. This led to the possibility of an energy crisis; because of the popularity of air-conditioning in Houston, energy costs are generally higher than normal.

=== Air pollution ===
Houston is well known for its oil and petrochemical industries, which are leading contributors to the city's economy. The industries located along the ship channel, coupled with a growing population, have caused a considerable increase in air pollution for the city each year. Houston has excessive ozone levels and is ranked among the most ozone-polluted cities in the United States. Ground-level ozone, or smog, is Houston's predominant air pollution problem. In 2011, Houston was ranked as the 17th most polluted city in the US, according to the American Lung Association. A 2007 assessment found the following twelve air pollutants to be definite risks to health in Houston:

- ozone - respiratory and cardiovascular effects
- particulates less than 2.5 μm in diameter (PM_{2.5}) - respiratory and cardiopulmonary effects
- diesel particulate matter (DPM) - cancer
- 1,3-butadiene - cancer and reproductive effects
- hexavalent chromium - cancer
- benzene - cancer
- ethylene dibromide - cancer
- acrylonitrile - cancer
- formaldehyde - cancer and respiratory effects
- acrolein - respiratory effects
- chlorine - respiratory effects
- hexamethylene diisocyanate - pulmonary and respiratory effects

The State of Texas concluded that, since 2000, the Manchester neighborhood in eastern Houston had the highest annual averages of 1,3-butadiene of any area in Texas. Houston's air quality has often been compared to Los Angeles and Beijing.

Houston has introduced many programs since the 2000 federal order to reduce air pollution in the city. The most notable project was the METRORail light rail system constructed in 2004. The light rail system was designed to encourage Houstonians to utilize public transportation instead of their automobiles.

Pollution rankings from the EPA and ALA are administered in terms of peak-based standards, focusing strictly on the worst days of the year; on average, ozone levels in Houston are lower than those seen in many other cities of the country, due to dominant winds off the Gulf that ensure clean, marine air.

=== Water pollution ===
Houston has also seen recent improvements to the city's waterways. The banks of Buffalo Bayou, Brays Bayou, and Sims Bayou have been cleaned of garbage and have been turned into jogging trails and parks. Since the mid-1990s, Houston has seen a great increase in wildlife along the bayou due to many successful cleaning attempts. The Port of Houston has not seen any major cleaning attempts.
