= Liftoff: Elon Musk and the Desperate Early Days That Launched SpaceX =

2021 book by Eric Berger

- Author: Eric Berger
- Language: English
- Subject: SpaceX; Elon Musk; Commercial spaceflight
- Genre: Non-fiction
- Publisher: William Morrow
- Publication date: March 2, 2021
- Publication place: United States
- Media type: Print
- Pages: 288
- ISBN: 978-0-06-297997-1

Liftoff: Elon Musk and the Desperate Early Days That Launched SpaceX is a 2021 book by science journalist Eric Berger about the early years of SpaceX and the role of Elon Musk in the company's formation and survival. Published by William Morrow on March 2, 2021, the book focuses on the first four launches of the Falcon 1 rocket and the near-collapse of SpaceX before its first successful orbital mission in 2008.

The book draws on interviews with current and former SpaceX engineers, designers, mechanics and executives, including Musk, and follows the company from its beginnings in El Segundo through engine testing in Texas and launches at Kwajalein Atoll.

== Synopsis ==
The book recounts SpaceX's founding as a startup with fewer than 200 employees and about $100 million in funding, at a time when other private rocket ventures had failed and the company still had to compete with major aerospace contractors such as Lockheed Martin and Boeing. The narrative centers on the first four Falcon 1 launch attempts, the first three of which failed for different technical reasons before the fourth succeeded in September 2008.

Berger places particular emphasis on SpaceX's "iterative design" philosophy, in which rapid prototyping and repeated failure were treated as part of the engineering process rather than as reasons to halt development.

== Reception ==
Kirkus Reviews called the book "irresistible" for readers interested in entrepreneurship and space, and described it as an up-close account of Musk's trajectory and SpaceX's early ambitions. Publishers Weekly described it as an "exuberant debut" and a "rousing—and hopeful—saga" of technological development under severe financial and engineering pressure.

Jim Motavalli in the New York Journal of Books praised Berger's decision to focus on SpaceX's early years and said he effectively captured Musk's brinkmanship, while John Thornhill in the Financial Times wrote that Berger told the "white-knuckle story" of SpaceX's creation and near-collapse effectively, even though Musk remained at the center of the narrative.
