= 2018–19 North American winter =

- Temperatures plummeting across North America in late January 2019

Seasonal boundaries
- Meteorological winter: December 1 – February 28
- Astronomical winter: December 21 – March 20
- First event started: November 13, 2018
- Last event concluded: April 14, 2019

Most notable event
- Name: March 2019 North American blizzard
  - Duration: March 8–16, 2019
  - Lowest pressure: 968 mb (28.59 inHg)
  - Fatalities: 1 fatality
  - Damage: ≥ $14.91 million (2019 USD)

Seasonal statistics
- Total WPC-issued storms: 19 total
- Rated storms (RSI) (Cat. 1+): 10 total
- Major storms (RSI) (Cat. 3+): 2 total
- Maximum snowfall accumulation: 52 in (130 cm) at Wolf Creek Pass, Colorado (March 8–16, 2019)
- Maximum ice accretion: 0.5 in (13 mm) near Toledo, Ohio) (February 11–13, 2019)
- Total fatalities: 52 total
- Total damage: ≥ $264.91 million (2019 USD)

Related articles
- 2018–19 European windstorm season

The 2018–19 North American winter was unusually cold within the Northern United States, with frigid temperatures being recorded within the middle of the season. Several notable events occurred, such as rare snow in the Southeast in December, a strong cold wave and several major winter storms in the Midwest, and upper Northeast and much of Canada in late January and early February, record snowstorms in the Southwest in late February, deadly tornado outbreaks in the Southeast and a historic mid-April blizzard in the Midwest, but the most notable event of the winter was a record-breaking bomb cyclone that affected much of the Central United States and Canada in mid-March. Unlike previous winters, a developing weak El Niño was expected to influence weather patterns across North America. Overall, however, winter of 2018–19 had many La Niña like conditions, being mild along the mid- and lower parts of the East Coast, the West Coast, and most of the southern Plains. Overall, the meteorological winter of 2018-19 became the wettest on record for the United States.

While there is no well-agreed-upon date used to indicate the start of winter in the Northern Hemisphere, there are two definitions of winter which may be used. Based on the astronomical definition, winter begins at the winter solstice, which in 2018 occurred on December 21, and ends at the March equinox, which in 2019 occurred on March 20. Based on the meteorological definition, the first day of winter is December 1 and the last day February 28. Both definitions involve a period of approximately three months, with some variability. Winter is often defined by meteorologists to be the three calendar months with the lowest average temperatures. Since both definitions span the calendar year, it is possible to have a winter storm in two different years.

== Seasonal forecasts ==
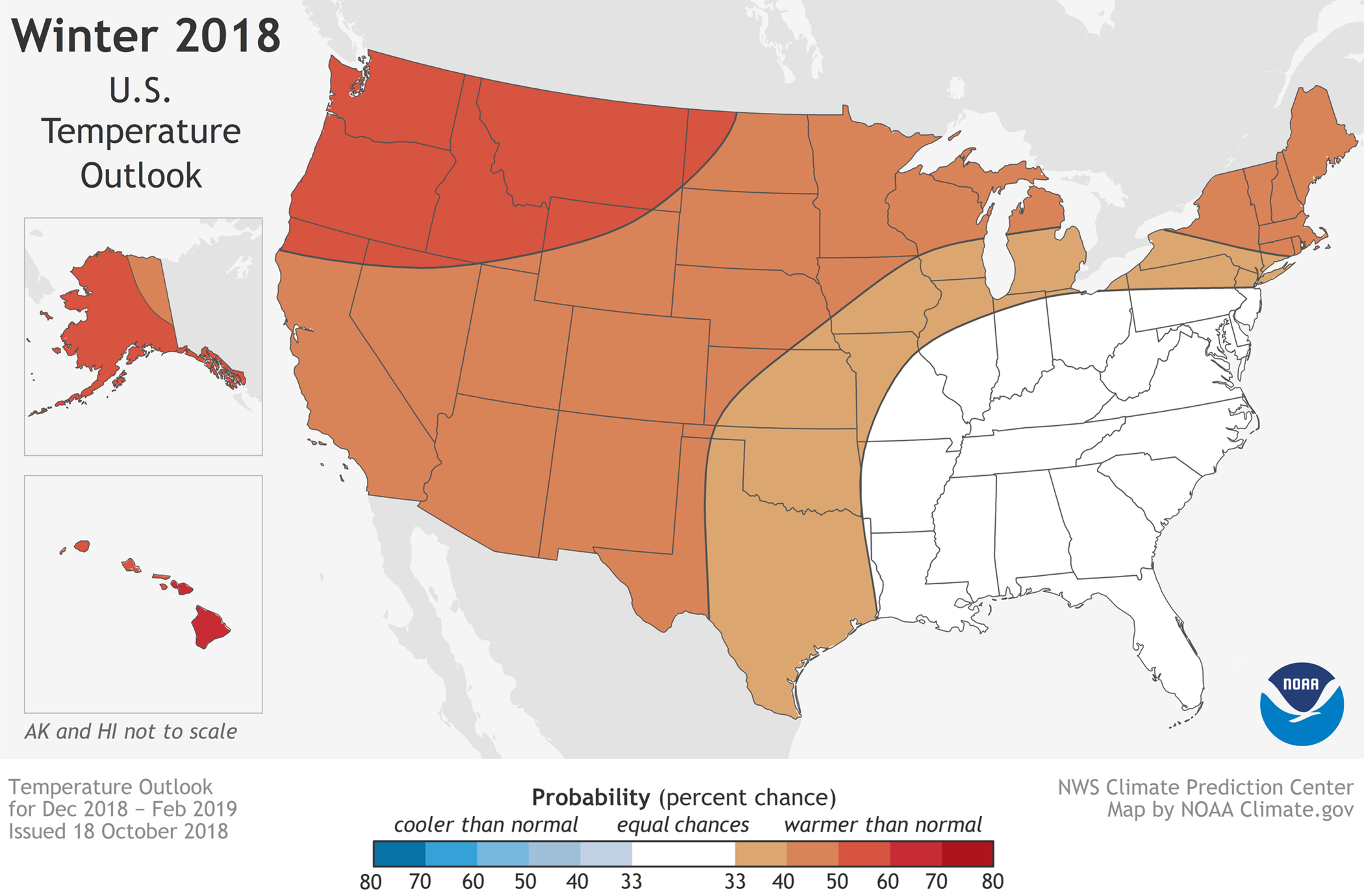
Temperature outlook

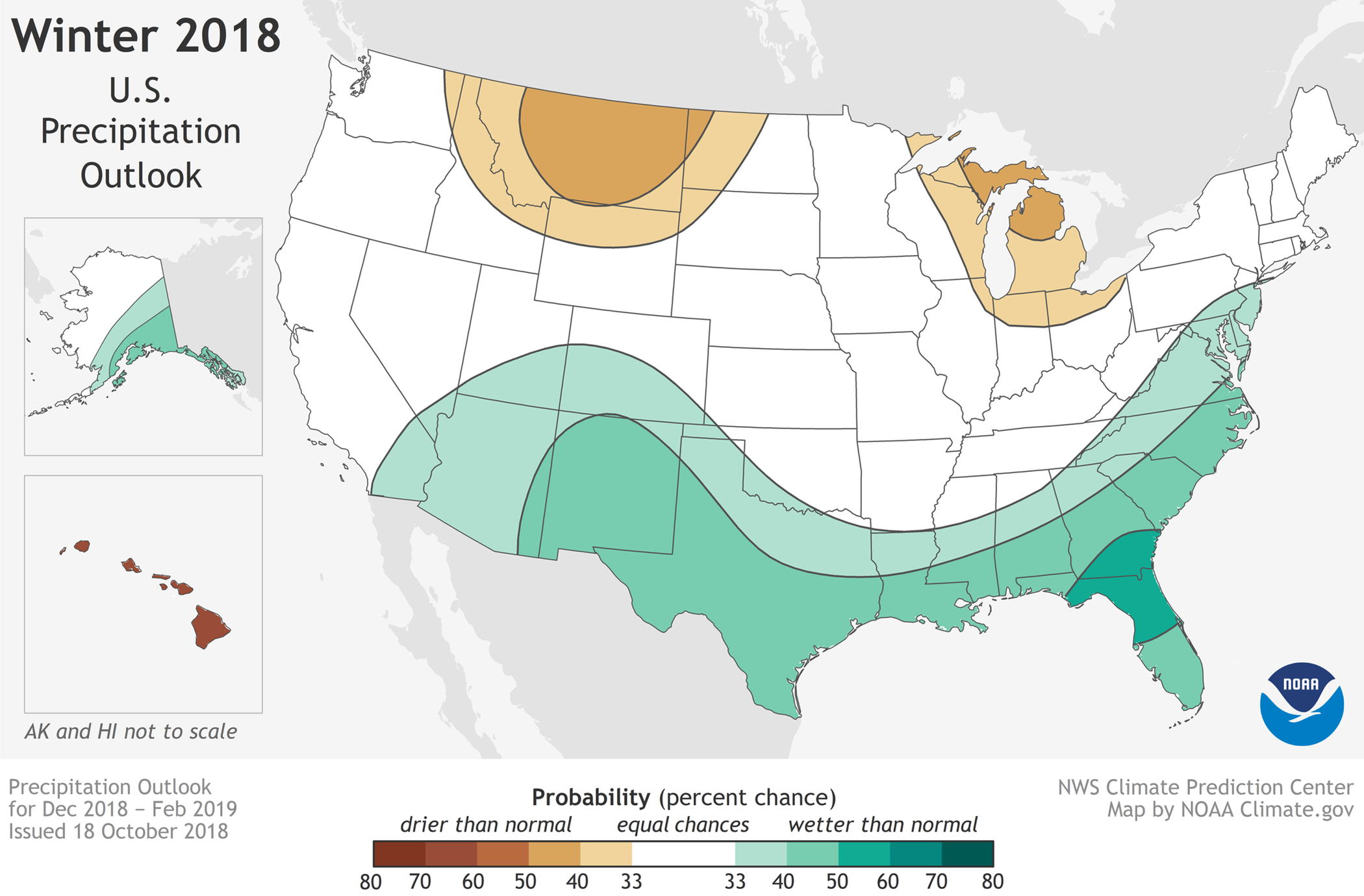
Precipitation outlook

On October 18, 2018, the National Oceanic and Atmospheric Administration's Climate Prediction Center released its U.S. Winter Outlook. The outlook noted a 70 to 75% chance of El Niño developing. CPC Deputy Director Mike Halpert specified that development was expected to occur by late fall to early winter. He added that while the El Niño was expected to be weak, it still had the potential to bring drier conditions to the northern United States and wetter conditions to the southern U.S. The outlook also noted the potential for the Arctic oscillation to bring colder-than-average conditions to the eastern U.S. and the possibility of the Madden–Julian oscillation contributing to heavy-precipitation events along the West Coast. The temperature outlook favored warmer-than-normal conditions across the northern and western U.S. with the highest probabilities from the Pacific Northwest to the northern Plains and in Alaska. Such conditions were also favored in Hawaii. The outlook also noted that the Tennessee and Ohio Valleys, the Mid-Atlantic region, and the U.S. Southeast had equal chances of either above-, below-, or near-average temperatures. The outlook did not delineate any areas likely to experience below-average conditions. The precipitation outlook noted an elevated probability of wetter-than-average conditions across the southern tier of the United States and along the eastern U.S. up to the Mid-Atlantic. Drier conditions were favored in parts of the northern Rockies and northern Plains, northern Ohio Valley, and Great Lakes regions. The drought outlook mentioned a high likelihood for drought conditions to persist across parts of the southwestern U.S., southern California, the central Great Basin, the central Rockies, the northern Plains, and parts of the interior Pacific Northwest. Drought conditions were favored to improve in the central Plains, the coastal Pacific Northwest, southern portions of Colorado and Utah, and in various areas in both Arizona and New Mexico.

== Seasonal summary ==
The 2018–19 winter season opened in mid-November, with a winter storm across the United States causing 11 deaths, one of the worst traffic jams in New York City, and 555 car crashes in New Jersey. A few weeks later, another blizzard killed 4 more people. After that, another winter storm caused 3 more deaths in North Carolina. From January 16 to 19, a winter storm crosses the United States, killing ten. Then, from January 24 into February, a cold wave brought record low temperatures to the United States. Illinois set a statewide record low temperature. Twenty-two people die as a result of the cold. Then, in mid-March, another cross country storm came to the United States, which killed a man in Colorado, left 140,000 without power in Texas, and contributed to the 2019 Midwestern U.S. floods, which caused two deaths in Nebraska and one in Iowa. Another blizzard struck the United States in April 2019. In October 2019, record cold and near-record cold come down over the Pacific Northwest and Northern Plains. In particular, with a mean statewide temperature of 36.7 °F (2.6 °C), Idaho realized its coldest October on record.

== Events ==
=== Mid-November winter storm ===
- Category 1 "Notable" (RSI/NOAA: 2.016)
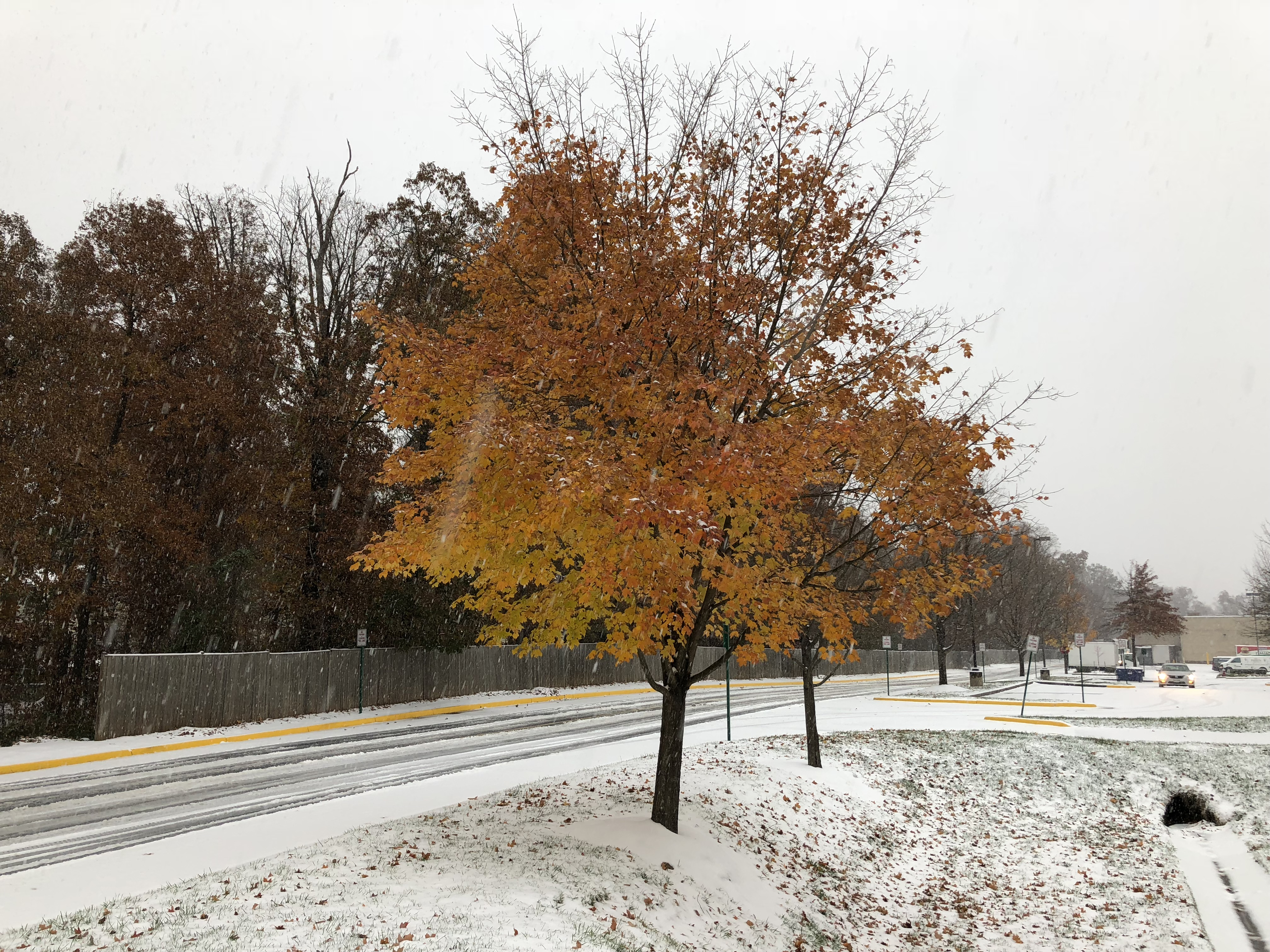
- Duration: November 13 – November 15, 2018
- Maximum snow: 18.3 in (46 cm)
- Fatalities: 11 fatalities
- Damage: $250 million (2018 USD)

An early season winter storm developed in a deep dive of the jet stream into the mid-south on November 13. In Monroe, Louisiana 0.4 inches (1.0 cm) of snow accumulated on the morning of November 14, breaking the record for the earliest snowfall by 10 days. In Mississippi light snow was reported in Greenville, sleet in Tupelo and Memphis, Tennessee picked up 0.6 inches (1.5 cm) of snow. Meanwhile, in Ohio, ice accumulations of one-quarter to one-third of an inch were reported in Cincinnati and Dayton metros as well as parts of Northern and Central Kentucky. A general 2 to 5 inches (5 to 13 centimetres) of snow fell in the St. Louis metro with isolated reports of 9 inches (23 cm). On November 15, as the storm headed northeastward, an unexpected 6.4 inches (~16.2 cm) of snow fell in Central Park, which became their earliest six inch snowfall on record, as well as their second largest November winter storm on record, which caught many off guard and resulting in several hour-long commutes that night. This was considered by some as one of New York City's worst commutes, as some were over ten hours, and New Jersey reported 555 car crashes. Further north, the Toronto area received 10–15 cm (4–6 in) of snow, leading to significant delays. In New Jersey, a person died due to the storm in a traffic related incident. Two others died, and 44 were injured, when a bus was overturned in Mississippi. Eight others died, including three in Arkansas, two in Michigan, and one each in Maryland, Ohio and Indiana. In addition, around 190,000 customers lost power as the storm moved through, with 1,615 flights being cancelled as well. The melted snow from this storm made 2018 the wettest year on record in Baltimore. The colder air that helped make the snow more intense then originally forecasted also led to daily record lows in Massena, New York, Montpelier, Vermont, Caribou, Maine and Bangor, Maine.

=== Late November blizzard ===
- Category 1 "Notable" (RSI/NOAA: 1.333)
- Duration: November 23 – November 27, 2018
- Maximum snow: 8.4 in (21 cm)
- Fatalities: 4 fatalities

A winter storm formed over the Pacific Northwest on November 23 and tracked into the interior Northeast by November 27. Snow caused a 20 vehicle pile-up in Colorado on Interstate 70, and Interstate 80 in Southeastern Wyoming had to be shut down due to heavy snow and strong winds. The storm snarled traffic in Kansas, Nebraska, Iowa, Missouri and parts of Illinois as blizzard conditions were reported in Salina, Kansas towards Independence, Missouri and northwards into Iowa and Illinois. Conditions were so bad that stranded drivers had to be rescued by snowmobile. Nationwide, nearly 3,000 flights were cancelled and 4 have died. 5.8 inches (15 cm) of snow fell in Kansas City and 8.4 inches (21 cm) were reported at O'Hare. In the Quad Cities and Rockford, Illinois, this snowstorm, plus one earlier in the month, made this the snowiest November on record. Additionally, as the storm pushed into Upstate New York and Northern New England, over a foot of snow were recorded in some locations.

=== Early December snowstorm ===
- Category 3 "Major" (RSI/NOAA: 6.992)
- Duration: December 8 – December 9, 2018
- Maximum snow: 34 in (86 cm)
- Fatalities: 3 fatalities

A significant winter storm brought snow and ice from Southern plains to the Southeast. Early on December 8, 10.5 inches (27 centimetres) of snow fell in Lubbock, Texas. Snow fell as south and east as Abilene, Texas. This storm caused thousands of people to lose power and 60 car crashes were reported across the Lubbock area. This was the third time Lubbock has had a double digit snowfall. Only 4 inches were predicted across Lubbock; the residents were shocked to wake up to almost a foot of snow. The storm moved east from Texas and Oklahoma to the Carolinas and Virginia. The storm caused icing across Tennessee and Arkansas as well as some snowfall. Late on December 9, 1 foot (30 centimetres) of snow or more had fallen in parts of North Carolina and Virginia; both states had declared states of emergency. 240,000 Duke Energy customers had lost power in North Carolina, along with 170,000 more in South Carolina. Appalachian Power had 20,000 without power in Virginia. Alabama, Georgia and Tennessee also had power outages. Charlotte Douglas International Airport had over 1,000 cancellations. Near Winston-Salem, over 16 inches of snow fell, and part of Greensboro, North Carolina received nearly a foot. Three people died in North Carolina. Busick, North Carolina received 34 inches of snow.

=== Mid-January winter storm ===
- Category 1 "Notable" (RSI/NOAA: 2.83)
- Duration: January 16 – January 21, 2019
- Maximum snow: 52 in (130 cm)
- Fatalities: 10 fatalities

A state of emergency was declared in Pennsylvania and New Jersey as a large winter storm made its way to the Northeastern United States. Three people had already been killed in the Midwest. By January 21, over 4,800 flights had been cancelled and 3,000 delayed. Interstate 55 in Missouri was blocked when snow caused 15 vehicles to crash. Snow totals in New York included 10-15 inches in the Albany area, 18-20 inches in the Adirondacks, and a foot of snow in Buffalo. Connecticut had nearly 28,000 lose power, as well as 3,000 in Ohio. In Southern Ontario, parts of Hamilton received over 40 cm (15.5 in) due to lake-effect snow coming off of Lake Ontario. The Toronto area received around 10 cm (4 in), with 20 cm (8 in) in Montreal.

=== Late January–early February cold wave ===
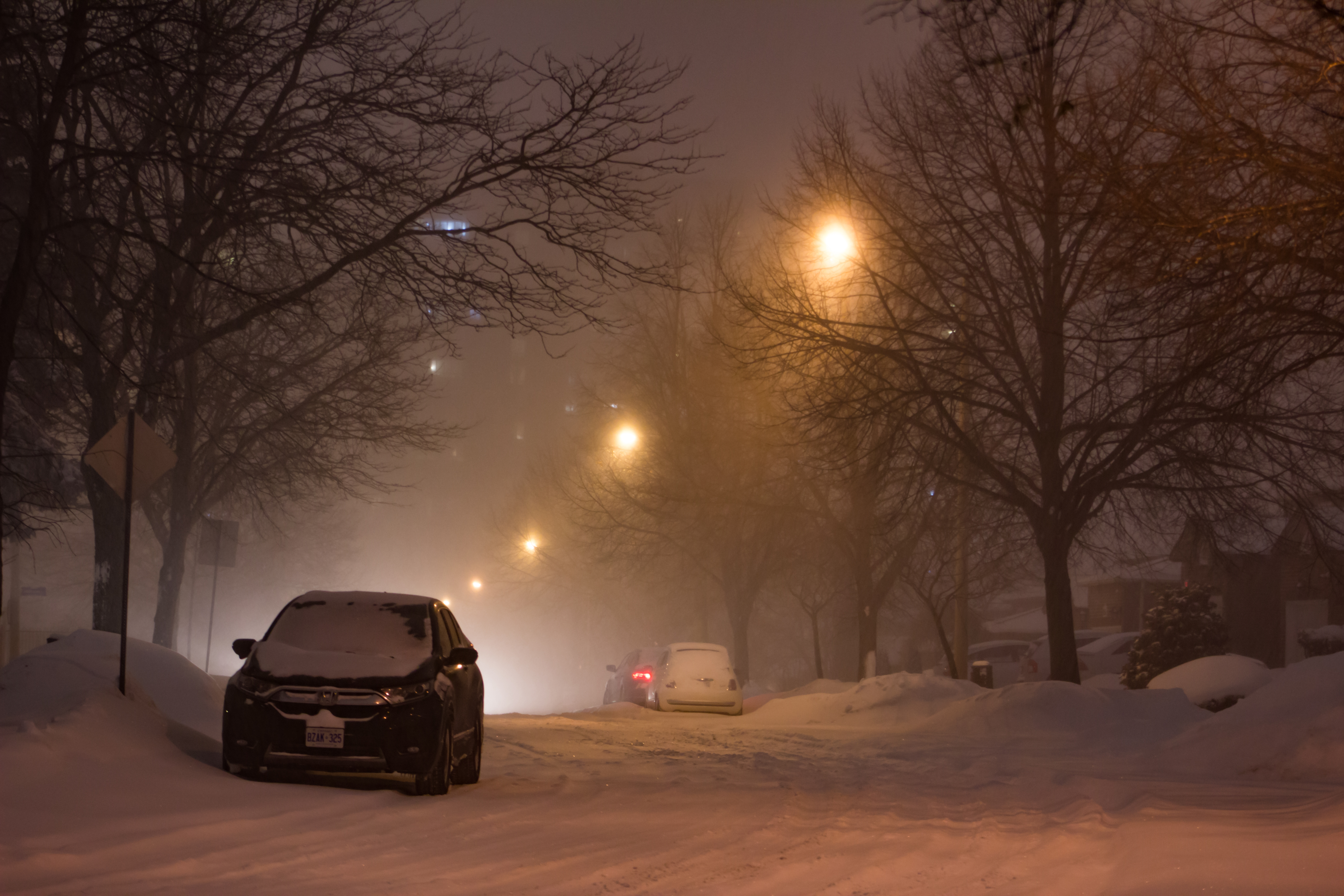
The storm as seen in Toronto

Radar loop of the Late January storm hitting Michigan

A storm, resulting from a polar vortex from the north, brought blizzard conditions and between 6 and 14 inches (15 and 36 centimetres) of snow to the Upper Midwest and Great Lakes region starting in the late evening hours of January 27, while a separate storm dropped snow over the Southeast. Accumulations reached 5 inches (13 cm) in Chicago and Minneapolis, 7 inches (18 cm) in Milwaukee, and 13 inches (33 cm) in Toronto (with 4 inches (10 cm) on the day before with a separate system).

Record-breaking and extreme cold immediately followed the storm as the polar vortex shifted south. Midwestern cities, including Minneapolis, Detroit, Chicago and Milwaukee are under wind chill advisories and severe wind chill warnings with wind chills approaching −55 °F (−48 °C) at night. Chicago area schools, universities, public transportation, and cultural attractions announced closures or reduced schedules during the weather emergency. Michigan Governor Gretchen Whitmer and Wisconsin Governor Tony Evers declared states of emergency due to the record low windchill temperatures. At least 22 people had reportedly died due to the cold wave as of January 31, 2019.

=== Mid-February storm complex ===
- Category 0 "Nuisance" (RSI/NOAA: N/A)
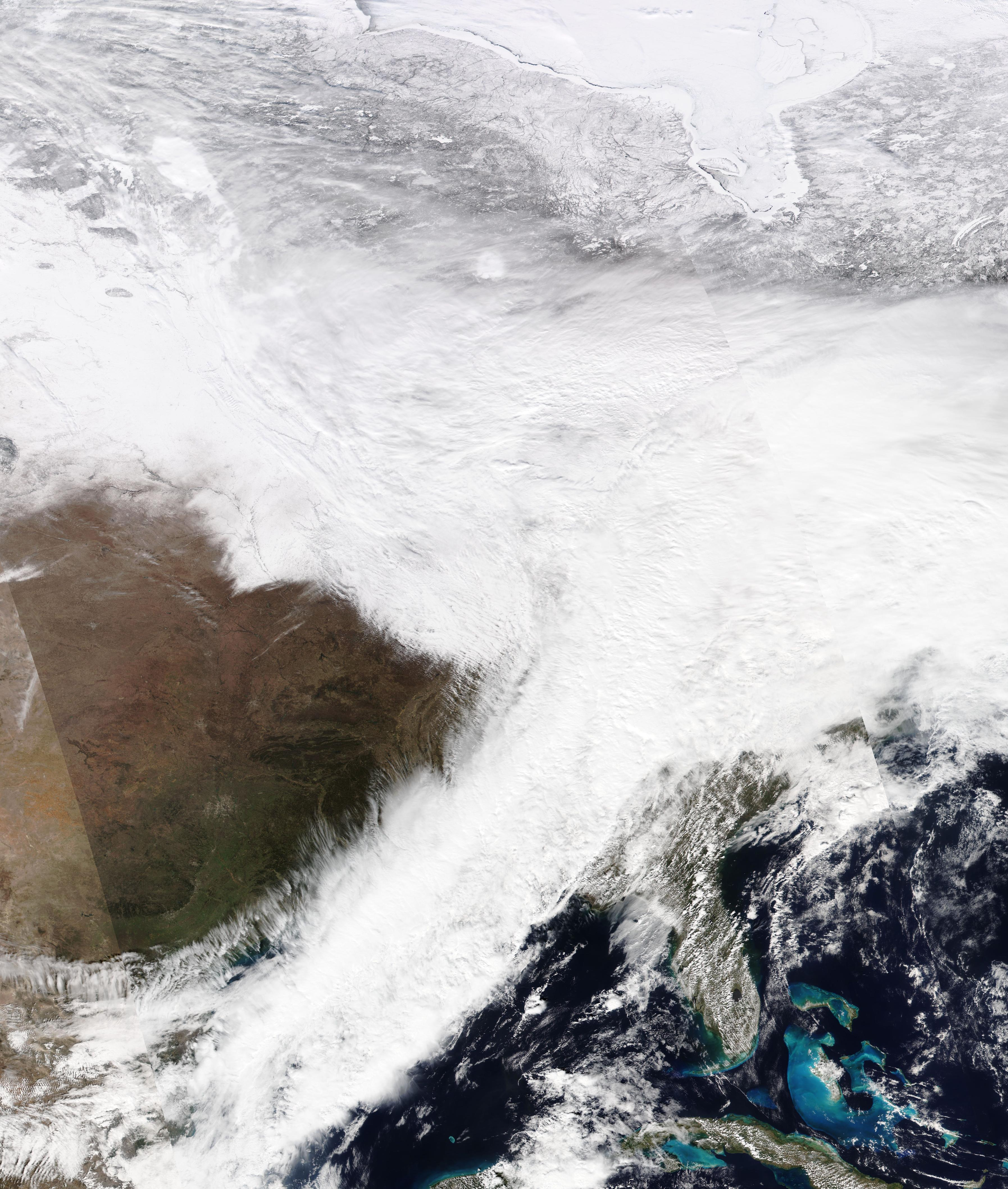
- Duration: February 11 – February 13, 2019
- Maximum snow: 26.5 in (67 cm)
- Fatalities: 1 fatalities

Another storm began on February 11, with some areas in the Midwestern and Northeastern United States expected to receive up to 12 inches (30 cm) of snow in the upcoming days, as well as parts of Ontario and Quebec expected to receive 14 inches (36 cm). In Toronto, all schools were closed on February 12 in anticipation of the storm. The city saw up to 15 cm (6 in) of snow followed by sleet and freezing rain. Ice and snow in Chicago resulted in 70,000 ComEd power outages. The storm's maximum snowfall accumulation was 26.5 inches (67 cm), which fell near Negaunee, Michigan. Ice secretion peaked at half an inch north of Toledo, Ohio.

=== Early March nor'easter ===
- Category 1 "Notable" (RSI/NOAA: 1.374)
- Duration: March 2 – March 4, 2019
- Maximum snow: 16 in (41 cm)

The second storm had formed over the Rockies by March 2 and winter storm warnings were already in place there. In Colorado, 16 inches (41 cm) of snow fell at Estes Park and 3.7 inches (9.4 cm) fell at Denver International Airport. 13 inches (33 cm) of snow fell in Squaw Valley, California. As the storm tracked eastward, snow was wreaking havoc on parts of the Four Corner States and the Midwest, closing roads and cancelling over 700 flights. Shaping up to be much more intense than the first storm for the US Northeast, The National Weather Service issued winter storm warnings from West Virginia to Maine. Closer to the Atlantic coast a mix of rain and snow affected major cities such as Baltimore, Philadelphia, New York City and Boston and further south, precipitation was rain, with severe thunderstorms along the cold front in the Deep South, resulting in a deadly early-season tornado outbreak in Dixie Alley. The storm also affected Atlantic Canada, although the track of the low was much closer to the shoreline than the previous storm, resulting in mixed precipitation for Nova Scotia and Prince Edward Island, with heftier snowfall totals in New Brunswick and Newfoundland. 24 centimetres (9.4 in) of snow fell in Moncton and winds gusted to 170 kilometres per hour (110 mph) in Wreckhouse.

=== Mid-March blizzard ===
- Category 1 "Notable" (RSI/NOAA: 1.84)
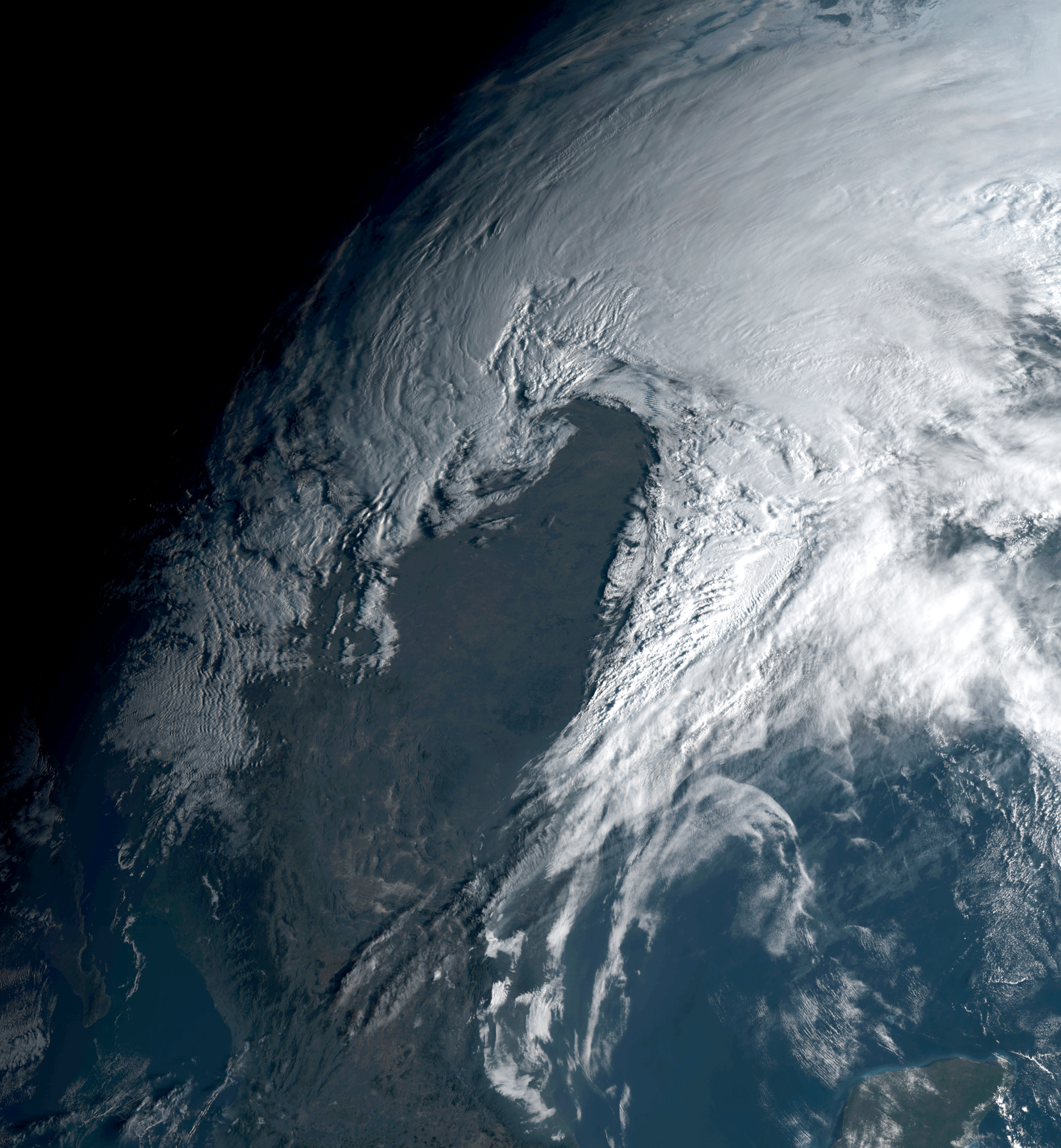
- Duration: March 8 – March 16, 2019
- Lowest pressure: 968 mb (28.59 inHg)
- Maximum snow: 52 in (130 cm)
- Fatalities: 1 fatalities
- Damage: ≥ $14.91 million (2019 USD)

A Colorado low formed in the southwest and began tracking northeastward, undergoing explosive intensification in the process, bottoming out near 968 millibars over Kansas, meeting the criteria for a bomb cyclone and smashing all-time low pressure records at several towns in New Mexico, Colorado, Kansas and Texas. The pressure of 970.4 millibars in Lamar led to a new statewide low pressure record for Colorado. On March 13 the tight pressure gradient produced widespread wind gusts above 60 mph (97 km/h)+), with a peak gust of 109 miles per hour (175 km/h) at Grand Prairie, strong enough to flip airplanes at the municipal airport there. Along the cold front, a line of severe thunderstorms developed, mainly in Texas, dropping several tornadoes, 2 in New Mexico and 1 in Texas, damaging many homes. A combination of severe weather and strong winds cut power to 140,000 in Texas, mostly near Dallas. The storms also produced baseball-sized hail in many parts of the Southwest. As the storm tracked further north, in Ontario, because of the thick snowpack, forecasters were concerned about flooding. Meanwhile, the storm brought extreme blizzard conditions to the plains, poor visibility closing many interstates from North Dakota to Colorado and just to the south, severe flooding caused billions of dollars in damage. A few notable snowfall totals from this storm include the more than 50 inches (130 cm)+) that fell at Wolf Creek pass in Colorado, 26 inches (66 cm) that fell just south of Casper and 18 inches (46 cm) of snow, falling in Kadoka.

=== Mid-April blizzard ===
- Category 3 "Major" (RSI/NOAA: 8.507)
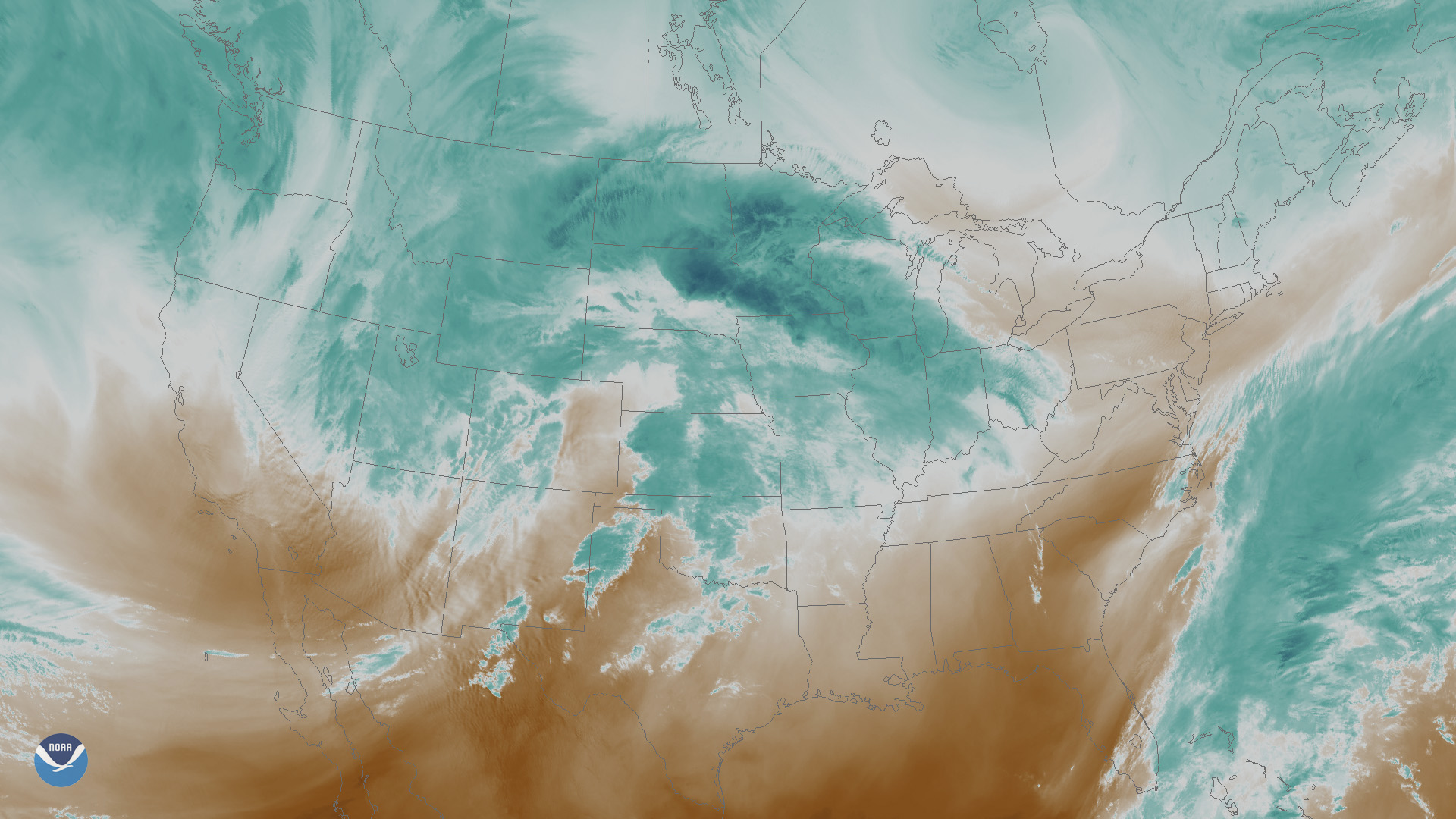
- Duration: April 10 – April 14, 2019
- Lowest pressure: 982 mb (29.00 inHg)
- Maximum snow: 30 in (76 cm)

A historic mid-April winter storm produced several feet of snow across the Northern Plains and Midwest, with snowfall rates exceeding 2 inches per hour at times, combined with powerful winds resulted in widespread blizzard conditions. In the previous year, Minneapolis and St Paul had their largest April winter storm on record, although that record may have been challenged.

== Records ==
=== United States ===
Numerous records were broken in the United States during the 2018-19 winter.

Autumn was unusually snowy across North America. On October 14, Kansas City recorded their earliest snowfall on record. North American snow cover in November 2018 also set a record. Lehigh Valley, Pennsylvania recorded their biggest November snowstorm on record on November 15, 2018. That storm also resulted in Monroe, Louisiana seeing their earliest first measurable snowfall the day earlier. 2018 also became the snowiest November on record in Vermont, as well as John F. Kennedy International Airport in New York City. 2018 also saw the coldest ever November temperatures in Mount Washington (−26 °F (−32 °C)), Syracuse, New York (−1 °F (−18 °C)), Ithaca, New York (−5 °F (−21 °C)) LaGuardia Airport (17 °F (−8 °C)), JFK Airport(15 °F (−9 °C)), and Bridgeport, Connecticut (13 °F (−11 °C)). The high of 16 °F (−9 °C) in Worcester and 21 °F (−6 °C) in Hartford also broke records for coldest November high temperatures. This became the coldest November on record in Kansas City.

Several all-time record low temperatures were set during a historic cold wave at the end of January. On January 30, temperatures at the Quad Cities International Airport bottomed out at −33 °F (−36 °C), which set an all-time record low. Other cities that set all-time record lows include Mather, Wisconsin, Rockford, Illinois and Cedar Rapids, Iowa. Temperatures of −56 °F (−49 °C) in Cotton, Minnesota set statewide records for daily record low on January 27 and 31st. The entire state of Illinois set a record low on January 31, when Mount Carroll dropped to −38 °F (−39 °C).

In the month of February, several cities recorded their all time snowiest February, including Eau Claire, Wisconsin at 53.7 in (136 cm), Pendleton, Oregon at 32.5 in (83 cm), Seattle at 20.2 in (51 cm) and Rochester, Minnesota at 40 in (100 cm). The 27 in (69 cm) of snow in Omaha propelled the winter of 2018–19 to be the snowiest on record there. However, several rainfall records were also broken further south, including Nashville at 13.47 in (342 mm) of rain, Huntsville at 13.72 in (348 mm) of rain, and Tupelo at 15.61 in (396 mm). February also became the coldest February on record in Miles City, Montana and Rapid City, South Dakota. In Aberdeen, South Dakota, the highest temperature all month was only 22 °F (−6 °C). For the first time in history, Los Angeles failed to reach 70 °F (21 °C) in February. On February 21, Flagstaff saw their snowiest day on record with 35.9 in (91 cm) of snow. From February 28 to March 4, New York City tied a record for the most consecutive days with measurable snow, at 5. The snowiest March on record was realized at Copper Mountain.

=== Canada ===
The city of Edmonton recorded their snowiest September on record, with 22 cm (8.7 in) of snow falling. In the city of Calgary, the snowiest October was reached as early as October 10. 2018 saw the most expansive September snow in Canada, as well as North America as a whole.

== Season effects ==
This is a table of all of the events that have occurred in the 2019–20 North American winter. It includes their duration, damage, impacted locations, and death totals. Deaths in parentheses are additional and indirect (an example of an indirect death would be a traffic accident), but were still related to that storm. All of the damage figures are in 2019 USD.

Regional snowfall index scale
C0	C1	C2	C3	C4	C5

2018–19 North American winter season statistics
Event name	Dates active	RSI category	RSI value	Highest gust mph (km/h)	Minimum pressure (mbar)	Maximum snow in (cm)	Maximum ice in (mm)	Areas affected	Damage (2019 USD)	Deaths
Mid-November winter storm	November 13–15	Category 1	2.016	67 (108)	Unknown	18.3 (46)	Unknown	Southern United States Midwestern United States Northeastern United States	$250 million	11
Late November blizzard	November 23–27	Category 1	1.333	Unknown	Unknown	8.4 (21)	Unknown	Western United States Midwestern United States Northeastern United States	Unknown	4
Early December snowstorm	December 8–9	Category 3	6.992	Unknown	Unknown	34 (86.3)	Unknown	Southern United States	Unknown	3
Mid-January winter storm	January 16–21	Category 1	2.83	164 (264)	Unknown	52 (130)	Unknown	Western United States Midwestern United States Northeastern United States Eastern Canada	Unknown	10
Mid-February storm complex	February 11–13	N/A	N/A	Unknown	Unknown	26.5 (67)	0.5 (1.3)	Midwestern United States Northeastern United States Eastern Canada	Unknown	1
Early March nor'easter	March 2–4	Category 1	1.374	110 (170)	Unknown	16 (41)	Unknown	Western United States Midwestern United States Southern United States Northeastern United States Eastern Canada	Unknown	0
Mid-March blizzard	March 8–16	Category 1	1.84	109 (175)	968	52 (130)	Unknown	Western United States Southern United States Midwestern United States Eastern Canada	≥$14.91 million	1
Mid-April blizzard	April 10–14	Category 3	8.407	107 (172)	982	30 (76)	Unknown	Western United States Midwestern United States Northeastern United States Eastern Canada	Unknown	0
Season aggregates
10 RSI storms	November 13 – April 14				968	52 (130)	0.5 (1.3)		≥ $264.91 million	30

== See also ==
- 2018–19 European windstorm season

Preceded by 2017–18	North American winters 2018–19	Succeeded by 2019–20
