= April 2019 North American blizzard =

Weather event in the United States

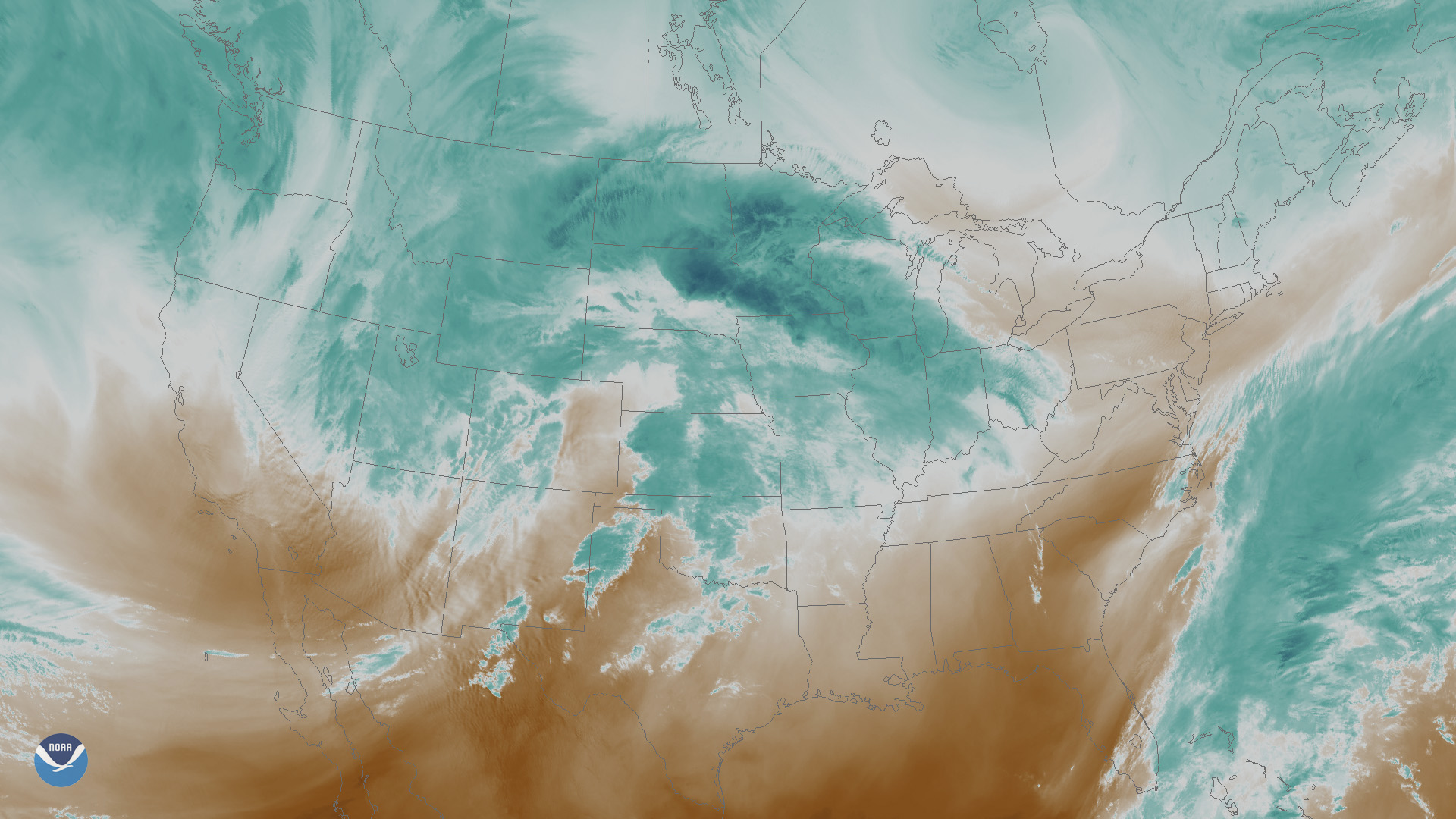
- Water vapor satellite image of the storm April 10.

Meteorological history
- Formed: April 10, 2019
- Dissipated: April 14, 2019

Category 3 "Major" winter storm
- Regional snowfall index: 8.51 (NOAA)
- Highest gusts: 107 mph (172 km/h) at Pueblo West, Colorado
- Lowest pressure: 982 mbar (hPa); 29.00 inHg
- Max. snowfall: 30.0 inches (76 centimeters) of snow in Wallace, South Dakota

Overall effects
- Areas affected: Western United States; Central United States; Eastern United States; Eastern Canada
- Power outages: 139,000+
- Part of the 2018–19 North American winter

The April 2019 North American blizzard was a historic blizzard that occurred in the month of April in the Great Plains and the Midwest. As strong winds and heavy snowfall were anticipated to produce widespread reductions in visibility, a blizzard warning was issued from northeastern Colorado to southwestern Minnesota, including several large cities. Denver, Cheyenne, Mitchell and Kearney were all included. Winds gusted as high as 107 mph (172 km/h) at Pueblo West and more than 30 inches (76 centimeters) of snow fell in Wallace, South Dakota.

== Meteorological history ==
The storm developed over the Pacific Northwest on April 9, hitting the Rockies with intense snowfall April 10. Afterwards, the area of low pressure tracked into the Northern Plains, spreading blizzard conditions from Northeastern Colorado up into Minnesota. Soon afterward, the winter storm bombed out and became a powerful bomb cyclone, reaching its peak intensity early on April 11. As the blizzard approached the Great Lakes region, the storm started weakening and most winter weather-related warnings previously issued by the National Weather Service were discontinued on April 12.

== Impacts ==
=== California ===
Before the storm reached Colorado, and developed into a powerful Colorado low, strong winds cut power to 50,000 in Los Angeles.

=== Nevada ===
The same powerful winds that affected California kicked up dust storms in Nevada.

=== Colorado ===
Heavy snowfall, accompanied by lightning and thunder in some localities, dumped up to 30 inches (76 centimetres) of snow in the Rocky Mountains. Meanwhile, official blizzard conditions occurred in the Northeast quadrant of the state. Portions of I-70 closed as messy roads caused car accidents. A baseball game at Coors Field between the Colorado Rockies and Atlanta Braves was postponed. A soccer game between Seattle Sounders FC and Colorado Rapids was also postponed.

=== New Mexico ===
Wind gusts exceeding hurricane-force (74 mph (119 km/h) affected the state April 10th as the storm's large circulation passed to the north. Officials were on high alert for brush fires because of these hot, dry winds.

=== Wyoming ===
Cheyenne was put under a blizzard warning in anticipation of widespread reduced visibility as a result of high winds and heavy snowfall. Many of Laramie County's offices had to be closed. According to the Laramie County School District administrator, Mary Quast, the schools would have an early release, and status regarding the re-opening of the district would be communicated by six in the morning on the 11th.

Gillette, on the other side of the state, reported 6 inches of snow while Wheeler reported 16 inches.

=== Nebraska ===
Interstate 80 was closed in parts of the Nebraska panhandle as roads became unpassable.

=== South Dakota ===
As many parts of the state were under blizzard warning or winter storm warning, concerns were growing for the potential of flooding following the storm due to snowmelt. The storm may have caused several hundred million dollars in damage. Up to 30 inches fell in eastern South Dakota.

=== Minnesota ===
Nearly 25 inches (63.5 centimetres) fell in the southwestern part of the state. Near Madison, there was ice accretion of half an inch, which accumulated in southern Minnesota and winds frequently gusted in excess of 40 miles per hour (64 km/h). The combination of high winds and significant icing resulted in over 89,000+ power outages across the Midwest, mostly in Minnesota. Another MLB game was postponed, this time between the Minnesota Twins and Texas Rangers.

=== Illinois ===
A baseball game between the Chicago Cubs and Los Angeles Angels was postponed.

== See also ==
- 2019 Midwestern U.S. floods
- March 2019 North American blizzard
- April 2016 North American storm complex
- March 2014 nor'easter
- March 2014 North American winter storm
- March 2013 nor'easter
