= First Presbyterian Church (Wetumpka, Alabama) =

Historic church in Alabama, United States

- U.S. National Register of Historic Places
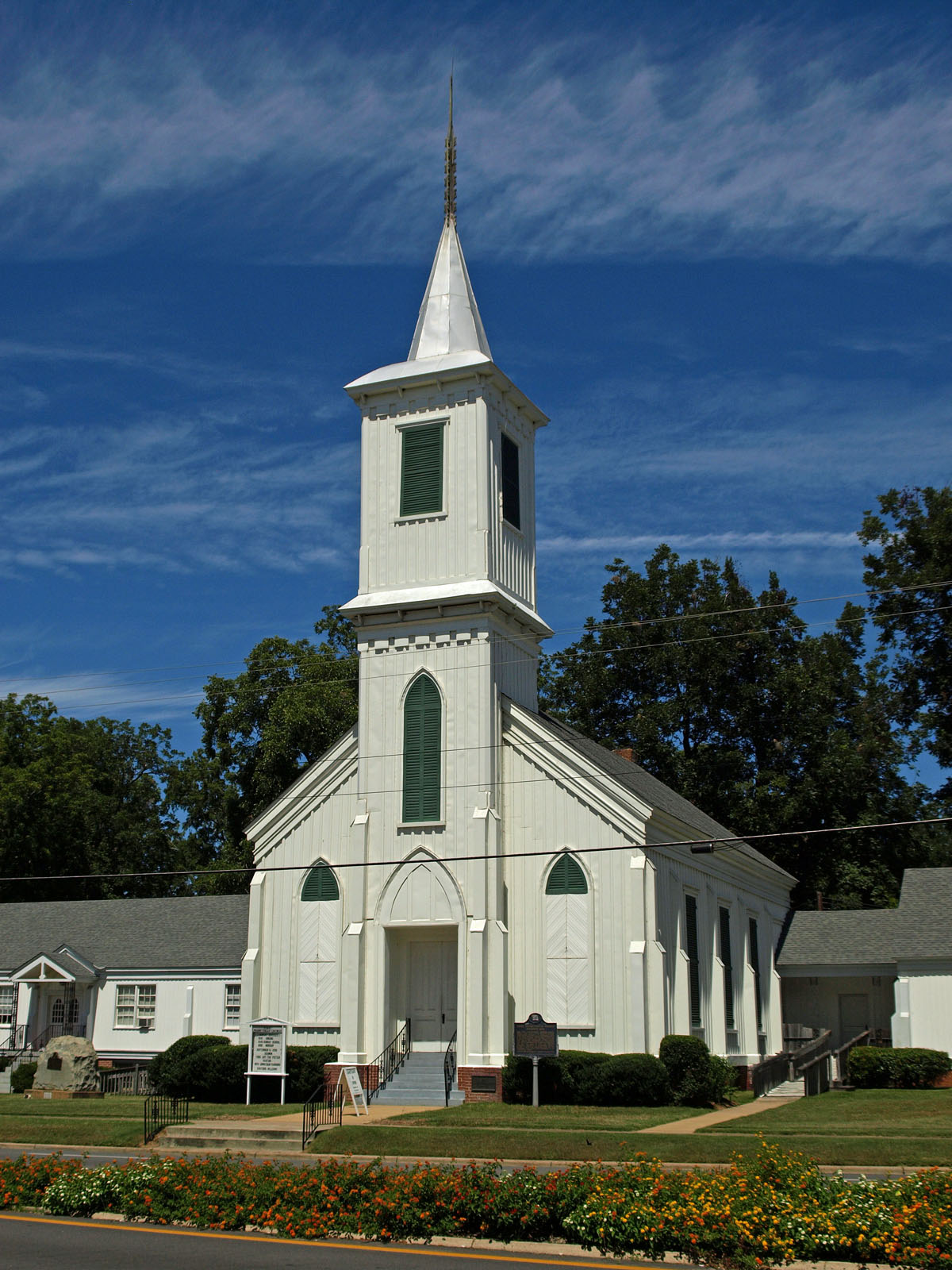
- The building as it appeared in 2010.

- Location within Alabama Location within the United States
- Location: 100 West Bridge Street; Wetumpka, Alabama
- Coordinates: 32°32′21″N 86°12′31″W
- Area: 2 acres (0.81 ha)
- Built: 1856
- Architectural style: Gothic Revival
- Demolished: 2019
- NRHP reference No.: 76000324
- Added to NRHP: October 8, 1976

First Presbyterian Church was a historic Presbyterian church building and congregation at 100 West Bridge Street in Wetumpka, Alabama, United States. The Carpenter Gothic structure was built by a local builder in 1856 at a cost of $2,300. It featured a Gothic Revival exterior and a Greek Revival interior. The finished building was dedicated on June 14, 1857. It was added to the National Register of Historic Places in 1976.

Notable past members included the secessionist Congressman William Lowndes Yancey and Alabama's 11th governor Benjamin Fitzpatrick. The Wetumpka Light Guard departed for service in the Confederate States Army from the church's lawn in 1861. Following the American Civil War, Senator John H. Bankhead was married here to Tallulah James Brockman.

The historic church building was destroyed by an EF2 tornado on January 19, 2019. On January 22, 2019, Pastor Jonathan Yarboro stated that the first step will be to salvage anything that is left and that the congregation is committed to rebuilding the church as it was before the storm.
