= November 2018 North American winter storm =

2018 winter storm in North America

Meteorological history
- Formed: November 13, 2018
- Dissipated: November 15, 2018

Category 1 "Notable" winter storm
- Regional snowfall index: 2.02 (NOAA)
- Highest gusts: 67 mph (108 km/h) in Great Gull Island, New York
- Max. snowfall: 18.3 in (46 cm) in Mount Hope, New York

Overall effects
- Fatalities: 11
- Damage: $250 million (2018 USD)
- Areas affected: Southeastern United States, Midwestern United States, Mid-Atlantic states
- Power outages: 190,000
- Part of the 2018–19 North American winter

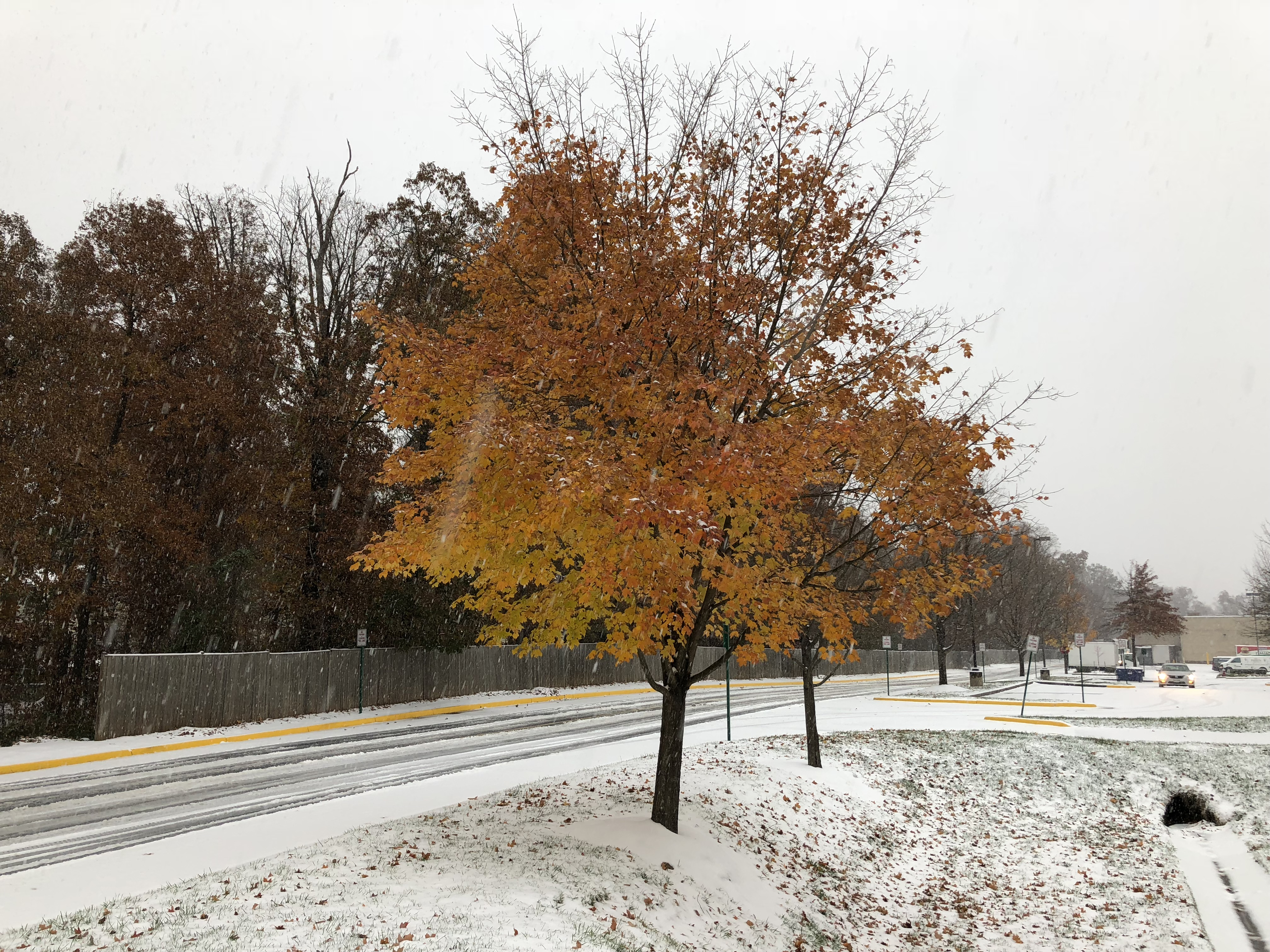
Autumn leaves fell alongside the snow during the mid-November winter storm in Washington, D.C.'s northern Virginia suburbs

An early season winter storm developed in a deep dive of the jet stream into the mid-south on November 13. The storm was unofficially named Winter Storm Avery by The Weather Channel.

== Preparations ==
Despite the European model consistently forecasting 6 in (15 cm) of snow from the storm, the National Weather Service of New York City initially predicted just 1 in (2.5 cm). Not until the afternoon of the storm did they raise the forecast into the 2–5 in (5.1–12.7 cm) zone, which prompted a winter weather advisory to be issued. Forecasts were also underestimating snow in other locations, such as Harrisburg, Pennsylvania. Ultimately, little preparations were done before the storm.

== Impact ==
As a result of the winter storm, around 190,000 customers lost power, with 1,615 flights being cancelled.

=== Deep South ===
Houston recorded a trace of snow due to the event, becoming the earliest they’ve ever recorded snowflakes, breaking the previous record by ten days. In Monroe, Louisiana 0.4 in (1.0 cm) of snow accumulated on the morning of November 14, breaking the record for the earliest snowfall by 10 days. In Mississippi light snow was reported in Greenville, sleet in Tupelo and Memphis, Tennessee picked up 0.6 in (1.5 cm) of snow. Two people died, and 44 were injured, when a bus was overturned in Mississippi. Three other fatalities occurred in Arkansas.

=== Midwest ===
in Ohio, ice accumulations of one-quarter to one-third of an inch were reported in Cincinnati and the Dayton metropolitan area as well as parts of Northern and Central Kentucky. A general 2 to 5 in (5 to 13 cm) of snow fell in the St. Louis metro with isolated reports of 9 in (23 cm). Throughout the Midwest, four people died, with two deaths in Ohio, and one each in Michigan and Indiana.

=== Northeast ===
On November 15, as the storm headed northeastward, an unexpected 6.4 in (16 cm) of snow fell in Central Park, which became their earliest six inch snowfall on record, as well as their second largest November winter storm on record, which caught many off guard and resulted in several hour-long commutes that night. The Port Authority of New York and New Jersey was also forced to cancel over 1,100 buses. New Jersey Transit was forced to suspend service on multiple commuter rail lines, due to damage to overhead wires. This was considered by some as one of New York City's worst commutes, as some were over ten hours, and New Jersey reported 555 car crashes. In West Orange, New Jersey, a school district was forced to keep students overnight as buses could not make it to the school due to closures along Interstate 280. Airport delays at Newark Liberty International Airport reached an average of 5 hours. New Jersey reported one fatality: a person died due to the storm in a traffic related incident. Another fatality in the region occurred in Maryland. Aside from snow, many locations saw wind gusts eclipse 60 mph (97 km/h), with the strongest gust of 67 mph (108 km/h) occurring in Great Gull Island. The melted snow from this storm made 2018 the wettest year on record in Baltimore. The colder air that helped make the snow more intense then originally forecasted also led to daily record lows in Massena, New York, Montpelier, Vermont, Caribou, Maine and Bangor, Maine. The lowest temperatures in the region were at Estcourt Station, Maine at −5 °F (−21 °C).

== Aftermath ==
The Port Authority of New York and New Jersey was so unprepared for the winter storm that the sanitation department needed to be called in to clear the George Washington Bridge, which was shut down due to multiple accidents. Even as of 8am on November 16, many buses were still experiencing delays from the night before, although the subway system was mostly on time. All New York City school field trips on November 16 were cancelled as a result of the storm. Mayor Bill de Blasio promised a full review of the traffic failure in New York City in the aftermath of the storm. Phil Murphy, governor of New Jersey stated that while the lousy forecast was partly to blame, more preparations on his end could have been done as well. The ice caused trees to fall at Shenandoah National Park, closing the southern portion of the park.
