= January–February 2019 North American cold wave =

Fatal cold wave in the US and Canada

- Surface temperatures from January 24 to 29, 2019

Meteorological history
- Formed: January 24, 2019
- Dissipated: Early March 2019

Cold wave
- Lowest temp: −56 °F (−49 °C) in Cotton, Minnesota, on January 27 and 31

Overall effects
- Fatalities: 22
- Damage: $950 million
- Areas affected: Eastern Canada; Central United States; Eastern United States; Pacific Northwest; Western Canada
- Part of the 2018–19 North American winter

In late January 2019, a severe cold wave caused by a weakened jet stream around the Arctic polar vortex hit the Midwestern United States and Eastern Canada, killing at least 22 people. It came after a winter storm brought up to 13 inches (33 cm) of snow in some regions from January 27–29, and brought the lowest temperatures in over 20 years to most locations in the affected region, including some all-time record lows. In early February, a concentration of Arctic air colloquially referred to as the "polar vortex" moved west, and became locked over Western Canada and the Western United States. As a result, February 2019 was among the coldest and snowiest on record in these regions. In early March, the cold once again shifted east, breaking records in many areas. In mid-March, the cold wave finally retreated, but combined with above-average temperatures, precipitation, and a deep snowpack, widespread flooding ensued in the Central US.

== Meteorology ==
The polar vortex as captured by the Atmospheric infrared sounder

Normally, the Northern Hemisphere jet stream travels fast enough to keep the concentration of Arctic air known as the "polar vortex" stationary in the stratosphere over the North Pole. From late December to early January, a sudden stratospheric warming event was observed over the Arctic, which caused the "polar vortex" to weaken and split into three lobes. In late January 2019, one of these lobes traveled southward and stalled over central Canada and north-central United States for about a week before the upper-level flow of the atmosphere directed it over to Western Canada. The influx of frigid air from the North Pole created high winds, and brought extreme sub-zero temperatures, further exacerbated by severe wind chill. Large amounts of snow fell in the affected area. Some have attributed the unusual weather pattern to climate change.

== Impact ==
At least 22 deaths in North America have been directly attributed to the cold wave, with several of these people frozen to death (hypothermia).

Around 2,700 flights were canceled on January 30, with 2,000 canceled the next day. Amtrak also canceled several trains.

=== Canada ===
The "polar vortex" split into three parts, with the dominant part setting up over the Great Lakes and Nunavut. This gave prairie Canada and northern Ontario a persistent northern flow, leading to record cold temperatures.

==== Alberta ====
On February 3, Calgary recorded a temperature of −27.7 °C (−17.9 °F) and a wind chill of −39 °C (−38 °F). On February 5, the city dropped to −28.9 °C (−20.0 °F) and a wind chill of −36 °C (−33 °F). The coldest was actually −41 °C (−42 °F) that was located in Red Deer.

On February 5, Edmonton recorded a temperature of −32.3 °C (−26.1 °F) and a wind chill of −37 °C (−35 °F), as a result of the "polar vortex" making its way west.

Extreme cold carried into March, with temperatures hitting −31.2 °C (−24.2 °F) in Calgary on the second, and −38.6 °C (−37.5 °F) in Lethbridge, the coldest March temperature ever recorded in the city. Temperatures dropped to −38.0 °C (−36.4 °F) in Medicine Hat, only 0.9 away from the March record low.

==== British Columbia ====
On February 4, the temperature in Richmond dropped to −5.6 °C (21.9 °F) with a wind chill of −11 °C (12 °F).

On the same day, the temperature in Abbotsford dropped to −9 °C (16 °F) with a wind chill of −20 °C (−4 °F).

Again on the same day, the daily high in downtown Victoria was at −0.9 °C (30.4 °F), the first time the daily high was below freezing since January 2017. The next day, on February 5, the city's temperature dropped to −7 °C (19 °F) with a wind chill of −9 °C (16 °F).

Prince George dropped to as low as −36.2 °C (−33.2 °F) with a wind chill of −43 °C (−45 °F) on February 4. On February 11 the city recorded a temperature of −32.7 °C (−26.9 °F) with a wind chill of −39 °C (−38 °F).

Vancouver recorded a temperature of −4.3 °C (24.3 °F) on February 5. On February 11 the city surpassed this, dropping to −4.4 °C (24.1 °F). Vancouver had its coldest February on record. One benefit from the cold, however, was that it killed many Japanese beetles, an invasive species to the area.

On February 5, Kelowna dropped to −20.3 °C (−4.5 °F) with a wind chill of −24 °C (−11 °F). The next day, on February 6, the wind chill dropped to as low as −26 °C (−15 °F). On February 10 the temperature in the city dropped to −20.8 °C (−5.4 °F) with a wind chill of −27 °C (−17 °F).

Temperatures reached −20.7 °C (−5.3 °F) in Ashcroft on February 5, the coldest temperature recorded in February since record keeping began in 2010. This record was broken again on the 10th when it reached −21.7 °C (−7.1 °F).

On February 6, the temperature in Nanaimo dropped to −6.7 °C (19.9 °F) and a wind chill of −9 °C (16 °F).

==== Manitoba ====
In Winnipeg, Manitoba, temperatures reached as low as −40 °C (−40 °F), the coldest temperature recorded in the city since February 2007, when it reached −42 °C (−44 °F).

==== Northwest Territories ====
On February 2, the temperature in Yellowknife dropped to −42.9 °C (−45.2 °F) and a wind chill of −53 °C (−63 °F).

==== Nunavut ====
Environment Canada issued extreme cold warnings for most of Nunavut. The temperature in Baker Lake dropped to a frigid −41 °C (−42 °F) with a wind chill of −59 °C (−74 °F), its lowest recorded wind chill on record. On January 25, Shepherd Bay recorded −48.8 °C (−55.8 °F).

==== Ontario ====
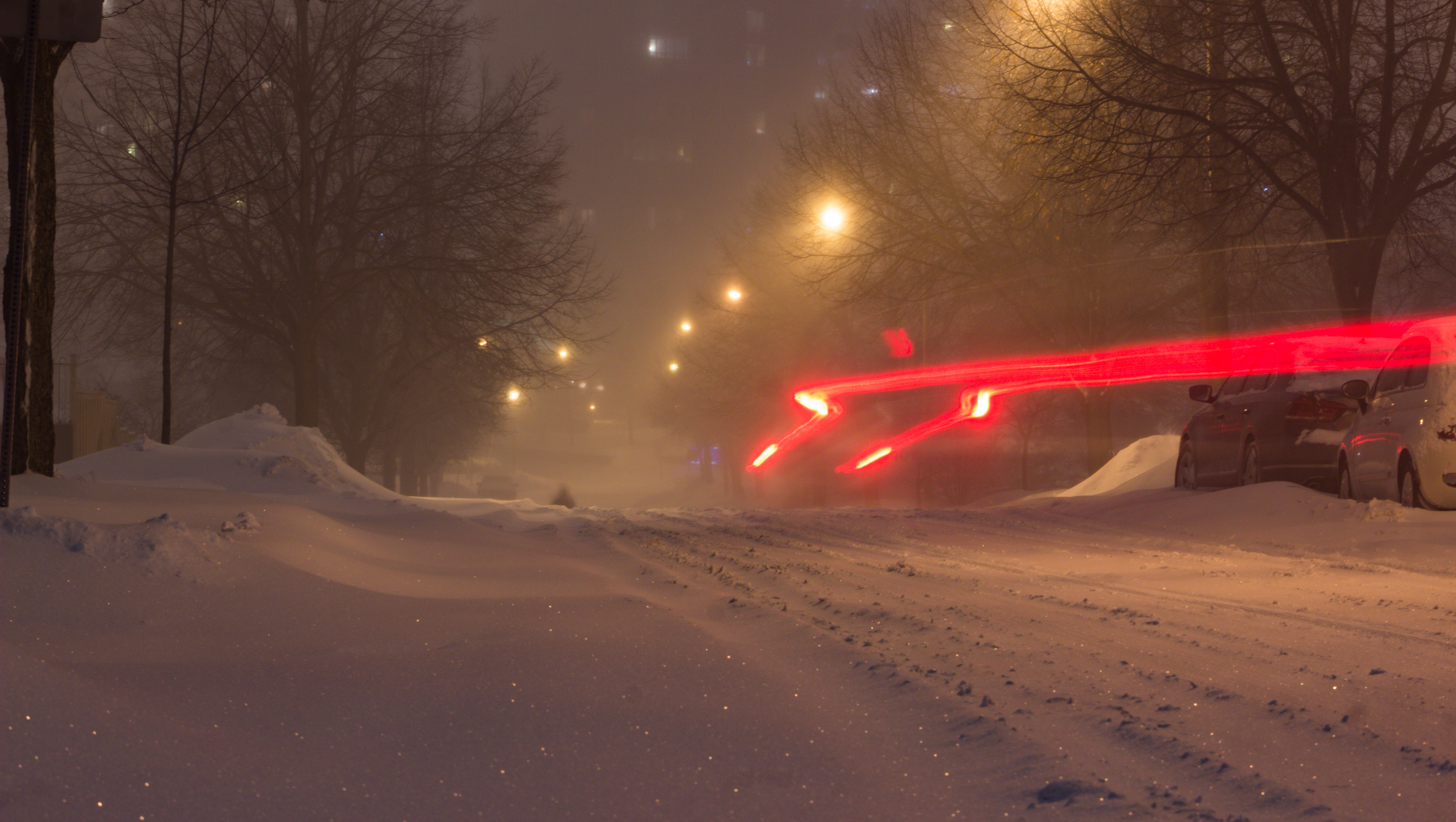
Toronto snowstorm

Ottawa experienced its snowiest January on record with temperatures as low as −25 °C (−13 °F). Toronto experienced the largest snowstorm in six years with 33 centimetres (13 in) of snow accumulating at Toronto Pearson International Airport, before dropping to a low of −22.8 °C (−9.0 °F), with a wind chill of −38 °C (−36 °F). Many local schools and universities cancelled classes due to the weather. At Niagara Falls, the falls were left partially frozen by the extreme temperatures.

On January 31, Windsor reached −24.8 °C (−12.6 °F) with a wind chill of −40 °C (−40 °F). Warming centres were set up in Windsor and Chatham-Kent libraries for homeless people and anyone else affected by the cold. On the same day, London dropped to −26 °C (−15 °F) with a wind chill of −39 °C (−38 °F). Temperatures in St. Catharines dropped to −20 °C (−4 °F). with a wind chill of −35 °C (−31 °F), while Port Colborne fell to −18 °C (0 °F) with a wind chill of −31 °C (−24 °F).

==== Quebec ====
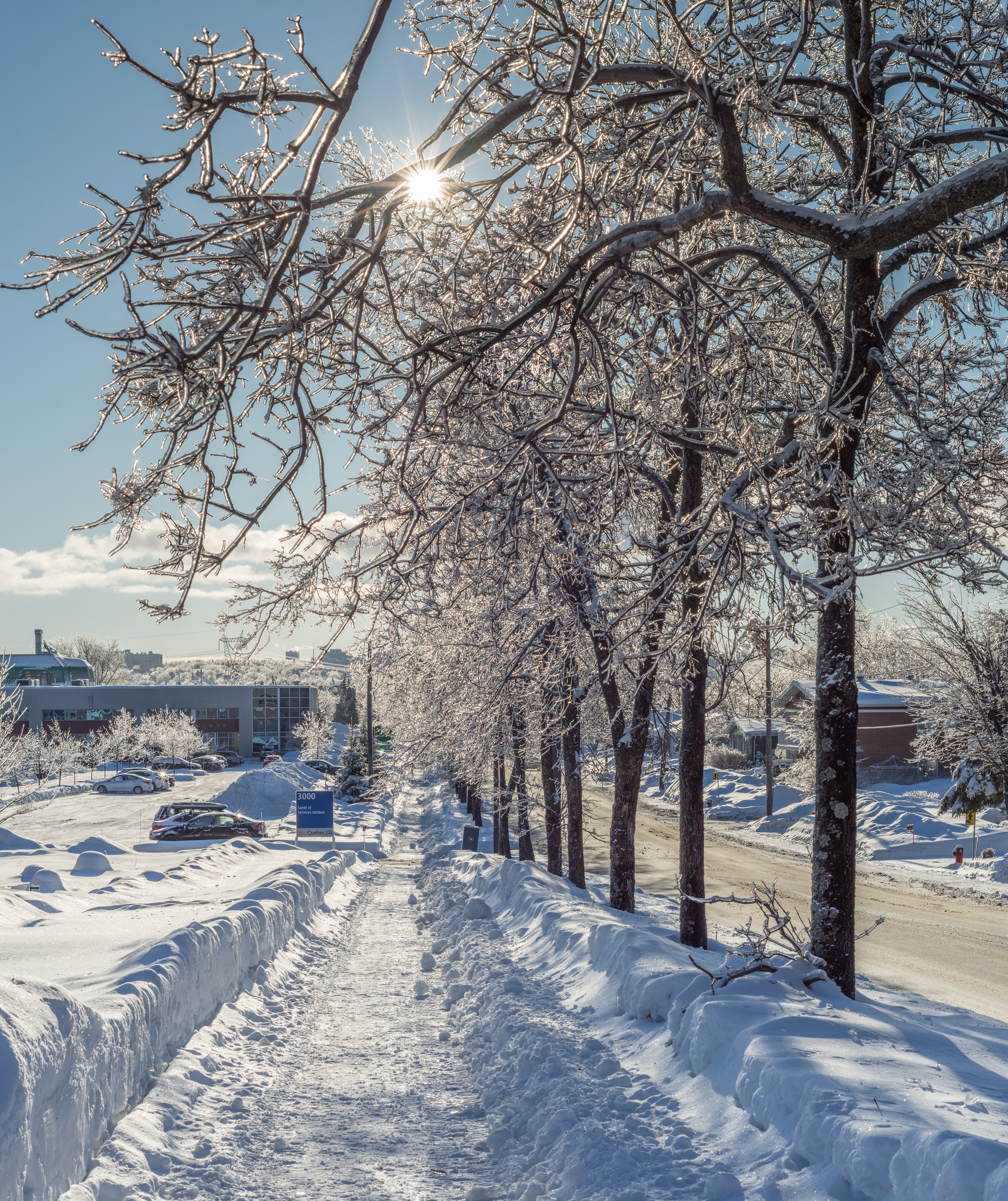
January 25, 2019, in Quebec

The cold snap in Montreal began with a blizzard where base temperatures reached −15 °C (5 °F). The combination with a single-day 25 centimetres (10 in) snowfall was the coldest snowiest day in nearly a century. The Fête des neiges winter festival was cancelled due to the extreme cold for the first time in a decade.

Among those killed by the cold was Hélène Rowley Hotte, the 93-year-old mother of Gilles Duceppe, a former federal opposition leader. She was found outside her seniors' residence after being accidentally locked out following a fire alarm.

==== Saskatchewan ====
In Saskatoon temperatures plummeted to as low as −42.6 °C (−44.7 °F) with a frigid wind chill of −52 °C (−62 °F) on February 6.

On February 8, temperatures dropped to −42 °C (−44 °F) and a wind chill of −47 °C (−53 °F) in Regina.

The cold continued throughout the rest of February, resulting in one of the coldest Februaries on record there.

=== United States ===
==== California ====
On February 4, the temperature in Eureka dropped to 34 °F (1 °C), and the city experienced the coldest February 4 in 30 years. On February 5, the temperature dropped to 29 °F (−2 °C), also the coldest recorded for that date for 30 years. On February 6, the minimum was 36 °F (2 °C), the coldest temperature recorded for that date since 2005. In Humboldt County, snow fell on the beaches for the first time in 16 years.

On February 4, 2019, in the Bay Area there was .1 inches (0.25 cm) of snow, with a temperature of 31.5 °F (−0.3 °C). Around the Sierra Nevada Mountain range the temperature there was 12 °F (−11 °C) and 26 inches (66 cm) of snow fell between February 4 and February 16. This year had the most significant snowfall in California since 2011.

In Downtown Los Angeles, the temperature never reached 70 °F (21 °C) the entire month of February, the first ever occurrence in 142 years of record-keeping. On February 22, snow was reported in the lower elevations West Hollywood, Eagle Rock and Pasadena within the urban areas of Los Angeles.

Across the state, the persistent cold and heavy rains were beneficial in eliminating drought conditions in California for the first time since 2011.

==== District of Columbia ====
In the early morning of January 31, 2019, Washington, D.C., as measured at Ronald Reagan Washington National Airport, reached 10 °F (−12 °C). The wind chill reached −3 °F (−19 °C). Nearby Washington Dulles International Airport reached an air temperature of −2 °F (−19 °C), the coldest reading since another cold spell in February 2015.

==== Illinois ====
'Chicago Beach Keeps Locals Warm During Polar Vortex' – video new report from Voice of America.

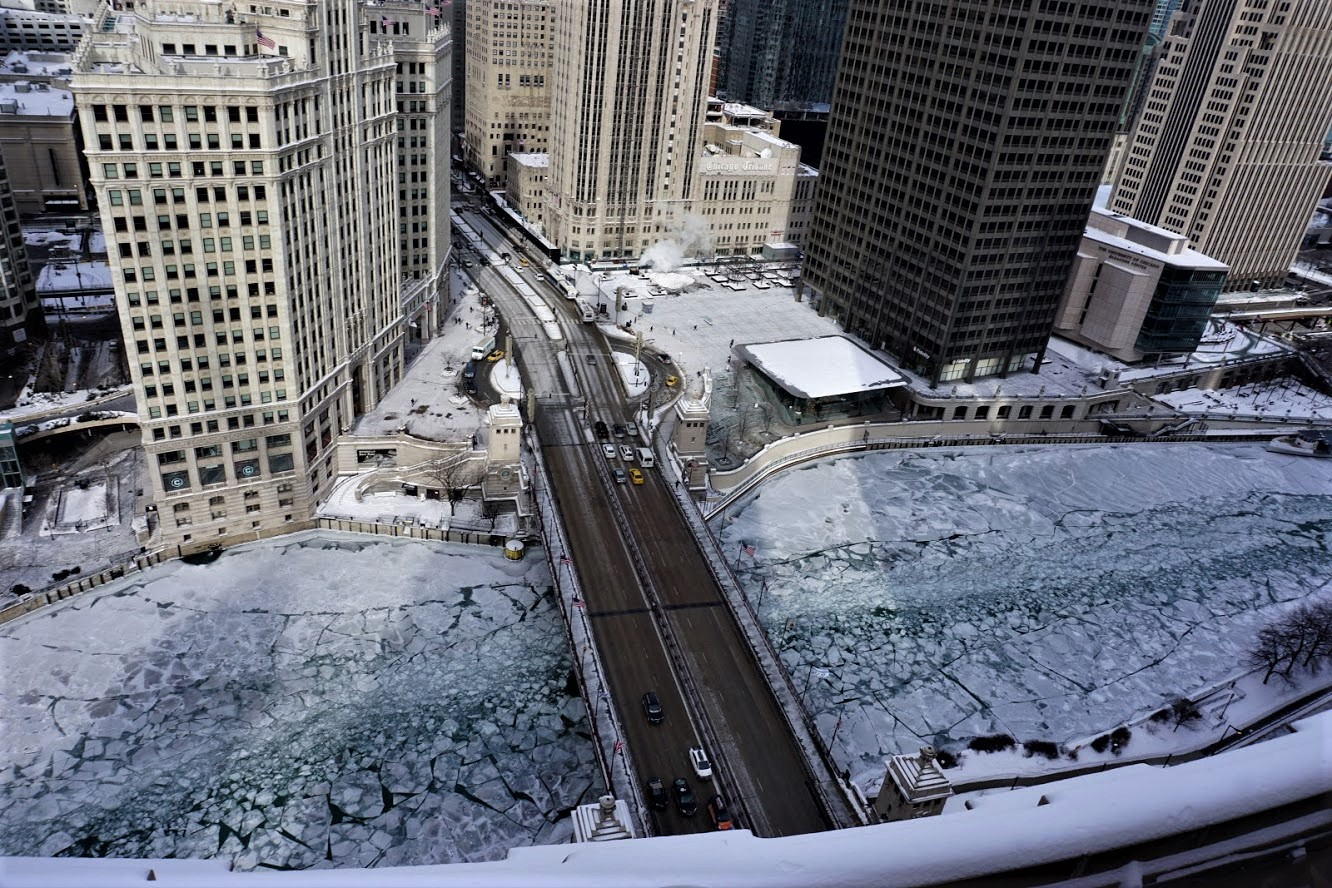
Chicago river frozen during 2019 polar vortex February 1, 2019

In the Chicago area, temperatures plummeted as low as −23 °F (−31 °C) at O'Hare International Airport on January 30, with a windchill of −52 °F (−47 °C). Chicago's Northerly Island recorded temperatures as low as −21 °F (−29 °C) and Chicago's Midway International Airport recorded a temperature of −22 °F (−30 °C); O'Hare's maximum of −10 °F (−23 °C) that day was a daily record and also only 1 °F (0.56 °C) higher than Chicago's official record cold maximum set on January 18, 1994, and December 24, 1983. Chicago also reached record lows on January 31, with a temperature of −21 °F (−29 °C) and a windchill of −41 °F (−41 °C).

Rockford reached an all-time record low of −31 °F (−35 °C), shattering the old record of −27 °F (−33 °C) from 1982. Moline in the Quad Cities reached an all-time record low of −33 °F (−36 °C). In Mount Carroll, a temperature of −38 °F (−39 °C) was recorded on January 30. Now verified, this is the all-time lowest temperature in the state of Illinois.

Several people died in Chicago due to the cold. The cold wave resulted in 1,444 flights being cancelled at O'Hare, and 254 flights being cancelled at Midway.

==== Indiana ====
Temperatures in Indianapolis plummeted as low as −11 °F (−24 °C) on January 30, tying the record low, with a wind chill of −41 °F (−41 °C). Kokomo recorded a wind chill of −49 °F (−45 °C) while Evansville recorded wind chills as low as −19 °F (−28 °C).

Hundreds of schools and businesses closed and the United States Postal Service suspended delivery service on Wednesday, January 30 and Thursday, January 31.

Temperatures in South Bend plummeted as low as −20 °F (−29 °C), and all classes at the University of Notre Dame were cancelled. Other major universities in the state, such as Indiana University, Purdue University and Ball State University, also cancelled all classes.

==== Iowa ====
Temperatures broke records, with the coldest temperature ever recorded at −30 °F (−34 °C) on January 31, 2019. Wind chills got dangerously low as −58 °F (−50 °C) on January 30, 2019. Most universities closed, including Iowa State University, University of Northern Iowa, and the University of Iowa. University of Iowa student Gerald Belz died after being found unresponsive near Halsey Hall.

==== Kentucky ====
After windchill temperatures were predicted to plunge to between 10 °F (−12 °C) to 20 °F (−7 °C), many Kentucky schools closed.

Two brothers in Boone County, Obie (72) and Roy Fugate (67), died in their driveway outside of their home due to the cold after their truck was stuck in the mud.

==== Michigan ====
On January 28, Michigan Governor Gretchen Whitmer declared a state of emergency due to the record low windchill temperatures. Three people died due to the extremely low temperatures in Michigan: one in Detroit, another in Ecorse, and a third in East Lansing.

On January 31, the city of Flint recorded a low temperature of −14 °F (−26 °C), breaking the record for that date of −8 °F (−22 °C), set in 1963. The previous day's maximum temperature of 2 °F (−17 °C) broke the record cold maximum of 8 °F (−13 °C) set in 1951. In Metro Detroit on January 31, temperatures were between −5 °F (−21 °C) to −15 °F (−26 °C) with windchill values between −20 °F (−29 °C) and −40 °F (−40 °C). The community named Hell in Livingston County was declared to be frozen over on January 31.

Whitmer and Consumers Energy asked residents to turn down their thermostats to 65 °F (18 °C) until midnight ET on February 1, after a fire at the compressor station in Macomb County on January 30 due to extra gas usage during the cold wave, to avoid "heat interruptions".

The United States Postal Service suspended mail delivery on January 30 and 31 for most of Michigan.

Hundreds of Michigan schools and businesses were closed for the entire week.

==== Minnesota ====
The town of Cotton (near Duluth) was the coldest location in the country with a low of −56 °F (−49 °C) on January 30, 4 °F (2.2 °C) shy of the all-time state record low in Minnesota. The coldest wind chill was −66 °F (−54 °C) recorded at Ponsford.

On January 30, Minneapolis recorded a minimum temperature of −28 °F (−33 °C) with a windchill of −49 °F (−45 °C), the coldest since 1996.

On January 29, at 10:30 p.m., about 150 homes in the Princeton area, about an hour north of Minneapolis, lost natural gas service. As a result, Xcel Energy resorted to asking over 400,000 customers to turn their thermostats down to 63 °F (17 °C) to conserve natural gas through Thursday.

==== Montana ====
Montana saw some of the worst effects from the cold wave, which lingered into early March. The cold front in Montana didn’t hit until February 2, with highs of 55 °F (13 °C) in Great Falls. That would be the last high above freezing for Great Falls for 32 days. The average temperature in Great Falls was −0.20 °F (−17.89 °C), the second coldest February on record. The state ultimately saw their second coldest February on record.

On March 3, Elk Park Pass hit −46 °F (−43 °C), setting a statewide low temperature record for March. On March 3, Great Falls tied a monthly record low of −32 °F (−36 °C).

==== New York ====
In New York City, the temperature on January 31 reached 2 °F (−17 °C) with a windchill of −17 °F (−27 °C). The temperature at noon was still only 10 °F (−12 °C). The high was only 16 °F (−9 °C). This tied a record cold high for the day. Islip, New York set a record low on the morning of January 31 at −3 °F (−19 °C).

In Williamsville (near Buffalo), a locally well-known homeless man, Lawrence "Larry" Bierl, was found frozen to death in a bus shelter on the morning of January 31. The wind chill that previous night was −25 °F (−32 °C).

Following a January 27 electrical fire at the federal Metropolitan Detention Center, Brooklyn, over 1,600 inmates were held with little or no heat or electricity until power was restored on February 3. Numerous inmates reported ill health and were seen banging on windows for help. Activists and some New York officials became involved in seeking to improve conditions. Governor Andrew Cuomo announced on February 4 that the United States Department of Justice would be investigating the outage.

==== North Dakota ====
Grand Forks experienced a windchill value of −65 °F (−54 °C). The cold wave made February 2019 the second coldest February in North Dakota.

==== Washington ====
A snowstorm on February 3–4 brought 0.5 to 4 inches (1.3 to 10.2 cm) of snow to parts of Western Washington, including the Puget Sound region, after a winter without measurable snowfall. It was caused by cold air arriving from the north alongside a low-pressure system, dropping temperatures to the 30s and 40s. The snowstorm caused minor disruptions, including school releases and flight cancellations at Seattle–Tacoma International Airport. Daytime temperatures continued to drop throughout the week, reaching as low as 19 °F (−7 °C) and causing black ice to form on roads.

A second snowstorm struck the Seattle area and Western Washington on February 8, bringing 4 to 8 inches (10 to 20 cm) of snow that triggered a state of emergency from Governor Jay Inslee. The storm disrupted numerous services and caused shortages of supplies at grocery stores. At least one person died as a result of exposure. The rare intensity of the snowstorm has been described as the strongest that Seattle had seen in over a decade and crippled the city. The snowstorm continued for the next 3 days, with 1.5 inches (3.8 cm) falling on the 9th, 3.5 inches (8.9 cm) on the 10th, and 6.1 inches (15 cm) on the 11th, before the snow turned to rain after that, for a total of 17.5 inches (44 cm) of snow over a 4-day period. This was the most snow that the Seattle area had seen over a 4-day period since 1969.

==== Wisconsin ====
On January 28, Wisconsin Governor Tony Evers declared a state of emergency due to the record low windchill temperatures.

A 55-year-old man froze to death in Milwaukee.

Milwaukee reached record lows on January 31, with a temperature of −21 °F (−29 °C) and a windchill of −40 °F (−40 °C), with some suburbs reaching as low as −30 °F (−34 °C) and a windchill of −50 °F (−46 °C).

== See also ==
- 2017–18 North American cold wave
- 2018–19 North American winter
- 2019–20 North American winter
- Early 2014 North American cold wave
- February 2021 North American cold wave
