= Weather of 2019 =

The following is a list of weather events in 2019.

== Global conditions ==
2019 was Earth's second-warmest year on record, which goes back to 1880. It was the 43rd consecutive year of above-average temperatures. The year was 0.95 °C (1.71 °F) above the 20th century average, and 0.07 °C (0.04 °F) behind 2016, which was the warmest year on record. 2019 fell to the third-warmest year on record when the following year surpassed it. In 2019, Australia and the U.S. state of Alaska recorded their warmest years on record.

There is a previous El Niño episode continuing from last year, and new El Niño episode started this year, lasting until 2020.

== Summary by weather type ==
=== Winter storms and cold waves ===
From January 16 to 19, a winter storm crosses the United States, killing ten. Then, from January 24 into February, a cold wave brought record low temperatures to the United States. Illinois set a statewide record low temperature. Twenty-two people died as a result. Then, in mid-March, another cross country storm came to the United States, which killed a man in Colorado, left 140,000 without power in Texas, and contributed to the 2019 Midwestern U.S. floods, which caused two deaths in Nebraska and one in Iowa. Another blizzard struck the United States in April 2019. In October 2019, record cold and near-record cold came down over the Pacific Northwest and Northern Plains. In particular, with a mean statewide temperature of 36.7 °F (2.6 °C), Idaho saw its coldest October on record. The next major winter storm in the United States came next season, when a cold wave that killed 7 people. The last notable blizzard is the November 26 – December 3, 2019 North American blizzard. Eight people died due to the storm, and over 80,000 people in the New York Metropolitan Area lost power.

=== Floods ===
In late January and early February, the Australian city of Townsville experienced record flooding when a stalled but very active monsoon trough that was bought down by Tropical Low 13U, caused an overflowing of the Ross River Dam. Approximately 3300 homes were damaged by floodwaters, and about 1500 homes rendered uninhabitable. As many as 30,000 insurance claims were filed in the aftermath of the event, with damages estimated to be $1.243 billion AUD based on insurance losses. 5 deaths were attributed to the event. The event came after Townsville experienced a drought prior to the flooding. One year prior to the floods, the dam level was at 13%, and during the floods the dam peaked at 244%, before water was released.

=== Tornadoes ===
An EF4 tornado in Havana in January 2019, becomes the strongest in Cuba since 1940. Eight people are killed and 190 are injured. Later on February 23–24, a tornado outbreak across the United States kills one and causes $1.4 billion in damages. Then, on March 3, a deadly tornado outbreak spawns 41 tornadoes. One of them, the 2019 Beauregard tornado, becomes the deadliest tornado since the 2013 Moore tornado and kills 23 people, and injures 97. On March 31, a tornado strikes Nepal. This tornado is responsible for 28 deaths and $800,000 in damage. It was later identified as the first confirmed case of a tornado in Nepal. Then, on April 13–15, 2019, a tornado outbreak in the Southeastern United States kills three. A few days later, another tornado outbreak tied for Mississippi's largest tornado outbreak, As the squall line tracked east, numerous reports of damaging wind gusts were received across the Southeast United States. and also became Virginia's third largest outbreak in a single day. In the second half of May, the United States experienced a record breaking tornado outbreak sequence. On June 29, a rare hybrid tornado struck Allen, South Dakota. A few months later, an EF3 tornado in Dallas became the costliest tornado in Texas history. In November, another tornado outbreak caused a fatality in the Southeastern US. The death was due to an EF2 in Louisiana. The last major tornado outbreak of the year occurs on December 16–17, 2019, which cause 3 deaths, plus one non-tornadic.

=== Tropical cyclones ===
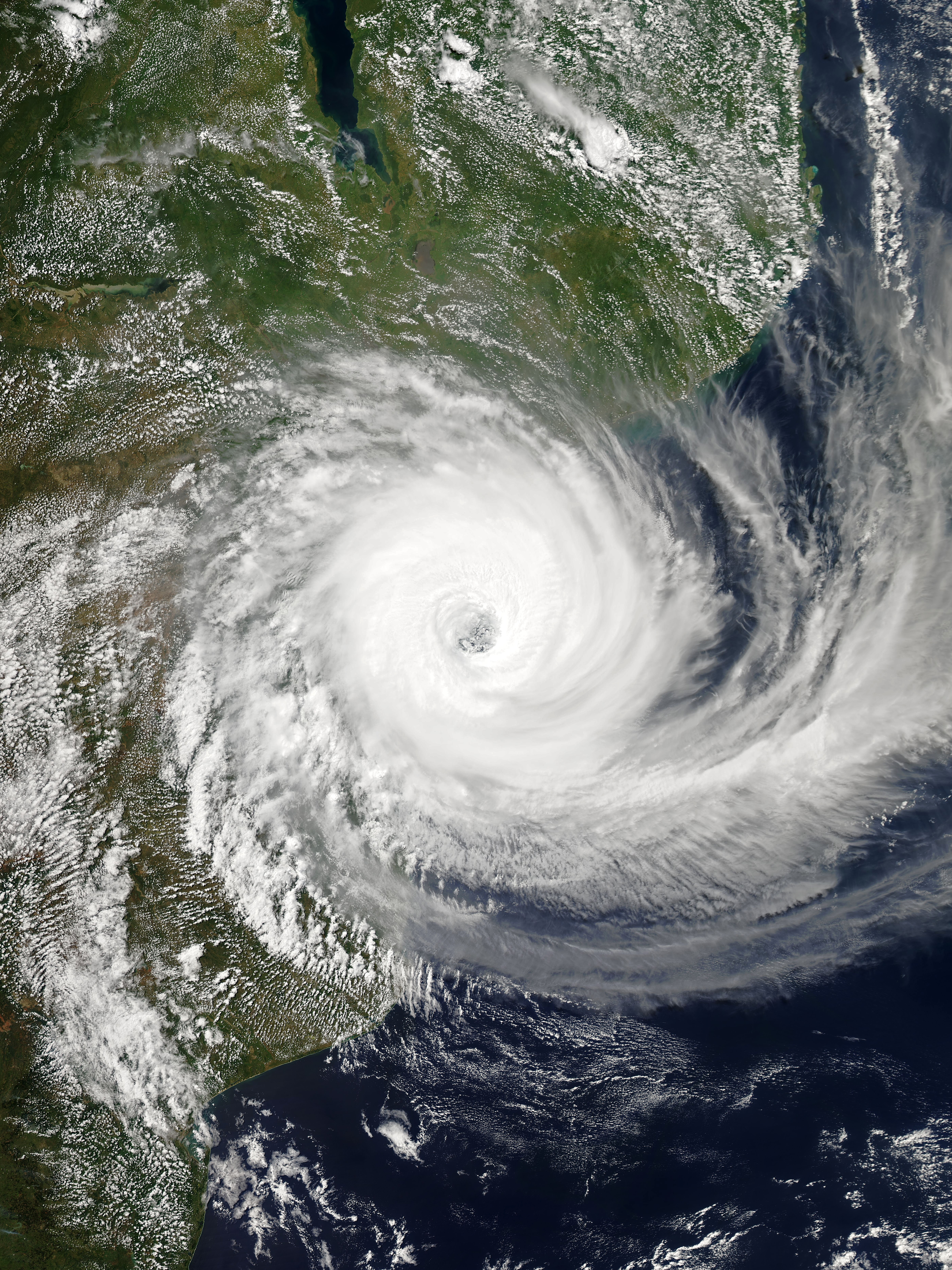
Satellite image of Cyclone Idai, one of the costliest and deadliest tropical cyclones on record in Africa

As the year began, five tropical cyclones that formed in 2018 were still active. Cyclone Penny was moving over Queensland, Cyclone Mona was developing in the eastern Australian region, a tropical depression and a tropical disturbance was in the South Pacific, and Tropical Storm Pabuk was in the South China Sea.

In the south-west Indian Ocean, there were 14 tropical cyclones, including several powerful cyclones. Cyclone Idai struck Mozambique in March and caused widespread flooding across southeast Africa. The cyclone killed at least 1,297 people, becoming one of the deadliest recorded tropical cyclones in Africa, with a damage total of over US$2 billion, the second costliest cyclone on record in the basin. In April, Cyclone Kenneth struck northern Mozambique as the most intense storm on record to hit the country. It killed 52 people in the Comoros and Mozambique. In December, Cyclone Ambali attained 10 minute winds of 220 km/h (140 mph) after the most significant rapid deepening events ever recorded in the southern hemisphere. In the Australian region, there were 15 tropical cyclones, including Cyclone Veronica, which caused A$2 billion (US$1.4 billion) in damage when it struck Western Australia. There were 11 tropical cyclones in the South Pacific Ocean during the year. In the south Atlantic Ocean, there was a rare short-lived tropical storm – Iba – which formed in March off the coast of Brazil.

In the north-west Pacific Ocean, there were 49 tropical cyclones that formed after Pabuk. In August, Typhoon Lekima killed 105 people and caused CN¥65.37 billion (US$9.26 billion) in damage when it struck southeastern China. Also in August, Typhoon Faxai struck Japan, causing US$10 billion in damage, followed less than two months later by Typhoon Hagibis, which hit Tokyo. Hagibis killed 98 people and caused US$15 billion in damage. In the North Indian Ocean, there were 12 tropical cyclones, including Cyclone Pabuk, which moved from the South China Sea into the Bay of Bengal in early January. The season's strongest storm was Cyclone Kyarr in October, which attained winds of 240 km/h (150 mph) in the Arabian Sea. Also during the season, Cyclone Fani struck eastern India, killing 89 people and causing US$8.1 billion in damage.

In the north Atlantic Ocean, there were 18 tropical cyclones and two subtropical cyclones. In September, Hurricane Dorian became the strongest storm on record to hit The Bahamas, with 1 minute sustained winds of 185 mph (295 km/h). Dorian devastated the country as it moved slowly through the island group, causing US$3.4 billion in damage and at least 74 deaths, with hundreds missing. In September, Tropical Storm Imelda moved ashore southeastern Texas and left US$5 billion in damage after dropping 43.15 in (1,096 mm) of rainfall. Also in September, Hurricane Lorenzo attained 1 minute sustained winds of 160 mph (260 km/h) in the eastern Atlantic Ocean. Lorenzo capsized a ship, the Bourbon Rhode, killing 11 crew members, and the storm later struck the Azores, causing €330 million (US$367 million) in damage. In the north-east Pacific Ocean, there were 21 tropical cyclones.

== Timeline ==
This is a timeline of weather events during 2019. Please note that entries might cross between months, however, all entries are listed by the month they started with an exception for Tropical Storm Pabuk which was ongoing when 2019 began. Dates listed in parentheses mean the start and end dates are not specifically listed in the articles.

=== January ===
- December 31, 2018 – January 8, 2019 – Tropical Storm Pabuk, also referred to as Cyclonic Storm Pabuk, kills ten people and caused $157.2 million (2019 USD) in damage across the Natuna Islands, Vietnam, Malay Peninsula, Myanmar, Thailand, and the Andaman Islands.
- January 16–21 – A winter storm struck the United States, killing ten.
- January 22–24 – Tropical Storm Eketsang kills 27 people and caused damage across Madagascar.
- January 24 – Four tornadoes in Turkey killed four people and caused damage.
- January 24 – February (14) – A cold wave across the American Midwest and Great Lakes region killed 22 people.
- January 27 – A nighttime EF4 tornado in Havanna, Cuba kills eight people and injured 193 others. This was the strongest tornado to hit Cuba since 1940.

=== February ===
- February 18 – March 2 – Typhoon Wutip, also known as Tropical Depression Betty, caused $3.3 million (2019 USD) in damage across Guam, the Federated States of Micronesia, and the Northern Mariana Islands.
- February 23 – An EF3 tornado in Mississippi kills one person and injured 19 others.

=== March ===
- March 3 – A severe and deadly tornado outbreak across the Southeastern United States results in 23 fatalities and 103 injuries from 41 tornadoes.
  - March 3 – An EF4 tornado during the Tornado outbreak of March 3 kills 23 people and injured 90 others and caused $1.75 million (2019 USD) in damage across its 68.73 mi (110.61 km) path.
- March 4–21 – Cyclone Idai kills 1,303 with more than 2,262 missing and caused more than $2.2 billion (2019 USD) in damage across Mozambique, Malawi, northern Madagascar, and Zimbabwe. Idai is the deadliest tropical cyclone recorded in the South-West Indian Ocean basin and in the Southern Hemisphere, which includes the Australian, South Pacific, and South Atlantic basins, Idai ranks as the second-deadliest tropical cyclone on record.
- March 8–16 – A blizzard, tornado outbreak, and floods across North America killed four people (1 blizzard and 3 flooding) and caused over 140,000 power outages. The storm system spawned 38 tornadoes and a wind gust of 109 mph (175 km/h) was recorded at Northeast Texas' Grand Prairie Airport.
- March 8–24 – Cyclone Savannah kills ten people with one missing and caused $7.5 million (2019 USD) in damage across Bali, Java, Christmas Island, and the Cocos (Keeling) Islands.
- March 15–26 – Cyclone Trevor caused $700,000 (2019 USD) in damage across Indonesia, Papua New Guinea, Queensland, and Northern Territory, Australia.
- March 18–31 – Cyclone Veronica caused $1.65 billion (2019 USD) in damage across Timor and Western Australia, becoming the Fourth-costliest tropical cyclone in the Australian region basin.
- March 19 - Monthly record highs were set across much of Alaska, British Columbia and Washington State. Seattle's high of 79 °F (26 °C) was the warmest for the November to March period. Some places saw highs that would set records even in April.
- March 31 – A deadly and powerful F4 Tornado hits Nepal which kills between 28 and 50 people and caused $800,000 (2019 USD) in damage. This was the first ever recorded tornado in Nepal.

=== April ===
- April 4–6 – The Goseong Fire kills two people, injured 30 others, burned 1,307 acres, and caused $4.6 million (2019 USD) in damage in South Korea.
- April 10–14 – A blizzard in the United States caused over 139,000 power outages and had wind gusts as high as 107 mph (172 km/h) at Pueblo West, Colorado.
- April 13 – An EF3 tornado in China kills one person and injured five others.
- April 13–15 – A tornado outbreak in the United States kills nine people (3 tornadic and 6 non-tornadic) and injured 65 others from 71 tornadoes.
- April 17–19 – A tornado outbreak in the South Central and Southeastern United States kills four people (all non-tornadic) from 96 tornadoes.
- April 21–29 – Cyclone Kenneth kills 52 people and caused $188 million (2019 USD) in damage across Seychelles, Comoros, Mayotte, northern Madagascar, northern Mozambique, southern Tanzania, and Malawi.
- April 26 – May 5 – Cyclone Fani kills 89 people and caused $8.1 billion (2019 USD) in damage across Odisha, West Bengal, Andhra Pradesh, East India, Bangladesh, Bhutan, and Sri Lanka. Cyclone Fani became the worst tropical cyclone to strike the Indian state of Odisha since 1999.
- April 30 – An EF3 wedge tornado in Oklahoma kills two people and injured nine others.

=== May ===
- May 4–11 – Cyclone Lili caused damage Eastern Indonesia, East Timor, and Top End.
- May 17–30 – A 14-day long tornado outbreak sequence in the United States kills 14 people (8 tornadic and 6 non-tornadic) and injured 288 others from 392 tornadoes.
  - May 27 – An EF4 tornado during the tornado outbreak of May 25–30, 2019 killed one person indirectly and injured 166 others. The National Weather Service issued a particularly dangerous situation and tornado emergency for the tornado as it entered Dayton, Ohio.
- May 18 – June 14 – The Arkansas River Flood of 2019 kills five people and caused $3 billion (2019 USD) in damage across Arkansas and Oklahoma.
- May 31 – An F2 tornado in Chile kills one person and injured 23 others.

=== June ===
- June 8–15 – The Sand Fire of 2019 injured two people and burned 2,512 acres in California.
- June 10–18 – Cyclone Vayu kills eight people and caused $140,000 (2019 USD) in damage across Maldives, India, Pakistan, and Oman.

=== July ===
- July 3 – An EF4 Stovepipe tornado in China kills six people and injured 190 others.
- July 11–19 – Hurricane Barry kills two people and caused $600 million (2019 USD) in damage across the United States and Canada. Hurricane Barry was the wettest tropical cyclone on record in Arkansas and the fourth-wettest in Louisiana.
- July 14 – With a low of 84 °F (29 °C), Miami set a record for their warmest night on record.
- July 14–21 – Tropical Storm Danas kills six people and caused $6.4 million (2019 USD) in damage across the Philippines, Taiwan, Japan, and South Korea.
- July 28 – A F2 tornado in Italy kills one person. This tornado was part of a small 11 tornado outbreak in Europe.
- July 30 – August 4 – Tropical Storm Wipha kills 27 people and caused $76.8 million (2019 USD) in damage across South China, Vietnam, and Laos.
- July (31)–August (8) – Floods in Vadodara killed 8 people.

=== August ===
- August 1–11 – Typhoon Francisco kills two people and caused damage across Japan, Korean Peninsula, and Russia's Far East.
- August 1–29 – Floods in Karnataka, India kills 61 people with 15 missing and caused $4.95 billion (2019 USD) in damage.
- August 2–14 – Typhoon Lekima, also known as Typhoon Hanna, kills 105 people and caused $9.28 billion (2019 USD) in damage across the Caroline Islands, East China, the Philippines, the Ryukyu Islands, Taiwan, and Malaysia. Typhoon Lekima was the second-costliest typhoon in Chinese history.
- August 8–29 – Severe Floods in Kerala, India kills 121 people.
- August 24 – September 7: Hurricane Dorian kills 84 people with 245 missing and caused $5.1 billion (2019 USD) in damage across the Lesser Antilles, Puerto Rico, The Bahamas (especially the Abaco Islands and Grand Bahama), the Eastern United States (especially Florida, Georgia, South Carolina, and North Carolina), and Eastern Canada. Hurricane Dorian became the strongest hurricane on record to hit The Bahamas.
- August 29 – An EF2 tornado in China kills eight people and injured two others.
- August 29 – September 12 – Typhoon Faxai, known in Japan as Reiwa 1 Bōsō Peninsula Typhoon, kills three people and caused $10 billion (2019 USD) in damage across Wake Island and Japan.
- August 31 – September 8 – Typhoon Lingling kills eight people and caused $236 million (2019 USD) in damage across the Philippines, Taiwan, China, Japan, South Korea, North Korea, and Russia.

=== September ===
- September 3–5 – Tropical Storm Fernand kills one person and caused $11.3 million (2019 USD) in damage across Northern Mexico and South Texas.
- September 13–20 – Hurricane Humberto kills two people and caused over $25 million (2019 USD) in damage across the Bahamas, the East Coast of the United States, Puerto Rico, Bermuda, and Atlantic Canada.
- September 17–19 – Tropical Storm Imelda kills seven people and caused $5 billion (2019 USD) in damage across Texas, Louisiana, Oklahoma, and Arkansas. Tropical Storm Imelda was the fourth-wettest tropical cyclone on record in the U.S. state of Texas.
- September 22–27 – Tropical Storm Karen caused $3.53 million (2019 USD) in damage across the Windward Islands, Trinidad and Tobago, Venezuela, the US Virgin Islands, the British Virgin Islands, and Puerto Rico.
- September 23 – October 7 – Hurricane Lorenzo, also known as Storm Lorenzo, kills 20 people and caused $367 million (2019 USD) in damage across West Africa, Cape Verde, the Lesser Antilles, the Eastern United States, Azores, the British Isles, France, Germany, and Eastern Europe. Hurricane Lorenzo was the easternmost Category 5 Atlantic hurricane on record.
- September 25–28 – The 2019 Pune Flood kills 22 people and caused damage across Pune, India.
- September 27 – October 5 – Typhoon Mitag, also known as Typhoon Onyok, kills 17 people and caused $816 million (2019 USD) in damage across the Philippines, the Ryukyu Islands, Taiwan, East China (particularly Zhoushan), and South Korea.
- September 29 – October 1 – Tropical Storm Narda kills six people and caused $15.2 million (2019 USD) in damage across Western Mexico, the Baja California Peninsula, and the Southwestern United States.

=== October ===
- October 1–3 – A rare, record breaking October heatwave hits the Eastern US. Some places, like Tuscaloosa, Alabama and Meridian, Mississippi, soar above 100 °F (38 °C) for the first time in October. Several other locations in the Southeast tied or set monthly record highs on 3 consecutive days. Alabama, Florida, Mississippi, Delaware, Tennessee, Maryland and Washington DC break their monthly record high for October, which was also tied in New Jersey, New York and Kentucky. The hottest state was Alabama, which hit 105 °F (41 °C). The Northeast's cooldown was more abrupt than the Southeast, as by October 3, temperatures in LaGuardia Airport dropped from 95 °F (35 °C) (where the state monthly high was tied), down to 55 °F (13 °C). Raleigh saw their hottest temperature of the year and their latest in season temperatures above 100 °F (38 °C).
- October 4–22 – Typhoon Hagibis, known in Japan as Reiwa 1 East Japan Typhoon, kills 98 people with 7 missing and caused $15 billion (2019 USD) in damage across the Mariana Islands, Japan, Russia, Alaska. Typhoon Hagibis became the costliest Pacific typhoon in recorded history (when unadjusted for inflation), the strongest typhoon to strike mainland Japan in decades, the deadliest typhoon to strike Japan since 1979, and one of the largest typhoons ever recorded, with a peak gale-force diameter of 825 nautical miles.
- October 18–21 – Tropical Storm Nestor kills three people and caused $150 million (2019 USD) in damage across Central America, the Yucatan Peninsula, and the Southeastern United States.
- October 20–22 – A tornado outbreak in the South Central and Southeastern United States caused $2 billion (2019 USD) in damage from 36 tornadoes.
  - October 20 – An EF 3 tornado in Texas during the Tornado outbreak of October 20–22 caused $1.55 billion (2019 USD) in damage across its 15.76 mi (25.36 km) path, making this the costliest tornado event in Texas history.
- October 25–26 – According to Japan Meteorological Agency official confirmed report, a heavy massive rain, following flash flood hit in around Boso Peninsula, Chiba Prefecture, Japan, A Fire and Disaster Management Agency official confirmed report, 13 persons died and 13 persons were injured,
- October 25–27 – Tropical Storm Olga kills two people and caused $400 million (2019 USD) in damage across the Central United States and the Great Lakes region.
- October 25–29 – Hurricane Pablo caused damage across the British Isles, Portugal (Azores, Madeira), and France and became the farthest east-forming hurricane in the North Atlantic tropical cyclone basin on record.
- October 28 – November 11 – Tropical Storm Matmo and Cyclone Bulbul kill 43 people and caused a combined damage total of $3.54 billion (2019 USD) across Vietnam, Laos, Cambodia, Thailand, Myanmar, the Andaman and Nicobar Islands, Eastern India, and Bangladesh. Cyclone Bulbul is only the second storm to make landfall on Bangladesh as a Category 1 hurricane-equivalent cyclone, the first being another Cyclone in October 1960.

=== November ===
- November 4–11 – Typhoon Nakri kills six people and caused $35.6 million (2019 USD) in damage across the Philippines and Vietnam.
- November 12 – A tornado in South Africa kills two people and injured several more.
- November 24 – December 6 – Typhoon Kammuri, known in the Philippines as Typhoon Tisoy, kills 17 people and caused $116 million (2019 USD) in damage across the Caroline Islands, the Mariana Islands, and the Philippines.
- November 26–27 An EF2 tornado in Louisiana kills one person.
- November 26 – December 3 – A winter storm causes 8 deaths.

=== December ===
- December 2–14 – Cyclone Belna kills nine people and caused over $25 million (2019 USD) in damage across Seychelles, Mayotte, Comoros, and Madagascar.
- December 16–17 – A tornado outbreak across Louisiana, Mississippi, Alabama, Tennessee, Florida, and Georgia kills four people (3 tornadic and 1 non-tornadic) and injured more than 14 others from 40 tornadoes.
- December 18 - During an extreme heatwave, Australia recorded its hottest ever day, with the national average temperature reaching 41.9 °C (107.4 °F). This broke the record set only a day prior, when the average temperature reached 40.9 °C (105.6 °F).
- December 19–29 – Typhoon Phanfone, known in the Philippines as Typhoon Ursula kills 50 people with 55 missing and caused $67.2 million (2019 USD) in damage across the Caroline Islands and the Philippines.
- December 19 – A snow squall on Interstate 80 in Pennsylvania caused 2 deaths. The same snow squall forced Interstate 390 to close as well.
- December 23, 2019 – January 2, 2020 – Cyclone Sarai kills two people and caused $2.3 million (2019 USD) in damage across Tuvalu, Vanuatu, Fiji, Tonga, Niue, and the Cook Islands.

== See also ==
- Weather of 2020

Global weather by year
Preceded by 2018	Weather of 2019	Succeeded by 2020
