= Novostroyka (disambiguation) =

Novostroyka is a rural settlement in Leninsky District, Volgograd Oblast, Russia.

Novostroyka or Novostroika (Новостройка), a Russian word literally meaning "new construction site", may also refer to:

- Novostroyka, Kaliningrad Oblast
- Novostroyka, Kemerovsky District, Kemerovo Oblast
- Novostroyka, Pallasovsky District, Volgograd Oblast
- Novostroyka, Vytegorsky District, Vologda Oblast
- Novostroyka, former name for:
  - the village Qyzylkiya, Kazakhstan
  - Okha Airport, in Okha, Russia
  - a settlement incorporated into Peresvet, Russia
- Novostroïka, a short story by Maria Reva from The Best American Short Stories 2017 anthology
