= Tornado outbreak of April 17–19, 2019 =

Weather event in the southern United States of early 2019

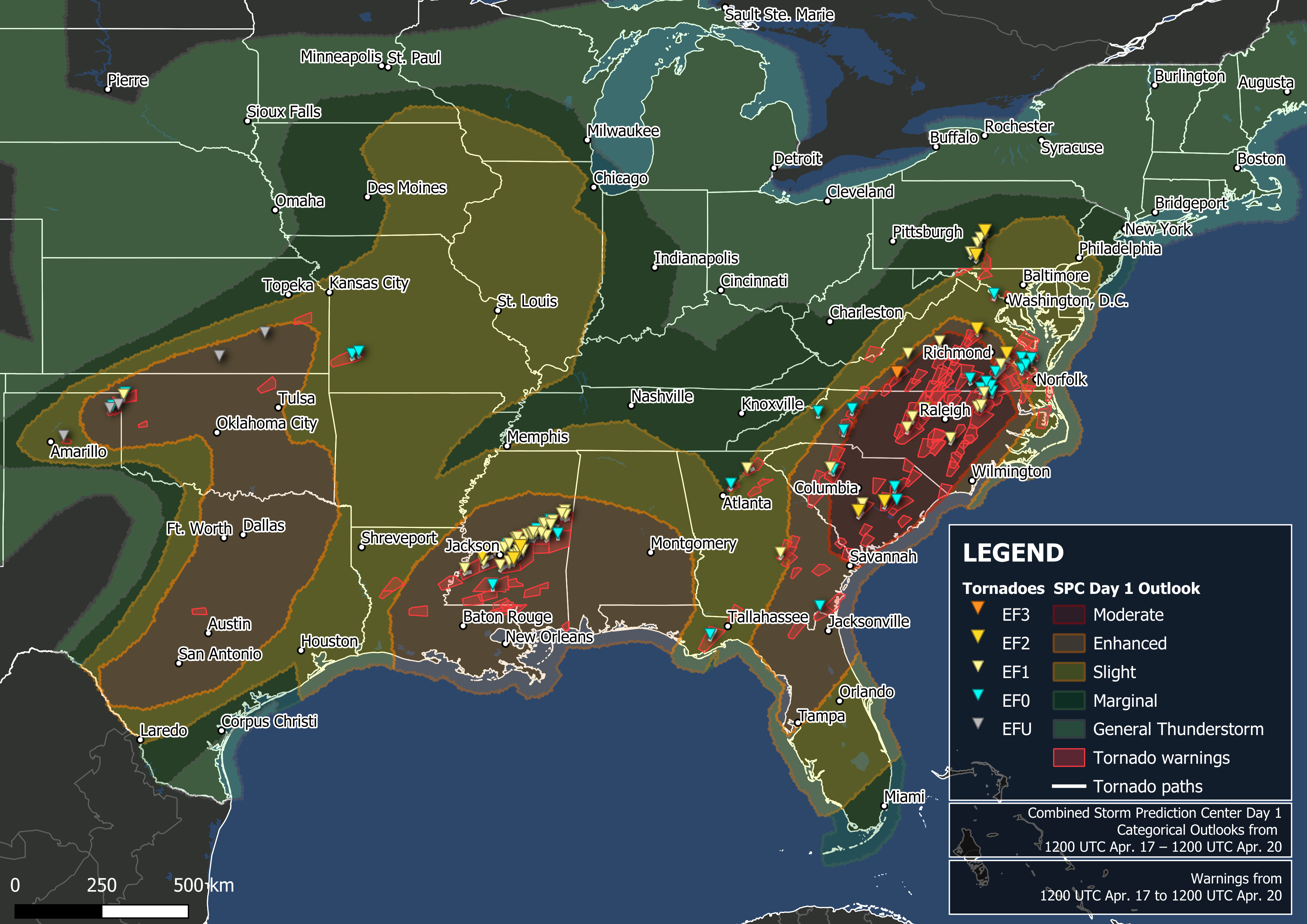
- Map of tornado warnings and confirmed tornadoes during the outbreak (from April 17–19)

Meteorological history
- Duration: April 17–19, 2019

Tornado outbreak
- Tornadoes: 97
- Max. rating: EF3 tornado
- Highest winds: Tornadic – 160 mph (260 km/h) in Henry Fork, Virginia EF3 on April 19; Straight-line – 90 mph (140 km/h) in Avon, North Carolina on April 19
- Largest hail: 3 in (7.6 cm) in Selman, Oklahoma on April 17

Overall effects
- Fatalities: 4 non-tornadic
- Injuries: 3
- Damage: >$26.25 million (2019 USD)
- Areas affected: South Central United States, Southeastern United States
- Part of the Tornadoes of 2019

From April 17–19, 2019, a multi-day, widespread tornado outbreak occurred stretching from the South-Central United States to the East Coast of the United States. On the heels of a significant tornado outbreak just a few days prior, another potent upper-level trough progressed eastward and served as the impetus for widespread, damaging thunderstorms. The outbreak began on April 17 with several short-lived, generally weak tornadoes across Kansas, Oklahoma, and Texas. The following day, a total of 43 tornadoes were recorded across central Mississippi, tying the Hurricane Rita tornado outbreak as the largest in Mississippi state history. On April 19, the event spread eastward. North Carolina recorded 12 tornadoes, the state's sixth largest outbreak in a single day, while Virginia recorded 16 tornadoes, its third-most in a 24-hour period. Overall, 97 tornadoes were confirmed, the strongest of which was a high-end EF3 tornado that heavily damaged or destroyed homes and outbuildings near Rocky Mount, Virginia. There were no fatalities recorded in association with tornadic activity, but four people were killed by trees that were downed by strong straight-line winds.

== Meteorological synopsis ==
=== April 17 ===
On April 13, the Storm Prediction Center (SPC) outlined a broad swath of the Central United States for the potential for severe thunderstorms four days later. The general threat area was further expanded on April 14, and a heightened risk was introduced from eastern Texas northward into Iowa, indicative of higher confidence of a severe weather outbreak. The next day, a day 3 Enhanced risk was introduced across portions of North Texas, southeastern Oklahoma, and southwestern Arkansas, where supercell thunderstorms capable of producing very large hail were expected. This threat level was maintained going into the event. As a shortwave trough moved into the Central Plains on the afternoon of April 17, strong forcing helped to eliminate the cap across the region. An unstable atmosphere, characterized by mid-level Convective Available Potential Energy (CAPE) values of 1,500–2,500 J/kg, strong wind shear, and very steep mid-level lapse rates of 8.5–9 C/km, led to the formation of discrete supercell thunderstorms along a stationary front across the Texas and Oklahoma panhandles, as well as southern Kansas. Sporadic large hail and landspout tornado reports were received before the storms congealed into a line, transitioning the main severe threat to damaging wind gusts. Less concentrated activity occurred throughout the region, including a thunderstorm that produced five consecutive minutes of winds above 58 mph (93 km/h), and a peak gust of 74 mph (119 km/h), in Denton, Texas.

=== April 18 ===
As the SPC introduced a day 5 threat area across the Central United States valid on April 17, the organization also outlined a large day 6 region across portions of the Midwestern states, Mississippi Valley, and Appalachia. A day 3 Slight risk was originally introduced from the central Gulf Coast north into southern Illinois, but a rare mid-afternoon update outlined an Enhanced risk across eastern Louisiana into southern Mississippi. It was later expanded eastward to encompass much of Alabama as well as the Florida Panhandle. In their 16:30 UTC update on April 18, the SPC contemplated upgrading portions of the risk area to a Moderate risk (driven by the chance for tornadoes), but ultimately deferred due to questions surrounding the characteristic of expected storms. As the aforementioned, well-defined shortwave trough progressed eastward into the lower Mississippi Valley, a mesoscale convective vortex organized over west-central Mississippi. Embedded circulations and semi-discrete supercell structures within this complex led to 44 confirmed tornadoes, the strongest of which caused high-end EF2 damage in Morton, Mississippi. This ties the Hurricane Rita tornado outbreak as the largest outbreak in Mississippi state history. As the squall line tracked east, numerous reports of damaging wind gusts were received across the Southeast United States.

=== April 19 ===
The first indications for organized severe weather on April 19 came six days prior, when the SPC introduced a day 7 threat area from Maryland southward into southern Florida. This outlook was maintained over subsequent days, transitioning to a day 3 Enhanced risk across portions of northeastern South Carolina, eastern North Carolina, and southeastern Virginia on April 17. The next day, the highest risk area was extended southward into Georgia and Florida. By the morning of April 19, a Moderate risk was introduced, stretching from eastern South Carolina into south-central Virginia. Along the leading edge of strong forcing, a severe squall line developed across central Florida northward into southern Virginia, leading to hundreds of damaging wind reports throughout the region. Ahead of this line, multiple long-lived supercells tracked across the Carolinas and into southern Virginia, with others developing as far north as Pennsylvania. Several strong tornadoes touched down within this corridor, where mid-level CAPE reached 1,000 J/kg and low-level wind shear profiles became conducive for tornadoes. Overall, 12 tornadoes touched down in North Carolina, the state's sixth largest outbreak on record in a single day. Meanwhile, 16 tornadoes were confirmed in Virginia, the state's third largest outbreak in a 24-hour period, surpassed only by the Hurricane Ivan tornado outbreak and the 1993 Virginia tornado outbreak. Into the evening, a loss of daytime heating led to a diminishing of the severe weather potential as thunderstorms shifted eastward into the Atlantic Ocean.

== Confirmed tornadoes ==
Confirmed tornadoes by Enhanced Fujita rating
EFU	EF0	EF1	EF2	EF3	EF4	EF5	Total
5	31	49	11	1	0	0	97

=== April 17 event ===
List of confirmed tornadoes – Wednesday, April 17, 2019 (Note: All dates are based on the local time zone where the tornado touched down; however, all times are in Coordinated Universal Time for consistency.)
EF#	Location	County / Parish	State	Start Coord.	Time (UTC)	Path length	Max width
EFU	SW of Glazier to NNE of Canadian	Hemphill	TX	35.966°N 100.2968°W	20:39–20:54	2.43 mi (3.91 km)	30 yd (27 m)
EFU	There were multiple reports of a tornado touchdown. No damage occurred.						
EF0	NE of Glazier	Hemphill, Lipscomb	TX	36.0342°N 100.2277°W	20:54–21:21	4.13 mi (6.65 km)	40 yd (37 m)
EF0	A rope tornado snapped some tree limbs.						
EFU	SW of Higgins	Lipscomb	TX	36.0659°N 100.0741°W	21:29–21:32	1.06 mi (1.71 km)	30 yd (27 m)
EFU	Broadcast media and storm spotters reported touchdown near Higgins. No damage occurred.						
EF1	NW of Shattuck	Ellis	OK	36.314°N 99.942°W	21:47–21:53	1.6 mi (2.6 km)	50 yd (46 m)
EF1	Sheds, trees, and fences were damaged at two homes northwest of Shattuck.						
EF0	N of Shattuck	Ellis	OK	36.37°N 99.9°W	21:49–22:03	1.31 mi (2.11 km)	10 yd (9.1 m)
EF0	This tornado was the second ongoing in Ellis County. Only minor tree damage occurred.						
EFU	NE of Washburn	Carson	TX	35.2471°N 101.4959°W	22:05–22:19	1.97 mi (3.17 km)	20 yd (18 m)
EFU	A landspout was reported by broadcast media and Rick Husband International Airport. No damage occurred.						
EFU	NW of Wellington	Sumner	KS	37.32°N 97.46°W	23:38–23:42	1.11 mi (1.79 km)	30 yd (27 m)
EFU	A weak landspout tornado remained over open country, causing no damage.						
EFU	N of Eureka	Greenwood	KS	37.93°N 96.28°W	00:50-00:51	0.1 mi (0.16 km)	30 yd (27 m)
EFU	A brief landspout tornado remained over open country, causing no damage.						
EF0	W of Lockwood	Dade	MO	37.3766°N 94.0208°W	05:50–05:52	1.97 mi (3.17 km)	50 yd (46 m)
EF0	Trees, outbuildings, and an irrigation system were damaged.						

=== April 18 event ===
List of confirmed tornadoes – Thursday, April 18, 2019
EF#	Location	County / Parish	State	Start Coord.	Time (UTC)	Path length	Max width
EF0	N of Greenfield	Dade	MO	37.4378°N 93.8466°W	06:00–06:01	1.04 mi (1.67 km)	200 yd (180 m)
EF0	Trees and outdoor objects were damaged.						
EF1	NNW of Fayette to SSE of Port Gibson	Jefferson, Claiborne	MS	31.8086°N 91.1004°W	18:13–18:25	8.44 mi (13.58 km)	1,100 yd (1,000 m)
EF1	Embedded within a larger area of straight-line winds, this tornado downed hundreds of trees and caused minor roof damage to several homes.						
EF1	SE of Utica	Copiah	MS	31.9864°N 90.6119°W	18:58–19:09	6.57 mi (10.57 km)	500 yd (460 m)
EF1	Numerous trees were snapped or uprooted.						
EF2	NW of Utica to ENE of Learned	Hinds	MS	32.1237°N 90.6506°W	18:59–19:13	11.03 mi (17.75 km)	1,320 yd (1,210 m)
EF2	At its peak intensity, this large tornado snapped or uprooted a large swath of trees. Elsewhere, some homes sustained minor roof damage or were impacted by falling trees.						
EF2	SW of Learned to ESE of Raymond	Hinds	MS	32.1769°N 90.6036°W	19:06–19:27	12.77 mi (20.55 km)	1,320 yd (1,210 m)
EF2	This large tornado snapped and uprooted countless trees along its path, and snapped several utility poles as well.						
EF0	ESE of Bogue Chitto	Lincoln	MS	31.3914°N 90.3756°W	19:35–19:36	0.64 mi (1.03 km)	200 yd (180 m)
EF0	Several trees were damaged, including one that fell on a barn.						
EF1	NNW of Georgetown to NNW of Puckett	Copiah, Simpson, Rankin	MS	31.8964°N 90.178°W	19:35–20:10	28.36 mi (45.64 km)	600 yd (550 m)
EF1	A long-tracked tornado significantly damaged a mobile home, leaving one partial interior wall and the floor. A second mobile home had its rear exterior wall ripped out. Numerous trees were snapped and uprooted, some of which fell on homes and vehicles. A large metal building was completely destroyed, a couple of barns and sheds lost portions of their roofs, and a couple of power poles were uprooted, with power lines downed.						
EF1	ESE of Clinton to W of Jackson	Hinds	MS	32.3266°N 90.3067°W	19:41–19:46	2.32 mi (3.73 km)	150 yd (140 m)
EF1	At the Clinton Walmart, the garden center and a fence were damaged, and two vehicles were blown over. Trees were downed around apartment complexes to the east before the tornado lifted.						
EF1	NW of Pearl to N of Flowood	Rankin	MS	32.2973°N 90.1294°W	19:51–19:56	3.13 mi (5.04 km)	50 yd (46 m)
EF1	Many trees were either snapped or uprooted, and large tree limbs were snapped off.						
EF1	E of Braxton	Simpson, Rankin	MS	31.9989°N 89.9468°W	19:54–20:03	11.31 mi (18.20 km)	400 yd (370 m)
EF1	Numerous trees were snapped and uprooted.						
EF2	W of Puckett	Simpson, Rankin	MS	32.0357°N 89.8333°W	20:01–20:11	9.38 mi (15.10 km)	600 yd (550 m)
EF2	This large multiple-vortex tornado downed massive swaths of trees along its path, as well as some power poles and lines. At a few points, there were varying degrees of intensity within the tornado itself, indicating multiple vortices were present inside it.						
EF1	NE of Flowood	Rankin	MS	32.3625°N 90.0644°W	20:07–20:10	1.12 mi (1.80 km)	50 yd (46 m)
EF1	Many trees were either snapped or uprooted, and large tree limbs were snapped off. Power lines were downed as well.						
EF1	NW of Puckett to WSW of Polkville	Rankin	MS	32.1642°N 89.8086°W	20:13–20:18	4.49 mi (7.23 km)	1,100 yd (1,000 m)
EF1	Numerous trees and power lines were downed by this large tornado. Several chicken houses and a barn were heavily damaged.						
EF0	E of Madison	Rankin	MS	32.4341°N 90.0004°W	20:15–20:18	1.6 mi (2.6 km)	540 yd (490 m)
EF0	Trees were snapped and uprooted.						
EF1	Polkville	Smith	MS	32.1865°N 89.7211°W	20:19–20:24	3.47 mi (5.58 km)	950 yd (870 m)
EF1	Hundreds of trees and many power lines were downed. Multiple homes suffered either minor damage from tornadic winds or more substantial damage from fallen trees.						
EF0	N of Polkville	Smith, Scott	MS	32.2060°N 89.7122°W	20:20–20:23	2.38 mi (3.83 km)	50 yd (46 m)
EF0	This weak tornado moved northeast, snapping small trees and branches.						
EF1	E of Madison	Rankin	MS	32.4542°N 89.9442°W	20:22–20:29	4.83 mi (7.77 km)	150 yd (140 m)
EF1	A tornado occurred in a heavily forested area, snapping and uprooting trees.						
EF1	N of Polkville to S of Morton	Scott	MS	32.2763°N 89.7015°W	20:24–20:26	2.57 mi (4.14 km)	150 yd (140 m)
EF1	Numerous hardwood trees were either snapped or uprooted, and power lines and poles were knocked down.						
EF1	SE of Morton	Scott	MS	32.2871°N 89.5893°W	20:24–20:26	1.41 mi (2.27 km)	200 yd (180 m)
EF1	Several trees were uprooted and a few were snapped.						
EF2	Morton to WNW of Forest	Scott	MS	32.3556°N 89.6523°W	20:31–20:43	6.02 mi (9.69 km)	560 yd (510 m)
EF2	A high-end EF2 tornado touched down in Morton, where numerous large trees were snapped or uprooted and multiple homes had their roofs torn off. One home sustained collapse of several exterior walls, and several others sustained minor to moderate roof damage. Trees and tree limbs were downed farther along the path before the tornado dissipated.						
EF1	N of Ludlow	Scott, Leake	MS	32.5883°N 89.779°W	20:40–20:59	11.35 mi (18.27 km)	1,320 yd (1,210 m)
EF1	Numerous trees were snapped and uprooted by this large tornado.						
EF1	S of Lena	Scott	MS	32.5708°N 89.7491°W	20:42–20:59	10.3 mi (16.6 km)	900 yd (820 m)
EF1	Several mobile homes suffered minor roof damage. A gas station had a large section of its roof removed. Sheet metal was peeled back on several barns and chicken houses. Numerous trees were snapped and uprooted.						
EF1	NW of Harperville	Scott, Leake	MS	32.504°N 89.5856°W	20:45–21:05	11.04 mi (17.77 km)	1,760 yd (1,610 m)
EF1	A very large but weak tornado peeled off tin metal from a barn and old chicken houses, and it also snapped and uprooted numerous trees. One home suffered minor damage from a fallen tree limb.						
EF1	N of Lena	Leake	MS	32.621°N 89.7297°W	20:46–21:00	10.34 mi (16.64 km)	1,000 yd (910 m)
EF1	Numerous trees were snapped and uprooted, some of which fell on a power pole and caused minor roof damage to a house.						
EF1	N of Standing Pine	Leake, Neshoba	MS	32.6963°N 89.4811°W	21:04–21:15	9.9 mi (15.9 km)	1,600 yd (1,500 m)
EF1	Widespread tree damage occurred as a result of this large tornado.						
EF1	NE of Standing Pine	Leake	MS	32.704°N 89.3982°W	21:19–21:21	2.1 mi (3.4 km)	300 yd (270 m)
EF1	Many trees were snapped and uprooted, a few sheds and barns suffered minor damage, and several power lines and power poles were downed.						
EF1	ENE of Standing Pine to SSW of Pearl River	Leake, Neshoba	MS	32.7014°N 89.3675°W	21:20–21:25	5.96 mi (9.59 km)	350 yd (320 m)
EF1	Many trees were snapped and uprooted, and some power lines were downed.						
EF1	WSW of Pearl River	Leake, Neshoba	MS	32.757°N 89.3222°W	21:22–21:24	0.6 mi (0.97 km)	75 yd (69 m)
EF1	Numerous trees were snapped and uprooted.						
EF1	E of Tucker	Neshoba	MS	32.6641°N 88.9835°W	21:23–21:35	8.82 mi (14.19 km)	1,400 yd (1,300 m)
EF1	Portions of tin roofing was peeled from two barns as a result of this large tornado. Numerous trees were snapped or uprooted.						
EF1	SW of Pearl River	Leake, Neshoba	MS	32.7157°N 89.3235°W	21:25–21:27	1.71 mi (2.75 km)	180 yd (160 m)
EF1	Numerous trees were snapped and uprooted.						
EF1	S of Pearl River	Neshoba	MS	32.7618°N 89.2596°W	21:30–21:32	1.95 mi (3.14 km)	250 yd (230 m)
EF1	One home sustained moderate shingle and roof damage. Otherwise, trees were snapped.						
EF0	N of Pearl River	Neshoba	MS	32.8401°N 89.2335°W	21:34–21:49	11.22 mi (18.06 km)	1,000 yd (910 m)
EF0	A wide swath of trees were damaged.						
EF0	SW of De Kalb	Kemper	MS	32.7156°N 88.6833°W	21:37–21:43	3.34 mi (5.38 km)	300 yd (270 m)
EF0	The aluminum roofing to a one-story home was peeled back and thrown several hundred yards into a field. Numerous trees were snapped or uprooted.						
EF1	Philadelphia	Neshoba	MS	32.759°N 89.1158°W	21:40–21:44	1.91 mi (3.07 km)	880 yd (800 m)
EF1	Numerous trees were snapped or uprooted, some of which fell on homes and caused structural damage. A church and a nearby building sustained roof damage, and an exterior wall was collapsed outward at an urgent care.						
EF1	Southeastern Philadelphia	Neshoba	MS	32.7459°N 89.1068°W	21:40–21:46	3.15 mi (5.07 km)	700 yd (640 m)
EF1	Numerous trees were snapped or uprooted, some of which fell on homes.						
EF1	SSE of Noxapater	Winston	MS	32.9348°N 89.0548°W	21:50–21:51	1.34 mi (2.16 km)	100 yd (91 m)
EF1	Numerous trees were snapped or uprooted.						
EF1	E of Noxapater	Winston	MS	32.9826°N 89.0396°W	21:54–22:05	9.89 mi (15.92 km)	1,000 yd (910 m)
EF1	Numerous trees were snapped or uprooted.						
EF0	E of Noxapater	Winston	MS	32.9936°N 88.9936°W	21:57–22:06	6.23 mi (10.03 km)	800 yd (730 m)
EF0	Numerous trees were snapped or uprooted.						
EF1	E of Noxapater	Winston	MS	32.9486°N 88.8694°W	22:04–22:07	2.97 mi (4.78 km)	100 yd (91 m)
EF1	Numerous trees were snapped or uprooted.						
EF0	ESE of Louisville	Winston	MS	33.0692°N 88.8821°W	22:08–22:09	1.36 mi (2.19 km)	50 yd (46 m)
EF0	Several trees were uprooted.						
EF1	ESE of Louisville	Winston, Noxubee	MS	33.0524°N 88.8155°W	22:13–22:21	7 mi (11 km)	700 yd (640 m)
EF1	Several trees were uprooted.						
EF1	E of Brooksville	Noxubee	MS	33.2039°N 88.4856°W	22:29–22:32	2.03 mi (3.27 km)	500 yd (460 m)
EF1	The tin roof of a church was partially removed, an irrigation pivot was partially flipped, multiple homes suffered roof damage, and trees were damaged too.						
EF1	Brooksville	Noxubee	MS	33.2383°N 88.5839°W	22:38–22:49	9.63 mi (15.50 km)	600 yd (550 m)
EF1	A high-end EF1 tornado struck Brooksville, producing considerable damage to structures at its peak. Other homes suffered more minor roof damage. Several utility poles were downed and trees were damaged.						
EF1	ENE of Crawford	Lowndes	MS	33.3167°N 88.5026°W	22:42–22:47	3.12 mi (5.02 km)	150 yd (140 m)
EF1	A large empty grain bin was slid off its base and bent inward, the roof of a large metal building was partially removed, and a few trees were uprooted.						

=== April 19 event ===
List of confirmed tornadoes – Friday, April 19, 2019
EF#	Location	County / Parish	State	Start Coord.	Time (UTC)	Path length	Max width
EF0	SW of Johns Creek	Fulton	GA	34.0078°N 84.2014°W	09:07–09:08	0.57 mi (0.92 km)	150 yd (140 m)
EF0	Trees and tree limbs were snapped, and several power poles were downed.						
EF1	S of Clermont	Hall	GA	34.4099°N 83.7783°W	09:50–09:53	2.36 mi (3.80 km)	300 yd (270 m)
EF1	Trees were snapped and uprooted while a steeple at a church was blown over.						
EF0	S of Telogia to S of Quincy	Liberty, Wakulla, Leon	FL	30.1053°N 84.7368°W	12:26–12:44	18.12 mi (29.16 km)	150 yd (140 m)
EF0	A weak tornado began in the Apalachicola National Forest and moved northeast, causing solely tree damage.						
EF3	N of Oak Level to E of Henry Fork	Franklin	VA	36.8564°N 79.8906°W	14:25–14:37	8.11 mi (13.05 km)	250 yd (230 m)
EF3	This intense tornado caused significant damage to the south of Rocky Mount. A well-built brick home sustained total loss of its roof and exterior walls. A modular home was left with only a few walls standing, and 10 outbuildings were damaged or destroyed. Vehicles and large metal storage tanks were thrown considerable distances. Numerous trees were snapped or uprooted, and metal light poles were bent to the ground at a baseball field in the Sontag community. Two people were injured.						
EF0	Ashford	McDowell	NC	35.88°N 81.94°W	14:27–14:28	0.43 mi (0.69 km)	50 yd (46 m)
EF0	An inn lost some shingles, a mobile home had its metal skirting damaged, and some small outbuildings were damaged in the small community of Ashford. Some trees were also uprooted.						
EF1	N of Thaxton	Bedford	VA	37.3858°N 79.6085°W	15:22–15:25	2.22 mi (3.57 km)	60 yd (55 m)
EF1	An outbuilding was destroyed and trees were snapped or uprooted.						
EF1	N of McRae	Laurens	GA	32.2167°N 82.9119°W	15:25–15:30	4.45 mi (7.16 km)	200 yd (180 m)
EF1	A metal roof at a one-story home was partially lifted and thrown. The majority of damage was snapped or uprooted trees, some of which took down power lines.						
EF0	NNW of Kings Ferry, FL	Camden	GA	30.8371°N 81.8934°W	16:05–16:06	0.43 mi (0.69 km)	10 yd (9.1 m)
EF0	Several pine trees were snapped by this brief tornado.						
EF2	S of Rowesville	Orangeburg	SC	33.2693°N 80.8933°W	17:48–17:56	10.6 mi (17.1 km)	300 yd (270 m)
EF2	A strong tornado snapped or uprooted a large number of trees, some of which fell on homes, vehicles, and sheds. A metal shed was completely destroyed, with its debris spread over a 100 yd (91 m) area.						
EF1	E of Orangeburg	Orangeburg, Calhoun	SC	33.4939°N 80.7892°W	18:01–18:09	7.82 mi (12.59 km)	400 yd (370 m)
EF1	Numerous trees were snapped and uprooted, and two mobile homes were destroyed by fallen trees. A cinder block garage had its walls collapsed and metal roof thrown across a road. A center pivot irrigation system was overturned.						
EF1	S of Whitmire	Newberry	SC	34.4278°N 81.6193°W	18:07–18:09	1.89 mi (3.04 km)	200 yd (180 m)
EF1	A large two-story chicken house was completely destroyed, a small outbuilding suffered damage to its metal roof and siding, and a small shed was moved 2 ft (0.61 m) off its foundation. The underpinning of a mobile home was damaged. Numerous trees were snapped or uprooted as well.						
EF0	NNE of Newberry	Newberry	SC	34.3812°N 81.5456°W	18:08–18:09	0.33 mi (0.53 km)	25 yd (23 m)
EF0	Several trees were snapped.						
EF2	SE of Summerton	Clarendon	SC	33.5238°N 80.2198°W	18:29–18:33	2.91 mi (4.68 km)	250 yd (230 m)
EF2	At a campsite, two docks, a cabin, and multiple trees were damaged. Some of those trees fell on homes, vehicles, and boats. The strong tornado continued northeast, completely destroying one mobile home and significantly damaging others. Additional houses suffered minor damage before the tornado lifted.						
EF0	SW of Salters	Williamsburg	SC	33.59°N 79.9°W	19:00–19:01	0.25 mi (0.40 km)	15 yd (14 m)
EF0	Small tree limbs and other debris were blown around.						
EF0	W of Olanta	Florence	SC	33.9314°N 79.9557°W	19:00–19:02	0.55 mi (0.89 km)	30 yd (27 m)
EF0	A home sustained minor damage, a large roof was lifted off an outbuilding and shed, and several trees were uprooted.						
EF1	Robbins	Moore	NC	35.4679°N 79.6342°W	19:11–19:14	1.6 mi (2.6 km)	300 yd (270 m)
EF1	Numerous trees were snapped and uprooted in Robbins, and several homes suffered roof damage from fallen trees.						
EF0	Lincolnton	Gaston, Lincoln	NC	35.399°N 81.282°W	19:29–19:39	7.11 mi (11.44 km)	100 yd (91 m)
EF0	Trees were snapped or uprooted in and around Lincolnton. One tree fell on a home, injuring the occupant.						
EF1	Siler City	Chatham	NC	35.7420°N 79.4912°W	19:35–19:38	1.92 mi (3.09 km)	150 yd (140 m)
EF1	Numerous trees were snapped and uprooted. Power poles and power lines were downed, and the roofs of several homes in town were damaged.						
EF2	W of Chapel Hill to Southern Hillsborough	Orange	NC	35.9187°N 79.188°W	20:00–20:15	10.1 mi (16.3 km)	600 yd (550 m)
EF2	A strong tornado snapped and split large, healthy trees along its path. Some of these trees landed on homes and vehicles. Several homes in the southern part of Hillsborough received considerable damage, including one home that had its roof and several of its exterior walls completely destroyed.						
EF0	N of Hiddenite	Alexander	NC	35.949°N 81.059°W	20:10–20:11	0.53 mi (0.85 km)	75 yd (69 m)
EF0	Part of a metal roof was ripped off a barn and lofted some distance. Trees were damaged too.						
EF1	Spivey's Corner to S of Four Oaks	Sampson, Johnston	NC	35.1913°N 78.5071°W	21:01–21:11	10.15 mi (16.33 km)	125 yd (114 m)
EF1	Power poles and power lines were downed, outdoor furniture was tossed, and at least one home suffered minor damage to its roof in Sampson County. The tornado remained on the ground intermittently into Johnston County, where it caused considerable roof and window damage to two homes and blew over several grain silos. Numerous trees were snapped and uprooted along the entirety of the path.						
EF1	Shipman	Nelson	VA	37.699°N 78.789°W	21:31–21:33	1.52 mi (2.45 km)	125 yd (114 m)
EF1	Numerous trees were snapped or uprooted, one of which fell and killed a horse, and a second of which damaged three vehicles. A recreational vehicle was blown over, several small outbuildings and sheds were destroyed, and power lines were severed.						
EF1	E of Dortches to WSW of Enfield	Nash, Halifax	NC	36.003°N 77.8058°W	22:08–22:19	11.74 mi (18.89 km)	350 yd (320 m)
EF1	This tornado damaged several outbuildings and ripped off a considerable amount of roofing from one home. It also snapped and uprooted many trees.						
EF1	S of Whitakers to E of Enfield	Edgecombe, Halifax	NC	36.0435°N 77.7097°W	22:16–22:25	10.6 mi (17.1 km)	75 yd (69 m)
EF1	This tornado completely destroyed a single-wide mobile home, lofting its remnants for hundreds of yards down the tornado's path. Several other mobile homes nearby only sustained minor damage. Some farm outbuildings were also damaged, but otherwise this tornado mostly snapped and uprooted trees.						
EF1	South Weldon, NC to E of Emporia, VA	Halifax (NC), Northampton (NC), Greensville (VA), Southampton (VA)	NC, VA	36.3707°N 77.6371°W	22:34–00:00	24.55 mi (39.51 km)	100 yd (91 m)
EF1	Several structures in South Weldon sustained minor damage to their roofs and siding as a result of this long-tracked tornado. Many trees were snapped and uprooted along the remainder of the tornado's path.						
EF0	W of Gaston	Northampton	NC	36.49°N 77.72°W	22:39–22:40	1.5 mi (2.4 km)	50 yd (46 m)
EF0	Trees were snapped and uprooted.						
EF0	N of Jackson	Northampton	NC	36.4°N 77.43°W	22:44–22:54	9.75 mi (15.69 km)	100 yd (91 m)
EF0	Trees were snapped and uprooted along the path.						
EF0	E of Skippers	Greensville	VA	36.55°N 77.46°W	22:48–22:54	6.35 mi (10.22 km)	50 yd (46 m)
EF0	Trees were snapped along the path.						
EF0	NE of Brodnax	Brunswick	VA	36.7367°N 77.9989°W	22:50–22:51	0.6 mi (0.97 km)	200 yd (180 m)
EF0	This tornado uprooted or snapped trees along its path. One tree fell on a horse, killing it.						
EF0	Emporia	Greensville	VA	36.65°N 77.58°W	22:56–23:01	4.4 mi (7.1 km)	100 yd (91 m)
EF0	A couple of outbuildings were damaged, and trees were snapped. A shopping center in town sustained minor damage.						
EF1	Knobsville	Fulton	PA	40.0059°N 77.9857°W	23:06–23:08	1.5 mi (2.4 km)	75 yd (69 m)
EF1	Trees were snapped and uprooted, and a home lost both its chimney and a porch roof.						
EF2	St. Thomas	Franklin	PA	39.9039°N 77.8474°W	23:10–23:12	2.89 mi (4.65 km)	75 yd (69 m)
EF2	Commercial buildings suffered significant damage, several power poles were snapped, and numerous trees were snapped or uprooted. Several residential homes and garages were damaged as well.						
EF0	E of Stony Creek to E of Disputanta	Sussex, Prince George	VA	36.91°N 77.34°W	23:18–23:30	17.7 mi (28.5 km)	100 yd (91 m)
EF0	Trees were snapped and uprooted, with one falling on a garage and destroying it.						
EF1	Richvale	Huntingdon	PA	40.2532°N 77.8103°W	23:28–23:35	5.37 mi (8.64 km)	350 yd (320 m)
EF1	Sporadic damage to barns and the roofs of homes occurred. One barn was completely destroyed at high-end EF1 intensity. Trees were snapped or uprooted as well.						
EF1	Disputanta	Prince George	VA	37.11°N 77.2°W	23:31–23:41	8.3 mi (13.4 km)	200 yd (180 m)
EF1	Numerous sheds and outbuildings were significantly damaged or destroyed. Many trees were snapped or uprooted, and a carport was blown over.						
EF1	Krause	Juniata	PA	40.383°N 77.7255°W	23:39–23:41	1.25 mi (2.01 km)	350 yd (320 m)
EF1	The roof of one home and one barn sustained damage. Numerous trees were snapped and uprooted.						
EF2	NE of Charles City	Charles City	VA	37.36°N 77.05°W	23:46–23:52	3.1 mi (5.0 km)	200 yd (180 m)
EF2	The roof of a rod and gun club was lifted and partially blown off, with the south-facing exterior wall blown in. Extensive tree damage was observed, with numerous trees snapped or uprooted.						
EF0	NW of Smithfield	Isle of Wight	VA	36.99°N 76.66°W	23:56–23:58	2.9 mi (4.7 km)	100 yd (91 m)
EF0	Numerous trees were snapped or uprooted, one of which fell on a house.						
EF2	Lewistown	Mifflin	PA	40.5313°N 77.6139°W	23:57–00:05	4.9 mi (7.9 km)	200 yd (180 m)
EF2	Several hundred trees were snapped or uprooted, with several trailers were destroyed by fallen trees. Another trailer was flipped, and the roof of a fire station in Lewistown was partially removed.						
EF0	NE of Williamsburg	York	VA	37.28°N 76.67°W	00:05–00:06	1.8 mi (2.9 km)	150 yd (140 m)
EF0	Trees, power lines, and some homes were damaged.						
EF2	ENE of Mineral	Louisa	VA	37.99°N 77.82°W	00:06–00:08	2 mi (3.2 km)	300 yd (270 m)
EF2	This tornado removed the roof of a two-story home, and snapped numerous trees on the property. Another home's garage also sustained damage, and a tree was blown over onto a car.						
EF0	Newport News	Newport News (C)	VA	37.10°N 76.55°W	00:07–00:08	1.8 mi (2.9 km)	100 yd (91 m)
EF0	This tornado likely began as a waterspout over the Warwick River. Upon moving ashore, it produced mainly tree damage, though it did also destroy a small storage shed.						
EF0	Maryus	Gloucester	VA	37.26°N 76.41°W	00:20–00:22	1.4 mi (2.3 km)	100 yd (91 m)
EF0	This tornado likely began as a waterspout over the York River. It moved ashore, flattening a shed and damaging trees.						
EF0	Reston	Fairfax	VA	38.9302°N 77.3783°W	00:55–01:00	4.12 mi (6.63 km)	100 yd (91 m)
EF0	Trees were snapped or uprooted, some fencing was blown over, and shingles were blown off several townhouses in Reston. An outdoor shed was destroyed. Fallen trees caused significant damage to one townhouse, one home, and the front end of an unoccupied vehicle.						

== See also ==
- Weather of 2019
- List of North American tornadoes and tornado outbreaks
- List of United States tornadoes in April 2019
