= Typhoon Francisco (2019) =

Pacific typhoon in 2019

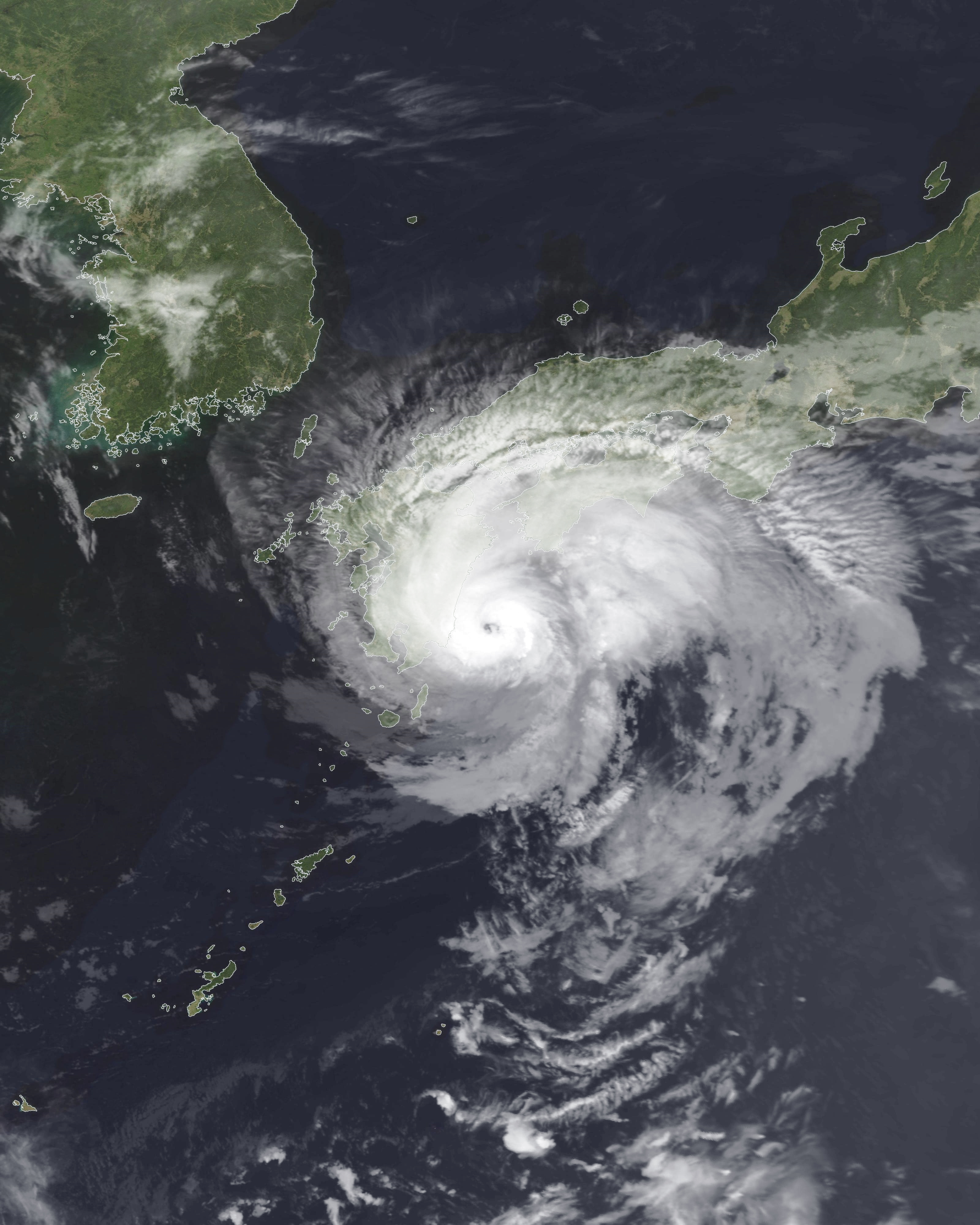
- Typhoon Francisco shortly before landfall in Kyushu on August 5

Meteorological history
- Formed: August 1, 2019
- Extratropical: August 8, 2019
- Dissipated: August 11, 2019

Typhoon
- 10-minute sustained (JMA)
- Highest winds: 130 km/h (80 mph)
- Lowest pressure: 970 hPa (mbar); 28.64 inHg

Category 1-equivalent typhoon
- 1-minute sustained (SSHWS)
- Highest winds: 150 km/h (90 mph)
- Lowest pressure: 966 hPa (mbar); 28.53 inHg

Overall effects
- Fatalities: 1 direct, 1 indirect
- Areas affected: Japan, Korean Peninsula, Russian Far East
- IBTrACS
- Part of the 2019 Pacific typhoon season

Typhoon Francisco (Note: The name Francisco (Chamorro: Francisco, [fɾænsisko]) was contributed by the United States and is a masculine given name in Chamorro.) was a compact tropical cyclone that impacted Japan and the Korean Peninsula in early August 2019. Originating from a trough over the open Pacific Ocean on July 29, Francisco developed into a tropical depression on August 1. Tracking along a northwest course toward Japan, the system steadily intensified over the following days. It attained typhoon strength on August 5 and soon struck Kyushu at peak strength with winds of 130 km/h (80 mph). Thereafter, the weakened storm traversed the Korea Strait before striking South Korea on August 6. Turning toward the east, Francisco transitioned into an extratropical cyclone on August 7. It later impacted Hokkaido before continuing across the northern Pacific and dissipating.

In anticipation of Francisco impacting Japan, officials in Kyushu ordered evacuations for coastal residents in and around Miyazaki. Transportation across the region was disrupted, with flights and train service cancelled. The storm brought locally damaging winds and heavy rain. Wind gusts up to 143 km/h (89 mph) downed trees and power lines, leaving 24,710 households without power. Two people died and four others were injured in incidents related to the storm. Francisco also had minor impacts in the Korean Peninsula and Russia's Primorsky Krai.

== Meteorological history ==
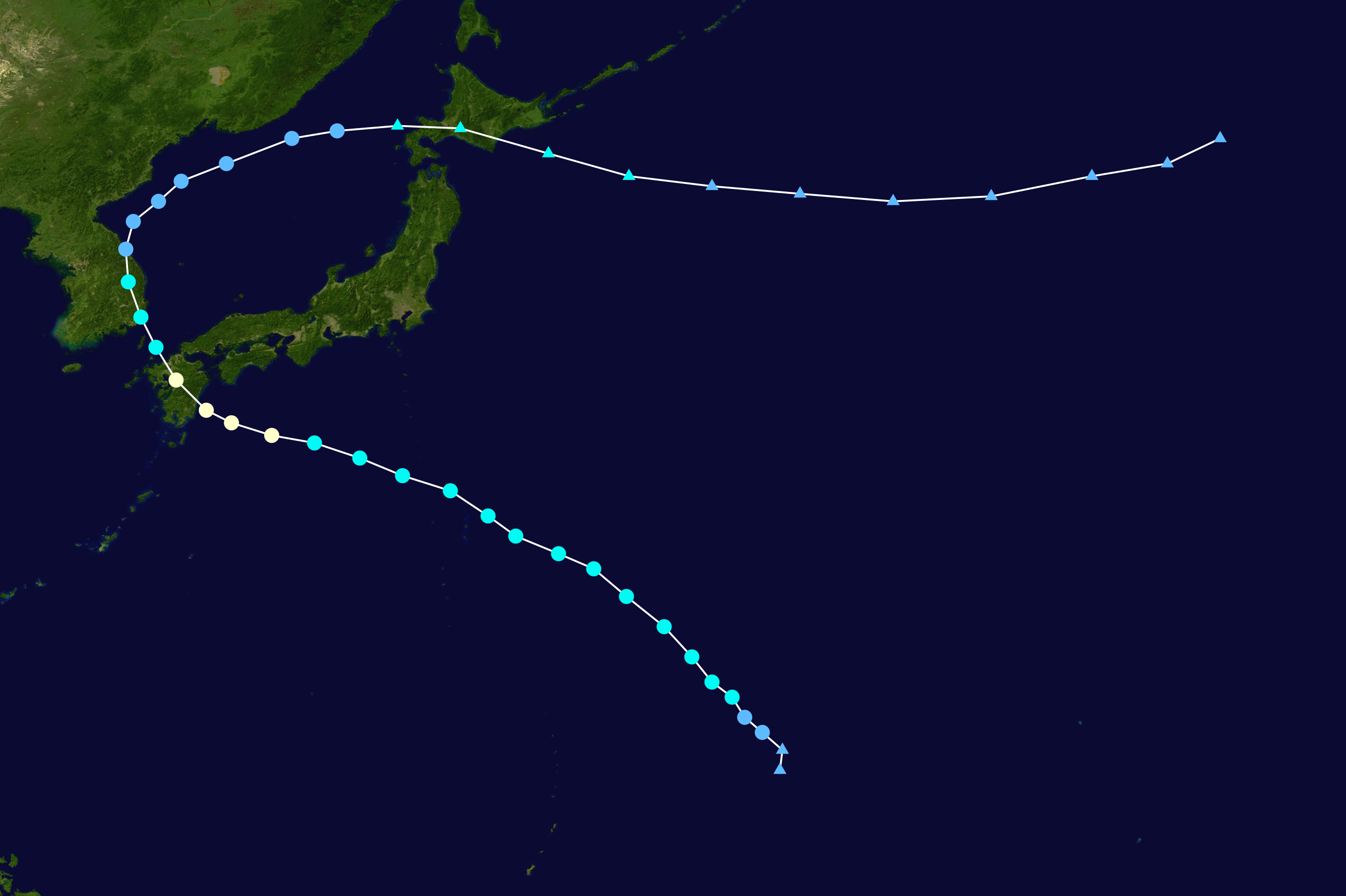
Map plotting the storm's track and intensity, according to the Saffir–Simpson scale Map key Saffir–Simpson scale Tropical depression (≤38 mph, ≤62 km/h) Tropical storm (39–73 mph, 63–118 km/h) Category 1 (74–95 mph, 119–153 km/h) Category 2 (96–110 mph, 154–177 km/h) Category 3 (111–129 mph, 178–208 km/h) Category 4 (130–156 mph, 209–251 km/h) Category 5 (≥157 mph, ≥252 km/h) Unknown Storm type Tropical cyclone Subtropical cyclone Extratropical cyclone, remnant low, tropical disturbance, or monsoon depression

On July 29, 2019, the Joint Typhoon Warning Center (JTWC) (Note: The Joint Typhoon Warning Center is a joint United States Navy – United States Air Force task force that issues tropical cyclone warnings for the western Pacific Ocean and other regions.) began monitoring a trough approximately 695 km (432 mi) north-northwest of Wake Island. Situated in a region of low wind shear, favorable upper-level outflow, and traversing northwest over warm waters, development into a tropical cyclone over subsequent days was anticipated. A defined low-level circulation developed the following day, with convective banding features organizing east of its center. Development was temporarily halted on July 31 by insufficient divergence over a majority of the system. Thereafter, favorable conditions fostered organization. The Japan Meteorological Agency (JMA) (Note: The Japan Meteorological Agency is the official Regional Specialized Meteorological Center for the western Pacific Ocean.) classified the system as a tropical depression at 00:00 UTC on August 1. Similarly, the JTWC classified it as Tropical Depression 09W at 18:00 UTC.

The JMA estimated the system to have become a tropical storm around 12:00 UTC on August 2. At this time, the agency assigned it the name Francisco. Traveling along a general northwest track toward Japan, the system steadily intensified and attained typhoon status around 09:00 UTC on August 5. Typhoon Francisco reached its peak intensity around 12:00 UTC with ten-minute sustained winds of 130 km/h (80 mph) (Note: The Japan Meteorological Agency uses ten-minute sustained winds, while the Joint Typhoon Warning Center uses one-minute sustained winds. The conversion factor between the two is 1.14.) and a pressure of 970 mbar (hPa; 28.64 inHg). The JTWC assessed the storm to have intensified slightly through 18:00 UTC, with maximum one-minute sustained winds of 140 km/h (85 mph). Maintaining this intensity, Francisco made landfall in Miyazaki, Kyushu, around 20:00 UTC (5:00 a.m. local time, August 6). Once overland, the system greatly weakened to a low-end tropical storm before emerging over the Korea Strait shortly after 06:00 UTC on August 6.

Tropical Storm Francisco made landfall in Busan, South Korea, at 11:20 UTC (8:20 p.m. local time) on August 6. Less than an hour after landfall, the Korea Meteorological Administration assessed Francisco to have degenerated into a remnant low; however, the JMA and JTWC continued monitoring it as a tropical cyclone. Emerging over the Sea of Japan early on August 7, the system weakened to a tropical depression. The JTWC estimated Francisco to have remained a tropical storm for 12 more hours before transitioning into an extratropical cyclone; however, the JMA maintained the system as a tropical cyclone until the following day as it turned east. The storm's remnants later impacted Hokkaido on August 8–9 before continuing across the open Pacific. The remnants of Francisco dissipated on August 11, off the east coast of Japan.

== Preparations and impact ==
=== Japan ===
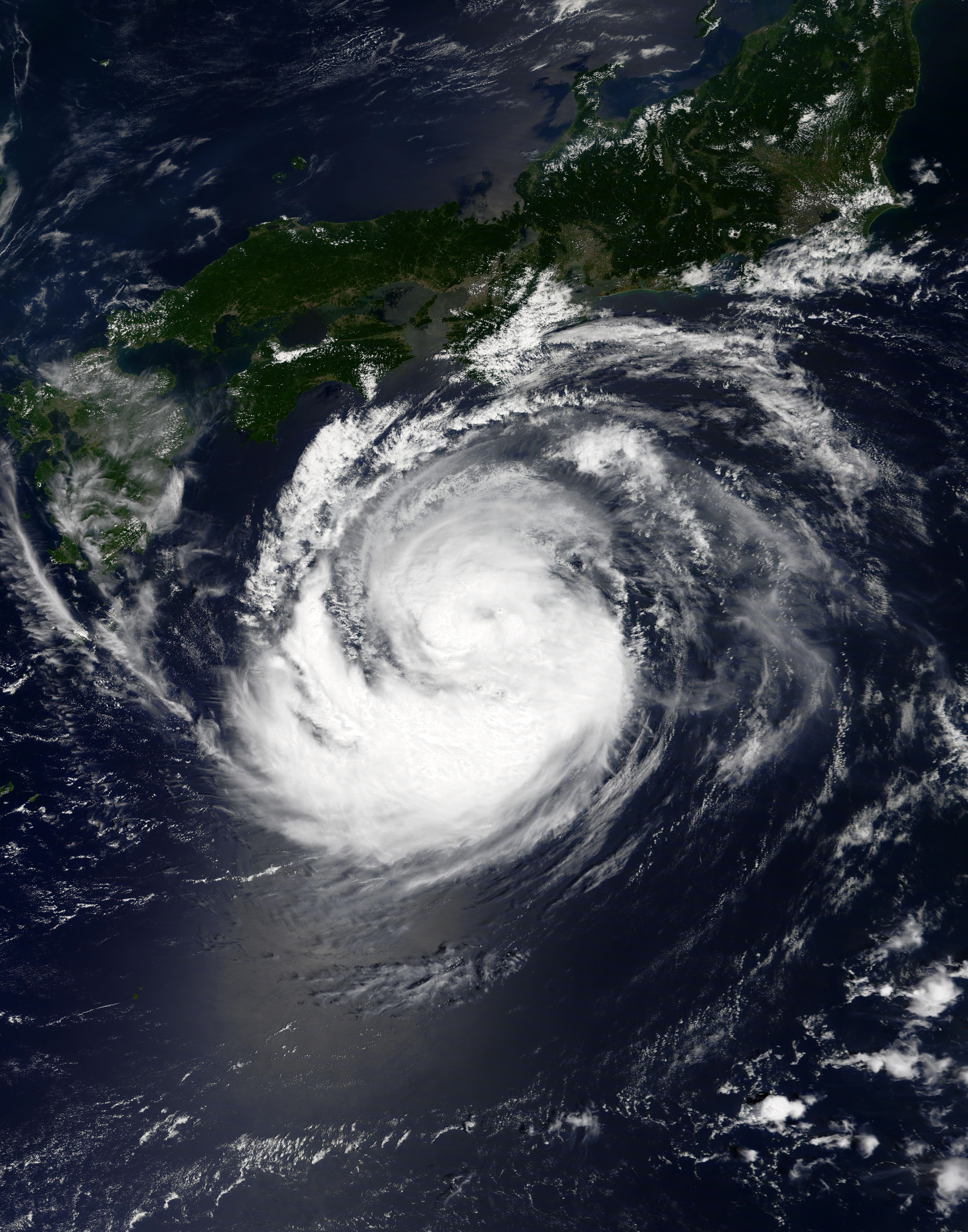
An intensifying Tropical Storm Francisco approaching Japan on August 5

As the typhoon approached Japan, the JMA warned of heavy rainfall across Kyushu and parts of Shikoku. The agency noted a high risk of landslides, flooding, and the possibility of tornadoes. In anticipation of coastal flooding, 20,020 people were evacuated from Kokuraminami-ku and Moji-ku. Sixty-five public shelters were opened across Kagoshima Prefecture. Farther north, voluntary evacuations were issued for 10,500 households in Fukuoka, Kitakyushu, and Chukugo. Kyushu Railway Company and Nishi-Nippon Railroad suspended operations on the night of August 5. Local ferries were docked for the duration of the typhoon. Airline companies collectively cancelled more than 110 flights at Miyazaki Airport, Fukuoka Airport, and Osaka International Airport. Farmers in Ainan began rice harvests early due to the typhoon. In Miyazaki City, the Prefectural Library and Prefectural Art Museum closed for the morning of August 6; however, they reopened later in the day after the typhoon's passage. Repair work on Kumamoto Castle were suspended to prevent any equipment from damaging the structure. The United States Navy raised the Tropical Cyclone Condition of Readiness for Fleet Activities Sasebo on August 3. These levels rose as the typhoon approached Japan.

Striking Kyushu, Francisco brought heavy rain and strong winds to much of the island. Rainfall peaked at 275 mm (10.8 in) in Nobeoka. Most of the rain fell within a 12-hour span, notably 232 mm (9.1 in) in Kitaura. Two cities observed record one-hourly rainfall accumulations: 120 mm (4.7 in) in both Nobeoka and Saiki. These rains triggered flash flooding in Nobeoka, damaging four homes, inundating many roads, and submerging cars. One person died of a heart attack when he was swept away by a flooded river in Kokonoe. A maximum wind gust of 143 km/h (89 mph) was observed at Miyazaki Airport. Many trees and signs were felled by the winds citywide, leaving debris strewn across roads. Some structures had windows shattered. Fallen trees took down power lines, leaving 24,710 homes without power. Three people suffered injury, one seriously, after being knocked over by strong winds. Strong winds in Fukuoka damaged a home and prompted the temporary closure of Kanmon Bridge. Wind gusts in Saga Prefecture reached 99 km/h (62 mph). Following the typhoon, officials in Miyazaki Prefecture established a relief fund for affected farmers. Overall the rains proved beneficial for Fukuoka Prefecture which had been suffering from a drought. The combined rains from Danas, Francisco, and Lekima aided in filling Fukuoka Prefecture dam, which reached 81.2 percent capacity.

Ahead of the typhoon's landfall in Kyushu, the system brought strong winds and heavy rain to the southern coast of Shikoku. Cape Ashizuri in Tosashimizu experienced peak gusts of 100 km/h (62 mph). Off the coast of Minamibōsō, Chiba, a fishing boat capsized amid rough seas produced by the typhoon on August 5. The boat's captain drowned and the one crew member suffered injury. At Kobe University, a rowing boat with 23 students aboard capsized due to high winds; the students were able to swim 100 m (330 ft) to shore without injury. Humid air brought north by the typhoon exacerbated the effects of a deadly heat wave in eastern Japan. The remnants of Francisco later brought heavy rain to Hokkaido on August 8–9. Accumulations reached 147 mm (5.8 in) in Uryū. Of this, 137.5 mm (5.41 in) fell within 12 hours, a record for that duration in the city. The Uryu River swelled to near-flood stage, prompting evacuation orders for 240 households in Fukagawa and 80 more in Numata.

=== Korean Peninsula ===
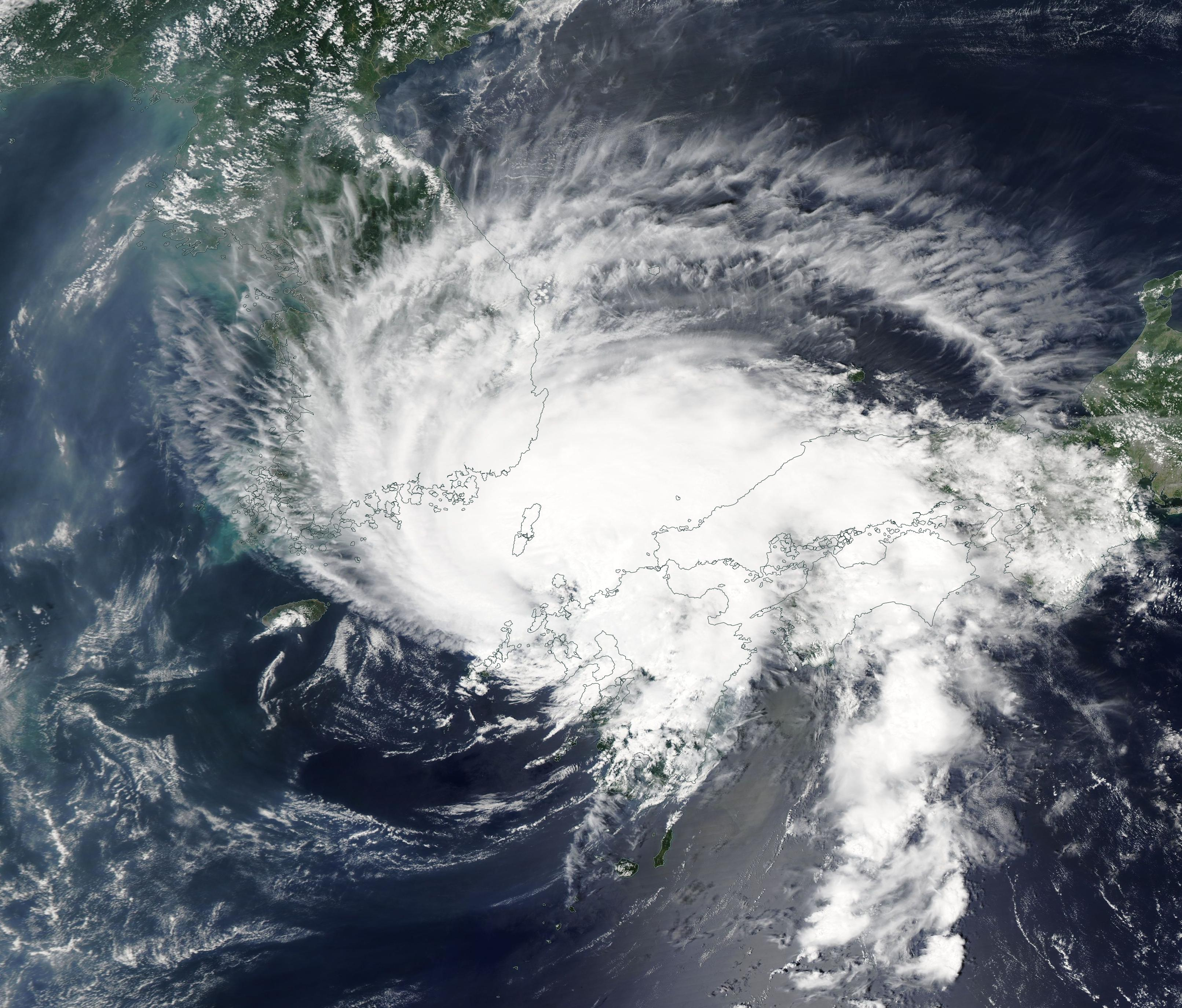
Tropical Storm Francisco over the Korea Strait on August 6

In anticipation of the storm's arrival, the Korean Meteorological Agency issued heavy rain warnings for eastern provinces and mountainous areas. Seagoing vessels were advised to stay at port in the Korea Strait and western Sea of Japan. TCCOR levels for Commander Fleet Activities Chinhae were raised beginning on August 5 and remained in place through the duration of the typhoon. Precipitation was greatest along the east coast, peaking at 190 mm (7.5 in) at Seoraksan. Mountainous areas experienced the greatest winds, with gusts reaching 96 km/h (60 mph) at an unspecified location. The overall effects of Francisco were limited; twelve structures sustained damage in Busan. Rain-slicked roads led to hazardous driving conditions, resulting in a few accidents. Two people were injured when a truck fell on its side. Isolated flooding affected parts of Gangwon Province, with several people requiring rescue. A baseball match between the Samsung Lions and NC Dinos was cancelled mid-game due to heavy rain.

A weakening Francisco brought rainfall to parts of North Korea. Additional rainfall from Typhoon Lekima and subsequent storms led to flood concerns along the Tumen River in Rason. Twenty-five North Korean fishing boats seeking to avoid the storm sought refuge in Olga Bay, within Russia's Primorsky Krai.

=== Russia ===
On August 7, the Russian Ministry of Emergencies warned of heavy rains and damaging winds in Primorsky Krai from the remnants of Francisco. Seagoing vessels were advised to avoid travel along the Primorsky coast until the storm abated. The MS Maasdam was forced to dock early in Vladivostok. Forty rescue personnel were preemptively deployed to Khasansky, Lazovsky, and Ussuriysk in anticipation of flooding. Southern areas of Primorsky were most affected, with rainfall in some locations amounting to 60 percent of the August monthly average. Accumulations peaked at 91 mm (3.6 in) in Partizansk while Vladivostok saw 77 mm (3.0 in). Most of the rain fell within a 12-hour period. Many rivers in the region rose by 0.2–0.8 m (0.66–2.62 ft). Some roads were submerged, including the A370 portion of the Trans-Siberian Highway between Khabarovsk and Vladivostok; the highway was temporarily shut down in this location. A bridge near Krounovka was overtopped by a swollen river, isolating the village. A temporary boat crossing was established to ferry residents. Eighteen tourists became stranded in Yezhovaya Bay due to flooded roads. Several structures in Novostroyka experienced basement flooding. In Vladivostok strong winds downed multiple trees, leaving some neighborhoods without power and damaging cars.

== See also ==
- Weather of 2019
- Tropical cyclones in 2019
