= 2006 Surat flood =

Natural disaster in Surat, India

2006 Surat Flood
- Gaurav Path flooded in water
- Date: 7 August 2006–10 August 2006
- Location: Surat
- Deaths: 120-150: Unofficial figure as high as 500
- Property damage: Rs. 9,500 - 21,000 crores

The 2006 Surat flood occurred over 7–10 August 2006, which affected Surat, India, and nearby villages. About 80–95% of Surat was flooded.

The sudden release of a large amount of water into the Tapti River from the Ukai Dam caused the flood. The Government of Gujarat described the flood as a natural disaster, while reports from the People's Committee on Gujarat Floods of August 2006 and the Surat Citizens' Council Trust's Committee, described the flood as being the result of mismanagement.

== History of floods in Surat ==
In the 20th century the city of Surat has suffered from some 20 floods. The 1968 flood was one of the major floods with peak water flow of about 15 lakh cubic foot per second (cfs or cusec), while the 1970 flood had a peak flow about 13.14 lakh cfs.

The Ukai Dam was constructed in 1972, flood control was one of the objectives of the dam's construction. After the dam was constructed 90 km upstream from Surat, there were no major floods until 1994. The floods of 1978 and 1979 were effectively managed by the dam.

In the 1998 flood more than 30% area of Surat was flooded due to the release of water from Ukai Dam.

== Causes ==
Due to heavy rainfall during 2006 in upstream basin areas, the inflow at Ukai Dam increased. The water level of the dam reservoir was increasing rapidly. On the morning of 3 August, the reservoir had already crossed the prescribed rule level of 333.60 feet (101.68 m).

Water level and flow at Ukai dam reservoir
Date (2006)	Time	Inflow (cfs)	Outflow (cfs)	Water level (m)
5 Aug	8 am	85,958	26,664	102.20
5 Aug	8 pm	48,554	23,640	102.26
6 Aug	8 am	75,087	124,920	102.14
6 Aug	8 pm	330,216	254,780	102.57
7 Aug	8 am	853,679	409,004	103.46
7 Aug	8 pm	1,072,680	816,036	104.22
8 Aug	8 am	1,053,133	844,092	104.97
8 Aug	8 pm	961,466	907,316	105.33
9 Aug	8 am	856,000	850,000	105.34
9 Aug	8 pm	711,757	650,000	105.38

The inflow at dam was 85,958 cfs on 5 August 8 am, then rises to 330,216 cfs on 6 August 8 pm. On the morning of 7 August it became 853,679 cfs. By that time the reservoir was already 90% full, leaving very little empty space left to accommodate the floodwater coming from upstream. The inflow was still increasing. The peak inflow during the flood was about 1,200,000 cfs, but it lasted only for two hours.

Operating the gates of the dams increased the outflow rapidly. The outflow increased from 124,920 on 6 August, 8 am cfs, to 409,004 cfs on 7 August 8.00 am. Maintaining the same pace of increase the outflow was increased to a peak of 907,316 cfs at 8 pm on 8 August. The heavy outflow of about 900,000 cfs for a prolonged period of time caused the flood in Surat and other downstream villages. The high tide of the sea during the flood further reduced the drainage capacity of the river and worsened the damage due to flooding.

The Government of Gujarat described the flood as a natural disaster, while reports from the People's Committee on Gujarat Floods of August 2006 and the Surat Citizens' Council Trust's Committee, described the flood as being the result of mismanagement.

== See also ==
- 2005 Gujarat flood
- 2017 Gujarat flood
- 2019 Vadodara flood
