= 2005 Gujarat flood =

2005 natural disaster in the Indian state of Gujarat

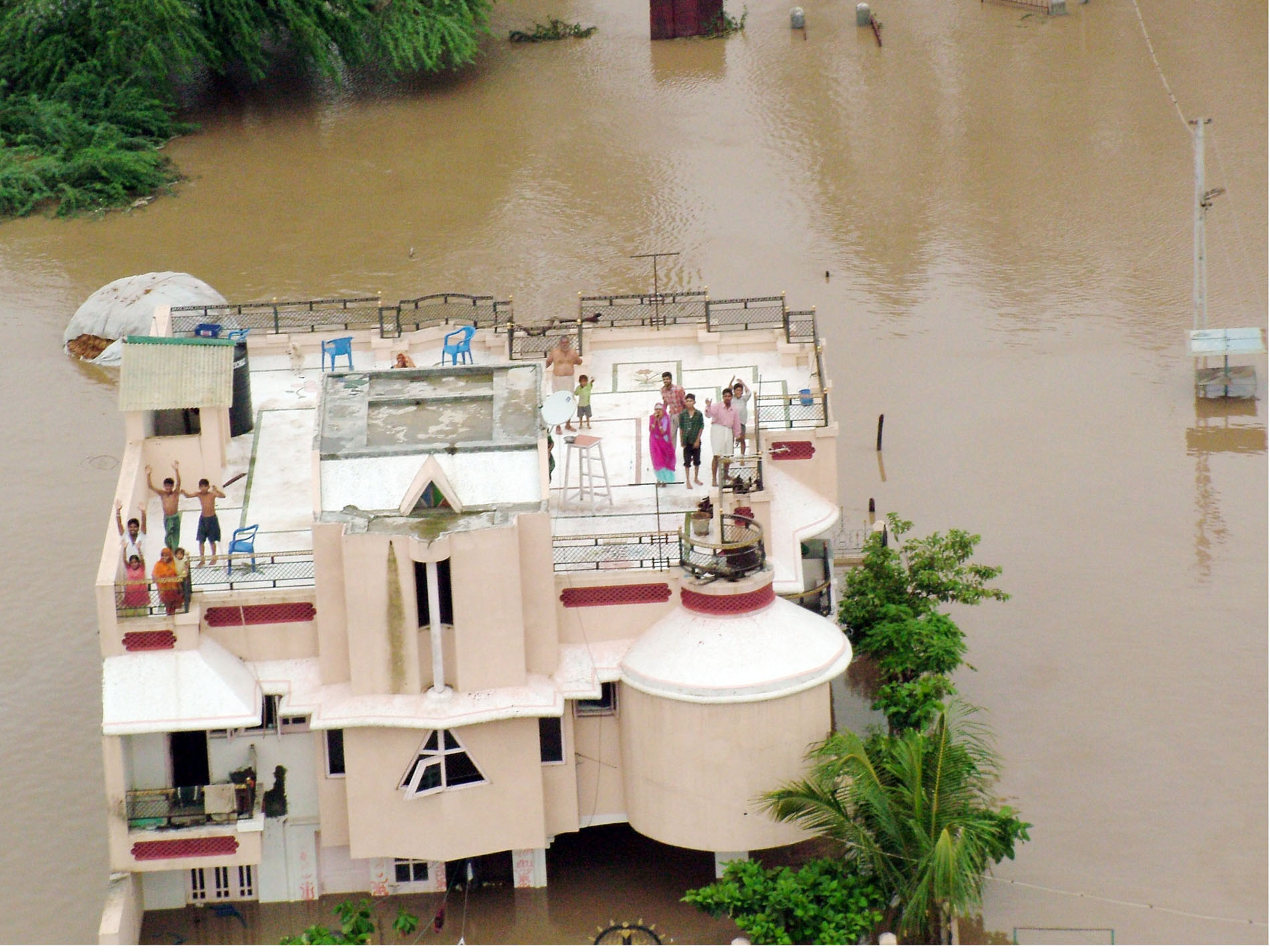
- Aerial view of flood in Gujarat

Meteorological history
- Duration: June–July 2005

Overall effects
- Fatalities: 173 dead, approx. 176,000 homeless
- Areas affected: Gujarat

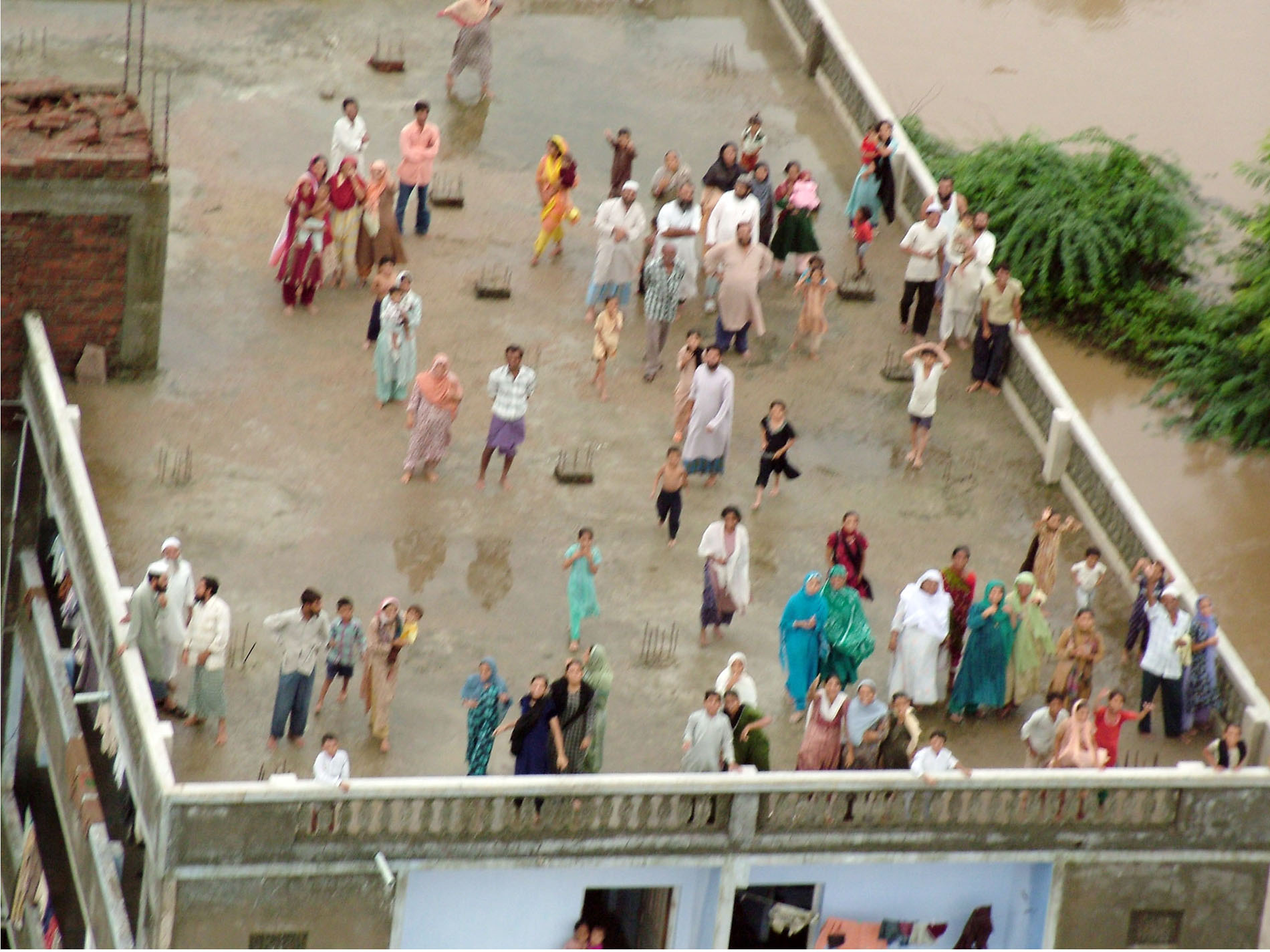
An aerial view taken from the IAF relief Helicopter of the flood in Gujarat

The 2005 Gujarat floods, during the monsoon season, affected the state of Gujarat, India, that included 20 districts (out of 33), with 10 of them severely affected. 117 of the 225 Tehsils (Talukas or mandals), 11 cities were included, and more than 7,200 villages inundated, with up to 10,000 affected. The cumulative 505 millimetres (19.9 in) of rain left approximately 176,000 people homeless during the flooding that included the drowning of a rare Asiatic lion from the Gir wildlife sanctuary. At least 173 people were killed in the flooding.

== History ==
Eleven cities were severely affected by the floods that were Vadodara, Nadiad, Ahmedabad, Navsari, Surat and Limbdi, Dakor, Anand, Kheda, Petlad, and Borsad.

== Timeline ==
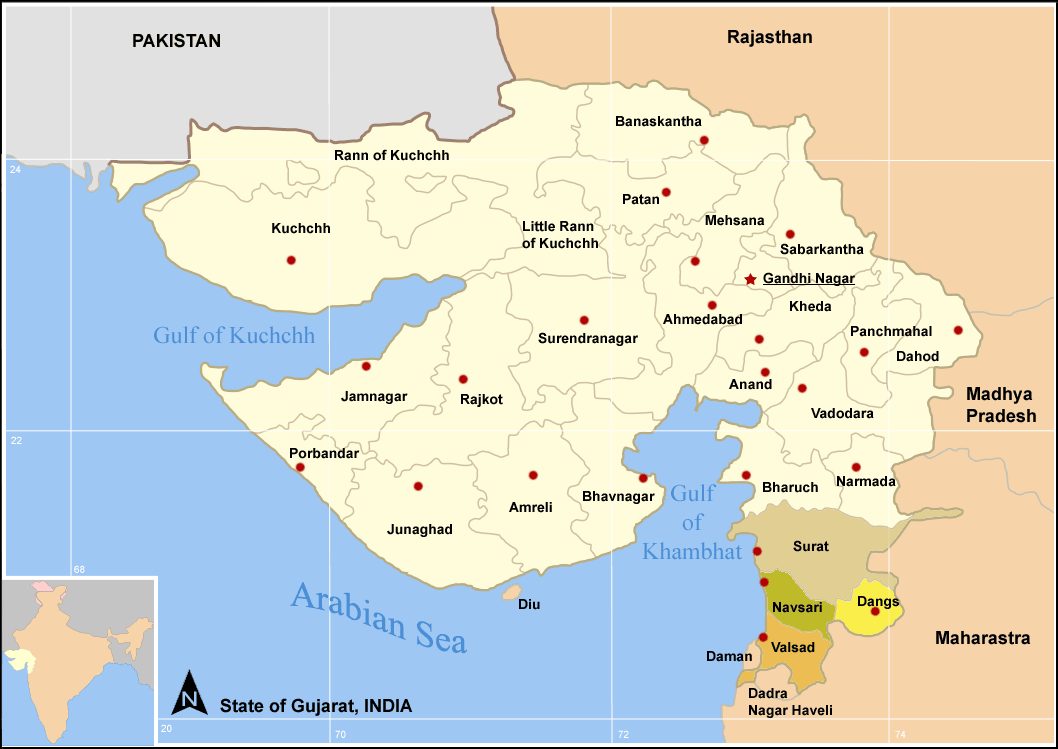
Southerns districts of Gujarat.

last week of, June, 2005	Heavy down-pour on many parts of Gujarat
June 30	the state was put on high alert, the army on standby
July 1	All trains on the Ahmedabad-Mumbai line are cancelled
July 2	Death toll reaches to 123, more than 250,000 people evacuated
July 7	Rain stops, order is restored slowly in some parts of the state
July 8	Trains resumes operations, but under restrictions and caution
July 11	Overall infrastructure damage and loss estimated to be over USD 1.7 bn. Districts of southern Gujarat are worst affected.
July 13	As per the latest report total number of deaths due to floods in the state reach up to 173.

== See also ==
- Disaster Management Act, 2005
- Maharashtra floods of 2005
- 2005 Chennai floods
- 2006 Surat flood
- 2017 Gujarat flood
- 2019 Vadodara flood
