= 2019 Pune flood =

Flood in India

- Pune (Maharashtra) Pune (India)
- Date: 25 September 2019 - 28 September 2019
- Duration: 3 days
- Location: Pune, India; 18°31′29.61″N 73°43′22.36″E
- Type: Flash flood
- Deaths: 22

Between 25–28 September 2019, Pune, India, and its division received a heavy amount of rainfall which caused flash flooding. In addition to people lost to these floods, other rain-related incidents such as collapsed compound walls of buildings have killed at least 21 people. Three NDRF teams along with the Army was deployed in the district for rescue operations.

== Background ==
The monsoon season in south Asia typically starts around early June each year and brings heavy rainfall and potential flooding to nation. However, the 2019 monsoon season started in late June and has been unusually heavy in terms of rainfall, with a 6.5% increase in rainfall averaged across India. In the Pune district, prior to the flooding, it had received 180% of its annual rainfall for the year due to the monsoon season, and its local Khadakwasla dam along with other three important dams were filled completely.

== Flooding ==
More than 16 centimetres (6.3 in) of rain was measured in Pune, Baramati and Pune district between the night of 25 September and the afternoon of 26 September which was the highest rainfall in last 10 years. Coupled with the existing rain from the previous months, flash floods started to occur. The flash flooding was caused by short intense periods of rainfall that overwhelmed water runoff systems like nullahs and flooded roads.

The full Khadakwasla dam saw an additional 8.7 centimetres (3.4 in) of rain during this time, leading authorities to release some of the water to overflow into the Mutha River at a rate of 13,891 cubic feet per second (393.3 m^{3}/s) to prevent damage. Similarly, the Nazare Dam near Saswad was also at capacity, and its waters were released at a rate of 85,000 cubic feet per second (2,400 m^{3}/s) into the Karha river late on night of 25 September, inundating areas of Purandar and Baramati.

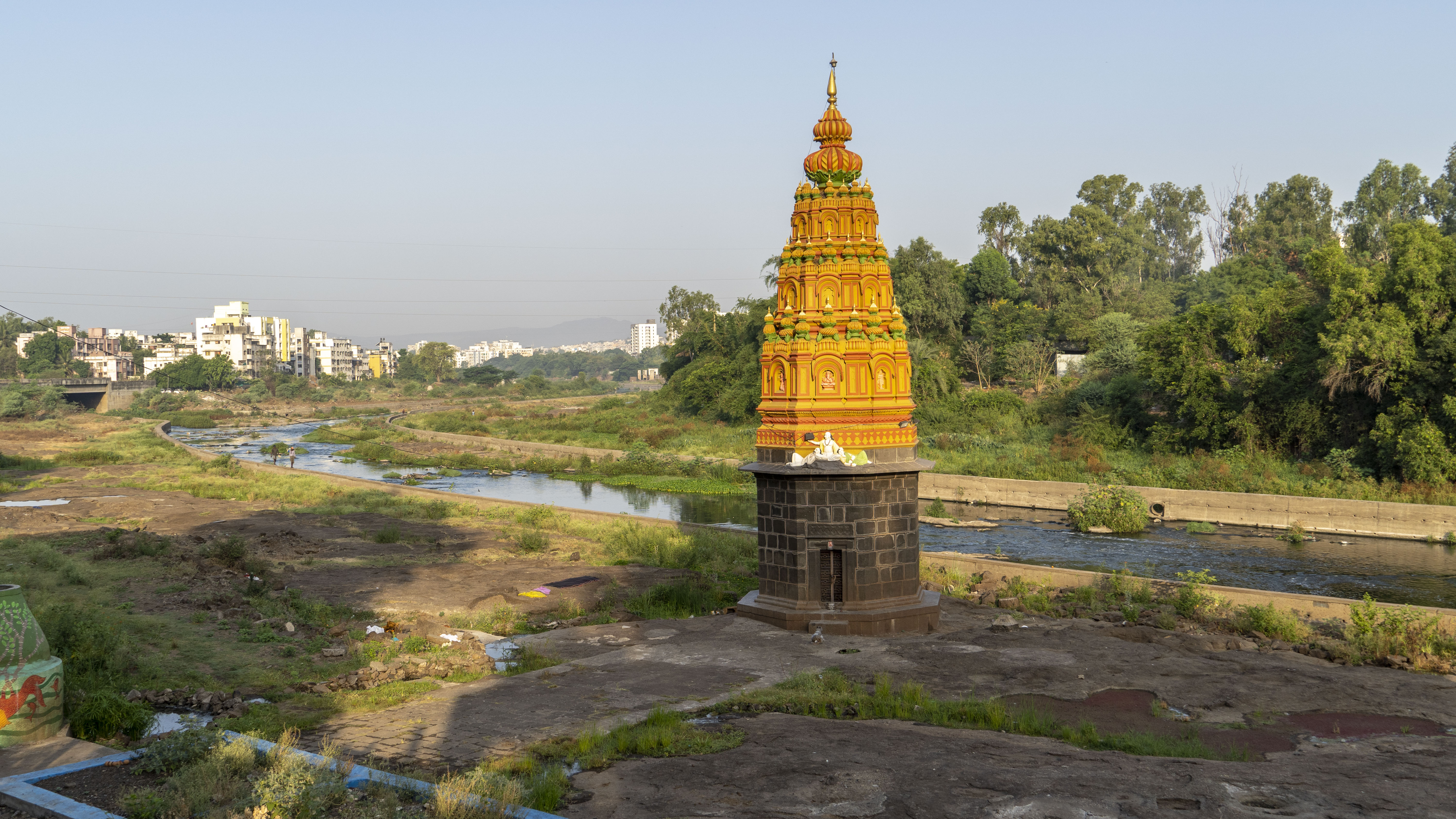
Vitthal Temple after the floods

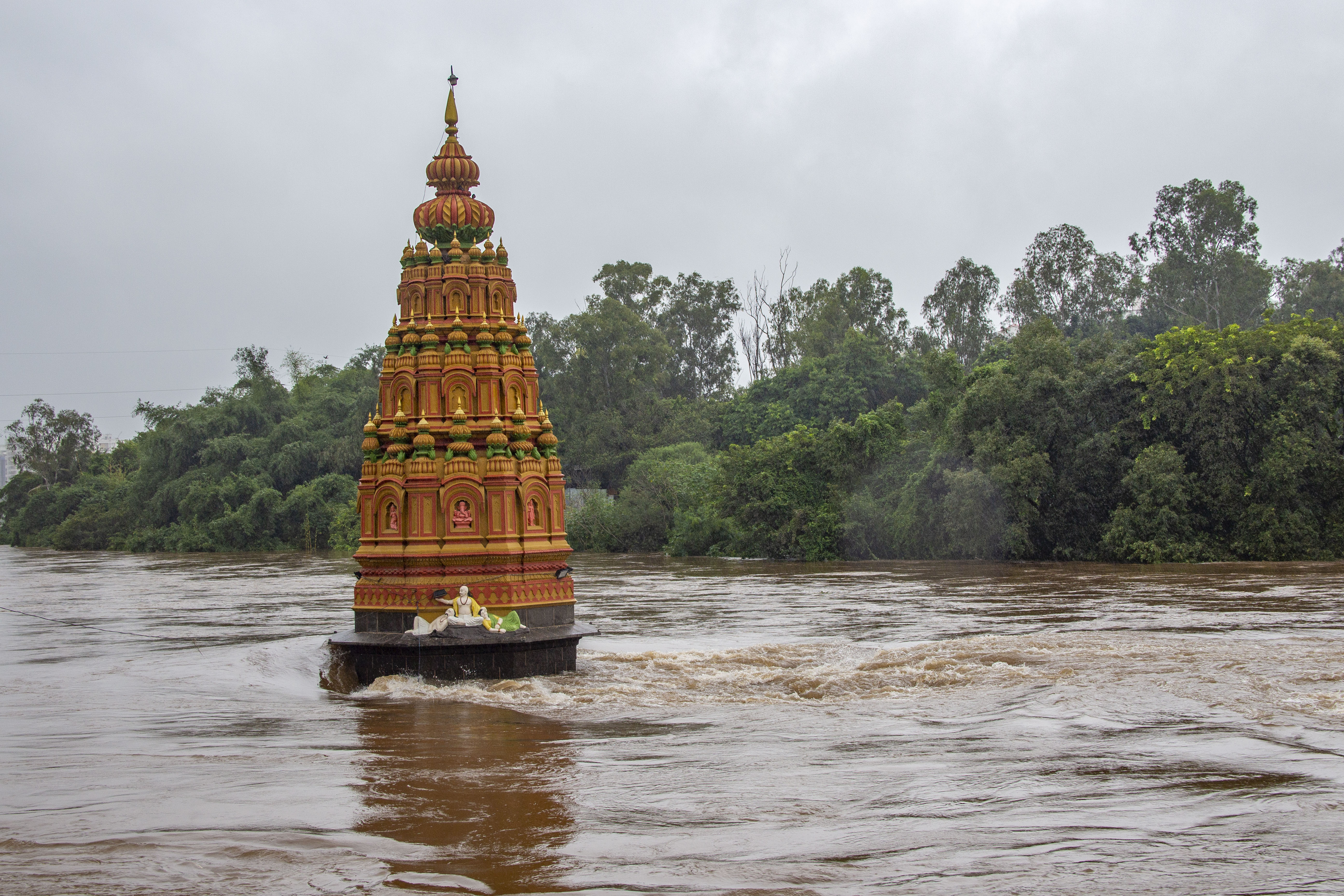
Vitthal temple during the floods

== Relief and rescue ==
Two teams of NDRF were employed in the Pune city and two teams were employed in the Baramati. The flood caused 21 deaths, 5 missing, and evacuation of more than 28,000 people living in the city.

== Aftermath ==
In October 2022, the Pune Municipal Corporation (PMC) sanctioned ₹36 crore to replace the century-old bridge over Bhairoba Nullah in Wanowrie. The project followed the September 2019 flash floods, where several commuters were washed away while crossing the inundated structure. Designed to prevent such fatalities, the new 15-meter-long bridge is significantly higher and wider than the original, which frequently submerged by up to 2.5 feet during monsoons. Construction began after the old bridge's demolition in 2022 and was completed in 2023.

== See also ==
- 2019 Vadodara flood
