= Tornado outbreak =

Multiple tornadoes spawned from the same weather system

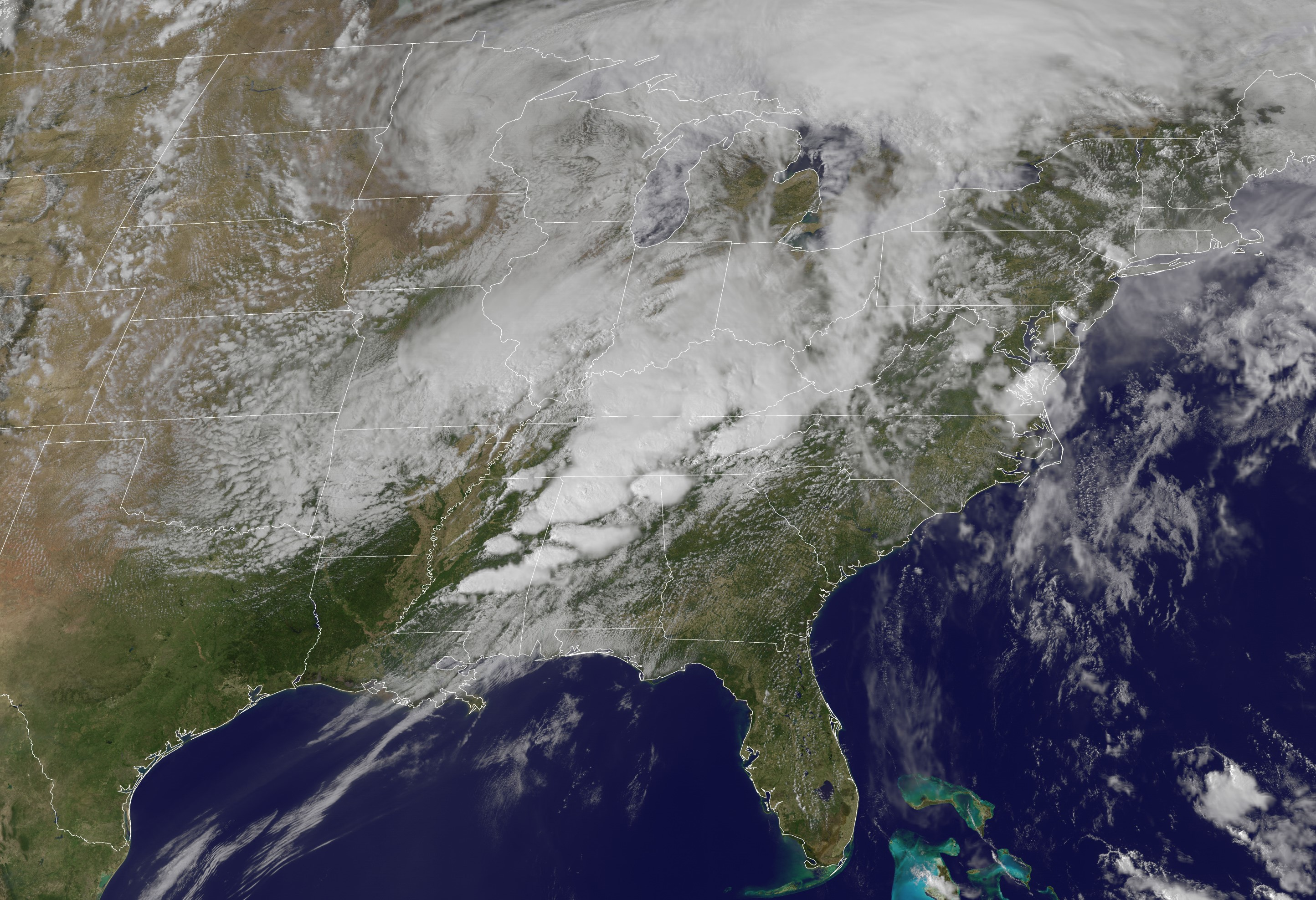
A satellite view of the 2011 Super Outbreak

A tornado outbreak is the occurrence of multiple tornadoes spawned by the same synoptic scale weather system. The number of tornadoes required to qualify as an outbreak are typically at least six to ten, with at least two rotational locations (if squall line) or at least two supercells producing multiple tornadoes.

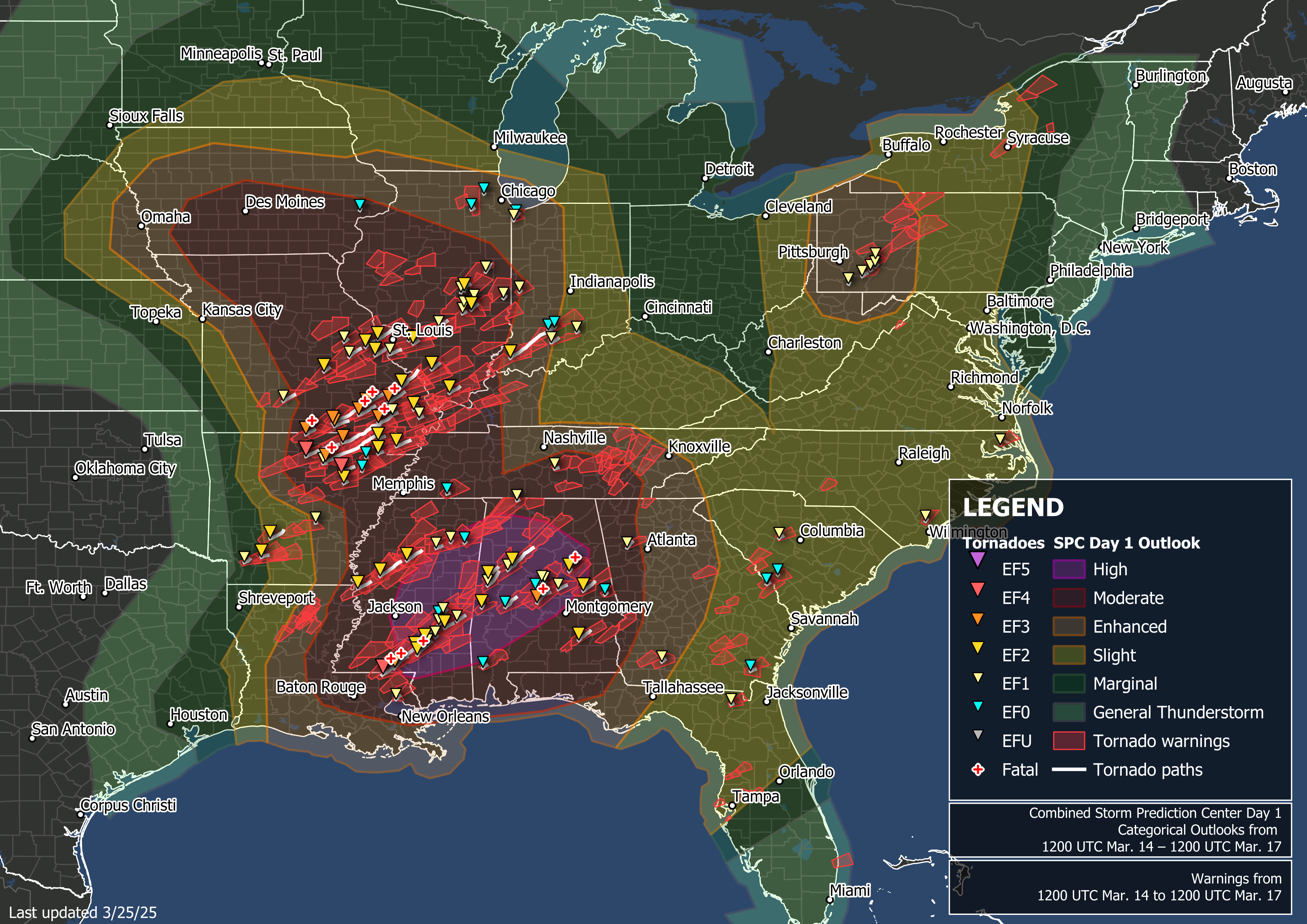
All of the confirmed tornadoes from a large tornado outbreak in March from March 13-17, 2025.

The tornadoes usually occur within the same day or continue into the early morning hours of the succeeding day, and within the same region. Most definitions allow for a break in tornado activity (time elapsed from the end of the last tornado to the beginning of the next tornado) of six hours. If tornado activity indeed resumes after such a lull, many definitions consider the event to be a new outbreak. A series of continuous or nearly continuous tornado outbreak days is a tornado outbreak sequence. In the United States and Canada, tornado outbreaks usually occur from March through June in the Great Plains, the Midwestern United States, and the Southeastern United States in an area colloquially referred to as Tornado Alley. A secondary less active and annually inconsistent tornado "season" in the U.S. occurs in late autumn. Tornado outbreaks can also occur during other times of the year and in other parts of the world. In Europe, tornado season typically peaks around the summer months, although windstorms can spawn tornadoes in other seasons as well.

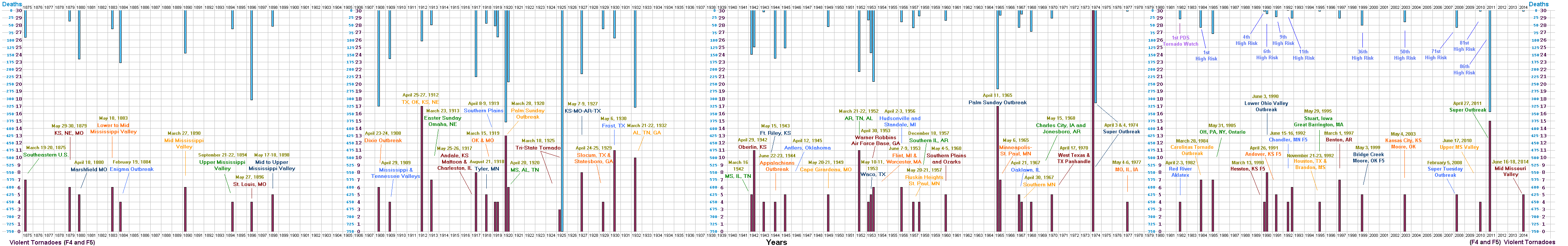
A timeline showing three day sequences with at least four violent tornadoes and the number of deaths associated with each. (1875–2014)

Very large tornado outbreaks are known as super outbreaks. The largest tornado outbreak on record was the 2011 Super Outbreak, with 362 tornadoes and about $10 billion in direct damages. It surpassed the 1974 Super Outbreak, in which 148 tornadoes were counted. Both occurred within the United States and Canada. The total number of tornadoes is a problematic method of comparing outbreaks from different periods, however, as many more weaker tornadoes, but not stronger tornadoes, are reported in the US in recent decades than in previous ones due to improvements in tornado detection.

== Tornado outbreak sequence ==
A tornado outbreak sequence, or tornado outbreak day sequence, sometimes referred to as an extended tornado outbreak, is a period of continuous or nearly continuous high tornado activity consisting of a series of tornado outbreaks over multiple days with no or very few days lacking tornado outbreaks.

Major tornado outbreak sequences occurred in the United States in May 1917, 1930, 1949, 1965 and 2003. Another exceptional outbreak sequence apparently occurred during mid to late May 1896. Although some days lacked tornado outbreaks, the period from mid to late April 2011 and late May 2019 also were periods of especially high tornado activity.

Tornado outbreak sequences tend to dominate the tornado statistics for a year and often cause a spike in tornado numbers for the entire year. Not all periods of active tornado occurrences are outbreak sequences, there must be no break in the activity to satisfy the definition. Active periods occur ranging from every year to every several years whereas continuously active periods are less common and can be rare depending on the parameters applied to define a sequence. By the late 2010s, medium to long range forecasting advanced sufficiently that some periods of high tornado activity can be somewhat reliably predicted several days to several weeks in advance.

== See also ==
- Lists of tornadoes and tornado outbreaks
- Outbreak intensity score
