= Tornado outbreak sequence of May 2019 =

Tornado outbreak sequence in the United States

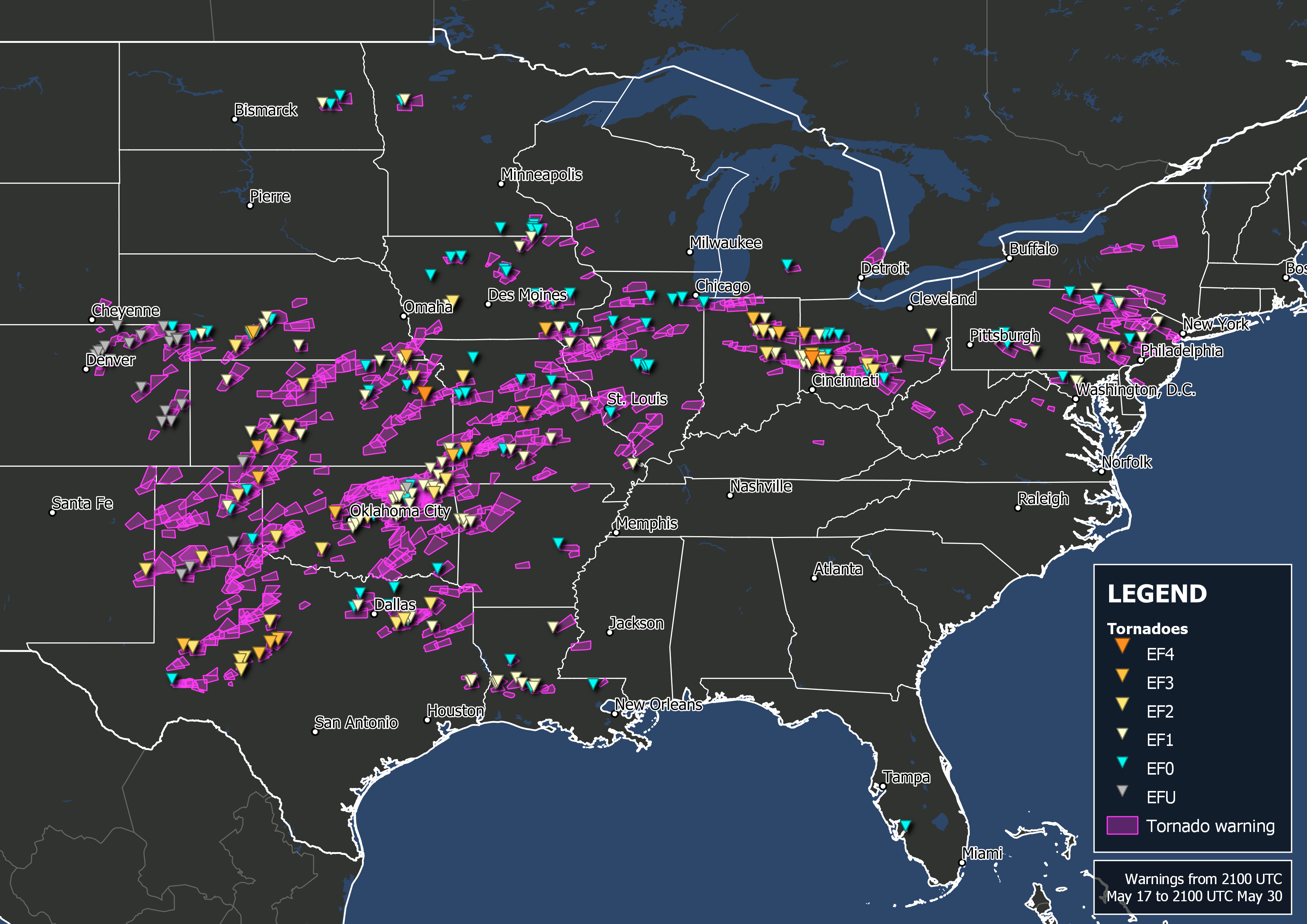
Map of tornado warnings issued by the National Weather Service between May 17 and May 29, 2019, over the eastern United States and tornadoes confirmed and surveyed by the National Weather Service

The tornado outbreak sequence of May 2019 consists of three separate tornado outbreaks over the period of two weeks in the United States in May 2019.

- Tornado outbreak of May 17–18, 2019 – Large tornado outbreak in the Plains, first of the three
- Tornado outbreak of May 20–23, 2019 – Major tornado outbreak that caused a high risk to be issued for Oklahoma, producing a total of 114 tornadoes across the Central U.S.
- Tornado outbreak of May 25–30, 2019 – Another major and deadlier tornado outbreak that produced 182 tornadoes in the central and eastern U.S. several days after the previous one, including two violent EF4s in Ohio and Kansas.
