= 2019 Havana tornado =

Extreme weather event in Cuba

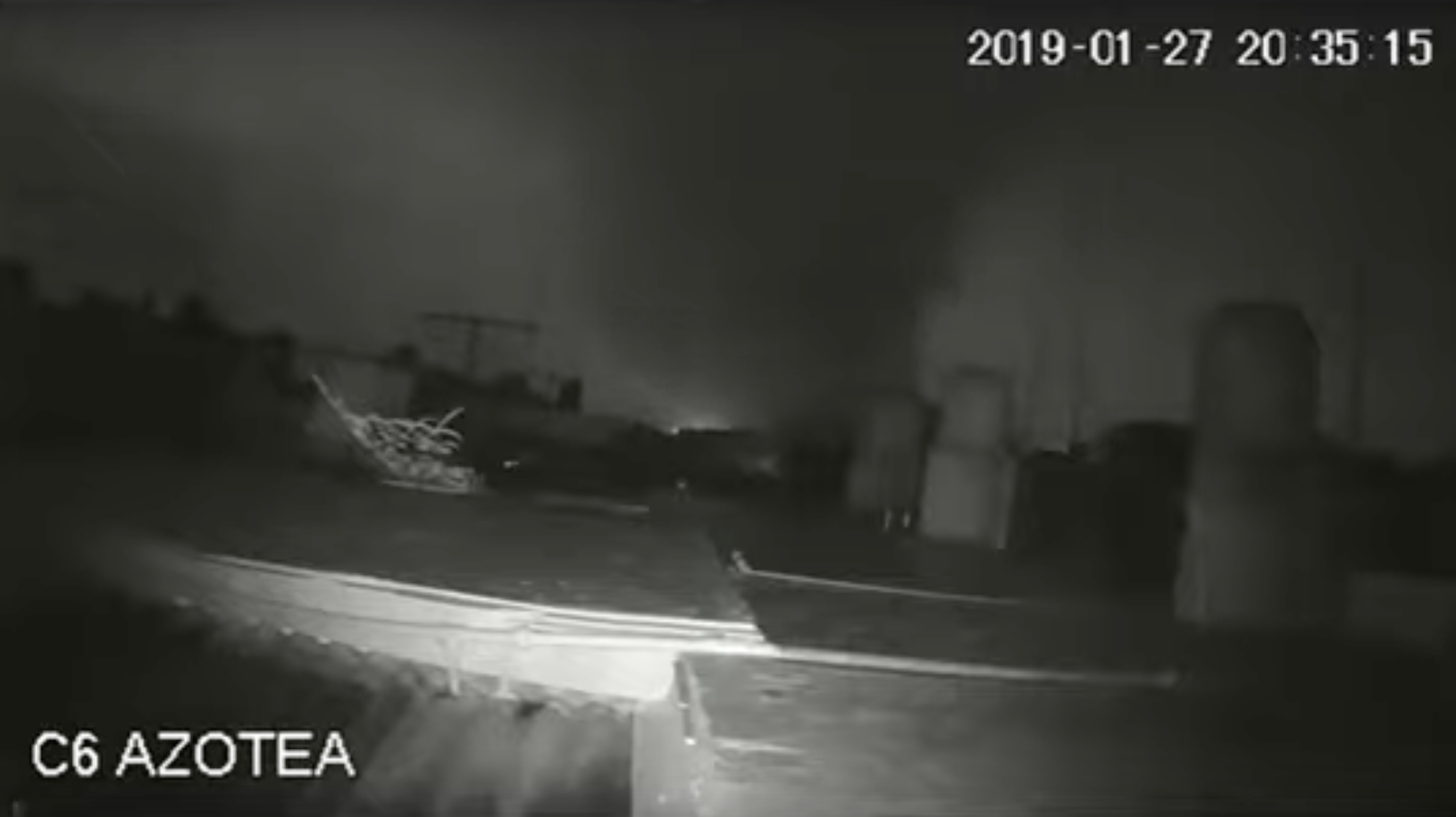
- The tornado seen from a security camera

Meteorological history
- Formed: 27 January 2019 20:20 (CST)
- Dissipated: 27 January 2019, 20:46 (CST)
- Duration: 26 minutes

EF4 tornado
- on the Enhanced Fujita scale
- Highest winds: 185 mph (300 km/h)

Overall effects
- Fatalities: 8
- Injuries: 190+
- Areas affected: Havana, Cuba
- Part of the tornado outbreaks of 2019

During the evening hours of January 27, 2019, at 20:20 CST, an unusually violent and destructive tornado ripped through the Cuban capital Havana. The EF4 tornado toppled trees and utility poles, destroyed cars and sent debris flying as it passed through the city. According to the Cuban Institute of Meteorology, the tornado was produced by a cold front that struck Cuba's north coast, but "there were no indications of the anticipated existence of any cloud that fulfilled the characteristics of a classic supercell, nor a minisupercell, and that would explain the development of the intense tornado". At least eight people died and more than 190 were injured.

== Background ==
Tornadoes in Cuba are not a rare occurrence as the island nation has been struck before in its history; the first tornado ever filmed was located in Cuba in 1933. Many of Cuba's tornadoes have intensity ratings of FU/EFU to F2/EF2 on the Fujita scale. However, five F3/EF3 and four F4/ EF4 tornadoes have been observed.

=== Tornado summary ===
Security camera footage of a violent EF4 tornado that struck Havana, Cuba on January 27, 2019.

At 20:20 local time, a tornadic vortex formed near Casino Deportivo, in the Cerro municipality. It traveled generally east-northeast on a path approximately 20 km (12 mi) long. The tornado traveled at a speed of 46 km/h (29 mph) with wind speeds of approximately ~185 mph (298 km/h) At around 20:46 local time, the tornado entered the Gulf of Mexico via Celimar in Habana del Este.

By that time, the tornado had significantly weakened and was dissipating. Initially, the width of the vortex was 20 m (66 ft) in diameter, but increased to 200 m (660 ft) along most of its path. It was assigned an official rating of EF4 on the Enhanced Fujita scale by the Cuban Meteorology Institute, making this the first F4 or EF4 tornado in Cuba since 1999.

== Aftermath ==
The tornado inflicted the greatest damage in the central and eastern parts of Havana, where numerous well-built masonry homes and businesses were damaged or destroyed. Concrete frame buildings sustained major structural damage, and cars were thrown or crushed under debris. The municipalities most affected were Diez de Octubre, Cerro, Guanabacoa, Regla, and San Miguel del Padrón. At least 1,238 of the 4,800 homes affected were seriously damaged, with 500 totally destroyed and 757 partially. At least 224 homes had completely lost their roof and 124 lost part of it.

Nineteen medical infrastructures suffered extensive damage, including polyclinics, general practitioner clinics, nursing homes and pharmacies. The Obstetrics-Gynecology Teaching Hospital sustained the worst damage. Another hospital; the Hijas de Galicia Maternity Hospital was also damaged, and patients and staff had to be evacuated. Eighty schools were also structurally affected. Many school buildings suffered structural damage to roofs and walls. A further 21 day care facilities were damaged, and numerous trees and power poles were snapped along the path.

== Casualties ==
Early reports by President Miguel Díaz-Canel said there were three deaths and 172 injures in a Twitter post. Later, according to Reuters, eight people were killed and over 190 were injured. Ten people suffered life-threatening injuries. Among the fatalities was a 54-year-old woman who died when the tornado tore through her house while searching for a shelter to hide in. Another man died when his home collapsed onto him. Two people initially hospitalized also succumbed to their injuries.

The United Nations Office for the Coordination of Humanitarian Affairs and UN Cuban headquarters reported that 253,682 were directly affected by the destructive tornado, with 80,000 people in the direct path. Of the 9,937 people evacuated, at least 9,413 were living in the homes of friends and families while 524 were placed in government shelters. Over 144,000 residents did not have access to electricity after the disaster; some still remained without power over a week later.

== Response ==
Rescue and recovery operations began immediately after the tornado. On 27 January, at 20:00, President Díaz-Canel arranged a meeting with the Council of Ministers to discuss the progress made on recovery efforts. He was informed by ministers of the damage and casualties in the affected areas. Private businesses were also involved in the provision and distribution of basic needs such as clothing and food to needing individuals. Several musical artists organized benefit concerts and personally distributed aid to the affected.

== See also ==
- List of North American tornadoes and tornado outbreaks
