= Novostroyka, Pallasovsky District, Volgograd Oblast =

Novostroyka Новостройка
- Settlement
- Location within Volgograd Oblast Location within Russia
- Coordinates: 50°01′N 46°52′E
- Country: Russia
- Region: Volgograd Oblast
- District: Pallasovsky District
- Time zone: UTC+4:00

Novostroyka (Russian: Новостройка) is a rural locality (a settlement) and the administrative center of Kalashnikovskoye Rural Settlement, Pallasovsky District, Volgograd Oblast, Russia. The population was 1,926 as of 2010. There are 37 streets.

== Geography ==
Novostroyka is located on the left bank of the Torgun River, 4 km south of Pallasovka (the district's administrative centre) by road. Pallasovka is the nearest rural locality.
