= 2019 Bara–Parsa tornado =

First officially recorded tornado in Nepal

March 2019 southern Nepal tornado
- Bara and Parsa districts affected by the tornado

Meteorological history
- Formed: March 31, 2019 7:45 PM (NPT)
- Dissipated: ~ March 31, 2019 8:15 PM (NPT)
- Duration: ~40 minutes

EF2+ tornado
- on the Enhanced Fujita scale
- Highest winds: 111 to 165 mph (179 to 266 km/h)

Overall effects
- Fatalities: 28 (official), 50 (reported)
- Damage: रू 90 million ($800,000 USD)
- Areas affected: Bara and Parsa districts of Nepal
- Houses destroyed: 1,059 (1,342 homes damaged)
- Part of the tornado outbreaks of 2019

On March 31, 2019, a powerful "rainstorm" swept across two districts of southern Nepal killing at least 28 and injuring more than 1,100 people. It was later identified as the first confirmed case of a tornado in Nepal. Lacking advanced technologies to predict or record a tornado, the scientists instead based their findings on forensic evidence, including witness accounts. The government has insisted that technological upgrades are being instituted to improve the country's virtually non-existent weather-warning system.

The tornado originated in Chitwan National Park and followed a path 200–250 metres (220–270 yd) wide and 30 kilometres (19 mi) long through several villages in Bara and Parsa districts, accompanied by rain, hail and thunderstorm. The tornado was later determined to have been strong, estimated to have been of EF2 or EF3 strength. A humanitarian crisis ensued in the impoverished rural farming communities affected by the disaster. Emergency aid and response began soon after, with the Nepalese Army and Nepal Red Cross Society distributing supplies, while hospitals in the affected areas were overwhelmed with the number of injuries. Relief worth millions of rupees were announced for the victims in the aftermath of the tragedy. The government of Nepal also paid for the health expenses of all injured.

== Background ==
Prior to the 2019 event, no tornado had ever been officially confirmed in Nepal; the lack of such events is reflected by the Nepali language not having a word for "tornado". However, elderly residents in the Terai have a Maithili and Hindi word for tornado: chakrawat. Nepal has a limited meteorological network and records of past weather events are sparse. Some parts of the country had no log of data prior to 1956. In that year the India Meteorological Department established weather stations, later turning over responsibility to the Nepalese government in 1966. Concerted efforts to steadily expand the observation network began in the 1980s, with 60 rain gauges established by 1985. In 2019, the government built a Doppler weather radar in Surkhet and had plans for two more. Usage of weather balloons was also being tested. Hirohiko Ishikawa, a meteorologist at the Disaster Prevention Research Institute of Kyoto University stated there is a possibility of unrecorded tornadoes in the plains of southeastern of Nepal. A plausible tornado was reported in February 1968: a weather observer recalled a 120 m (390 ft) diameter "pillar of dust and rain" that traveled 0.80 km (0.5 mi) and caused extensive crop damage. Kiran Nepal of the Nepali Times asserts that the 2019 tornado was not the first of its kind and that prior events documented in literature and folklore were overlooked by media.

The Ganges Basin to the south of Nepal occasionally sees tornadoes. Tornadoes in this region are most common during the pre- and post-monsoon months. The United States' National Centers for Environmental Information highlights an increased likelihood of tornadoes from Ganges Basin northwest along the southern slopes of the Himalayas, through Nepal, and into northeastern Pakistan. Reports of tornadoes in this region are primarily clustered in Bangladesh, with only sporadic events farther northwest. The pre-monsoon months (March to May) display the most favorable conditions for severe weather. During this time, convective available potential energy—an indicator of atmospheric instability whereby higher values denote a greater likelihood of thunderstorms—and wind shear are conducive to the development of rotating thunderstorms. Some of the deadliest tornadoes on record occur in these areas; one such tornado in 1989 killed an estimated 1,300 people in Bangladesh's Manikganj District.

Before the tornado on March 31, the meteorological division of Nepal had issued a general forecast of possible rain for a large region, but it lacks the ability to determine the exact nature, strength or location of an incoming storm. The Indian Department of Meteorology had also issued a warning against strong winds in the neighbouring areas across the border. The rural farming communities hit by the storm live mostly in huts made of mud, grass and bamboo sticks. Electric transmission lines have been built to pass through residential areas or vice versa with little regard for safety and regulations. On the evening of the storm, most of the families were gathered in their homes and getting ready for dinner. Some people were still on the road trying to make it home.

== Events ==
On March 31, 2019, at around 07:45 pm local time (GMT +5:45), a supercell thunderstorm spawned a strong tornado in the Chitwan National Park which swept through the districts of Bara and Parsa in southern Nepal. Traveling along a 90 km (56 mi) path— 30 km (19 mi) of it visible from space—and reaching a maximum width of 200 m (660 ft), it ravaged many rural communities in the two districts for a half hour, wreaking havoc. Hardest-hit were the villages of Bharbalia, Parwanipur, and Pheta in Bara. A total of 1,273 homes were destroyed and a further 1,348 sustained damage. Many of these homes were poorly constructed, though multiple well-built masonry homes were completely destroyed as well. The majority of damage took place in Bara where 1,183 homes were destroyed. In some instances, concrete slabs were shifted 50 m (160 ft) and cars were blown away. Numerous trees were snapped and denuded, and a mosque was leveled. In Pheta rural municipality of Bara district alone, 26 people lost their lives from falling bricks and roofs, being buried under rubble or getting crushed by uprooted trees, electric poles or pylons. Many more were injured on the road when buses and private transports were blown or toppled over. Many families lost their food stock, clothes and other essentials in the rubble when their homes were destroyed. Official figures put the death toll at 28 (27 in Bara and 1 in Parsa) The actual numbers were reported to be as high as 50. The tornado also injured 1,176 people and a total of 3,291 families were reported affected. 1,505 hectares (3,720 acres) of crops were destroyed and 2,231 hectares (5,510 acres) were damaged. Dozens of livestock and 5,000 hens were killed. Total damage from the tornado and the parent thunderstorm reached Rs.90 million (US$800,000). Based on the damage, the tornado was estimated to have been an EF2 or EF3.

== Aftermath ==
At 10:37 pm, Prime minister KP Sharma Oli informed the world of the disaster via a tweet. He also informed that security personnel had already been deployed for rescue. On April 1 critically injured were airlifted to Kathmandu in Nepal Army's sky truck and M17 chopper. The security personnel, members of the civil service, medical personnel, volunteers, politicians and public office holders as well as organisations like Red Cross participated in search and rescue efforts. Medical teams from Nepal army, the Red Cross and local hospitals treated the injured.

The provincial government announced cash relief worth 300,000 rupees per casualty to the surviving family members of each dead. It also urged the federal government to announce a state of emergency in the affected areas. The prime minister inspected the damage by visiting the affected areas. The Government of Nepal declared a state of emergency on 1 April 2019. The Nepalese Army placed a helicopter on standby for relief efforts soon after the tornado; however, continued bad weather inhibited its use. Two ground units were deployed with aid and reached affected communities on the morning of 1 April. The Ministry of Home Affairs provided 468 sets of tents and tarpaulins and 4,138 units of clothing. The Nepal Red Cross Society (NRCS) distributed food and emergency items, with the Chitwan District chapter providing 500 kg (1,100 lb) of beaten rice, 150 kg (330 lb) of puffed rice, and 15 cartons of noodles. Bagmati Province provided Rs.10 million (US$90,000) to Province No. 2. The Nepalese Army established tent cities to accommodate displaced persons; however, living conditions became difficult with temperatures reaching 34.5 °C (94.1 °F) in the following weeks.

Local hospitals in Bara were overwhelmed with the number of injured persons and ran out of beds. Floor mattresses were used to accommodate additional victims. Kalaiya Hospital in Bara, which was understaffed and without power, received 354 patients; two spinal injury victims were transferred to Kathmandu and eight with head injuries were moved to Birganj. Mountain Heart Nepal established a clinic in Kalaiya and treated 160 people by 4 April. The Parsa chapter of the NRCS collected 300 pints of blood from donation centers to support injury treatment. Humanity & Inclusion distributed mobility aid to assist victims with rehabilitation. Doctors at the Epidemiology and Disease Control Division noted an increased risk of diseases with people left homeless, a lack of clean water, dead animals out in the open, and an abundance of mosquitos.

Numerous irregularities were observed in the distribution of relief materials to the affected villages. Consequently, District Administration Office of Bara had to enforce stringent measures. Many of the victims reported that they never received any relief while the influential people had hogged all the relief materials intended for them. Victims were critical of famous people flying into affected regions to take selfies of themselves distributing relief goods. The Pathlaiya-Birganj road became gridlocked with people bringing in aid and/or coming in to see the damage firsthand.

Members of the Canadian Centre for International Studies and Cooperation in Nepal assisted in damage assessment and the needs of victims. With assistance from the Government of Australia and the United Nations Population Fund, WOREC Nepal established psychosocial counseling for women in Devtaal, Parwanipur, Pheta and Suvarna.

== Scientific analysis ==
A team of researchers from The Small Earth Nepal and the country's Department of Hydrology and Meteorology (DHM) collaborated on a review of the damage. Reports of "spinning winds" from locals prompted Archana Shrestha, a meteorologist at the DHM, to investigate. The team conducted a four-day survey of affected towns, documenting and measuring damage. They also utilized imagery from the Sentinel-2 satellite and geolocated social media posts to compile a complete picture. Their results indicated a strong EF2 to EF3 tornado, with winds between 180 and 265 km/h (112 and 165 mph). With the help of forensic evidence, including satellite and drone images, as well as eye-witness accounts, a group of scientists concluded that the event was a tornado.

== See also ==
- 2019 in Nepal
