= Novostroyka, Vytegorsky District, Vologda Oblast =

Novostroyka Новостройка
- Settlement
- Location within Vologda Oblast Location within Russia
- Coordinates: 60°45′N 36°46′E
- Country: Russia
- Region: Vologda Oblast
- District: Vytegorsky District
- Time zone: UTC+3:00

Novostroyka (Russian: Новостройка) is a rural locality (a settlement) in Almozerskoye Rural Settlement, Vytegorsky District, Vologda Oblast, Russia. The population was 223 as of 2002. There are 9 streets.

== Geography ==
Novostroyka is located 46 km southeast of Vytegra (the district's administrative centre) by road. Volokov Most is the nearest rural locality.
