= Henry Fork, Virginia =

- Census-designated place
- Location within Virginia Location within the United States
- Coordinates: 36°57′53″N 79°52′25″W
- Country: United States
- State: Virginia
- County: Franklin

Area
  - Total: 2.73 sq mi (7.08 km^{2})
  - Land: 2.72 sq mi (7.05 km^{2})
  - Water: 0.0077 sq mi (0.02 km^{2})
- Elevation: 1,220 ft (370 m)

Population (2010)
  - Total: 1,234
  - Density: 450/sq mi (175/km^{2})
- Time zone: UTC−5 (Eastern (EST))
  - Summer (DST): UTC−4 (EDT)
- ZIP code: 24151
- FIPS code: 51-36445
- GNIS feature ID: 2629771

Henry Fork is an unincorporated community and census-designated place (CDP) in Franklin County, Virginia, United States, just south of Rocky Mount. As of the 2020 census, Henry Fork had a population of 1,120.

== Geography ==
The community is in central Franklin County, centered at the junction of the U.S. Route 220 Rocky Mount bypass with U.S. Route 220 Business (South Main Street), 3 miles (5 km) south of the center of Rocky Mount. US 220 leads north 27 miles (43 km) to Roanoke and south 24 miles (39 km) to Martinsville.

According to the U.S. Census Bureau, the Henry Fork CDP has a total area of 2.7 square miles (7.1 km^{2}), of which 0.01 square miles (0.02 km^{2}), or 0.34%, is water. The Pigg River, an east-flowing tributary of the Roanoke River, forms the northern edge of the CDP and its border with Rocky Mount.

== Demographics ==
Historical population
Census	Pop.	Note	%±
2010	1,234		—
2020	1,120		−9.2%
U.S. Decennial Census; 2010 2020

Henry Fork was first listed as a census designated place in the 2010 U.S. census.
