= Novostroyka =

Novostroyka Новостройка
- Settlement
- Location within Volgograd Oblast Location within Russia
- Coordinates: 48°40′N 45°18′E
- Country: Russia
- Region: Volgograd Oblast
- District: Leninsky District
- Time zone: UTC+4:00

Novostroyka (Russian: Новостройка) is a rural locality (a settlement) in Tsarevskoye Rural Settlement, Leninsky District, Volgograd Oblast, Russia. The population was 75 as of 2010. There are 2 streets.

Novostroyka is located on the left bank of the Kalguta River, 16 km southeast of Leninsk (the district's administrative centre) by road. Malyayevka is the nearest rural locality.
