= 2019 Vadodara flood =

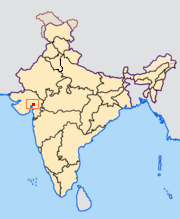
Location of Vadodara, Gujarat, India

Due to heavy rain in July–August 2019, the city of Vadodara and its administrative district in the Indian state of Gujarat were affected by severe flooding. On 31 July 2019, nearly 50 cm of rain fell on Vadodara within 12 hours, with 424mm recorded in one 6 hour period. As a result, the nearby Vishwamitri River rose to 1 metre below the danger line and the Ajwa dam overflowed, flooding the city.

== Consequences ==
The flood caused 8 deaths and the evacuation of more than 6000 people by the NDRF and SDRF. Train services were cancelled owing to water-logging, and the electricity supply was interrupted. On 1 August, Vadodara Airport was closed, GSRTC buses were cancelled and 69 trains passing through Vadodara Junction railway station were either cancelled or rerouted.

As water in the Vadodara receded, Crocodiles were seen on Vadodara roads causing harassment to people and stray dogs. 22 crocodiles were rescued from the residential areas of Vadodara within a week after flood.
