= 2019 Midwestern U.S. floods =

2019 disaster in the Midwestern United States

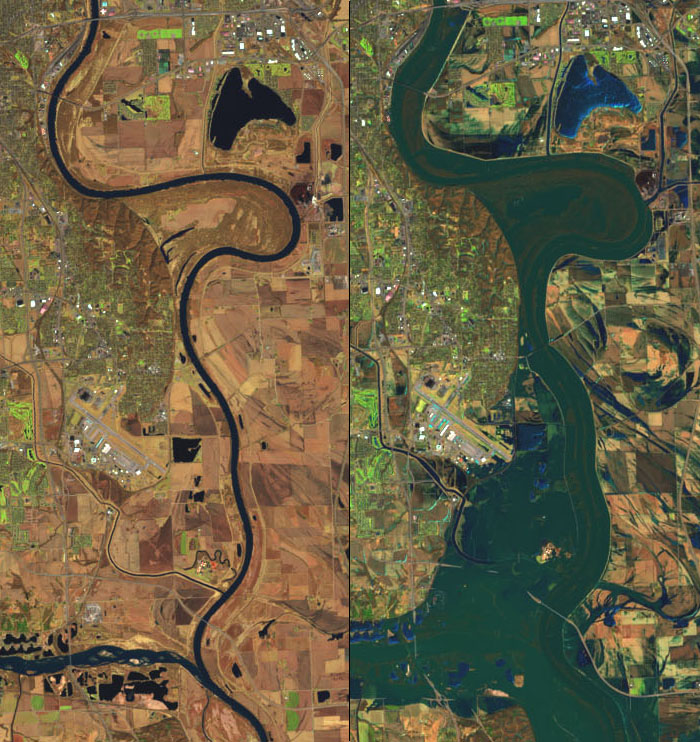
- March 2018 and March 2019 side-by-side comparison of the Omaha–Council Bluffs metropolitan area showing effects of flooding of the Platte and Missouri Rivers.
- Date: March 2019 – December 2019
- Location: Midwestern United States
- Deaths: 3
- Property damage: $2.9 billion ($1.6 billion in Iowa; $1.3 billion in Nebraska)

The Midwestern United States experienced major floods in the spring of 2019, primarily along the Missouri River and its tributaries in Nebraska, Missouri, South Dakota, Iowa, and Kansas. The Mississippi River also saw flooding, although starting later and ending earlier. The 2019 January-to-May period was the wettest on record for the U.S., with multiple severe weather outbreaks through May in the Midwest, High Plains, and South exacerbating the flooding and causing additional damage. Throughout late May and early June, rain in Iowa, Illinois, and Missouri caused every site on the Mississippi River to record a top-five crest. At least three people in Iowa and Nebraska died.

Nearly 14 million people in the midwestern and southern states were affected by the flooding, which the New York Times called "The Great Flood of 2019".

New record river levels were set in 42 different locations.

Although $12 billion in aid was made "available to farmers who lost money due to the trade war" the previous year, Reuters reported that the USDA had "no program to cover the catastrophic and largely uninsured stored-crop losses from the widespread flooding." In Nebraska, under the banner "Nebraska Strong", private fundraisers popped up across the state to help ease the financial strain, as well as offers to donate supplies, house livestock, or donate farming supplies lost. The largest private fundraiser came from Alex Stepanek of St. Paul, Nebraska, who raised $241,756 through a Facebook fundraiser. After seeing a post he created bringing attention to the devastation across the state go viral around the world, he created the fundraiser and by the following day had over $100,000. The money was distributed throughout 5 towns, 5 counties, four families who had loved ones die in the flood, and the largest chunk (1/3) went to the Nebraska Farm Bureau to go directly to agriculture and farmer needs.

At least 1 million acres of U.S. farmland, in nine major grain producing states, flooded.

On September 17, 2019, a third round of flooding along the Missouri River was considered likely, due to heavy rains of up to "four times what is normal in parts of Montana, North and South Dakota and Nebraska."

On October 28, 2019, it was predicted that the prolonged Missouri River flooding, which lasted as long as seven months in some locations, could continue all winter, with no end in sight.

On December 16, 2019, the prolonged Missouri River flooding in the Kansas City district was declared officially over.

== Causes ==
From January until early March, average temperatures in the Midwest remained in the low 20 to 30 average degree Fahrenheit range, with record snowfall in many areas, including the early March blizzard, up to three feet on the ground in some areas. In Nebraska, over the course of three days (March 11 – 13), temperatures rose to 60 degrees Fahrenheit, combined with 1.5 inches of rain. This quickly melted the snow, and the frozen ground was not able to absorb any meaningful amount, which led to unprecedented runoff into local streams and rivers. Saturated soils, combined with elevated river flow from the previous fall, led to severe, widespread flooding across the middle of the United States. Many of the rivers were still frozen over with a thick layer of ice, which the powerful flow of water broke up and dislodged, creating massive chunks of ice that traveled downstream, acting like a plow.

As of September 17, 2019, a third round of flooding along the Missouri River was considered likely, due to heavy rains of up to "four times what is normal in parts of Montana, North and South Dakota and Nebraska."

== Damage ==
=== Illinois ===
Illinois was affected by the flooding, and the Illinois National Guard was activated to assist with the efforts along the Illinois and Mississippi Rivers. The Illinois National Guard was released from flood fighting duties on July 29, 2019.

The river crest in Grafton was the fourth highest ever recorded. Cairo experienced over 156 days with waters above flood stage.

In March, record flooding occurred on segments of the Rock and Pecatonica Rivers, and minor to moderate flooding occurred on the Fox, Des Plaines, Kankakee and Illinois Rivers. The Pecatonica River, which has flooded seven times since May 2017, flooded again in October, along with other Chicago area rivers including the Fox River and the Rock River. Freeport is seeking funding to buy out flood-prone homes.

=== Iowa ===
Iowa was also affected by heavy rains and flooding. Iowa Governor Kim Reynolds signed an emergency disaster proclamation March 14. One man was killed in Iowa.

Parts of all nine state parks were closed. Standing water from the spring floods was still present near Iowa roads in mid-September.

Governor Reynolds estimated the damage at $1.6 billion, a state record. Reynolds asked the president to declare a disaster in 67 counties.

A website was established, 2019 Iowa Floods, to help residents apply for assistance, report hazards, check on levee and road status, and access areas with closed roads.

==== Western Iowa ====
Western Iowa suffered severe impacts, especially in the Missouri River Valley south of Council Bluffs. There, at least 30 levee failures flooded towns and highways.

In Hamburg, two-thirds of the town was underwater when the bomb cyclone hit. The town lost sewage and gas services, according to city officials. The town's levee, which was in need of repair, was breached. Residents had been unable to raise the $5 million for necessary repairs before the storm, despite releasing a 2012 flash mob YouTube video of residents dancing on Main Street, singing "Levee. Levee. Save us from the river." to the tune of Creedence Clearwater Revival's "Proud Mary."

Floodwaters damaged the water treatment plant in Glenwood. On April 5, the city of Glenwood was still "trucking in more than 6,000-gallon tanks of water to provide the roughly 275,000 gallons its residents ... [were] using each day."

On April 11, hundreds of homes in Fremont County were still evacuated, and road closures remained in place. Satellite images from the Weather Channel showed the town of Bartlett almost completely underwater. Fremont County farmers lost an estimated "390,000 bushels of stored soybeans and about 1.2 million bushels of stored corn."

One homeowner in McPaul had to wait 180 days for floodwater to drain; the home flooded again five days later. The McPaul exit off of Interstate 29 was still closed in early October, and standing water was visible.

43% of flooded homeowners in Pacific Junction, other parts of rural Mills County, and Hamburg expressed interest in federal buyouts, which have a partial funding match from the Iowa Flood Mitigation Board.

==== Eastern Iowa ====
In Eastern Iowa, the Quad Cities spent 96 days with the Mississippi above flood stage levels. In Burlington, the Mississippi rose above its banks for more than 104 days, surpassing its 1993 record.

The Mississippi River Cities and Towns Initiative (MRCTI) estimated over 2 billion dollars in flood damage.

==== Road closures ====
Interstate 29 was closed in March, and again in May, from Council Bluffs to the Missouri state border and from there to St. Joseph, Missouri, with portions of the interstate under 15 ft (4.6 m) of water.

On September 20, sections of Interstate-680 and Interstate 29 were once again closed due to Missouri River flooding. Some of the standing water by Iowa roads had been there since the spring floods.

=== Missouri ===
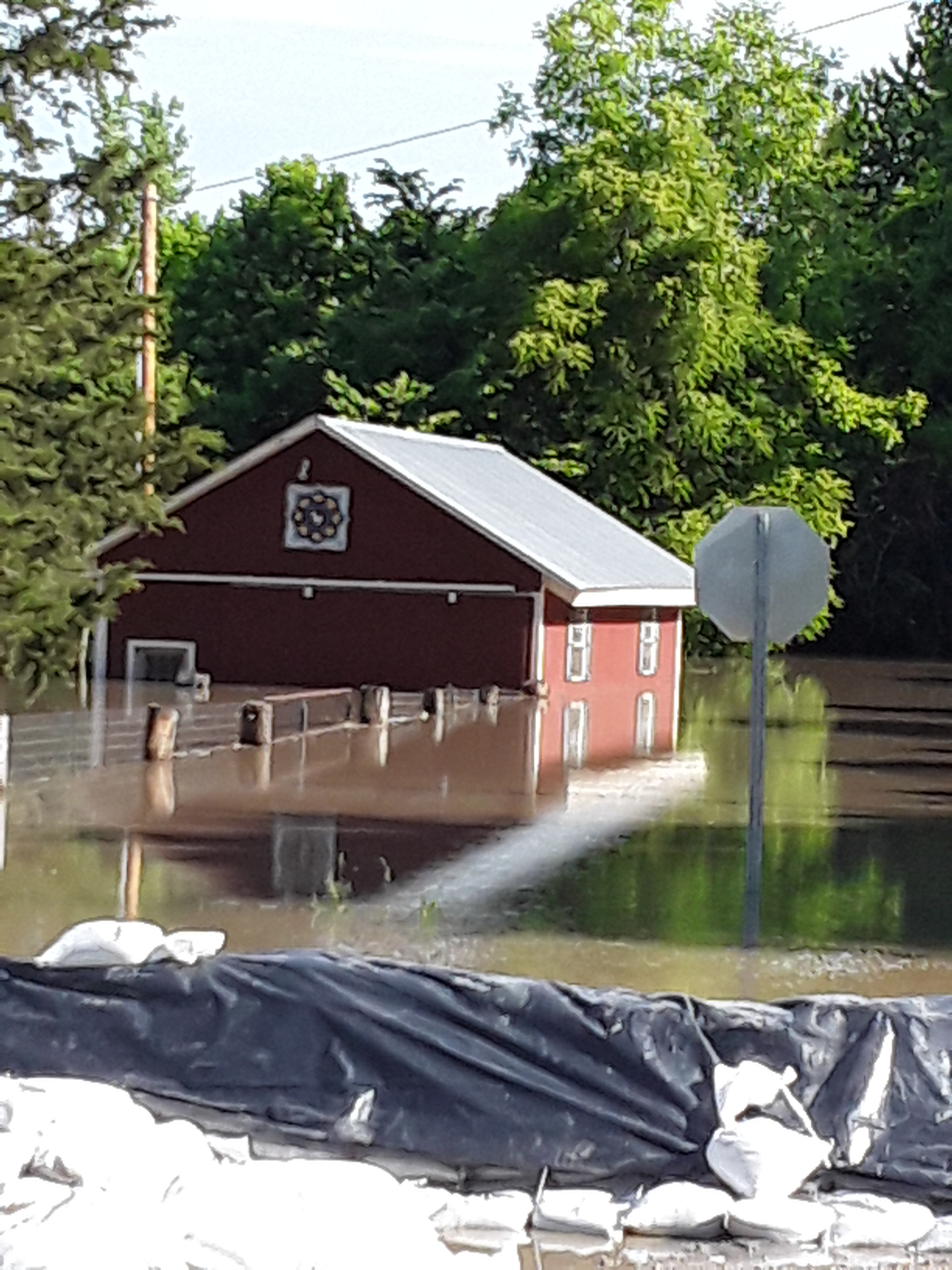
Picture taken in Rocheport, Missouri, during the flood of 2019.

The entire community of Craig, as well as parts of St. Joseph, were evacuated, and portions of Interstate 29 were under 15 feet (4.6 metres) of water. On March 21, a state of emergency was issued by Governor Mike Parson, who said:

The rising floodwaters are affecting more Missouri communities and farms, closing more roads and threatening levees, water treatment plants and other critical infrastructure. We will continue to work closely with our local partners to assess needs and provide resources to help as Missourians continue this flood fight and as we work to assist one another.

In Holt County, about 30,000 acres (12,140 hectares) of the 95,000 acres (38,445 hectares) that flooded in spring 2019 were still underwater in late October, leading to concerns of the floodwater freezing during the winter. Corning had flooded more than once by November.

=== Nebraska ===
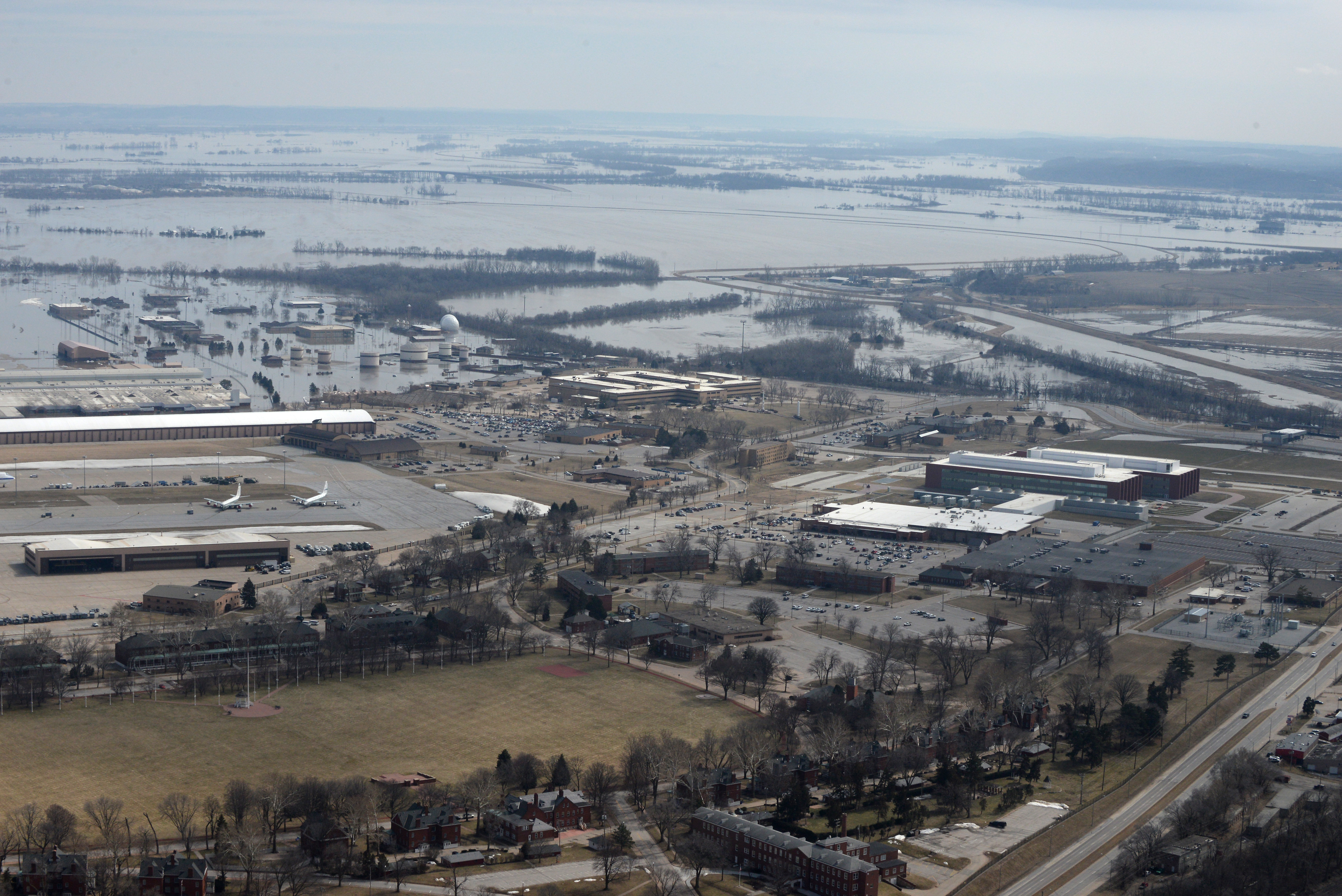
Aerial view of Offutt Air Force Base in Nebraska, flooded

On March 14, 2019, the Spencer Dam on the Niobrara River collapsed, releasing an eleven-foot wall of water. The unrestrained flooding which followed destroyed three bridges downstream, including the Highway 281 bridge.

In east central Nebraska, residents along the flooded Missouri, Platte and Elkhorn Rivers were forced to evacuate as some locals experienced all-time record flooding. The city of Norfolk evacuated a third of its residents. The Platte and Elkhorn Rivers had overflowed their levees in the greater Omaha region, and some communities were put under a mandatory evacuation order. The Platte River at numerous sites had reached flooding of "historical proportions" with some sites breaking all-time record flood levels by as much as 5 feet (1.5 m). By March 15, access to the city of Fremont was blocked due to all roads being closed in and out of the city. This remained the case days later, with national guard military convoys being set up to get food and other supplies into the city.

Offutt Air Force Base had extensive flooding from the Missouri River, inundating 30 buildings and 3,000 ft (910 m) of their only runway. The base received damage that was said to "not be repaired for months", which caused some events to be moved back. Camp Ashland, one of the Nebraska National Guard's main training sites, was also extensively damaged, with 51 of 62 buildings affected. Military representatives stated that the flooding is the worst that the camp has seen in its history, including a serious flood from 2015 that cost 3.7 million in repairs. It took several months to clean and repair the facility to support scaled back operations, with more extensive rebuilding efforts ongoing for the next several years.

Thirty of the one hundred homes in Lynch were destroyed by the flood.

On March 18, Nebraska governor Pete Ricketts declared a state of emergency and stated that the floods caused "[t]he most extensive damage our state has ever experienced."

Flood damage in Nebraska has been estimated at over $1.3 billion, including "$449 million in damage to roads, levees and other infrastructure." Twenty-seven bridges were damaged.

Agricultural damages included "$440 million in crop losses; and $400 million in cattle losses." Livestock losses included seven hundred hogs that were drowned on a farm near Fremont. Volunteers from Ohio's Rural America Relief mounted a 10 truck convoy to North Bend with supplies for farm cleanup, "including four Gators to access the saturated fields." After the 2011 Missouri River Flood, "it took years for some affected fields to be cleaned of debris and sand," according to a Nebraska DOT official." Nebraska's agronomists stress the importance of choosing appropriate cover crops for flooded fields which can not be replanted.

The University of Nebraska announced Flood Recovery Serviceships with the Nebraska Disaster Recovery Service Corps, sending 24 students to affected communities.

=== North Dakota ===
Widespread spring flooding "damaged homes, public infrastructure, hundreds of roads and thousands of acres of farmland in 19 counties in western, south central and eastern North Dakota," and resulted in $16.6 million in federal funds and state loans.

On October 21, 2019, North Dakota Governor Doug Burgum declared a statewide flood emergency, as "unprecedented fall flooding" and rising river levels threatened the harvest. North Dakota Agricultural Commissioner Doug Goehring said, "We probably have in western Minnesota and North Dakota about two billion dollars worth of soybeans that are sitting in water or at least in conditions which may not allow producers to get out there and get them anytime soon."

=== South Dakota ===
In March 2019, a powerful blizzard dumped up to two feet of snow in South Dakota, followed by rapidly warming temperatures that left flooding in its wake. Some residents of the Pine Ridge Indian Reservation were stranded for days, and about 8,000 people lost drinking water. High water on the Moreau River prompted evacuations on the Cheyenne River Indian Reservation. Pennington County approved a local disaster declaration as a result of a bridge collapse and other damage.

In September 2019, "heavy rains dumped more than four times what is normal in parts of Montana, North and South Dakota and Nebraska."

Between September 12–15, 2019, the Big Sioux River overflowed its banks. Three blocks of Dell Rapids, South Dakota were flooded, and up to a dozen homes damaged. Bridges were washed out in Mitchell, which received 7 inches of rain in one night. Interstate 90 was shut down between Mitchell and Sioux Falls. Baltic, South Dakota, was only accessible via Highway 115. Non-residents were urged to avoid Dell Rapids, Baltic, and Renner until the floods cleared. In Madison, "about 30 people had to be rescued by boats and heavy equipment," after nine inches of rain fell in just two days. Schools in Spencer were closed for two days, and streets were submerged.

On September 17, residents of Dakota Dunes, a development sandwiched between the Big Sioux River and the Missouri River, were encouraged to evacuate as a precaution due to heavy rains, with peak waters expected the following Tuesday."

== See also ==
- 2019 Arkansas River floods
- Mississippi River floods of 2019
- Great Flood of 1993
