= Lake Howard, Alabama =

Unincorporated community in Alabama, United States

- Unincorporated community
- Location within Alabama Location within the United States
- Coordinates: 34°30′25″N 85°36′42″W
- Country: United States
- State: Alabama
- County: DeKalb
- Elevation: 1,470 ft (450 m)
- Time zone: UTC-6 (Central (CST))
  - Summer (DST): UTC-5 (CDT)
- Area code: 256
- GNIS feature ID: 156574

Lake Howard is an unincorporated community in DeKalb County, Alabama, United States, located northeast of Fort Payne and south of Valley Head.
