= Whiton =

Whiton may refer to:

== Surname ==
- Edward V. Whiton (1805–1859), American lawyer, jurist, and Wisconsin pioneer
- Emelyn Whiton (1916–1962), American sailor
- Herman Whiton (1904–1967), American sailor
- Joseph Whiton (1759–1828), American politician and Revolutionary War soldier

== Places ==
- Whiton, Alabama
- Whiton, Maryland
