= Alpine, Alabama =

Alpine, Alabama may refer to:

- Alpine, DeKalb County, Alabama, an unincorporated community in DeKalb County, Alabama
- Alpine, Talladega County, Alabama, an unincorporated community in Talladega County, Alabama
