= Guest, Alabama =

Unincorporated community in Alabama, United States

- Unincorporated community
- Location within Alabama
- Coordinates: 34°25′27″N 85°52′24″W
- Country: United States
- State: Alabama
- County: DeKalb
- Elevation: 1,099 ft (335 m)
- Time zone: UTC-6 (Central (CST))
  - Summer (DST): UTC-5 (CDT)
- Area code: 256

Guest is an unincorporated community in DeKalb County, Alabama, United States.

== History ==
The community was most likely named for the local Guest family. A post office called Guest was established in 1892, and remained in operation until it was discontinued in 1905.
