= Rawlingsville, Alabama =

- Unincorporated community
- Location within Alabama
- Coordinates: 34°27′40″N 85°41′55″W
- Country: United States
- State: Alabama
- County: DeKalb
- Elevation: 958 ft (292 m)
- Time zone: UTC-6 (Central (CST))
  - Summer (DST): UTC-5 (CDT)
- Area code: 256
- GNIS feature ID: 155417

Rawlingsville, also known as Crystal Lake or Hollemans Station, was the first county seat of DeKalb County, Alabama, United States. It served as such from 1835 for a short time until the county seat was moved to Bootsville. Rawlingsville was located within the boundaries of the present city of Fort Payne but has long since ceased to exist as a recognized community.
