= Bootsville, Alabama =

- Ghost town
- Location within Alabama
- Coordinates: 34°25′45″N 85°48′40″W
- Country: United States
- State: Alabama
- County: DeKalb
- Elevation: 869 ft (265 m)
- Time zone: UTC-6 (Central (CST))
  - Summer (DST): UTC-5 (CDT)
- Area code: 256
- GNIS feature ID: 150654

Bootsville is a ghost town in the Sand Valley area of central DeKalb County, Alabama, United States. It was located roughly five miles west-southwest of Fort Payne, placing it near the present-day intersection of County Road 458 and County Road 461.

== History ==
Though it once held the distinction of being the seat of DeKalb County, very little is known about Bootsville. In 1837, the county seat moved to the town from Rawlingsville, making it the county's second seat of justice. However, Bootsville was only the county seat for a matter of months before the town of Camden assumed this role in 1838. This was around the time the county was still being organized. Bootsville was named for an Indian chief named "Boots", who lived in the vicinity.
