= Cartersville, Alabama =

Unincorporated community in Alabama, United States

- Unincorporated community
- Location within Alabama
- Coordinates: 34°45′30″N 85°36′15″W
- Country: United States
- State: Alabama
- County: DeKalb
- Elevation: 1,644 ft (501 m)
- Time zone: UTC-6 (Central (CST))
  - Summer (DST): UTC-5 (CDT)
- Area code: 256

Cartersville, also known as Sandrock or Scott, is an unincorporated community in DeKalb County, in the U.S. state of Alabama.

== History ==
A post office operated under the name Scott from 1890 to 1909 and under the name Sandrock from 1909 to 1914.

The Deer Head Cove Church in Cartersville is listed on the Alabama Register of Landmarks and Heritage.
