= DeKalb County, Alabama =

County in Alabama, United States

- County
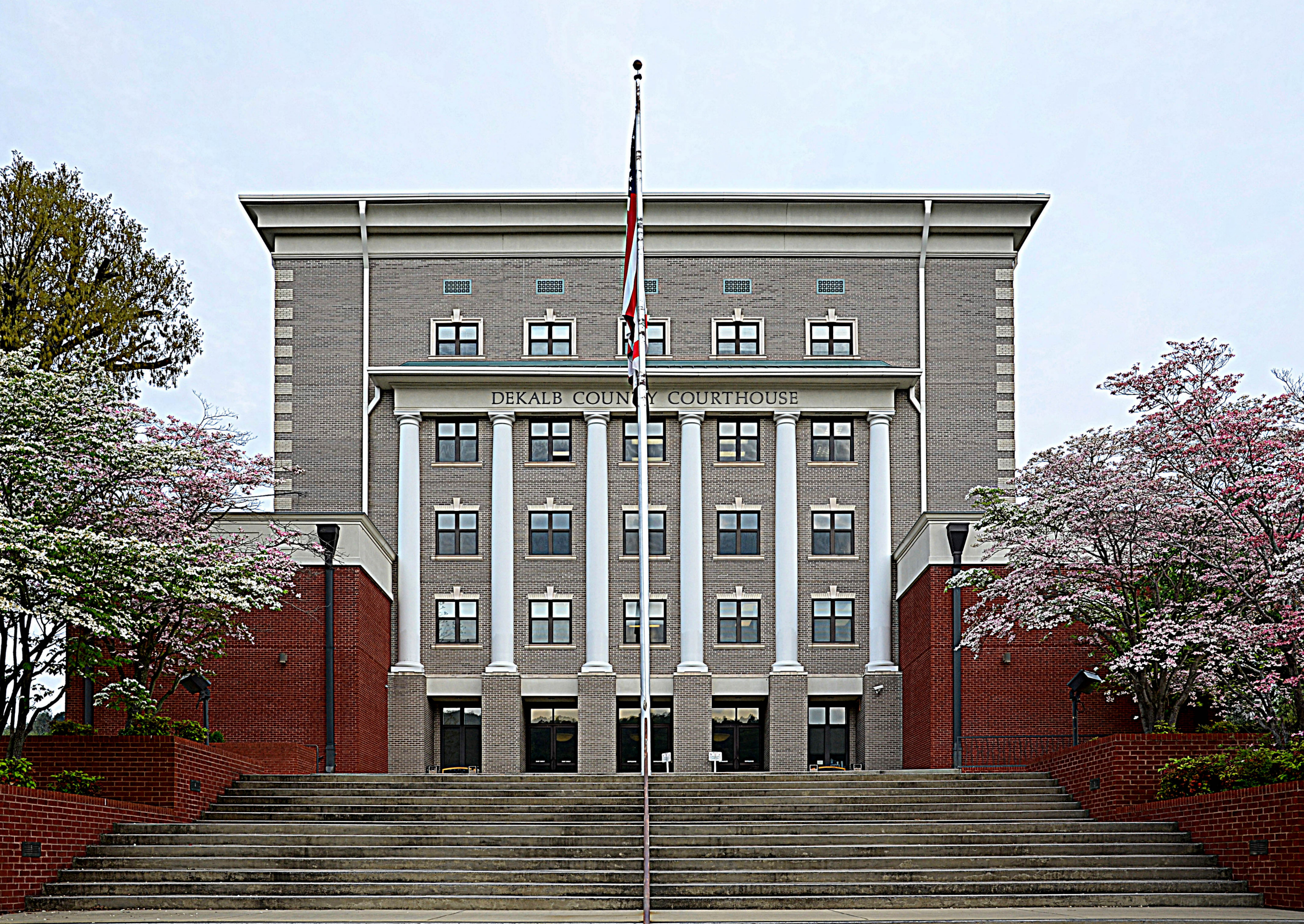
- DeKalb County Courthouse in Fort Payne

- Seal

- Location within the U.S. state of Alabama
- Coordinates: 34°27′26″N 85°48′24″W
- Country: United States
- State: Alabama
- Founded: January 9, 1836
- Named for: Johann de Kalb
- Seat: Fort Payne
- Largest city: Fort Payne

Area
  - Total: 779 sq mi (2,020 km^{2})
  - Land: 777 sq mi (2,010 km^{2})
  - Water: 1.6 sq mi (4.1 km^{2}) 0.2%

Population (2020)
  - Total: 71,608
  - Estimate (2025): 74,085 ▲
  - Density: 92.2/sq mi (35.6/km^{2})
- Time zone: UTC−6 (Central)
  - Summer (DST): UTC−5 (CDT)
- Congressional district: 4th
- Website: www.dekalbcountyal.us
- County Number 28 on Alabama License Plates

DeKalb County is a county in the northeastern part of the U.S. state of Alabama. As of the 2020 census, the population was 71,608. Its county seat is Fort Payne, and it is named after Major General Baron Johann de Kalb. DeKalb County is part of the Huntsville-Decatur-Albertville, AL Combined Statistical Area.

== History ==
DeKalb County was created by the Alabama legislature on January 9, 1836, from land ceded under duress to the Federal government by the Cherokee Nation prior to their forced removal to Indian Territory west of the Mississippi River.

The county was named for Major General Baron Johann de Kalb, a hero of the American Revolution.

The city of Fort Payne, now the county seat, developed around a fort of the same name, built in the 1830s to intern Cherokee of the region prior to their removal.

In the early 19th century, Sequoyah, the Cherokee man who independently created the Cherokee syllabary, a written system for his language, lived in this area. He had been born in a Cherokee town in Tennessee and migrated here in the early 1800s. His work enabled the Cherokee to publish the first Native American newspaper, The Phoenix, which they produced in Cherokee and English.

On the whole, DeKalb County is a dry county in terms of alcohol sales and consumption. In 2005, the city of Fort Payne passed a law to authorize the legal sale of alcohol. Rainsville, Collinsville, and Henagar later also allowed alcohol sales.

== 21st-century natural events ==
The county's eastern edge, along the state line, was the epicenter of an earthquake on April 29, 2003, measuring 4.6 on the moment magnitude scale. Power was knocked out in the area, mirrors and pictures thrown to the floor, foundations cracked, and one chimney fell to the ground. The unusual earthquake for this region was felt over a significant portion of the southeastern states, including quite strongly in northeastern Alabama and neighboring northern Georgia, and nearby eastern Tennessee (especially near Chattanooga). It was also felt slightly in western upstate South Carolina, far west-southwestern North Carolina, south and southeastern Kentucky, and east-northeastern Mississippi.

DeKalb County had one of the highest death tolls in Alabama during a massive tornadic system on April 27, 2011, the 2011 Super Outbreak. A total of 31 deaths were reported in the county, 25 of them being a result of the 2011 Rainsville tornado, the last EF5 of the outbreak..

== Geography ==
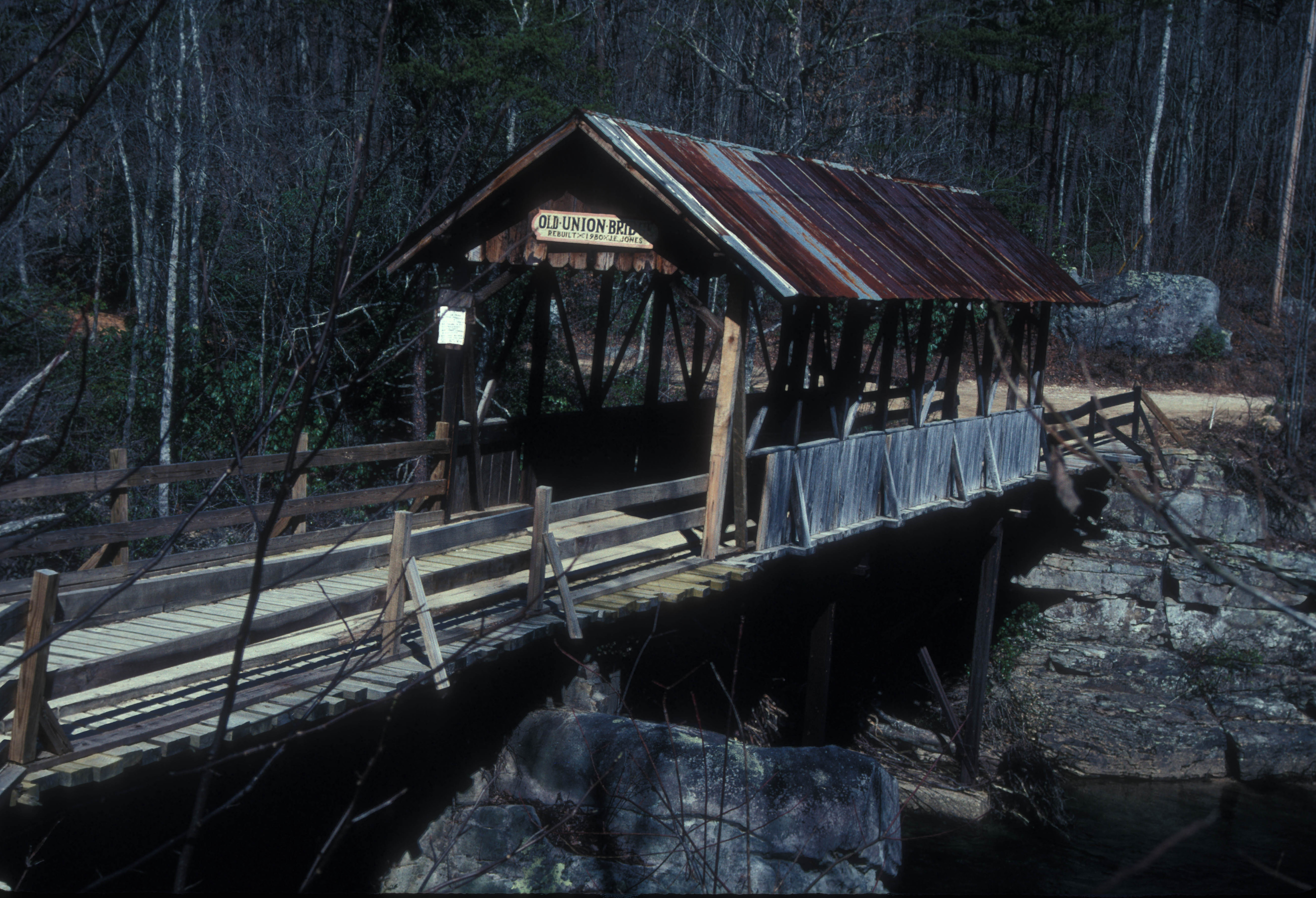
The "Old Union" or "Tallahatchie" covered bridge crosses the Little River.

According to the United States Census Bureau, the county has a total area of 779 square miles (2,020 km^{2}), of which 777 square miles (2,010 km^{2}) is land and 1.6 square miles (4.1 km^{2}) (0.2%) is water.

=== Adjacent counties ===
- Jackson County – north
- Dade County, Georgia – northeast (EST)
- Walker County, Georgia – east (EST)
- Chattooga County, Georgia – east (EST)
- Cherokee County – southeast
- Etowah County – south
- Marshall County – west

=== National protected area ===
- Little River Canyon National Preserve (part)

== Demographics ==
Historical population
| Census | Pop. | Note | %± |
|---|---|---|---|
| 1840 | 5,929 | | — |
| 1850 | 8,245 | | 39.1% |
| 1860 | 10,705 | | 29.8% |
| 1870 | 7,126 | | −33.4% |
| 1880 | 12,675 | | 77.9% |
| 1890 | 21,106 | | 66.5% |
| 1900 | 23,558 | | 11.6% |
| 1910 | 28,261 | | 20.0% |
| 1920 | 34,426 | | 21.8% |
| 1930 | 40,104 | | 16.5% |
| 1940 | 43,075 | | 7.4% |
| 1950 | 45,048 | | 4.6% |
| 1960 | 41,417 | | −8.1% |
| 1970 | 41,981 | | 1.4% |
| 1980 | 53,658 | | 27.8% |
| 1990 | 54,651 | | 1.9% |
| 2000 | 64,452 | | 17.9% |
| 2010 | 71,109 | | 10.3% |
| 2020 | 71,608 | | 0.7% |
| 2025 (est.) | 74,085 | ▲ | 3.5% |
U.S. Decennial Census; 1790–1960 1900–1990; 1990–2000 2010–2020

=== Racial and ethnic composition ===
DeKalb County, Alabama – Racial and ethnic composition Note: the US Census treats Hispanic/Latino as an ethnic category. This table excludes Latinos from the racial categories and assigns them to a separate category. Hispanics/Latinos may be of any race.
| Race / Ethnicity (NH = Non-Hispanic) | Pop 1980 | Pop 1990 | Pop 2000 | Pop 2010 | Pop 2020 | % 1980 | % 1990 | % 2000 | % 2010 | % 2020 |
|---|---|---|---|---|---|---|---|---|---|---|
| White alone (NH) | 52,308 | 52,854 | 58,436 | 57,997 | 54,529 | 97.48% | 96.71% | 90.67% | 81.56% | 76.15% |
| Black or African American alone (NH) | 927 | 1,023 | 1,064 | 1,029 | 1,019 | 1.73% | 1.87% | 1.65% | 1.45% | 1.42% |
| Native American or Alaska Native alone (NH) | 90 | 473 | 478 | 865 | 715 | 0.17% | 0.87% | 0.74% | 1.22% | 1.00% |
| Asian alone (NH) | 44 | 76 | 105 | 166 | 237 | 0.08% | 0.14% | 0.16% | 0.23% | 0.33% |
| Native Hawaiian or Pacific Islander alone (NH) | x | x | 13 | 35 | 16 | x | x | 0.02% | 0.05% | 0.02% |
| Other race alone (NH) | 8 | 10 | 11 | 41 | 86 | 0.01% | 0.02% | 0.02% | 0.06% | 0.12% |
| Mixed race or Multiracial (NH) | x | x | 767 | 1,286 | 3,262 | x | x | 1.19% | 1.81% | 4.56% |
| Hispanic or Latino (any race) | 281 | 215 | 3,578 | 9,690 | 11,744 | 0.52% | 0.39% | 5.55% | 13.63% | 16.40% |
| Total | 53,658 | 54,651 | 64,452 | 71,109 | 71,608 | 100.00% | 100.00% | 100.00% | 100.00% | 100.00% |

=== 2020 census ===
As of the 2020 census, the county had a population of 71,608. The median age was 39.7 years. 24.7% of residents were under the age of 18 and 17.6% of residents were 65 years of age or older. For every 100 females there were 97.5 males, and for every 100 females age 18 and over there were 95.0 males age 18 and over.

The racial makeup of the county was 78.8% White, 1.5% Black or African American, 2.8% American Indian and Alaska Native, 0.4% Asian, 0.0% Native Hawaiian and Pacific Islander, 10.0% from some other race, and 6.6% from two or more races. Hispanic or Latino residents of any race comprised 16.4% of the population.

11.7% of residents lived in urban areas, while 88.3% lived in rural areas.

There were 27,145 households in the county, of which 32.8% had children under the age of 18 living with them and 25.4% had a female householder with no spouse or partner present. About 25.9% of all households were made up of individuals and 12.4% had someone living alone who was 65 years of age or older.

There were 30,584 housing units, of which 11.2% were vacant. Among occupied housing units, 74.0% were owner-occupied and 26.0% were renter-occupied. The homeowner vacancy rate was 1.3% and the rental vacancy rate was 7.1%.

=== 2010 census ===
As of the census of 2010, there were 71,109 people, 26,842 households, and 19,361 families living in the county. The population density was 92 people per square mile (36 people/km^{2}). There were 31,109 housing units at an average density of 39.9 units per square mile (15.4 units/km^{2}). The racial makeup of the county was 84.5% White (non-Hispanic), 1.5% Black or African American, 1.4% Native American, 0.3% Asian, 0.2% Pacific Islander, 9.9% from other races, and 2.2% from two or more races. 13.6% of the population were Hispanic or Latino of any race.

=== 2000 census ===
As of the census of 2000, there were 64,452 people, 25,113 households, and 18,432 families living in the county. The population density was 83 people per square mile (32 people/km^{2}). There were 28,051 housing units at an average density of 36 units per square mile (14 units/km^{2}). The racial makeup of the county was 92.55% White (non-Hispanic), 1.68% Black or African American, 0.80% Native American, 0.19% Asian, 0.06% Pacific Islander, 3.10% from other races, and 1.62% from two or more races. 5.55% of the population were Hispanic or Latino of any race.

According to the census of 2000, the largest ancestry groups in DeKalb County were English 78.31%, Scotch-Irish 8.29%, Scottish 3.33%, Irish 3.31%, Welsh 1.22%, and African 1.68%.

== Transportation ==
=== Major highways ===
- Interstate 59
- U.S. Route 11 / State Route 7 (unsigned)
- State Route 35
- State Route 40
- State Route 68
- State Route 75
- State Route 117
- State Route 168
- State Route 176
- State Route 227

=== Rail ===
- Norfolk Southern Railway

== Government ==
DeKalb County is strongly Republican. Eighty-four percent of its voters supported Donald Trump in 2020, and no Democrat has carried it since Southerner Jimmy Carter did so in 1976. Populist appeal in the county during the period of "Redemption" meant that even during the "Solid South" era DeKalb County sometimes supported victorious Republican presidential candidates, as it did during the three Republican landslides of the 1920s.

United States presidential election results for DeKalb County, Alabama
| Year | Republican | | Democratic | | Third party(ies) | |
| Year | No. | % | No. | % | No. | % |
|---|---|---|---|---|---|---|
| 1836 | 42 | 10.00% | 378 | 90.00% | 0 | 0.00% |
| 1840 | 157 | 16.92% | 771 | 83.08% | 0 | 0.00% |
| 1844 | 207 | 22.82% | 700 | 77.18% | 0 | 0.00% |
| 1848 | 257 | 28.34% | 650 | 71.66% | 0 | 0.00% |
| 1852 | 139 | 21.72% | 501 | 78.28% | 0 | 0.00% |
| 1856 | 0 | 0.00% | 900 | 87.38% | 130 | 12.62% |
| 1860 | 0 | 0.00% | 202 | 16.10% | 1,053 | 83.90% |
| 1868 | 492 | 57.34% | 360 | 41.96% | 6 | 0.70% |
| 1872 | 585 | 50.39% | 576 | 49.61% | 0 | 0.00% |
| 1876 | 447 | 31.17% | 987 | 68.83% | 0 | 0.00% |
| 1880 | 252 | 24.93% | 759 | 75.07% | 0 | 0.00% |
| 1884 | 465 | 30.16% | 1,077 | 69.84% | 0 | 0.00% |
| 1888 | 593 | 30.63% | 1,326 | 68.49% | 17 | 0.88% |
| 1892 | 5 | 0.16% | 1,868 | 61.01% | 1,189 | 38.83% |
| 1896 | 1,446 | 46.56% | 1,586 | 51.06% | 74 | 2.38% |
| 1900 | 1,735 | 46.80% | 1,873 | 50.53% | 99 | 2.67% |
| 1904 | 1,237 | 40.31% | 1,716 | 55.91% | 116 | 3.78% |
| 1908 | 1,103 | 43.15% | 1,395 | 54.58% | 58 | 2.27% |
| 1912 | 492 | 19.49% | 1,379 | 54.61% | 654 | 25.90% |
| 1916 | 1,190 | 39.35% | 1,787 | 59.09% | 47 | 1.55% |
| 1920 | 4,852 | 55.17% | 3,894 | 44.28% | 49 | 0.56% |
| 1924 | 3,434 | 53.35% | 3,003 | 46.65% | 0 | 0.00% |
| 1928 | 5,761 | 59.27% | 3,957 | 40.71% | 2 | 0.02% |
| 1932 | 3,496 | 44.88% | 4,217 | 54.13% | 77 | 0.99% |
| 1936 | 4,620 | 42.92% | 6,121 | 56.87% | 23 | 0.21% |
| 1940 | 2,810 | 34.02% | 5,432 | 65.77% | 17 | 0.21% |
| 1944 | 2,627 | 37.52% | 4,366 | 62.35% | 9 | 0.13% |
| 1948 | 2,743 | 43.31% | 0 | 0.00% | 3,590 | 56.69% |
| 1952 | 3,997 | 43.37% | 5,209 | 56.52% | 11 | 0.12% |
| 1956 | 5,684 | 49.56% | 5,768 | 50.30% | 16 | 0.14% |
| 1960 | 5,585 | 48.82% | 5,844 | 51.08% | 12 | 0.10% |
| 1964 | 6,746 | 57.69% | 0 | 0.00% | 4,948 | 42.31% |
| 1968 | 5,314 | 35.76% | 1,274 | 8.57% | 8,271 | 55.66% |
| 1972 | 9,434 | 71.27% | 3,759 | 28.40% | 44 | 0.33% |
| 1976 | 6,597 | 40.14% | 9,759 | 59.37% | 81 | 0.49% |
| 1980 | 9,673 | 51.75% | 8,820 | 47.19% | 197 | 1.05% |
| 1984 | 12,098 | 62.53% | 7,212 | 37.27% | 39 | 0.20% |
| 1988 | 11,478 | 60.60% | 7,333 | 38.72% | 129 | 0.68% |
| 1992 | 10,519 | 48.73% | 8,245 | 38.20% | 2,821 | 13.07% |
| 1996 | 9,823 | 54.14% | 6,544 | 36.07% | 1,776 | 9.79% |
| 2000 | 12,827 | 63.23% | 7,056 | 34.78% | 402 | 1.98% |
| 2004 | 16,904 | 69.94% | 7,092 | 29.34% | 173 | 0.72% |
| 2008 | 17,957 | 74.77% | 5,658 | 23.56% | 400 | 1.67% |
| 2012 | 18,331 | 76.54% | 5,239 | 21.87% | 380 | 1.59% |
| 2016 | 21,405 | 82.88% | 3,622 | 14.02% | 799 | 3.09% |
| 2020 | 24,767 | 84.37% | 4,281 | 14.58% | 308 | 1.05% |
| 2024 | 25,633 | 86.42% | 3,758 | 12.67% | 269 | 0.91% |

United States Senate election results for DeKalb County, Alabama2
| Year | Republican | | Democratic | | Third party(ies) | |
| Year | No. | % | No. | % | No. | % |
|---|---|---|---|---|---|---|
| 2020 | 23,940 | 81.86% | 5,253 | 17.96% | 53 | 0.18% |

United States Senate election results for DeKalb County, Alabama3
| Year | Republican | | Democratic | | Third party(ies) | |
| Year | No. | % | No. | % | No. | % |
|---|---|---|---|---|---|---|
| 2022 | 15,200 | 88.71% | 1,679 | 9.80% | 255 | 1.49% |

Alabama Gubernatorial election results for DeKalb County
| Year | Republican | | Democratic | | Third party(ies) | |
| Year | No. | % | No. | % | No. | % |
|---|---|---|---|---|---|---|
| 2022 | 15,227 | 88.88% | 1,471 | 8.59% | 435 | 2.54% |

== Communities ==
=== Cities ===
- Fort Payne (county seat)
- Henagar
- Rainsville

=== Towns ===
- Collinsville (partly in Cherokee County)
- Crossville
- Fyffe
- Geraldine
- Hammondville
- Ider
- Kilpatrick
- Lakeview
- Mentone
- Pine Ridge
- Powell
- Sand Rock (mostly in Cherokee County)
- Shiloh
- Sylvania
- Valley Head

=== Unincorporated communities ===
- Adamsburg
- Alpine
- Aroney
- Beaty Crossroads
- Cartersville
- Chigger Hill
- Dawson
- Dog Town
- Grove Oak
- Guest
- Hopewell
- Lake Howard
- Loveless
- Sulphur Springs
- Ten Broeck
- Whiton

=== Ghost towns ===
- Battelle
- Bootsville
- Rawlingsville

== See also ==
- DeKalb County Schools
- National Register of Historic Places listings in DeKalb County, Alabama
- Properties on the Alabama Register of Landmarks and Heritage in DeKalb County, Alabama
