= March 2019 North American blizzard =

Colorado Low storm

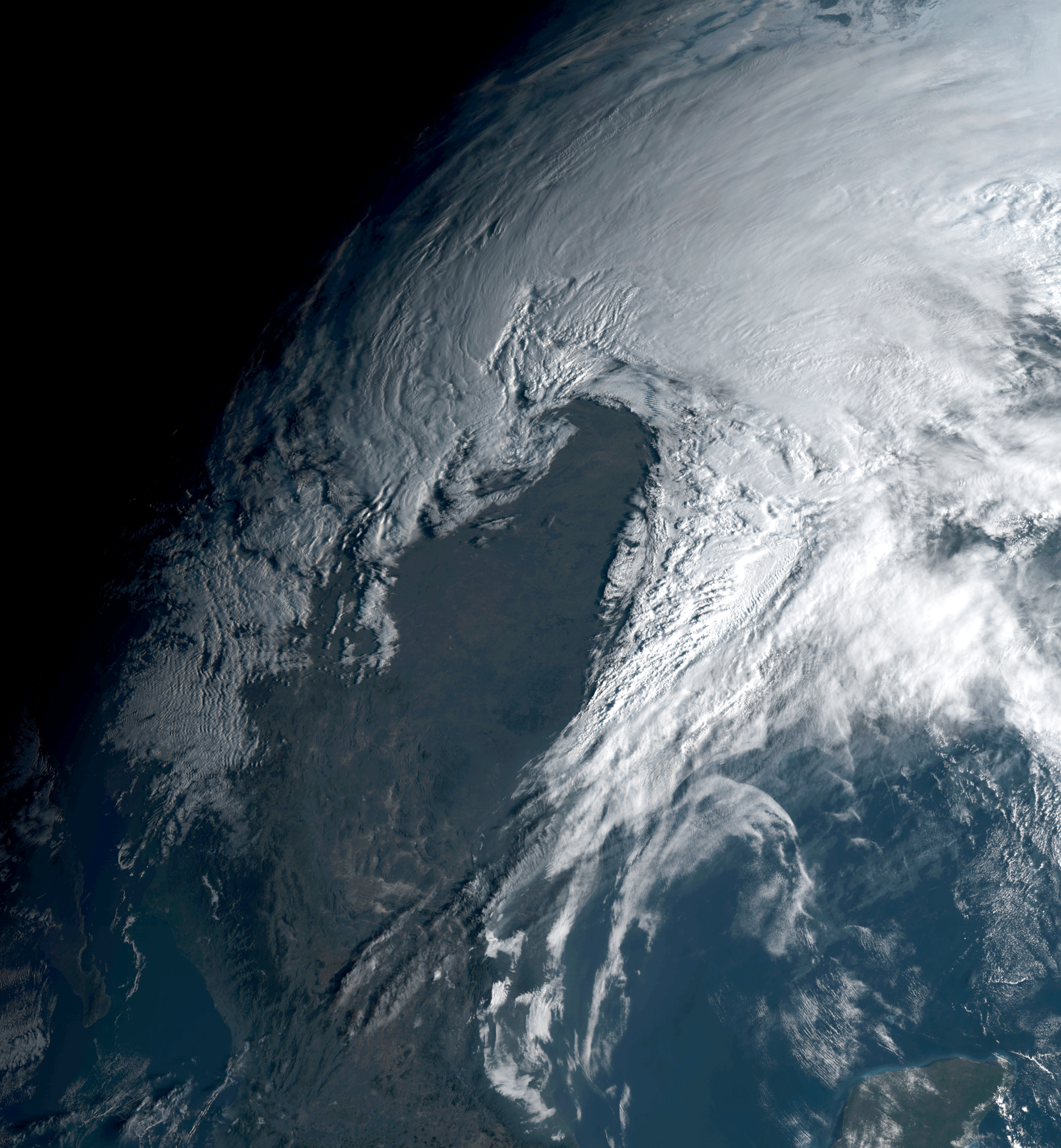
- The extratropical cyclone responsible for the blizzard over the Midwestern United States at 14:01 UTC (10:01 a.m. CDT) on March 13.

Meteorological history
- Formed: March 8, 2019
- Dissipated: March 16, 2019

Category 1 "Notable" winter storm
- Regional snowfall index: 1.84 (NOAA)
- Highest gusts: 109 mph (175 km/h) at Grand Prairie Airport
- Max. snowfall: 52 in (1,300 mm) at Wolf Creek pass, Colorado

Tornado outbreak
- Tornadoes: 38
- Max. rating: EF2 tornado
- Duration: 2 days, 3 hours and 14 minutes
- Lowest pressure: 968 hPa (mbar); 28.59 inHg

Overall effects
- Fatalities: 1
- Damage: Unknown, at least $14.91 million tornadically
- Areas affected: Southwestern United States, Rocky Mountains, Great Plains, Central United States, Eastern United States, Eastern Canada
- Power outages: 140,000+
- Part of the 2018–19 North American winter and tornado outbreaks of 2019

The March 2019 North American blizzard was a powerful Colorado Low that produced up to two feet of snow in the plains and Midwest. Rapid snowmelt following the storm caused historic flooding, and some areas received hurricane-force wind gusts. Comparable to the 1993 Storm of the Century, the storm was labeled a bomb cyclone after barometric pressure readings dropped in excess of 24 mbar (0.71 inHg) over a 24-hour period. After the storm entered Colorado from its origination in Arizona, the pressure dropped more than 30 mbar (0.89 inHg) and rapidly intensified over the western High Plains. The severe storm set new all-time record low barometric pressure readings in Colorado, Kansas and New Mexico. The storm itself killed only one person in Colorado, but flooding caused by the storm killed at least 3, one in Iowa and at least two in Nebraska and left ~140,000 without power in Texas.

== Meteorological history ==
The system originated from an extratropical low that developed in the Gulf of Alaska on March 8. Over the next two days, the system moved southeastward, bringing rainy and windy conditions to California on March 11, and the system was named "Winter Storm Ulmer" by The Weather Channel later that day, due to the storm's expected impacts. Early on March 12, the system moved onshore in Southern California, subsequently developing into a strong Colorado Low over the Southwestern United States. Late on March 12 through early March 13, the already-unusually strong Colorado low underwent explosive intensification, with the storm's minimum central pressure falling from 994 mbar (29.4 inHg) to 968 mbar (28.6 inHg) in roughly 16 hours, more than meeting the criteria for a weather bomb or "bomb cyclone" (a storm that undergoes a pressure drop of at least 24 mbar (0.71 inHg) in 24 hours). The storm's tight pressure gradient allowed wind gusts in excess of 100 mph to develop in the Texas Panhandle. As the storm headed northward towards the Great Lakes, blizzard conditions were reported in several States, from Colorado all the way north into North Dakota and flooding hit the southern portions of those states. The storm also began weakening.

== Impacts ==
=== United States ===
At least 1 million acres of U.S. farmland, in nine major grain producing states, were flooded after the storm.

==== Alabama ====
Severe weather damage was widespread throughout the state, mainly from the 13 tornadoes that touched down on March 14. The strongest was an EF2 tornado, that passed north Holtville and continued to just southwest of Weoka, destroying or damaging outbuildings, homes, convenience stores, power poles, and trees along its path. A car was also moved 30 yards (27 m). In Fayette, 1.75 inches (4.4 cm) was reported while damaging winds knocked down numerous trees and power lines. Winds of 75 miles per hour (121 km/h) were reported near both Leola and Loveless.

==== Colorado ====
The storm underwent explosive cyclogenesis as it tracked across the Southern Rocky Mountains. Colorado experienced heavy snow and hurricane-force wind gusts from the blizzard, up to as much as 110 miles per hour (180 km/h). 6 to 10 inches (150 to 250 mm) of snow was recorded in the Denver region with 20 in (510 mm) reported in Nederland. The storm brought wind gusts that exceeded Category 2 hurricane strength with gusts reaching 96 miles per hour (154 km/h) recorded at Peterson Air Force Base and a 92 mph (148 km/h) gust recorded in Glen Haven. A Category 1 force wind gust of 80 mph (130 km/h) was reported at Denver International Airport. The combination of high winds and snowy conditions forced the cancellation of all flights in and out of Denver International Airport most of the day March 13 and a third of the flights scheduled for March 14th. The rapid intensification of the storm over Colorado set a new all-time record low pressure record of 970.4 mbar (28.66 inHg) in Lamar, which is somewhat lower than the previous record for Colorado set in 1973 at 973.4 mbar (28.74 inHg). Numerous vehicular accidents were reported with at least 1,000 people stranded on the highways, requiring rescue by the National Guard and emergency services providers. A Colorado State Patrol officer was killed by one driver who lost control of his vehicle on Interstate 76 northeast of Denver.

==== Iowa ====
Iowa was also affected by heavy rains and flooding, closing parts of all nine state parks. Iowa Governor Kim Reynolds signed an emergency disaster proclamation March 14th. One man was killed in Iowa. Flooding across Iowa was described as "catastrophic" especially in the Missouri River Valley south of Council Bluffs, Iowa. There, at least 30 levee failures flooded towns and highways. Interstate 29 was closed from Council Bluffs to the Missouri state border and from there to St. Joseph, Missouri, with portions of the interstate under 15 ft (4.6 m) of water.

==== Kentucky ====
The state was affected by severe thunderstorms that produced several tornadoes. Most notably, an EF2 tornado spotted near West Paducah, strong enough to rip part of the roof off of the Mount Zion church. Other tornadoes were also spotted, one in Morgansfield and the other 7 miles (11 km) north of Corydon.

==== Kansas ====
Meteorologists were forecasting a record low barometric pressure reading as the storm passed over Kansas. The current record set in 1878 at 971.6 mbar (28.69 inHg) and the storm was forecast to have a slightly lower reading, the equivalent of a Category 2 Hurricane. Dodge City, Kansas reported a new record low pressure.

==== Michigan ====
Upwards of 70 buildings in Vernon were damaged by an EF2 tornado late on March 14. Strong winds and flooding also affected the state.

==== Nebraska ====
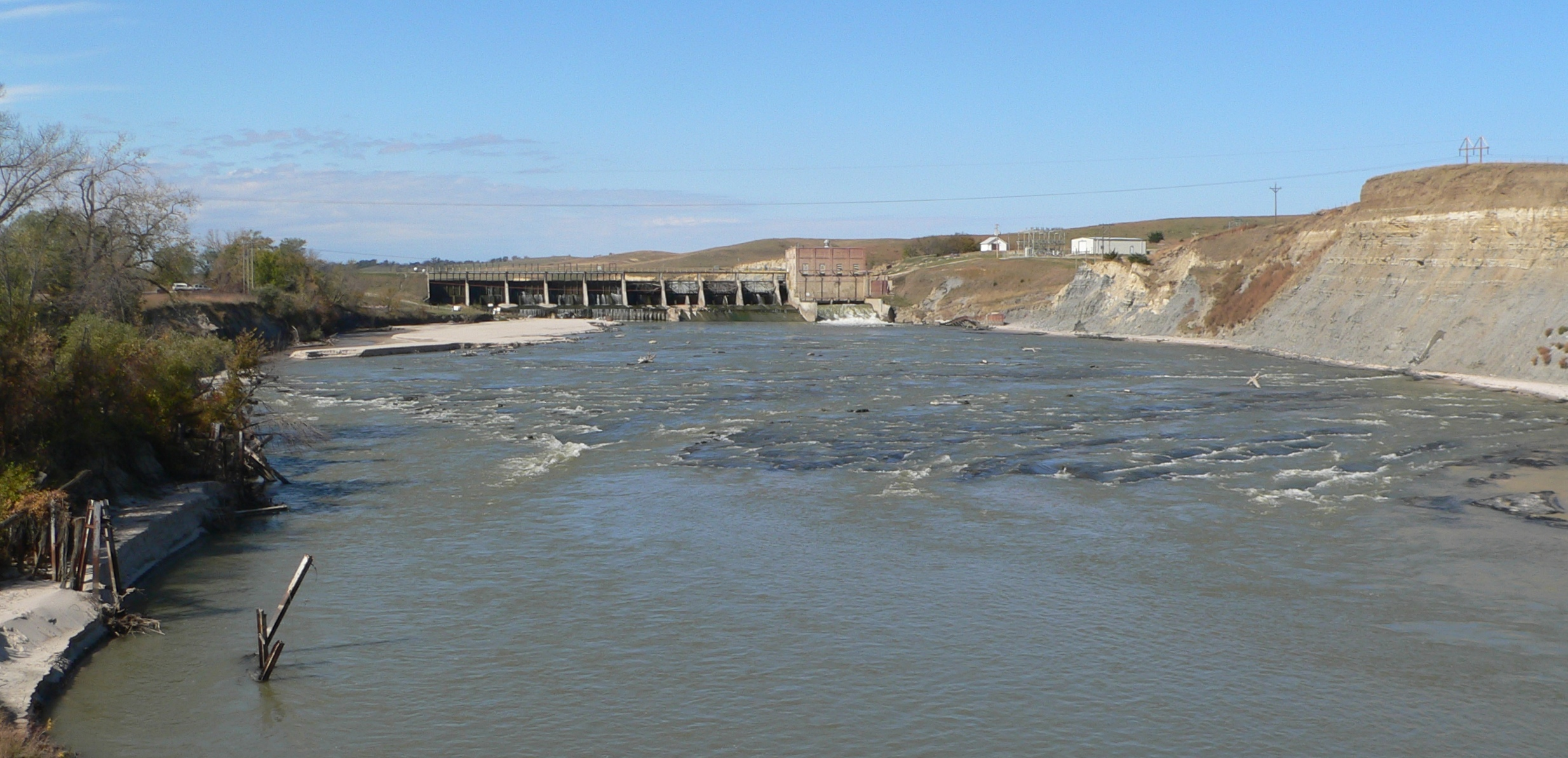
The Spencer dam as seen in 2010 was destroyed by flooding waters of the Niobrara River

Western Nebraska experienced severe wind gusts and more than a foot of snow in some localities. A wind gust of 89 mph (143 km/h) was recorded in Hemingford, Nebraska and Interstate 80 was closed from Kearney, Nebraska to the Wyoming border. The Interstate 80 closure in Nebraska along with the portions closed in Wyoming spanned a distance of more than 500 miles (800 km). In the eastern half of the state, rapidly melting snows along with frozen rivers caused record setting flooding in many rivers and streams. On the Niobrara River, the Spencer Dam collapsed and the unregulated flooding killed one person and destroyed three bridges downstream including the Highway 281 bridge. In east central Nebraska, residents along the flooded Missouri, Platte and Elkhorn Rivers were forced to evacuate as some locals experienced all-time record flooding. The city of Norfolk, Nebraska evacuated a third of its residents. The Platte and Elkhorn Rivers had overflowed their levees in the greater Omaha, Nebraska region and some communities were put under a mandatory evacuation order. The Platte River at numerous sites had reached flooding of "historical proportions" with some sites breaking all-time record flood levels by as much as 5 feet (1.5 m). By March 15, access to the city of Fremont was blocked due to all roads being closed in and out of the city. This remained the case days later with national guard military convoys being set up to get food and other supplies into the city. Offutt Air Force Base had extensive flooding from the Platte River and 3,000 ft (910 m) of their only runway was covered in water while 30 buildings had been flooded. As of March 18, 2 persons were reported to have drowned in Nebraska and 2 more are missing and presumed dead. On March 18, Nebraska governor Pete Ricketts stated that the floods caused "the most extensive damage our state has ever experienced." Losses from flooding in Nebraska alone exceeds $1.3 Billion, including $449 million in infrastructure damage, $440 million of crop damage, $400 million of lost cattle. More than 2,000 homes and 340 businesses were damaged or destroyed, costing the state another $85 million.

In the central parts of Nebraska, large ice slabs were reported to have destroyed crops, and Sub-Zero conditions often hurt livestock. An additional round of Flooding is said to have wiped out some farms for years.

==== New Mexico ====
A new all-time low barometric pressure reading for New Mexico was set in Clayton and wind gusts of 100 mph (160 km/h) were recorded in Cloudcroft, New Mexico. In addition, powerful thunderstorms moving through the state spawned several tornadoes, damaging many homes.

==== Oklahoma ====
A high wind warning was issued by the National Weather Service as thunderstorms with 50 mph (80 km/h) wind gusts downed power lines, tree branches, some fences, and caused other kinds of minor wind damage across Oklahoma City and its suburbs.

==== South Dakota ====
The City of Pierre achieved full on blizzard conditions (frequent wind gusts above 35 mph/56 km/h producing visibility lower than 1/4 mile/400 metres for at least 3 hours). These conditions prompted the closure of the I-90 from Wall to Chamberlain. 18.3 inches (46 cm) of snow fell in Kadoka and winds gusted to 70 mph (112 km/h) in Rapid City.

==== Texas ====
At San Augustin Pass and at Pine Springs, Texas wind gusts of 104 and 103 mph (167 and 166 km/h) respectively were recorded. At Grand Prairie's municipal airport, a wind gust of 109 mph (175 km/h) tore through, flipping several small airplanes. Winds were great enough in the Texas panhandle to blow over numerous tractor-trailers.

==== Wyoming ====
Blizzard conditions were reported for all of eastern Wyoming, especially in the southeastern sections of the state from Casper to the state capital in Cheyenne. Snowfalls in excess of one foot were recorded in several locations with wind gusts of 76 mph (122 km/h) in Carbon County. Both Interstate 25 and Interstate 80 were closed through most of the state.

An additional snow squall moved across Southeast Wyoming Friday through Sunday, adding 1-2 inches of snow. Due to the location of the low, many areas were above freezing and had rain instead, which prompted the NWS to issue Flood watches and warnings in the area.

=== Canada ===
==== Atlantic Canada ====
The storm brought above seasonal temperatures to much of Atlantic Canada, along with soaking rains. Although, Labrador was affected by heavy snow with up to 30 cm (1 foot) of snow in some areas. Afterwards, the storm moved out to sea.

==== Ontario and Quebec ====
The provinces experienced their warmest day in weeks, sparking the risk for isolated severe thunderstorms in extreme southwestern Ontario. These storms triggered flooding along the Humber River, resulting in an evacuation order for 200 people. Behind the storm's cold front, cold, below seasonal temperatures returned along with snowsqualls in the snow belts. Meanwhile, Northern Ontario was hit with heavy snow and strong winds, producing blizzard-like conditions.

== Tornado outbreak ==
Confirmed tornadoes by Enhanced Fujita rating
EFU	EF0	EF1	EF2	EF3	EF4	EF5	Total
0	20	13	5	0	0	0	38

=== March 12 event ===
List of confirmed tornadoes – Tuesday, March 12, 2019 (Note: All dates are based on the local time zone where the tornado touched down; however, all times are in Coordinated Universal Time for consistency.)
EF#	Location	County / Parish	State	Start Coord.	Time (UTC)	Path length	Max width
EF2	N of Hagerman to Dexter	Chaves	NM	33.0010°N 104.4402°W	23:55–00:10	15.19 mi (24.45 km)	350 yd (320 m)
EF2	A strong tornado touched down near Hagerman before moving northward and striking the town of Dexter. Six homes or mobile homes in Dexter were severely damaged or destroyed, while an additional dozen others suffered minor to moderate damage. An RV camper was tossed and destroyed, and debris was scattered throughout the town and wrapped around power lines. Trees and power lines were downed, and pivot irrigation sprinklers were destroyed outside of town. Six people were injured. This was the earliest EF1 or stronger tornado in the state of New Mexico on record and also the first tornado in Chaves County during the month of March going back to 1959.						
EF2	S of Malaga	Eddy	NM	32.1763°N 104.0794°W	00:08–00:30	14.7 mi (23.7 km)	880 yd (800 m)
EF2	Numerous power poles were snapped or damaged along the path.						
EF1	E of Andrews	Andrews	TX	32.3199°N 102.4883°W	02:55–03:01	0.81 mi (1.30 km)	350 yd (320 m)
EF1	Homes and mobile homes sustained roof damage as a result of this high-end EF1 tornado, including one frame home that sustained collapse of its attached garage. A mobile home was flipped upside down, and an overhead door was bowed out at a metal building. Power poles were damaged, street signs were bent to the ground, and a small outbuilding was blown across a road and destroyed. A large 300 ft (91 m) tall communications tower was toppled, though the structure was determined to have been top-heavy. Trees were snapped, and an empty fiberglass storage tank was blown over as well.						
EF1	E of Anton	Hockley, Lamb	TX	33.8006°N 102.1549°W	03:35–03:40	3.41 mi (5.49 km)	125 yd (114 m)
EF1	A large metal building was destroyed, a single family residence suffered significant damage, and a center pivot was damaged as well. Trees and powerlines were snapped.						

=== March 13 event ===
List of confirmed tornadoes – Wednesday, March 13, 2019
EF#	Location	County / Parish	State	Start Coord.	Time (UTC)	Path length	Max width
EF0	Southwestern Junction	Kimble	TX	30.4861°N 99.7843°W	08:00–08:01	0.19 mi (0.31 km)	30 yd (27 m)
EF0	Storage sheds and an awning in town were damaged by this brief tornado. A power pole was snapped at its base while a nearby home had its windows blown out.						
EF0	Junction	Kimble	TX	30.4900°N 99.7756°W	08:03–08:05	0.71 mi (1.14 km)	140 yd (130 m)
EF0	This tornado touched down immediately after the previous tornado lifted in Junction. Several roofs were ripped off, windows were blown out, and trees and power lines were damaged. A piece of wood was impaled into the exterior wall of a residence, and a deer feeder lid was lodged into the side of a business. An overhead door was blown out at a fire station.						
EF1	Zephyr	Brown	TX	31.679°N 98.8001°W	08:19–08:21	1.39 mi (2.24 km)	230 yd (210 m)
EF1	A small residence in Zephyr was overturned and tossed 50 ft (15 m) from its foundation. Several roofs were ripped off, awnings and power lines were destroyed, power poles were snapped, and the brick wall was blown out of a store. Trees and a grandstand were damaged.						
EF1	E of Mineral Wells	Palo Pinto, Parker	TX	32.8088°N 98.0924°W	08:25–08:28	2.3 mi (3.7 km)	250 yd (230 m)
EF1	A manufacturing storage building lost some sheet metal roofing. A commercial automotive repair center suffered significant roof and wall damage. Damage to signs, utility poles, and trees occurred as well.						
EF1	NE of Cool	Parker	TX	32.865°N 97.9102°W	08:37–08:39	0.75 mi (1.21 km)	250 yd (230 m)
EF1	A site-built frame home had most of its roof removed. A nearby metal-clad commercial building saw its metal roof cross members severely twisted and most of its sheet metal roofing ripped off. Trees and outbuildings were damaged.						

=== March 14 event ===
List of confirmed tornadoes – Thursday, March 14, 2019
EF#	Location	County / Parish	State	Start Coord.	Time (UTC)	Path length	Max width
EF2	NW of Cunningham to West Paducah	Carlisle, Ballard, McCracken	KY	36.9236°N 88.896°W	14:18–14:35	16.71 mi (26.89 km)	300 yd (270 m)
EF2	This strong tornado first passed near the towns of Lovelaceville, Massac, and Camelia, causing significant damage to at least a dozen homes, including a few with roof loss and some exterior walls ripped off. Dozens of barns, outbuildings, garages, and grain bins were also destroyed. A church had most of its roof and a second-story exterior wall torn off, and vehicles were damaged by flying debris in the parking lot. A business was heavily damaged, a pontoon boat was thrown 120 yd (110 m), and a mobile home was rolled and destroyed. The tornado weakened as it struck West Paducah, where a mall and an adjacent strip mall sustained damage to their roofs and metal fascia. Other businesses had roofing and siding peeled off, a semi-truck was blown over, fences were downed, and signs were damaged as well. Dozens of power poles were blown down, and hundreds of trees were snapped or uprooted along the path. Over a dozen vehicles were damaged. One injury occurred when a grain bin was blown on top of a pickup truck. This tornado passed very close to the National Weather Service office in Paducah, and was caught on video by a meteorologist on duty.						
EF1	W of Morganfield	Union	KY	37.6317°N 88.0728°W	15:10–15:22	9.86 mi (15.87 km)	125 yd (114 m)
EF1	A semi-truck was blown over, resulting in minor injuries to the driver. Dozens of trees were snapped or uprooted, several power poles were toppled, and a farm building had a portion of its roof ripped off. A car, a trailer, and a second semi-trailer were blown upside down as well.						
EF0	NW of Smith Mills	Henderson	KY	37.7973°N 87.7769°W	16:14–16:15	1.25 mi (2.01 km)	100 yd (91 m)
EF0	Several trees and tree limbs were snapped, and a few trees were uprooted.						
EF0	NNW of Viola	Graves	KY	36.8572°N 88.6342°W	16:27–16:28	0.68 mi (1.09 km)	75 yd (69 m)
EF0	Brief tornado uprooted two large trees.						
EF0	N of Sebree	Webster, Henderson	KY	36.6413°N 87.5314°W	17:42–17:44	1.23 mi (1.98 km)	100 yd (91 m)
EF0	Several trees and limbs were downed. Shingles were blown off a house.						
EF1	N of Brownstown	Jackson	IN	38.9202°N 86.0382°W	18:06-18:07	1.24 mi (2.00 km)	40 yd (37 m)
EF1	A brief tornado damaged some agricultural operations, destroying a pole barn and blowing the roof off of a grain silo.						
EF0	NE of Campbellsburg	Washington	IN	38.7225°N 86.2251°W	18:14–18:17	3 mi (4.8 km)	35 yd (32 m)
EF0	A low-hanging wall cloud produced a tornado that intermittently reached the ground, snapping several treetops. A nearby barn sustained significant damage.						
EF0	N of Slaughters	Webster	KY	37.504°N 87.4958°W	18:15–18:17	2.27 mi (3.65 km)	50 yd (46 m)
EF0	One television antenna was knocked over. Corn fields were disturbed along the path.						
EF0	SSE of Lowell	Lake	IN	41.2704°N 87.4072°W	18:51–18:53	1.46 mi (2.35 km)	75 yd (69 m)
EF0	Some shingle damage was inflicted to a home and one utility pole was snapped, with others damaged. Most of the damage was limited to fallen trees. The tornado was first tornado in Lake County since 2014 and the earliest in the calendar year for the county since 1976.						
EF1	N of Hanceville to SW of Holly Pond	Cullman	AL	34.095°N 86.7734°W	21:10–21:30	11.07 mi (17.82 km)	112 yd (102 m)
EF1	A small hay barn was completely destroyed and several outbuildings were damaged. A community center had portions of its roof lifted up and sheets of its metal roofing peeled back. One former chicken house used as a storage building had its entire roof ripped off while a second chicken house suffered moderate damage. Trees were snapped and uprooted.						
EF0	NW of Allgood	Blount	AL	33.9256°N 86.5439°W	22:04–22:09	2.58 mi (4.15 km)	115 yd (105 m)
EF0	Damage associated with the tornadoes was primarily limited to trees with the exception of a damaged porch on a single-family home.						
EF1	Allgood to SW of Gallant	Blount, Etowah, St. Clair	AL	33.8921°N 86.5409°W	22:05–22:29	8.32 mi (13.39 km)	1,175 yd (1,074 m)
EF1	A mobile home park in Allgood suffered extensive damage from falling trees, with some mobile homes destroyed. A barn and an outbuilding were destroyed, and several frame homes sustained minor roof damage. Past Allgood, minor roof and structural damage occurred, and farm structures were damaged, including chicken houses that had sheet metal roofing peeled off. Numerous soft and hardwood trees were either snapped or uprooted along the path, some of which landed on vehicles and houses.						
EF0	S of Bankhead Lock and Dam	Tuscaloosa	AL	33.3733°N 87.3468°W	22:25–22:28	1.24 mi (2.00 km)	50 yd (46 m)
EF0	A tornado was confirmed over a heavily forested area based on radar data. Trees were downed, and a mobile home sustained minor damage.						
EF2	NW of Perry to SW of Lennon	Shiawassee	MI	42.834°N 84.2384°W	22:45–23:05	18.2 mi (29.3 km)	700 yd (640 m)
EF2	A significant tornado touched down near Perry before passing near Morrice. 10 mobile homes were damaged by falling trees in this area, and frame homes sustained roof damage and broken windows. North of Bancroft, the tornado intensified and inflicted severe structural damage to several homes, including a two-story house that sustained total roof removal and collapse of a second floor exterior wall. Additional major damage occurred at the southeastern fringes of Vernon, where multiple homes sustained severe roof and wall damage, and a fabrication business was destroyed. Housing insulation from Vernon was found up to 7 mi (11 km) away. Barns and outbuildings were destroyed along the path, and trees and power lines were downed. The tornado was the first to impact Shiawassee County since June 2015.						
EF0	WNW of Pittsburg	Shiawassee	MI	42.8842°N 84.223°W	22:47–22:54	6.4 mi (10.3 km)	100 yd (91 m)
EF0	Numerous pine and hardwood trees were snapped along the path of the tornado. One farm outbuilding lost its roof.						
EF1	SE of Springville	St. Clair	AL	33.7269°N 86.3633°W	22:54–23:03	4.71 mi (7.58 km)	530 yd (480 m)
EF1	This tornado damaged or destroyed several outbuildings and downed hundreds of trees; several trees fell on structures, damaging them.						
EF0	SE of Flushing	Genesee	MI	42.9927°N 83.8910°W	23:09–23:17	8.05 mi (12.96 km)	125 yd (114 m)
EF0	A pole barn was collapsed and trees were snapped and downed.						
EF0	ENE of Morgan Springs	Perry	AL	32.7638°N 87.3668°W	23:19–23:26	4.48 mi (7.21 km)	100 yd (91 m)
EF0	Snapped and fallen trees blocked some roadways.						
EF0	NW of Grayton	Calhoun	AL	33.8453°N 86.0295°W	23:22–23:24	1.18 mi (1.90 km)	200 yd (180 m)
EF0	Damage was mostly snapped or uprooted trees, however one house sustained minor shingle damage.						
EF0	N of Genesee Township	Genesee	MI	43.1069°N 83.6465°W	23:24–23:29	6.54 mi (10.53 km)	75 yd (69 m)
EF0	One mobile home was flipped onto its side and a second was partially blown off its foundation. Other homes suffered roof and siding damage. Trees were snapped, and a couple of small trailers were flipped.						
EF1	ESE of Ellards	Perry, Chilton	AL	32.7966°N 87.1707°W	23:37–23:57	9.44 mi (15.19 km)	300 yd (270 m)
EF1	Some power poles and numerous trees were toppled by the tornado, with some outbuildings damaged by the uprooted trees.						
EF0	ENE of Dayton	Marengo	AL	32.396°N 87.6105°W	23:39–23:49	5.06 mi (8.14 km)	150 yd (140 m)
EF0	Several trees were snapped and a few homes suffered minor damage.						
EF0	E of Cave Spring	Floyd	GA	34.1187°N 85.2586°W	00:06–00:08	1.68 mi (2.70 km)	150 yd (140 m)
EF0	Two homes were damaged. One had its carport collapsed and portions of its roof and a nearby building peeled back. The second had a significant portion of its metal roof peeled back, and a trampoline was tossed 100 yd (91 m) over the structure into nearby trees. A shed was destroyed and numerous trees were snapped or uprooted.						
EF0	Navarre	Stark	OH	40.8014°N 81.4427°W	00:11–00:17	8.7 mi (14.0 km)	50 yd (46 m)
EF0	Trees were either uprooted or sustained broken tree limbs. Some minor shingle and siding damage occurred to a few homes in town.						
EF0	Nimishillen Township	Stark	OH	40.87°N 81.31°W	00:23-00:26	1.6 mi (2.6 km)	100 yd (91 m)
EF0	A silo and two barn roofs were damaged. Numerous trees were snapped or uprooted, some of which fell on power lines. A gazebo was collapsed, the foundation of a garage was cracked, and doors to a barn and a garage were damaged or collapsed. Several homes had shingles and siding ripped off.						
EF0	NNW of Central Mills	Perry, Dallas	AL	32.3449°N 87.4677°W	00:27–00:33	2.94 mi (4.73 km)	300 yd (270 m)
EF0	Damage was mostly limited to trees, though one home lost a portion of its roof.						
EF0	N of Clanton to SSE of Marble Valley	Chilton, Coosa	AL	32.9276°N 86.6157°W	00:39–01:06	11.91 mi (19.17 km)	350 yd (320 m)
EF0	Minor tree damage occurred where the tornado first touched down, along with brick facade damage to a home. Sheet metal was torn off of manufactured homes and outbuildings. Widespread tree damage occurred in heavily forested areas throughout the path of the tornado.						
EF0	E of Weogufka	Coosa	AL	33.0221°N 86.2749°W	01:21–01:23	0.62 mi (1.00 km)	40 yd (37 m)
EF0	Damage was limited to snapped and uprooted trees.						
EF1	NW of Independence	Autauga	AL	32.5282°N 86.788°W	01:44–01:55	7.09 mi (11.41 km)	250 yd (230 m)
EF1	Numerous trees were snapped or uprooted, and a few homes suffered minor roof damage.						
EF0	ESE of Parkdale	Coosa	AL	33.0809°N 86.0820°W	01:46–01:51	2.07 mi (3.33 km)	150 yd (140 m)
EF0	Some metal roof sheeting was stripped by the tornado alongside snapped and uprooted trees.						
EF2	NNE of Holtville	Elmore	AL	32.6413°N 86.3385°W	02:32–02:48	8.58 mi (13.81 km)	650 yd (590 m)
EF2	A strong tornado caused significant damage as it passed south of Titus. At least 50 structures were damaged, including several homes that sustained total roof loss and some collapse of exterior walls. At least 35 power poles were snapped or downed, and numerous trees were snapped or uprooted, including a large swath of trees that was completely flattened in a convergent pattern. Two convenience stores were damaged, with a gas station canopy toppled over onto one of them. Outbuildings were destroyed, and a car was tossed over 30 yd (27 m) as well.						
EF0	SSW of Wedowee	Randolph	AL	33.2979°N 85.5907°W	03:00–03:09	4.38 mi (7.05 km)	75 yd (69 m)
EF0	An outbuilding destroyed and roof damage was inflicted to a chicken house.						

== See also ==
- Weather of 2019
- Bomb cyclone
- 1993 Storm of the Century – An extremely powerful extratropical cyclone that brought blizzard conditions to extensive portions of the Eastern U.S. in March 1993
- March 2014 North American winter storm
- April 2019 North American blizzard
