= Dogtown, DeKalb County, Alabama =

Unincorporated community in Alabama, United States

Dogtown, Alabama
- Unincorporated community
- Location within Alabama Location within the United States
- Coordinates: 34°21′10″N 85°44′13″W
- Country: United States
- State: Alabama
- County: DeKalb
- Elevation: 1,358 ft (414 m)
- Time zone: UTC-6 (Central (CST))
  - Summer (DST): UTC-5 (CDT)
- Area code: 256

Dogtown, also known as Cagle's Crossroads, Dog Town, and Ruhama, is an unincorporated community in DeKalb County, Alabama, United States.

== History ==
First called Cagle's Crossroads after a local family, the community was then called Dogtown due to the large number of hunters and their dogs that frequented the area. It is also referred to as Ruhama, in reference to a local Baptist church that was organized in 1900.

== Education ==
This location is served by Ruhama Junior High School, which is a part of the Dekalb County Schools District. The current Principal is Dr. Stevie Green.
