= Chigger Hill, Alabama =

Unincorporated community in Alabama, United States

- Unincorporated community
- Location within Alabama
- Coordinates: 34°23′51″N 86°00′59″W
- Country: United States
- State: Alabama
- County: DeKalb
- Elevation: 1,122 ft (342 m)
- Time zone: UTC-6 (Central (CST))
  - Summer (DST): UTC-5 (CDT)
- Area code: 256
- GNIS feature ID: 150154

Chigger Hill is an unincorporated community in DeKalb County, Alabama, United States.

== History ==
Chigger Hill was named from the fact the original settlers had to combat a serious infestation of mites. It has frequently been noted on lists of unusual place names.
