= Adamsburg, Alabama =

Unincorporated community in Alabama, United States

- Unincorporated community
- Location within Alabama
- Coordinates: 34°23′56″N 085°40′20″W
- Country: United States
- State: Alabama
- County: DeKalb
- Elevation: 1,467 ft (447 m)
- Time zone: UTC-6 (Central (CST))
  - Summer (DST): UTC-5 (CDT)
- ZIP code: 35967
- Area code: 256
- GNIS ID: 150061

Adamsburg is an unincorporated community located on Lookout Mountain in eastern DeKalb County, Alabama, United States, southeast of the county seat of Fort Payne, and just west of Little River Canyon.

== History ==
Adamsburg was named for Simon Russell Canfield Adams, a minister from Fort Payne who donated land for a school in the community. A post office was established in Adamsburg in 1902, but it has since closed.

== Geography ==
Adamsburg is located at 34°23′56″N 085°40′20″W. Its average elevation is 1,467 feet (447 m) above sea level.

== Demographics ==
=== Adamsburg Precinct (1930-50) ===
Historical population
Census	Pop.	Note	%±
1930	1,145		—
1940	1,161		1.4%
1950	1,184		2.0%
U.S. Decennial Census

Adamsburg has never reported a population figure separately on the U.S. Census as an unincorporated community. However, the 20th census precinct within DeKalb County bore its name from 1930 to 1950 (the precinct previously having been named Moores from 1890 to 1920). In the 1930 and 1940 returns, when the census recorded racial statistics for the precincts, both times reported a White majority for the precinct. In 1960, the precincts were merged and/or reorganized into census divisions (as part of a general reorganization of counties) and it was consolidated into the present census division of Fort Payne.
