= E. T. York =

American university administrator, professor, agronomist (1922–2011)

E.T. York, Jr.
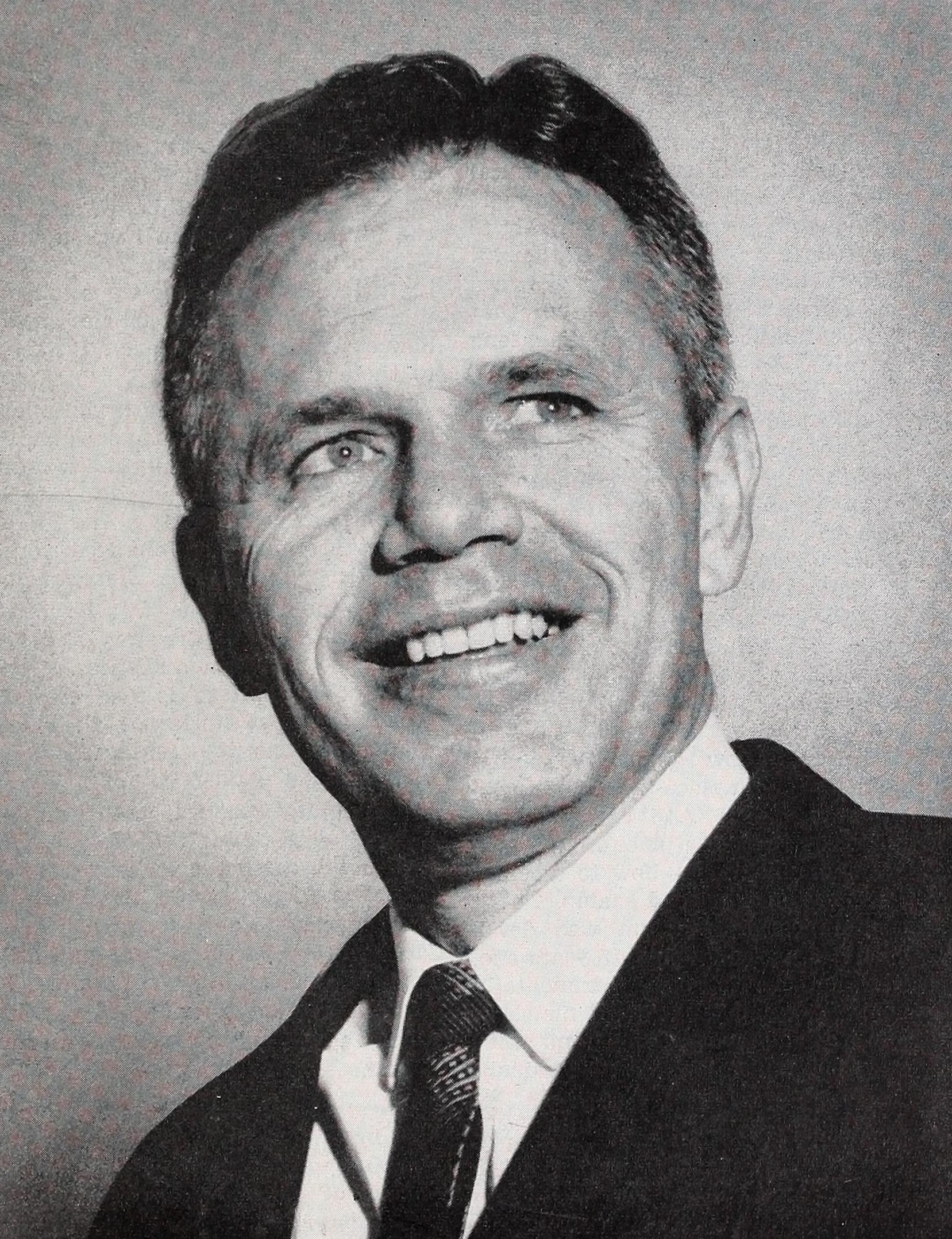
- Born: July 4, 1922; Valley Head, Alabama, U.S.
- Died: April 15, 2011 (aged 88); Gainesville, Florida, U.S.
- Education: B.S., Alabama Polytechnic Inst., 1942; M.S., Alabama Polytechnic Inst., 1946; Ph.D., Cornell University, 1955
- Occupations: Agronomist; University professor Extension Service administrator University administrator
- Spouse: Vermelle "Vam" Cardwell York

E. Travis York Jr. (July 4, 1922 – April 15, 2011) was an American agronomist, professor, university administrator, agricultural extension administrator, and U.S. presidential adviser. He served as director of the Alabama Cooperative Extension Service, administrator of the federal Extension Service, interim president of the University of Florida, and chancellor of the State University System of Florida.

== Early life and education ==
York was born and raised in Valley Head in northeast Alabama. After graduating from high school in 1939, he enrolled at Alabama Polytechnic Institute (API) (now Auburn University) in Auburn, Alabama, and earned a Bachelor of Science degree in agricultural science in 1942.

Following service in World War II as officer in the U.S. Army field artillery, York returned to API to pursue graduate studies in soil science. During this time, he married Vermelle "Vam" Cardwell of Evergreen, Alabama, an undergraduate majoring in business administration and president of the API Women's Student Government Association.

He received a Master of Science degree in agronomy and soils in 1946 and was subsequently accepted into the doctoral program at Cornell University in Ithaca, New York. At Cornell, he studied under soil scientist Richard Bradfield, whose work helped shape York’s focus on food production and agricultural development, particularly in developing countries. These interests would later guide his involvement in international food security efforts through land-grant universities.

After earning his Doctor of Philosophy degree, York became an associate professor of agronomy at North Carolina State University in Raleigh, North Carolina, eventually serving as chairman of the Department of Agronomy. In 1956, he left North Carolina State to become a regional director for the Potash Institute.

York joined the University of Florida in 1963 as vice president for agricultural affairs.

== Extension service ==
In 1959, York returned to his alma mater to succeed P.O. Davis as director of the Alabama Cooperative Extension Service in Auburn, Alabama. At the time of his appointment, York became the youngest person to serve as director of Alabama Extension.

Contemporary state newspapers, including the Andalusia Star-News, credited the program with expanding its economic development focus under York's leadership. He envisioned Alabama Extension as an organization committed to the economic advancement of the entire state—beyond just the farming community or urban residents seeking lawn and garden advice.

E.T. embodied the ideas of service, loyalty and generosity. He built the Institute of Food and Agricultural Sciences from the ground up, and he stepped up to serve the university and the state of Florida whenever and wherever he was needed. He was an absolute giant of a man in every sense[.]

— University of Florida President Bernie Machen, on the 2011 death of York

He supported cooperation with other groups, calling on extension educators to "make these other groups members of our own team rather than to compete with them by attempting to do the total job by ourselves." Perceiving the need for a highly trained and qualified staff, York developed a study program to allow extension professionals to pursue advanced degrees while earning full pay. York also established a practice of replacing vacancies only with professionals with advanced degrees— a policy that enhanced the quality of Alabama Extension programming.

During York’s tenure, the Alabama Extension sought to distance itself from local, state, and national politics. One of his earliest actions as the new Alabama Extension director was to remove the organization from partisan politics. He invited the senior county extension agents to dinner, all of whom had actively used their positions in state and local politics, and announced that anyone who used his position for political gain or influence in the future would be fired.

In 1961, at the request of U.S. Secretary of Agriculture Orville Freeman, York took a leave of absence as director of the Alabama Extension to serve as the administrator for the federal Extension Service (now the Cooperative State Research, Education and Extension Service) in Washington, D.C., becoming the youngest person to ever hold the position.

== University administrator ==
Instead of returning to Auburn University as planned, York accepted an offer to serve as the provost for agriculture at the University of Florida in Gainesville. Later, he also served as the university's vice president for agricultural, natural and human resources, and its executive vice president.

During his tenure at Florida, he implemented several changes. He merged the College of Agricultural Life Sciences, the Florida Cooperative Extension Service, and the Florida Agricultural Experiment Station under the Institute of Food and Agricultural Sciences (IFAS) in 1964. He established the Center for Tropical Agriculture, which extended IFAS' international influence and initiated DARE (Developing Agricultural Resources Effectively), a long-range agricultural planning program. York also founded SHARE (Special Help for Agricultural Research and Education), a University of Florida Foundation program that raises private funds for agricultural research. Since its inception, SHARE has raised more than $169 million through monetary and in-kind gifts from thousands of donors.

Upon the resignation of university president Stephen C. O'Connell in 1973, York was appointed interim president of the University of Florida. After Robert Q. Marston was chosen as his permanent successor in 1974, York was appointed chancellor of the State University System of Florida, serving from 1975 until 1980.

== Legacy ==
York retired from academia in 1980 to devote his efforts to fighting world hunger, primarily by improving the agricultural infrastructure in developing countries. He was appointed chairman of the Board for International Food and Agricultural Development (BIFAD) (a subagency of the Agency for International Development (AID)) by President Jimmy Carter, which works to strengthen and mobilize the resources of American land-grant universities to help Third World countries improve their agricultural industries through better educational and research institutions. He served in this position for three years and was succeeded by William E. Lavery. York also served as the chairman of the Board of the International Fertilizer Development Center, with sponsored programs around the world.

York authored more than 100 technical papers, journal articles and books, and lectured at more than forty universities in the United States and throughout the world. He advised U.S. Presidents John F. Kennedy, Lyndon Baines Johnson, Richard M. Nixon, Gerald R. Ford, Jimmy Carter and Ronald Reagan on sustainable agricultural development and famine relief.

York received honorary doctorates from Auburn, Florida, Ohio State and North Carolina State, and was a member of the Alabama Agricultural Hall of Honor and the Florida Agricultural Hall of Fame. In 1997, the Museum of Florida History named York as a "Great Floridian," one of the first twelve individuals honored for "shaping the state of Florida as we know it today."

York and his wife Vam remained loyal Auburn University alumni. The Yorks contributed more than $1 million to Auburn, including a $300,000 planned gift to the College of Business; more than $600,000 to the E.T. and Vam York Endowed Fund for Excellence in International Agriculture to support worldwide experiences for faculty and graduate students; and $150,000 to establish the E.T. York Distinguished Lecturer Series, which draws national and international leaders in agriculture and related disciplines to deliver public addresses on the Auburn campus.

York died on April 15, 2011, in Gainesville, at the age of 88. He was survived by Vam, his wife of 64 years, and their son Travis and daughter Lisa.

== Bibliography ==
- Pleasants, Julian M., Gator Tales: An Oral History of the University of Florida, University of Florida, Gainesville, Florida (2006). ISBN 0-8130-3054-4.
- Proctor, Samuel, & Wright Langley, Gator History: A Pictorial History of the University of Florida, South Star Publishing Company, Gainesville, Florida (1986). ISBN 0-938637-00-2.
- Van Ness, Carl, & Kevin McCarthy, Honoring the Past, Shaping the Future: The University of Florida, 1853–2003, University of Florida, Gainesville, Florida (2003).
- Yeager, Joe, & Gene Stevenson, Inside Ag Hill: The People and Events that Shaped Auburn's Agricultural History from 1872 through 1999, Sheridan Books, Chelsea, Michigan (1999).
