= Kilpatrick, Alabama =

Town in Alabama

Kilpatrick, Alabama is a town in DeKalb County, Alabama, United States.

Kilpatrick has roughly 300 residents. Kilpatrick became incorporated as a town on August 26, 2025, as the 17th incorporated municipality in DeKalb county, and the 466th municipality in Alabama, despite attempting for incorporation for many years prior. Many residents are attracted to the city due to its growth in the poultry industry. Kilpatrick has a very high percentage of Latin Americans who have moved here in response to its growing poultry industry. The community was impacted by a tornado in 2013. Its first mayor is Richard Bruce, and he was sworn in during 2025.
