= Spencer Dam =

Failed hydroelectric dam in Nebraska, US

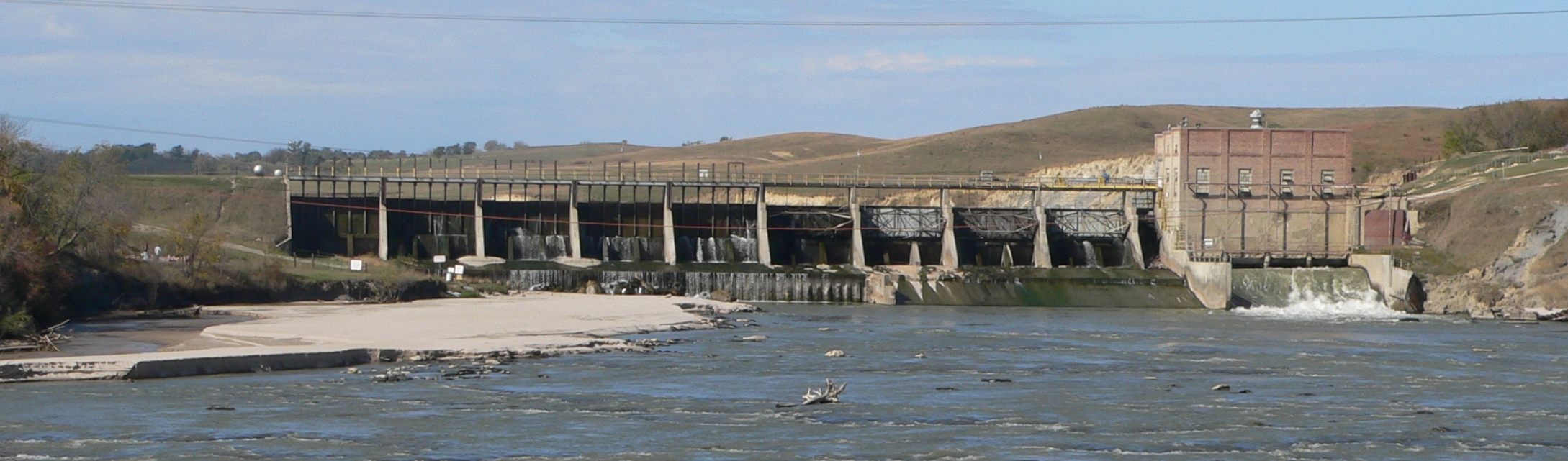
- Spencer Dam in 2010

- Location of Spencer Dam in Nebraska Spencer Dam (the United States)
- Country: United States
- Location: Near Spencer, Nebraska
- Coordinates: 42.8090°N 98.6564°W
- Purpose: Hydroelectric
- Status: Failed
- Opening date: 1927
- Demolition date: March 14, 2019
- Owner: NPPD

Dam and spillways
- Type of dam: Buttressed concrete gravity and embankment
- Impounds: Niobrara River
- Height (foundation): 26 ft (7.9 m)
- Length: 3,698 ft (1,127 m)

Reservoir
- Total capacity: 16,847 acre⋅ft (20,780,000 m^{3}) (silted)
- Surface area: 1,200 acres (490 ha)

Power station
- Commission date: 1927
- Decommission date: 2017
- Type: Conventional
- Turbines: 1x 2000 KW; 1x 1300 KW
- Installed capacity: 3300 KW
- 1996 generation: 14,848,000 KWh

Spencer Dam was a run of the river hydroelectric dam on the Niobrara River in Boyd County and Holt County, Nebraska, about 5 miles (8.0 km) southeast of Spencer. The dam was operated by the Nebraska Public Power District (NPPD). Heavy precipitation during the March 2019 North American blizzard led to a failure of the dam in the early morning of 14 March, causing heavy flooding downstream.

== History ==
Initial construction was completed in 1927, at a site located 39 miles (63 km) upstream of the Niobrara's confluence with the Missouri River. The dam was originally 3,698 feet (1,127 m) long and 26 feet (7.9 m) high, constructed in several sections. The powerhouse was located on the north bank of the river, consisting of two Westinghouse generators with capacities of 2000 and 1300 kilowatts. The spillway consisted of four tainter gates and five stoplog gates to the south of the powerhouse. The combined length of the powerhouse and spillway was 404 feet (123 m); the rest of the dam was an earth embankment extending to the south side of the Niobrara valley. The dam originally formed a reservoir with a capacity of 16,847 acre-feet (20,780,000 m^{3}), a normal storage of 5,306 acre-feet (6,545,000 m^{3}), and a surface area of 1,200 acres (490 ha). In 1935 the dam was partially breached after an ice jam broke upstream. It was reconstructed in 1940.

Both after its initial construction and after rebuilding in 1940, the dam was filled with sediment within a few years. Although this did not affect hydropower generation since the dam was operated to match the river flow, twice-annual sluicing had been conducted since 1948 to clear sediment away from the power intakes. The dam gates were opened for about two weeks each year, allowing the river to flow through and wash accumulated sediment downstream. Between 1975 and 1989, fish kills occurred in the Niobrara River that were attributed to sluicing activities. In response, engineers began draining the reservoir more slowly, which has worked in preventing further fish kills.

By 1985, Spencer Dam was the only active hydroelectric plant on the Niobrara River, after the upstream Cornell Dam ceased operation. The NPPD had rights to 1,400,000 acre-feet (1.7×10^{9} m^{3}) of water per year for power generation. As of 2007, the average annual flow through the power plant was 874,000 acre-feet (1.078×10^{9} m^{3}). In 2007, in regards to severe declines in the flow of the Niobrara River as a result of upstream irrigation, NPPD requested that the state of Nebraska make farmers pay as compensation for lost power generation. Several lawsuits were filed as a result, but as of May 2010 all had been decided in favor of NPPD, whose water rights are senior to the irrigators' rights.

In September 2015, NPPD announced that it would be decommissioning the Spencer hydropower plant in 2017 due to increasingly uneconomical cost of power generation at this site. The water rights would be sold for $9 million to the Nebraska Game and Parks Commission and five local natural resources districts to manage the river for agriculture, recreation and wildlife conservation. The dam was planned to remain in place with the gates permanently removed, allowing the river to flow freely through the site.

== 2019 failure ==
On the early morning of March 14, 2019, the dam was breached after a major storm caused heavy rain, snowmelt and ice breakage to swell the Niobrara River. The earth embankment was washed out in two locations, while the spillway remained partially intact (though heavily damaged). An 11-foot (3.4 m) wall of water was released by the failure, as recorded by a U.S. Geological Survey stream gage moments before it was washed away.

The initial break destroyed a saloon and private residence below the dam and washed out part of U.S. Highway 281. The owner of the home was reported missing and presumed dead. In the town of Niobrara, dozens of buildings and the Mormon Canal Bridge carrying Nebraska Highway 12 were washed away. A water pipeline under the Niobrara River bed was destroyed, cutting off the supply for about 2,000 people in Boyd County. The dam failure forced the evacuation of residents in low-lying areas along the river.

Shortly after the dam burst, Knox County Sheriff Don Henery announced: "The Knox County Sheriff’s Office has been advised that the Spencer Dam has been compromised. We are trying to contact everyone along the Niobrara River to evacuate them. Please pass the word. Niobrara and Verdigre (Nebraska) Fire and Rescue are on stand-by."

As the floodwaters from the Niobrara reached the Missouri River, the U.S. Army Corps of Engineers boosted releases at Gavins Point Dam to 90,000 cubic feet per second (2,500 m^{3}/s), the highest level since 2011 and the second highest on record. While the timing of Spencer Dam failing corresponds to increased releases from Gavins Point, correlation does not mean causation. Both were a result from record flows on the Niobrara River. The Chief Standing Bear Memorial Bridge across the Missouri River below the Niobrara confluence was temporarily closed as the Nebraska approach flooded, but it reopened a few days later.

NPPD later said that workers had attempted to open the dam's manually operated gates to release floodwater, but some were frozen shut by the cold weather and may have contributed to water overtopping the earthen embankment a short while later. In addition "truck-sized ice chunks" were reported to have hit the dam and also caused the destruction of the bridges downstream.

During an inspection in April 2018 the Nebraska Department of Natural Resources had warned that "deficiencies [in the dam] exist which could lead to dam failure during rare, extreme storm events."

Because the 2015 sale of the dam had been delayed until after its destruction, the damsite will no longer be sold to the state of Nebraska as originally planned. The remains of the dam are planned to be demolished, although NPPD will retain the water rights to the river.
