= Alpine, DeKalb County, Alabama =

Unincorporated community in Alabama, United States

Alpine, Alabama
- Unincorporated community
- Location within Alabama Location within the United States
- Coordinates: 34°30′19″N 85°36′37″W
- Country: United States
- State: Alabama
- County: DeKalb
- Elevation: 1,476 ft (450 m)
- Time zone: UTC-6 (Central (CST))
  - Summer (DST): UTC-5 (CDT)
- Area code: 256
- GNIS feature ID: 150483

Alpine is an unincorporated community in DeKalb County, Alabama, United States, located northeast of Fort Payne.
