= Whiton, Alabama =

Unincorporated community in Alabama, United States

- Unincorporated community
- Location within Alabama
- Coordinates: 34°21′20″N 86°04′43″W
- Country: United States
- State: Alabama
- County: DeKalb
- Elevation: 1,138 ft (347 m)
- Time zone: UTC-6 (Central (CST))
  - Summer (DST): UTC-5 (CDT)
- Area code: 256

Whiton, also known as Mitchells Mill or Whites Town, is an unincorporated community in DeKalb County, in the U.S. state of Alabama.

== History ==
The name Whiton was formed from a combination of "White" and "-ton," in honor of the first postmaster, P. White. A post office operated under the name Whiton from 1878 to 1905.
