= Loveless, Alabama =

Unincorporated community in Alabama, United States

- Unincorporated community
- Location within Alabama Location within the United States
- Coordinates: 34°19′04″N 85°45′44″W
- Country: United States
- State: Alabama
- County: DeKalb
- Elevation: 1,312 ft (400 m)
- Time zone: UTC-6 (Central (CST))
  - Summer (DST): UTC-5 (CDT)
- Area codes: 256 & 938
- GNIS feature ID: 150356

Loveless is an unincorporated community in DeKalb County, Alabama, United States, it is named after its founder, Dawson Lovelace and located 9 miles (14 km) south-southwest of Fort Payne.
