= Valley Head, Alabama =

- Town
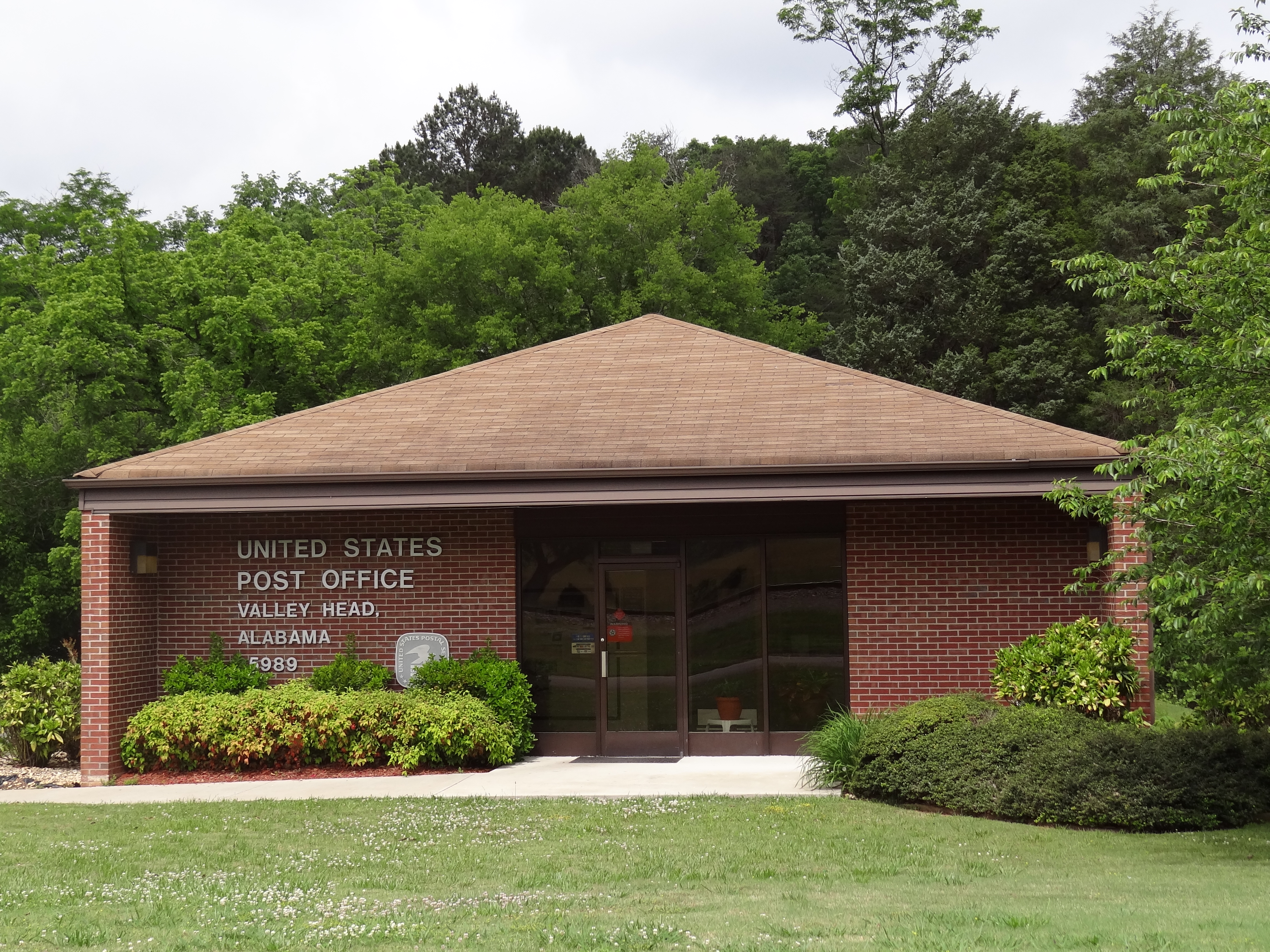
- Post office in Valley Head

- Location of Valley Head in DeKalb County, Alabama.
- Coordinates: 34°33′55″N 85°36′59″W
- Country: United States
- State: Alabama
- County: DeKalb

Area
  - Total: 3.78 sq mi (9.80 km^{2})
  - Land: 3.78 sq mi (9.78 km^{2})
  - Water: 0.0077 sq mi (0.02 km^{2})
- Elevation: 1,063 ft (324 m)

Population (2020)
  - Total: 577
  - Density: 152.8/sq mi (59.01/km^{2})
- Time zone: UTC−6 (Central (CST))
  - Summer (DST): UTC−5 (CDT)
- ZIP code: 35989
- Area code: 256
- FIPS code: 01-78240
- GNIS feature ID: 2406785
- Website: valleyheadalabama.com

Valley Head is a town in DeKalb County, Alabama, United States. Although this town incorporated in 1922, it was also listed as being incorporated on the 1890 U.S. Census. It is part of the Lookout Mountain region. At the 2020 census, its population was 577.

== Geography ==
Valley Head is located at 34°33′55″N 85°36′59″W (34.565301, -85.616426).

According to the U.S. Census Bureau, the town has a total area of 3.5 square miles (9.1 km^{2}), all land.

=== Climate ===
Valley Head has a humid subtropical climate (Köppen Cfa), although it is the coolest place in the state with winter temperatures about 18 °F (10 °C) cooler than on the Gulf Coast, and 56 mornings during the three-month winter falling below freezing. While holding many monthly record lows for Alabama, it falls short of the all-time record low of −27 °F (−33 °C) held by New Market.

Climate data for Valley Head, Alabama (1991–2020 normals, extremes 1893–present)
Month	Jan	Feb	Mar	Apr	May	Jun	Jul	Aug	Sep	Oct	Nov	Dec	Year
Record high °F (°C)	79 (26)	80 (27)	90 (32)	92 (33)	100 (38)	104 (40)	106 (41)	105 (41)	104 (40)	98 (37)	90 (32)	78 (26)	106 (41)
Mean maximum °F (°C)	67.2 (19.6)	71.0 (21.7)	78.0 (25.6)	82.9 (28.3)	86.7 (30.4)	91.2 (32.9)	93.0 (33.9)	93.8 (34.3)	90.7 (32.6)	83.8 (28.8)	76.0 (24.4)	68.5 (20.3)	94.9 (34.9)
Mean daily maximum °F (°C)	48.8 (9.3)	53.0 (11.7)	61.3 (16.3)	70.1 (21.2)	77.1 (25.1)	83.5 (28.6)	86.3 (30.2)	86.0 (30.0)	81.3 (27.4)	71.5 (21.9)	60.3 (15.7)	51.6 (10.9)	69.2 (20.7)
Daily mean °F (°C)	39.3 (4.1)	42.7 (5.9)	49.9 (9.9)	57.8 (14.3)	66.1 (18.9)	73.5 (23.1)	76.8 (24.9)	76.2 (24.6)	70.7 (21.5)	59.8 (15.4)	49.0 (9.4)	42.1 (5.6)	58.7 (14.8)
Mean daily minimum °F (°C)	29.8 (−1.2)	32.4 (0.2)	38.6 (3.7)	45.6 (7.6)	55.0 (12.8)	63.4 (17.4)	67.0 (19.4)	66.4 (19.1)	60.1 (15.6)	48.1 (8.9)	37.7 (3.2)	32.5 (0.3)	48.1 (8.9)
Mean minimum °F (°C)	10.1 (−12.2)	14.7 (−9.6)	19.8 (−6.8)	28.2 (−2.1)	38.5 (3.6)	51.4 (10.8)	57.7 (14.3)	56.3 (13.5)	44.4 (6.9)	30.3 (−0.9)	20.8 (−6.2)	16.3 (−8.7)	8.0 (−13.3)
Record low °F (°C)	−15 (−26)	−18 (−28)	2 (−17)	19 (−7)	29 (−2)	35 (2)	45 (7)	45 (7)	29 (−2)	19 (−7)	−2 (−19)	−8 (−22)	−18 (−28)
Average precipitation inches (mm)	5.51 (140)	5.36 (136)	5.31 (135)	5.17 (131)	4.70 (119)	4.47 (114)	5.22 (133)	3.32 (84)	4.69 (119)	3.69 (94)	4.72 (120)	5.70 (145)	57.86 (1,470)
Average snowfall inches (cm)	1.0 (2.5)	1.3 (3.3)	1.4 (3.6)	0.0 (0.0)	0.0 (0.0)	0.0 (0.0)	0.0 (0.0)	0.0 (0.0)	0.0 (0.0)	0.0 (0.0)	0.3 (0.76)	1.0 (2.5)	5.0 (13)
Average precipitation days (≥ 0.01 in)	11.6	12.1	12.0	10.5	10.3	11.3	11.7	9.4	8.3	7.5	8.8	11.4	124.9
Average snowy days (≥ 0.1 in)	1.2	1.1	0.6	0.0	0.0	0.0	0.0	0.0	0.0	0.0	0.0	0.7	3.6
Source: NOAA

== Demographics ==
Historical population
Census	Pop.	Note	%±
1890	233		—
1930	430		—
1940	439		2.1%
1950	418		−4.8%
1960	424		1.4%
1970	470		10.8%
1980	609		29.6%
1990	577		−5.3%
2000	611		5.9%
2010	558		−8.7%
2020	577		3.4%
U.S. Decennial Census; 2013 Estimate

As of the census of 2000, there were 611 people, 244 households, and 175 families residing in the town. The population density was 175.3 inhabitants per square mile (67.7/km^{2}). There were 269 housing units at an average density of 77.2 per square mile (29.8/km^{2}). The racial makeup of the town was 92.47% White, 2.29% Black or African American, 0.65% Native American, 0.16% Asian, 0.16% Pacific Islander, and 4.26% from two or more races. 2.29% of the population were Hispanic or Latino of any race.

There were 244 households, out of which 28.7% had children under the age of 18 living with them, 54.5% were married couples living together, 14.8% had a female householder with no husband present, and 27.9% were non-families. 25.0% of all households were made up of individuals, and 11.9% had someone living alone who was 65 years of age or older. The average household size was 2.50 and the average family size was 2.98.

In the town, the population was spread out, with 24.2% under the age of 18, 9.3% from 18 to 24, 24.7% from 25 to 44, 25.2% from 45 to 64, and 16.5% who were 65 years of age or older. The median age was 38 years. For every 100 females, there were 85.2 males. For every 100 females age 18 and over, there were 86.7 males.

The median income for a household in the town was $29,013, and the median income for a family was $36,250. Males had a median income of $28,558 versus $17,222 for females. The per capita income for the town was $13,582. About 12.2% of families and 15.9% of the population were below the poverty line, including 21.4% of those under age 18 and 21.5% of those age 65 or over.

== Education ==
Valley Head School, home of the "Tigers", is a member of the DeKalb County School System.

== Notable people ==
- Howard Finster, folk artist
- E. T. York, former director of the Alabama Cooperative Extension Service
