= National Register of Historic Places listings in DeKalb County, Alabama =

Location of DeKalb County in Alabama

This is a list of the National Register of Historic Places listings in DeKalb County, Alabama.

This is intended to be a complete list of the properties and districts on the National Register of Historic Places in DeKalb County, Alabama, United States. Latitude and longitude coordinates are provided for many National Register properties and districts; these locations may be seen together in a Google map.

There are 12 properties and districts listed on the National Register in the county.

This National Park Service list is complete through NPS recent listings posted January 9, 2026.

== Current listings ==
	Name on the Register	Image	Date listed	Location	City or town	Description
1	Alabama Builders' Hardware Manufacturing Company	Alabama Builders' Hardware Manufacturing Company	May 8, 1986 (#86000999)	204 8th St., NE.; also 203 8th St., NE. 34°26′47″N 85°42′57″W	Fort Payne	203 8th represents a boundary increase of October 13, 1992, the Alabama Builder's Hardware Manufacturing Company Complex
2	Alabama Great Southern Railroad Passenger Depot	Alabama Great Southern Railroad Passenger Depot	September 10, 1971 (#71001070)	NE 5th St. 34°26′39″N 85°43′07″W	Fort Payne	
3	Cherokee Plantation	Cherokee Plantation	November 29, 1984 (#84000384)	100 Cherokee Dr., NE. 34°29′13″N 85°40′18″W	Fort Payne	
4	Collinsville Historic District	Collinsville Historic District	March 29, 2006 (#06000181)	Valley Ave., Main St. and Grand Ave. 34°15′49″N 85°51′37″W	Collinsville	
5	Fort Payne Boom Town Historic District	Fort Payne Boom Town Historic District	April 21, 1989 (#89000308)	Roughly Gault St. from 4th St., NE. to 6th St., NE. 34°26′39″N 85°43′10″W	Fort Payne	
6	Fort Payne Main Street Historic District	Fort Payne Main Street Historic District	April 21, 1989 (#89000307)	Roughly Gault Ave. from 2nd St., NE. to 2nd St., NW. 34°26′28″N 85°43′21″W	Fort Payne	
7	Fort Payne Opera House	Fort Payne Opera House	April 28, 1970 (#74002262)	510 Gault Ave., N. 34°26′41″N 85°43′09″W	Fort Payne	
8	Fort Payne Residential Historic District	Fort Payne Residential Historic District	May 4, 1988 (#88000444)	Roughly bounded by Forrest Ave. and Elm St., 5th St. NW., Grand and Alabama Aves., and 4th St., SW. and 2nd St., SW. 34°26′38″N 85°43′24″W	Fort Payne	
9	Dr. J.A. Gorman House	Dr. J.A. Gorman House	February 16, 1996 (#96000045)	Lookout St. 34°34′40″N 85°35′37″W	Mentone	
10	Vance C. Larmore House	Vance C. Larmore House	March 23, 2004 (#04000232)	810 County Road 606; 34°31′49″N 85°39′27″W	Hammondville	
11	Mentone Springs Hotel	Mentone Springs Hotel	October 20, 1983 (#83003445)	State Route 117; 34°34′46″N 85°35′25″W	Mentone	Destroyed by fire in March 2014.
12	Winston Place	Winston Place	March 19, 1987 (#87000476)	Off State Route 117; 34°34′06″N 85°36′51″W	Valley Head	

== See also ==
- List of National Historic Landmarks in Alabama
- National Register of Historic Places listings in Alabama
