= Collinsville Historic District =

Collinsville Historic District may refer to:

- Collinsville Historic District (Collinsville, Alabama), listed on the NRHP in Alabama
- Collinsville Historic District (Collinsville, Connecticut), listed on the NRHP in Connecticut
