= Fort Payne Boom Town Historic District =

Historic district in Alabama, United States

- U.S. National Register of Historic Places
- U.S. Historic district
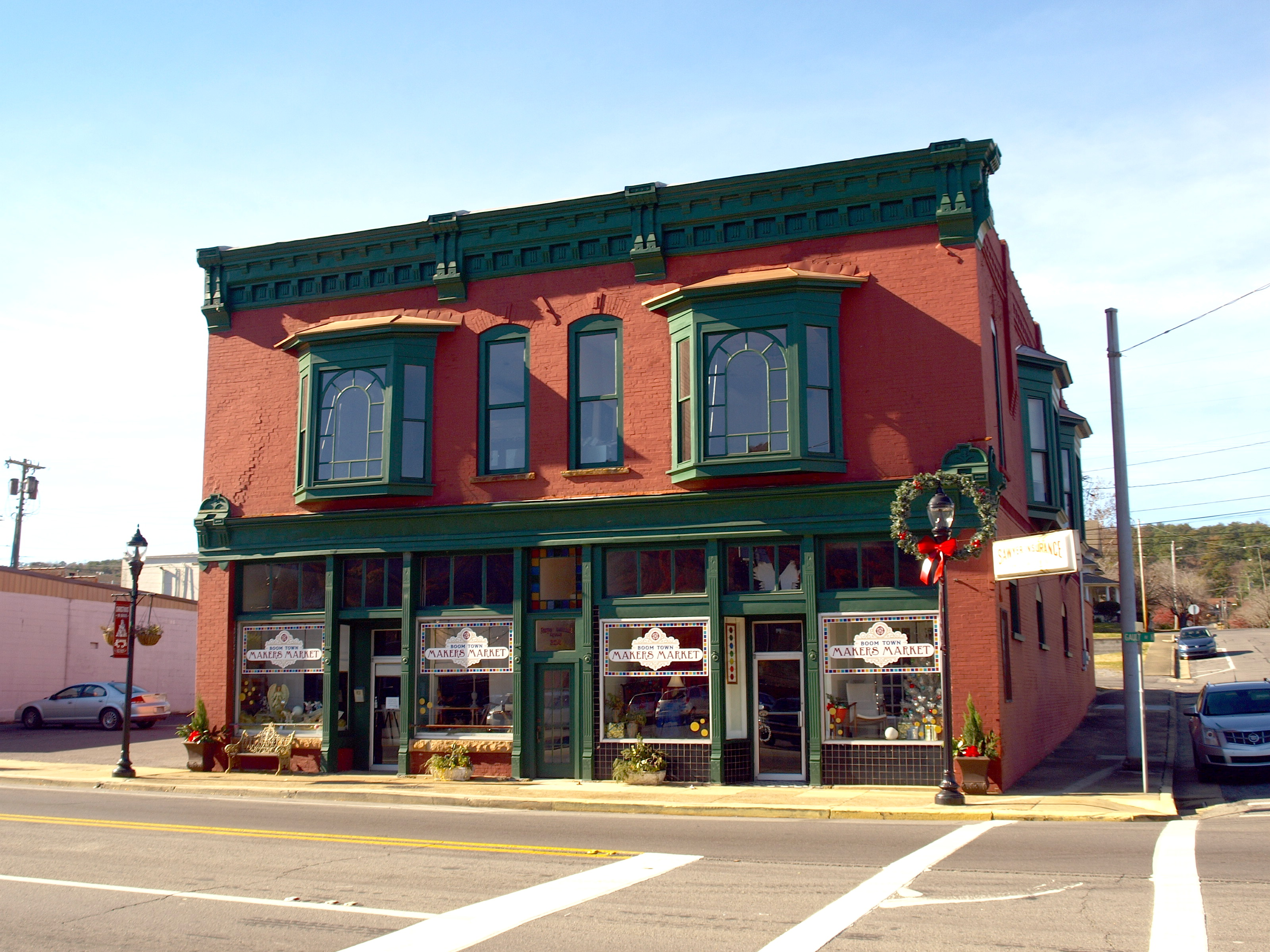
- The Sawyer Building in November 2017

- Location within Alabama Location within the United States
- Location: Roughly Gault St. from 4th St. NE. to 6th St. NE., Fort Payne, Alabama
- Coordinates: 34°26′39″N 85°43′10″W
- Area: 8 acres (3.2 ha)
- Built: 1889
- Architectural style: Late Victorian, Romanesque
- NRHP reference No.: 89000308
- Added to NRHP: April 21, 1989

The Fort Payne Boom Town Historic District is a historic district in Fort Payne, Alabama, United States. The district encompasses five properties built around 1889, when Fort Payne was undergoing huge growth owing to the area's mineral deposits. Included are the Alabama Great Southern Depot; the Fort Payne Opera House; the Sawyer Building, a two-story Victorian commercial building; City Park, which sat across from the (now-demolished) county courthouse; and Purdy Furniture, which built as the headquarters of the Fort Payne Coal and Iron Company. Another Victorian commercial building has since been demolished. The district was listed on the National Register of Historic Places in 1989.
