= Fort Payne Main Street Historic District =

Historic district in Alabama, United States

- U.S. National Register of Historic Places
- U.S. Historic district
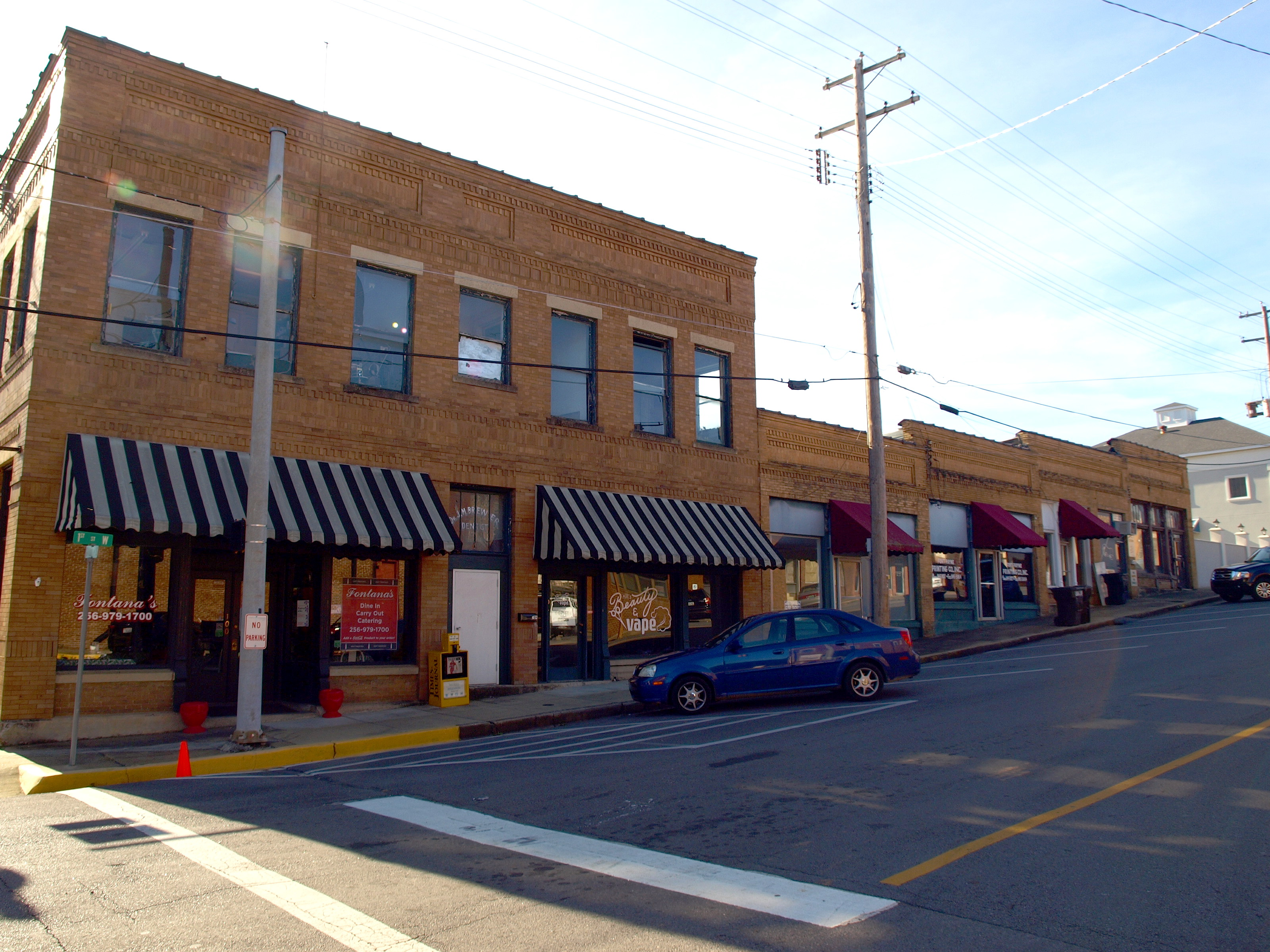
- Buildings on 1st Street in November 2017

- Location within Alabama Location within the United States
- Location: Roughly Gault Ave. from 2nd St. NE. to 2nd St. NW., Fort Payne, Alabama
- Coordinates: 34°26′28″N 85°43′21″W
- Area: 6 acres (2.4 ha)
- Architectural style: Colonial Revival, Moderne
- NRHP reference No.: 89000307
- Added to NRHP: April 21, 1989

The Fort Payne Main Street Historic District is a historic district in Fort Payne, Alabama, United States. Centered on the intersection of Gault Avenue and 1st Street, the district contains commercial and public buildings that date from Fort Payne's second period of growth from the 1920s to World War II. Buildings from the first wave of development in the 1880s and 1890s are centered in the Fort Payne Boom Town Historic District to the northeast. Most of the commercial buildings are in a simple, utilitarian brick style. The later civic buildings exhibit more decorated styles, including the Classical Revival Post Office (built 1936), and the Art Moderne City Hall (1941) and DeKalb County Activities Building (1941). The district was listed on the National Register of Historic Places in 1989.
