= James McKinney (musician) =

American jazz banjo player

James McKinney is recognized as a true master of the 5-string banjo. One of the most advanced players anywhere and a Scruggs and Reno style expert, James is also considered a leading expert in jazz and theory in the banjo world, having been mentored by renowned jazz educator, David Baker, and Mr. Henry Ferrel (teacher of Chet Atkins and Jethro Burns). James McKinney was born in Fort Payne, Alabama in 1957.

In his early days James played often with legends such as Bill Monroe, Vassar Clements, and John Hartford. James won the South U.S. Banjo Championship at age 15 and in 1982 he won the National Banjo Championship at Winfield, Kansas, as well as first-place in dozens of state and regional championships. He made the first of several appearances on the Grand Ole Opry, The Porter Wagoner Show, and the stages of Opryland at age 19 as part of "Smoky Mountain Sunshine" combining his talents as a banjoist with those of musical arranger.

In the 1980s he lived in Dallas and recorded and toured with his band Danger in the Air and later moved to Nashville to do full-time touring and studio work. James spent many years as a popular studio musician in Nashville and performed/recorded with the likes of Porter Wagoner, Barbara Mandrell, John Hartford, and Johnny Cash in addition to a long and close friendship and professional relationship with legendary fiddler, Vassar Clements, with whom he toured and performed as "The Vassar Clements Band".

James has recorded on many projects and taught at many major banjo camps including SPGBMA workshops and other Master workshops all over the USA and in Australia. Today, James lives in Atlanta, GA and has launched a new acoustic group called, "The Night Travelers", together with bassist Niki Portmann. They currently tour and play in the southeast region and are soon to release their first CD project, Campfire.

== Sources ==
- https://web.archive.org/web/20080129164843/http://www.dixie-chicks.com/danger.shtml
- http://www.nighttravelers.com
- https://web.archive.org/web/20061110143818/http://www.wvfest.com/contests/winner.html?winnerid=112
