= Kiss Me Once (disambiguation) =

Kiss Me Once is a 2014 album by Kylie Minogue.

Kiss Me Once may also refer to:

- "Kiss Me Once", a version of 1945 standard It's Been a Long, Long Time by Elvis Presley on the Nashville Outtakes
- "Kiss Me Once", a song by The Everly Brothers written by Don Everly
- "Kiss Me Once", a song by Robin Macy from the 1988 album Danger in the Air
- "Kiss Me Once", a song written by Sia and title track of the Kylie Minogue album
- Kiss Me Once Tour by Kylie Minogue
