= Isbell Field =

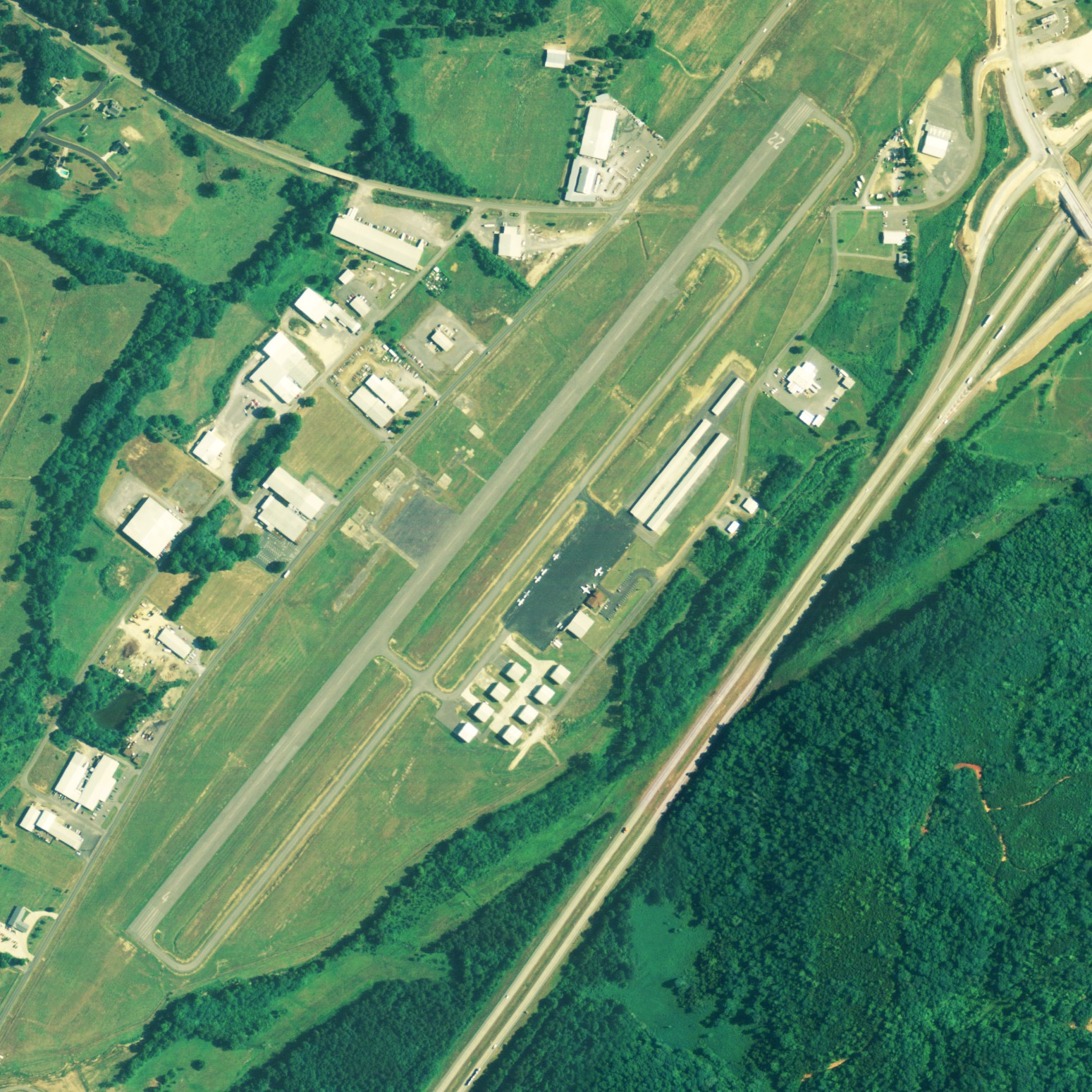
- NAIP aerial image, 15 June 2006
- IATA: none; ICAO: none; FAA LID: 4A9

Summary
- Airport type: Public
- Owner: City of Fort Payne
- Serves: Fort Payne, Alabama
- Elevation AMSL: 877 ft (267 m)
- Coordinates: 34°28′25″N 085°43′17″W
- Interactive map of Isbell Field

Runways
Direction	Length		Surface
Direction	ft	m	Surface
4/22	5,001	1,524	Asphalt

Statistics (2009)
- Aircraft operations: 16,470
- Based aircraft: 56
- Source: Federal Aviation Administration

Isbell Field (FAA LID: 4A9) is a city-owned public-use airport located two nautical miles (3.7 km) north of the central business district of Fort Payne, a city in DeKalb County, Alabama, United States. According to the FAA's National Plan of Integrated Airport Systems for 2009–2013, it is categorized as a general aviation facility.

== Facilities and aircraft ==
Isbell Field covers an area of 126 acres (51 ha) at an elevation of 877 feet (267 m) above mean sea level. It has one runway designated 4/22 with an asphalt surface measuring 5,001 by 100 feet (1,524 x 30 m).

For the 12-month period ending May 12, 2009, the airport had 16,470 general aviation aircraft operations, an average of 45 per day. At that time there were 56 aircraft based at this airport: 82% single-engine, 13% multi-engine and 5% jet.

It was named for John Birdwell Isbell, U.S. Attorney for the Northern District of Alabama.

== See also ==
- List of airports in Alabama
