= Mentone Springs Hotel =

- U.S. National Register of Historic Places
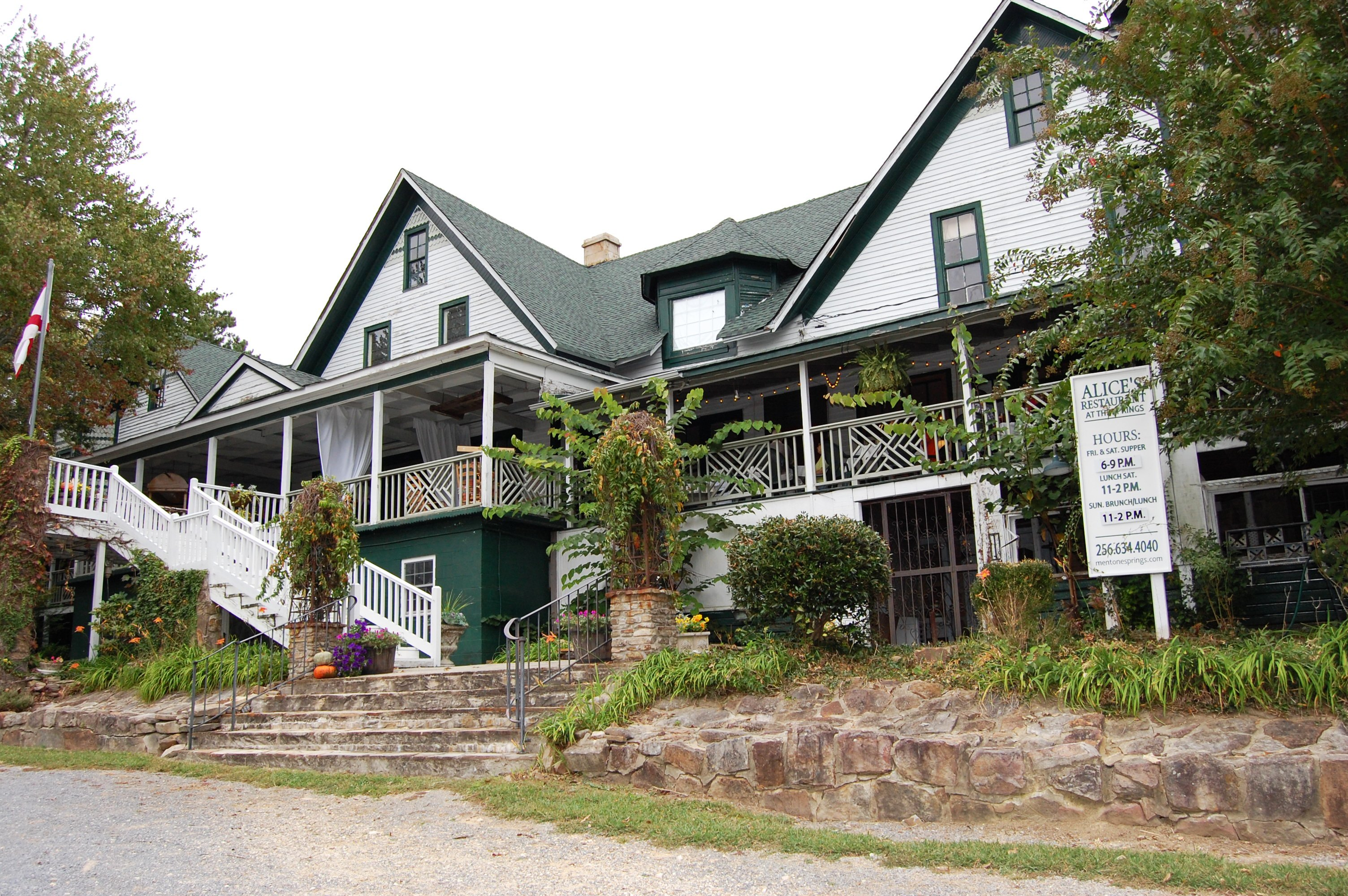
- The Mentone Springs Hotel stood in Mentone, Alabama for 130 years.

- Location within Alabama Location within the United States
- Location: Mentone, Alabama
- Coordinates: 34°34′46″N 85°35′25″W
- Built: 1884–87
- Architectural style: Queen Anne
- NRHP reference No.: 83003445
- Added to NRHP: October 20, 1983

The Mentone Springs Hotel was a hotel in Mentone, Alabama, United States. It was the last remaining large-scale resort hotel in Alabama from the late 19th century. The hotel burned to the ground after an electrical fire on March 1, 2014.

== History ==
The hotel was built from 1884 to 1887 by J. Frank Caldwell, a physician from Pennsylvania who had vacationed in the area. On the property are two springs, Mineral Springs and Beauty Springs. The hotel and town were named after the French resort town of Menton. The area gained in popularity among tourists in the 1890s, due largely to the cooler temperatures and scenery of the Ridge-and-Valley Appalachians. In 1915 the hotel was renovated and an annex built, adding 27 rooms. Through the Great Depression to the 1970s, the hotel went into decline, saddled with debt and bouncing between owners. It ceased operating in 1950 and was later converted to a private residence and organ repair shop. The hotel reopened in 2001, and underwent an extensive restoration in 2010–11. An antique store occupied the 1915 annex.
