= Dr. J. A. Gorman House =

Historic house in Alabama, United States

- U.S. National Register of Historic Places
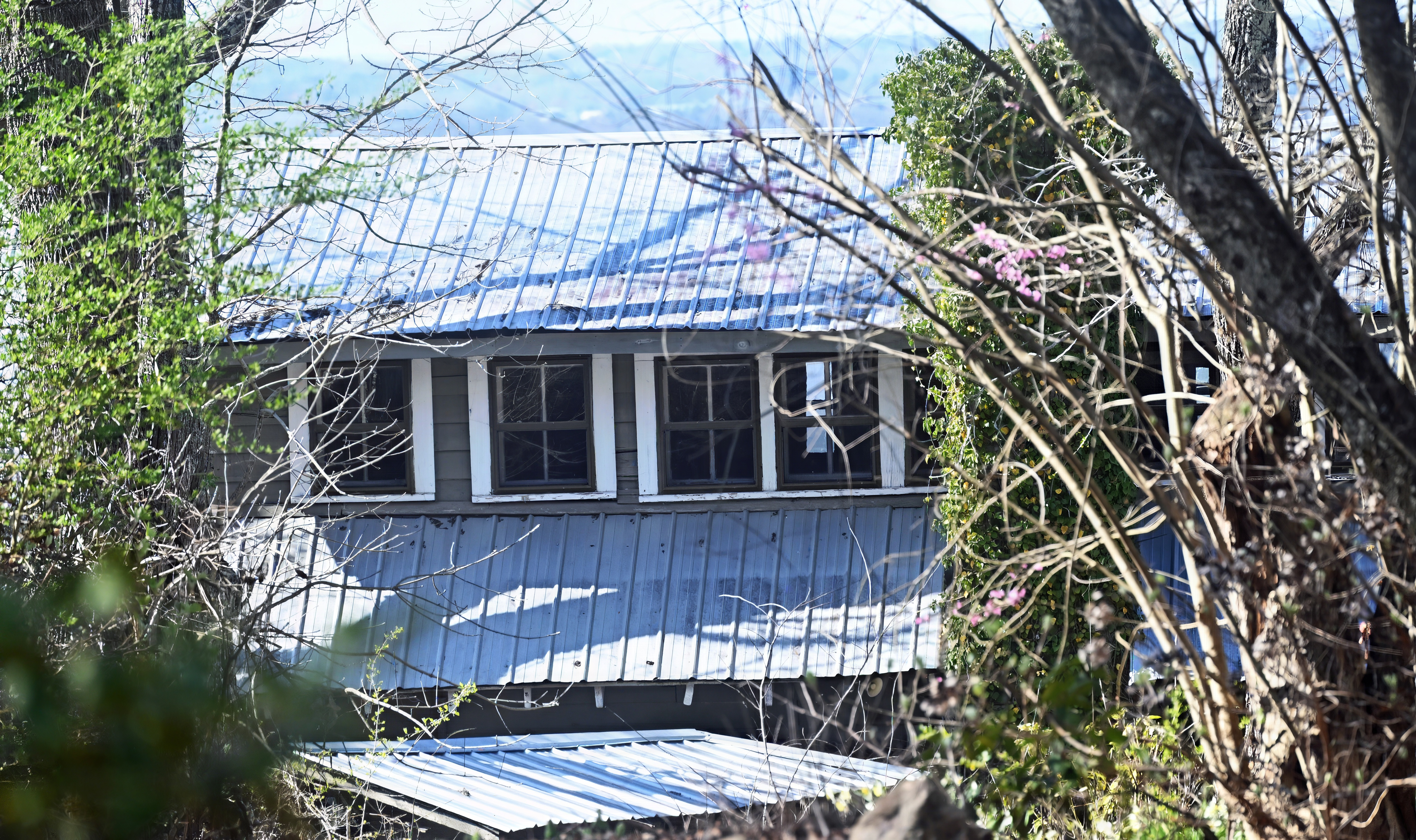
- The house in 2025

- Location within Alabama Location within the United States
- Location: Lookout St., Mentone, Alabama
- Coordinates: 34°34′40″N 85°35′37″W
- Area: 0.8 acres (0.32 ha)
- Built: 1922
- Architectural style: Bungalow/craftsman
- NRHP reference No.: 96000045
- Added to NRHP: February 16, 1996

The Dr. J. A. Gorman House (also known as the Hanging Cottage) is a historic residence in Mentone, Alabama, United States. The house was built as a vacation home by Dr. Gorman in 1922. In 1944 Gorman sold the house to local physician W. T. Cantrell, who practiced medicine in the house until 1979. It got its nickname, the "Hanging Cottage", from its position on the brow of Lookout Mountain. Part of the bungalow's foundation is a 22-foot (6.7-m) high rock wall on the brow side. The house takes advantage of its view with 55 windows and a 15-foot (4.5-m) wide porch wrapping around the house. The materials on the house also blend with the surroundings, such as its use of log timbers as porch supports and hand-cut stone chimney. The house was listed on the National Register of Historic Places in 1996.
