= Weston Burt =

American country music singer

- Born: Fort Payne, Alabama
- Genres: Country
- Occupation: Singer
- Instrument(s): Vocals, guitar
- Years active: 2013–present
- Labels: HitShop
- Website: westonburt.com

Weston Burt (born in Fort Payne, Alabama) is an American country music singer. Burt is the flagship artist for HitShop Records, a record label distributed by Warner Music Nashville.

== Career ==
Burt's debut single, "Lucky Sometimes," was released in March 2013. Billy Dukes of Taste of Country gave the song four stars out of five, writing that "it's performed with the confidence and conviction from someone who expects to be around for awhile." It charted for ten weeks on the Billboard Country Airplay chart, peaking at number 55 in July 2013. The song's music video premiered on CMT in June 2013. The song was included on an extended play, also titled Lucky Sometimes, which was released in June 2013. A second single, "Smile That Smile," was released in October 2013.

== Discography ==
=== Extended plays ===
Title	Album details	Peak chart positions	
Title	Album details	US Country	US Heat
Lucky Sometimes	Release date: June 25, 2013; Label: HitShop/Warner Music Nashville	56	30

=== Singles ===
Year	Single	Peak positions	Album
Year	Single	US Country Airplay	Album
2013	"Lucky Sometimes"	55	Lucky Sometimes
2013	"Smile That Smile"	60	Lucky Sometimes

=== Music videos ===
Year	Video	Director
2013	"Lucky Sometimes"	Stokes Nielson
2013	"Smile That Smile"	Stokes Nielson
