= Duward Crow =

United States Air Force general

Duward L. Crow
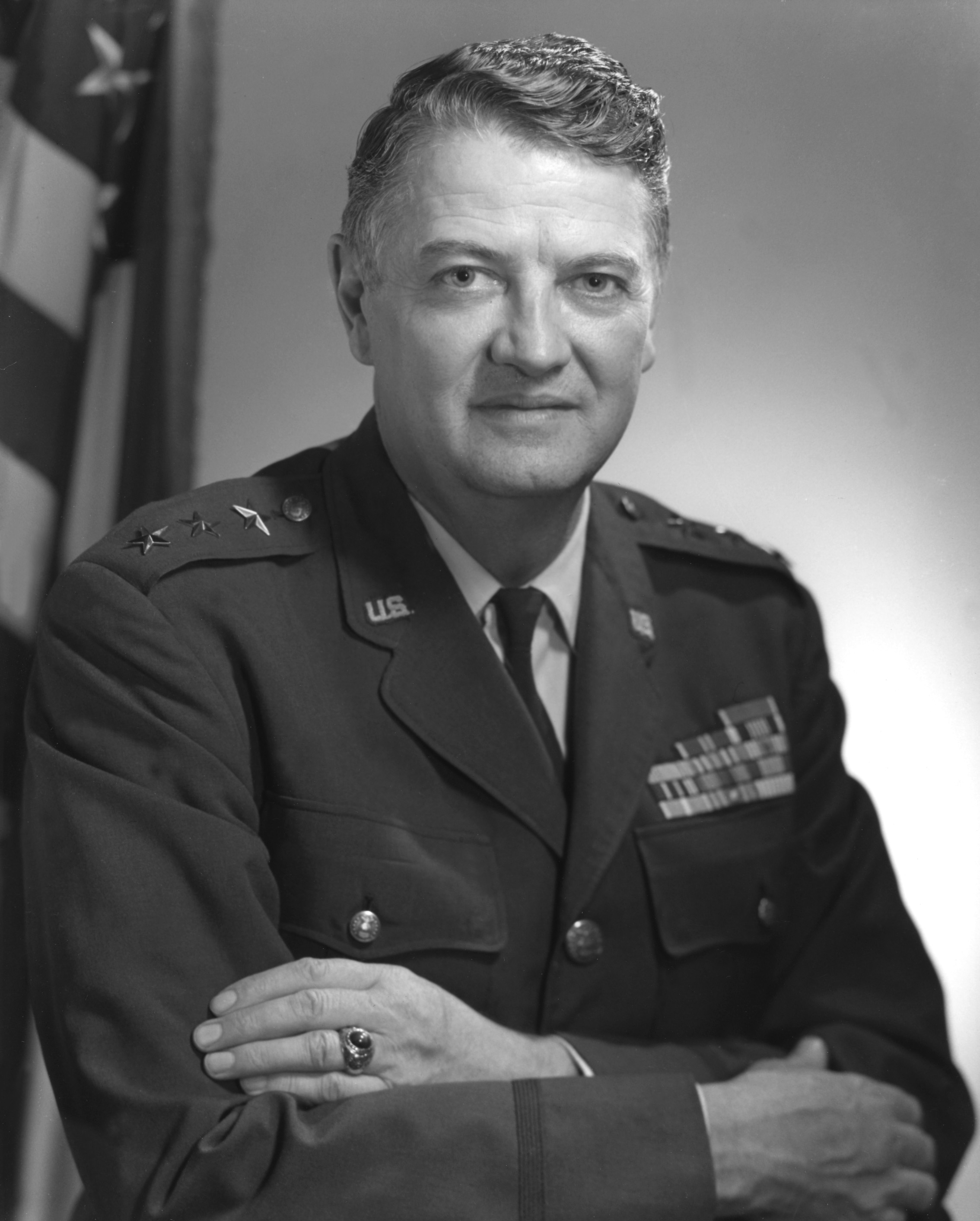
- Born: June 26, 1919; Fort Payne, Alabama
- Died: October 29, 1997 (aged 78)
- Military career
- Allegiance: United States of America
- Branch: United States Air Force
- Rank: Lieutenant general

Duward Lowery Crow (June 26, 1919 – October 29, 1997) was a United States Air Force lieutenant general.

Crow graduated from DeKalb County High School in 1936 and entered the University of Alabama. He subsequently received an appointment to the U.S. Military Academy, in West Point, New York, graduating in 1941, and joined what was then the Army Air Corps. He served in the China-Burma-India theater of operations during World War II. Crow was involved in planning and executing airborne resupply operations over the Himalayan Mountains to Chinese Nationalists and other allied forces, commonly known as The Hump operation.

Following the war, Crow enrolled at Harvard University, where he was awarded a master of business administration degree in 1948. He then spent several years in various posts dealing with supply, procurement, logistics, finance and personnel matters. He attended the Air War College at Maxwell Air Force Base in Montgomery, Alabama, from 1957 to 58. On October 1, 1973, Crow was appointed Assistant Vice Chief of Staff of the Air Force. He retired from the Air Force on August 1, 1974. He was subsequently named Associate Deputy Administrator of NASA in 1975.

During his military career, Crow was awarded the Distinguished Service Medal, Legion of Merit, Bronze Star Medal, and the Army Commendation Medal. He was subsequently awarded the NASA Distinguished Service Medal in 1978.

Crow died on October 29, 1997.
