= Fort Payne Residential Historic District =

Historic district in Alabama, United States

- U.S. National Register of Historic Places
- U.S. Historic district
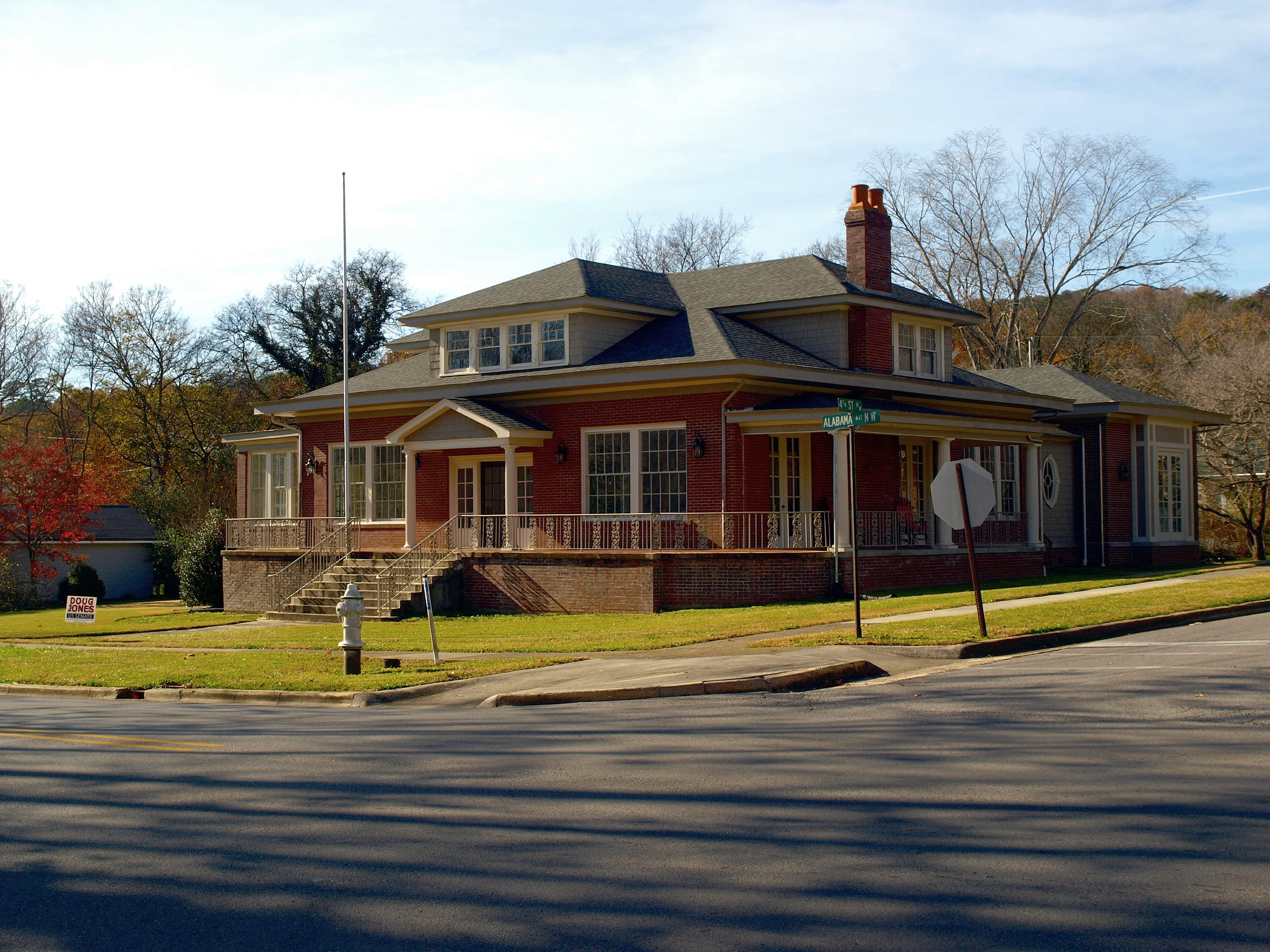
- 308 Alabama Avenue in November 2017

- Location within Alabama Location within the United States
- Location: Roughly bounded by Forrest Ave. and Elm St., Fifth St. NW, Grand and Alabama Aves., and Fourth St. SW and Second St. NW, Fort Payne, Alabama
- Coordinates: 34°26′38″N 85°43′24″W
- Area: 34 acres (14 ha)
- Architectural style: Late 19th And Early 20th Century American Movements, Late 19th And 20th Century Revivals, Queen Anne
- NRHP reference No.: 88000444
- Added to NRHP: May 4, 1988

The Fort Payne Residential Historic District is a historic district in Fort Payne, Alabama, United States. The district represents both of Fort Payne's major periods of growth: the 1880s and 1890s, fueled by the area's mineral deposits; and the 1910s through the 1930s, bolstered by the development of the hosiery industry. The area was predominantly middle class, meaning only a few Queen Anne homes were built; most houses from the early period were built in more restrained Vernacular Victorian styles. Later construction is dominated by American Foursquares and Craftsman Bungalows. The district was listed on the National Register of Historic Places in 1988.
