= W. B. Davis Hosiery Mill =

- Alabama Builders' Hardware Manufacturing Company
- U.S. National Register of Historic Places
- Alabama Register of Landmarks and Heritage
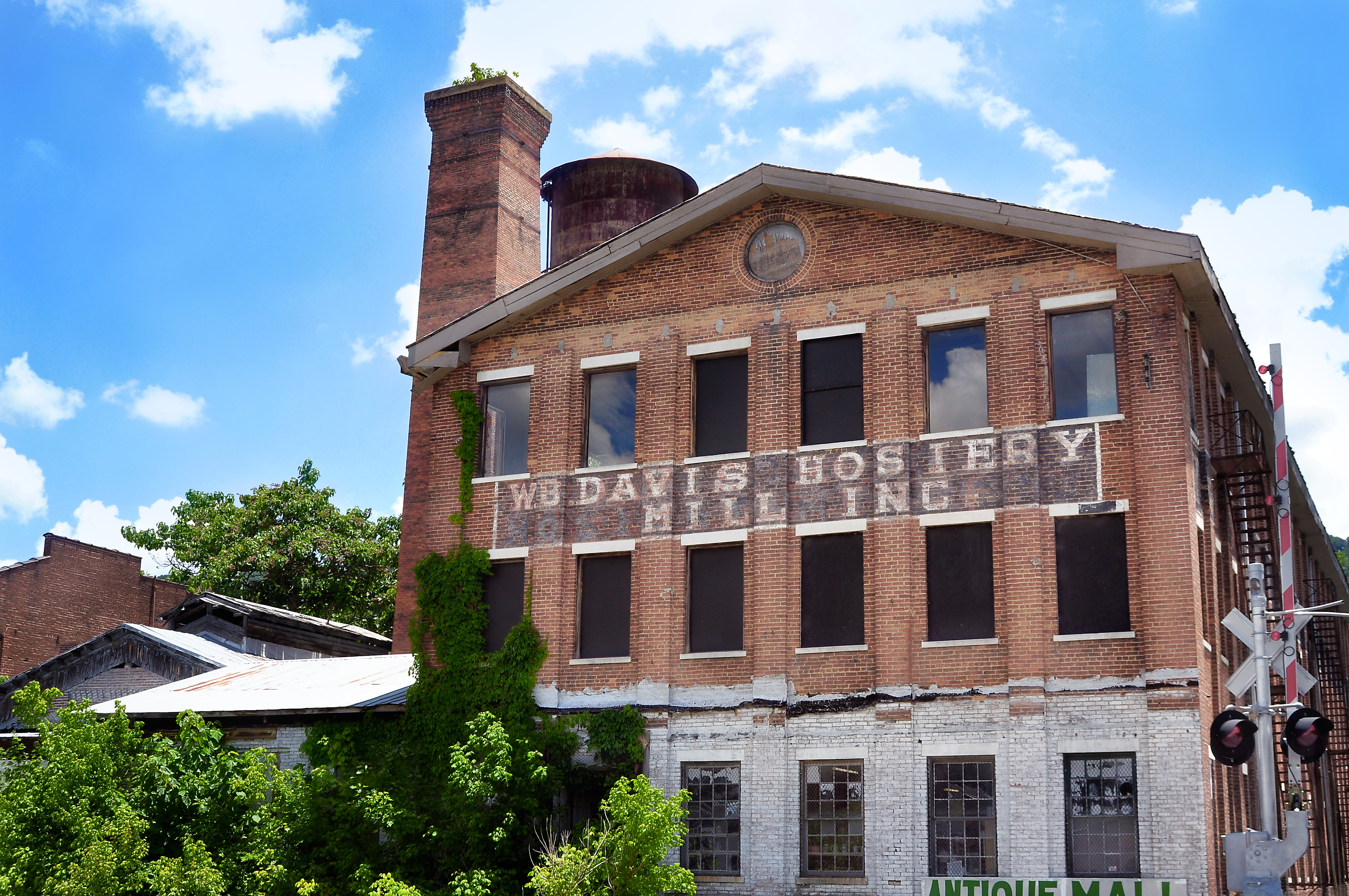

- Location within Alabama Location within the United States
- Location: 203 & 204 Eighth St. NE, Fort Payne, Alabama
- Coordinates: 34°26′47″N 85°42′57″W
- Area: 2 acres (0.81 ha)
- Built: 1884
- Architectural style: Colonial Revival
- NRHP reference No.: 86000999 (original); 92000637 (increase)

Significant dates
- Added to NRHP: May 8, 1986
- Boundary increase: October 13, 1992
- Designated ARLH: July 19, 1976

The W. B. Davis Hosiery Mill (also known as the Alabama Builders' Hardware Manufacturing Company Complex) is a historic industrial complex in Fort Payne, Alabama, United States. It opened in 1884 in the midst of Fort Payne's economic boom, manufacturing building hardware and supplies. The main building, which features Colonial Revival details, is three stories tall, with 12-over-12 sash windows on each floor. An 85-foot (26-meter) chimney has a flared top and corbeled brick course, imitating a doric order column. By 1890, hopes that large quantities of iron ore and other minerals would be discovered in the Fort Payne district proved to be ill-founded. The ABHMC and seven of Fort Payne's other large manufacturers merged in an effort to remain in business, but they were unable to avoid bankruptcy.

The mill building was purchased in 1909 by hosiery executive W. B. Davis, and converted it into a factory providing ribbing, knitting, and looping. The operation was soon expanded to include dyeing, shaping, and packaging, as it became the largest employer in Fort Payne and gave the town its nickname of the "Sock Capital of the World". The factory underwent a large expansion beginning in 1927, including a large wing off of the main building, a knitting building, an expanded boiler room, other storage buildings, and an annex across the street. In 1948 the company was sold, and in 1974 a new building was constructed adjacent with production moved out of the original building.

The complex was listed on the Alabama Register of Landmarks and Heritage in 1976 and the National Register of Historic Places in 1986. The Annex was added to the National Register listing in 1992.
