= Vance C. Larmore House =

Historic house in Alabama, United States

- U.S. National Register of Historic Places
- Alabama Register of Landmarks and Heritage
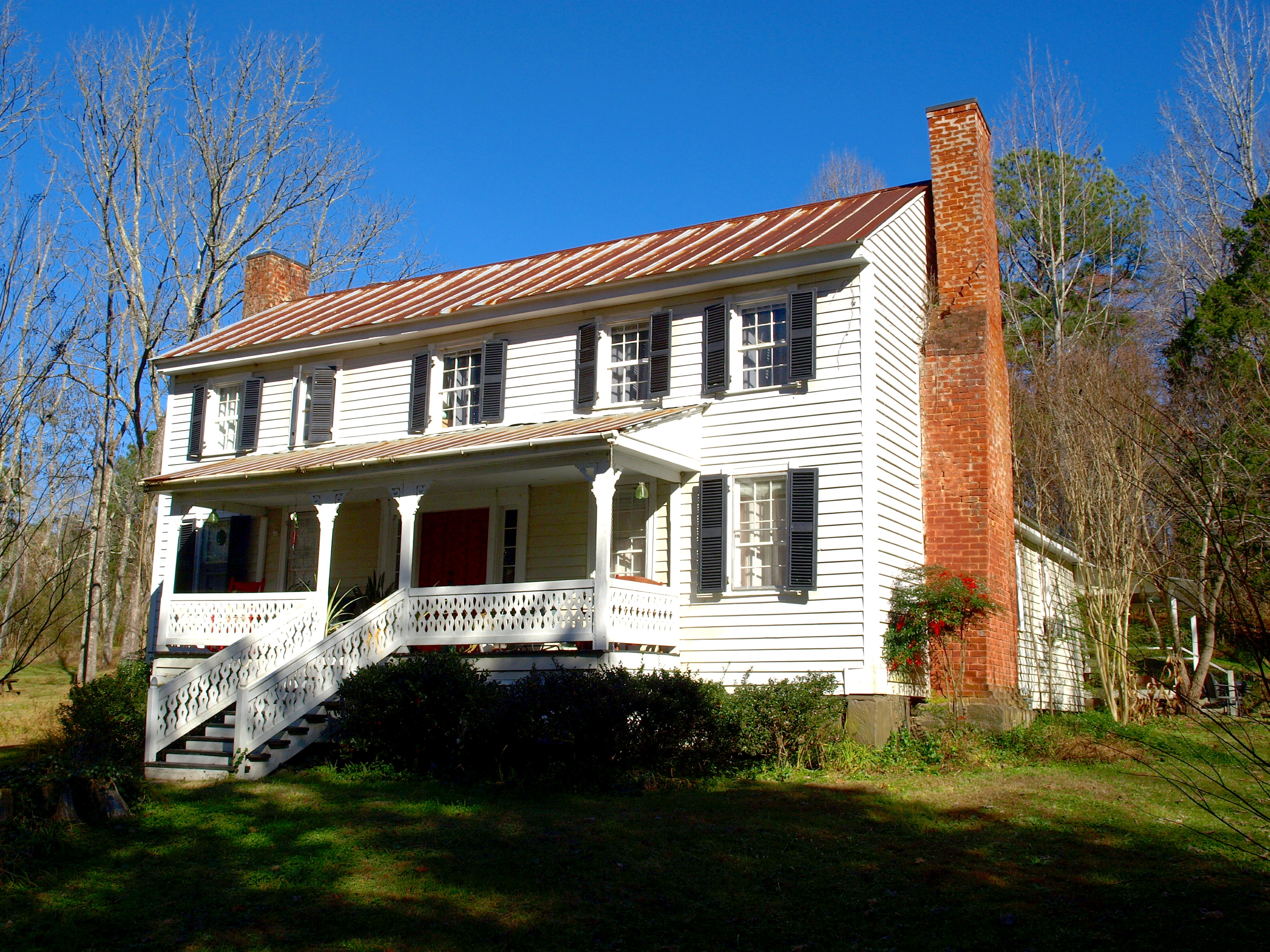
- The house in November 2017

- Location within Alabama Location within the United States
- Nearest city: Hammondville, Alabama
- Coordinates: 34°31′49″N 85°39′27″W
- Area: 3.5 acres (1.4 ha)
- Built: 1845
- Architectural style: I-house
- NRHP reference No.: 04000232

Significant dates
- Added to NRHP: March 23, 2004
- Designated ARLH: January 31, 1979

The Vance C. Larmore House is a historic residence near Hammondville, Alabama, United States. Larmore came to DeKalb County from Abingdon, Virginia, around 1838. One of the earliest white settlers in the county following the Cherokee removal, he built one of the largest farms in the mountainous area, amassing 1700 acres (690 ha) by 1860. In the mid-1840s, Larmore built a two-story I-house, a vernacular form brought from the East to what was then the frontier. The house is clad in clapboard, and has a Victorian-detailed front porch, which was a later addition. The interior has a center-hall plan on each floor, as well as a one-story ell off the rear, containing a kitchen and dining room. The house was listed on the Alabama Register of Landmarks and Heritage in 1979 and the National Register of Historic Places in 2004.
