= Collinsville Historic District (Collinsville, Alabama) =

Historic district in Alabama, United States

- U.S. National Register of Historic Places
- U.S. Historic district
- Location within Alabama Location within the United States
- Location: Valley Ave., Main St. and Grand Ave., Collinsville, Alabama
- Coordinates: 34°15′49″N 85°51′37″W
- Area: 60 acres (24 ha)
- Architectural style: Late Victorian, Classical Revival
- NRHP reference No.: 06000181
- Added to NRHP: March 29, 2006

The Collinsville Historic District is a historic district in Collinsville, Alabama, United States. After the Cherokee were removed in 1835, Collinsville was founded on land owned by Alfred Collins, a settler from Rhea County, Tennessee. By 1848, he held title to over 680 acres (275 ha). In 1852, construction began on the Wills Valley Railroad, running through Collinsville between Chattanooga, and Elyton (present-day Birmingham); the company was renamed to the Alabama Great Southern Railroad in 1877. The town began to grow, and was incorporated in 1887. Two fires in 1884 and 1900 destroyed most of the commercial buildings, and floods also plagued the town; a levee on Little Wills Creek was constructed in 1937 by the Works Progress Administration. The historic district is primarily residential with the remainder commercial, as well as two churches, a garage, two industrial buildings, three bridges, and the levee. Commercial buildings are mostly built in simple, commercial styles, and nearly all date from after the 1900 fire. Notable is the Art Moderne Cricket Theatre, built in 1946. The majority of houses date from 1891 through 1930, many of which are Queen Anne and Late Victorian, American Craftsman, and Vernacular styles. The district was listed on the National Register of Historic Places in 2006.
