= Fort Payne Depot Museum =

Historic railroad depot in Fort Payne, Alabama, US

- Alabama Great Southern Railroad Passenger Depot
- U.S. National Register of Historic Places
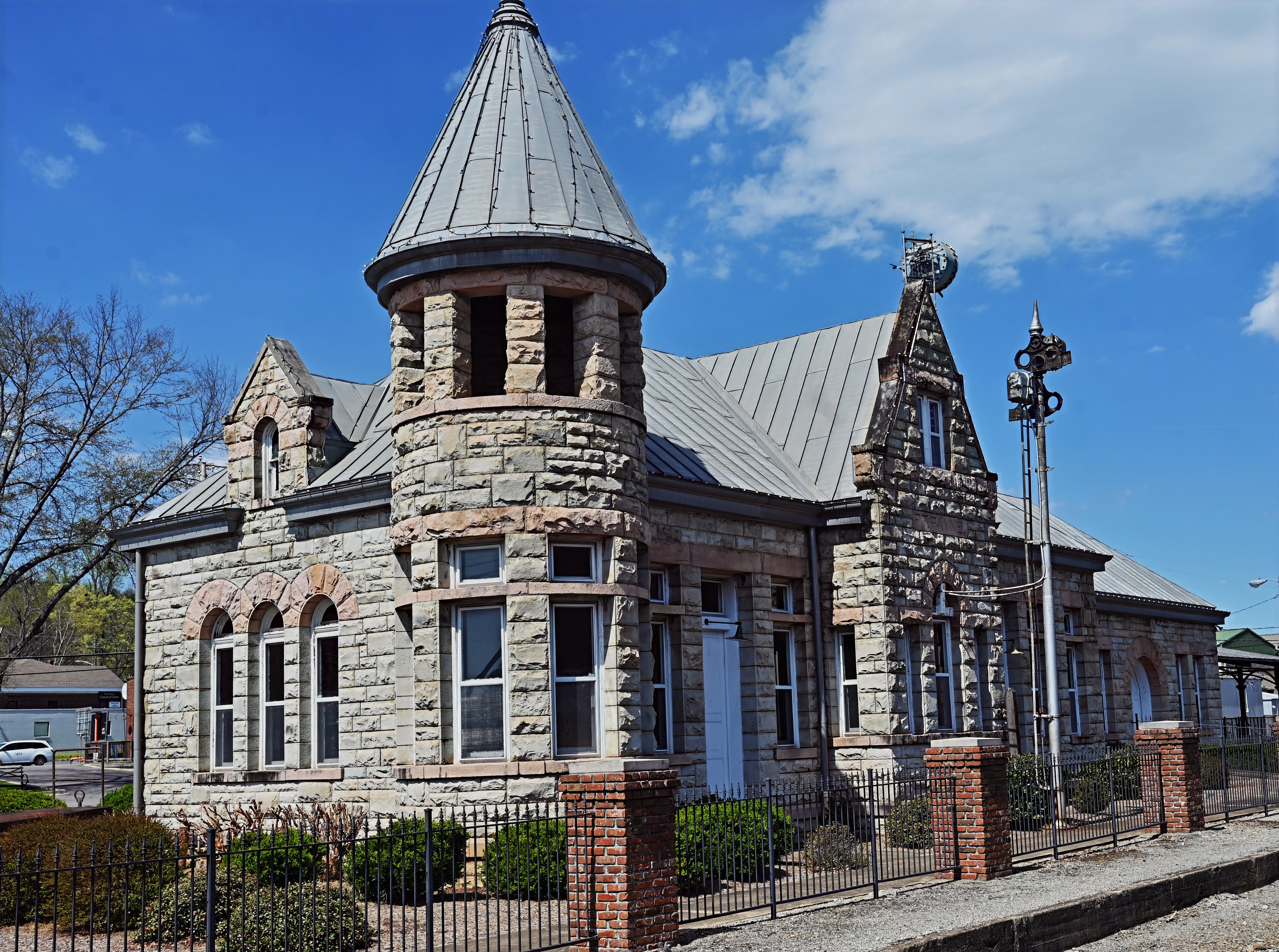

- Location within Alabama Location within the United States
- Location: NE 5th St., Fort Payne, Alabama
- Coordinates: 34°26′39″N 85°43′7″W
- Area: 0.8 acres (0.32 ha)
- Built: 1891
- Architect: Charles C. Taylor
- Architectural style: Richardsonian Romanesque
- NRHP reference No.: 71001070
- Added to NRHP: September 10, 1971

The Fort Payne Depot Museum (formerly the Alabama Great Southern Railroad Passenger Depot) is a historic building in Fort Payne, Alabama, United States. The depot was built by the Alabama Great Southern Railroad in 1891, at the height of Fort Payne's mining-driven boom. Passenger service ended in 1970, but the depot continued to service freight until 1983. It was converted into a museum in 1986, which includes exhibits with 19th century and Native American artifacts, a collection of dioramas of fantasy scenes and historical events, and a former Norfolk Southern caboose. The depot was designed in Richardsonian Romanesque style by architect Charles C. Taylor. It is clad in grey sandstone with pink granite trim. The hipped roof has several gables protruding from it, as well as a circular tower on one corner. The depot was listed on the National Register of Historic Places in 1971.

Preceding station	Southern Railway	Following station
Collinsville toward New Orleans	New Orleans – Cincinnati	Valley Head toward Cincinnati
