= Fort Payne Opera House =

Historic opera house in Fort Payne, Alabama, US

- U.S. National Register of Historic Places
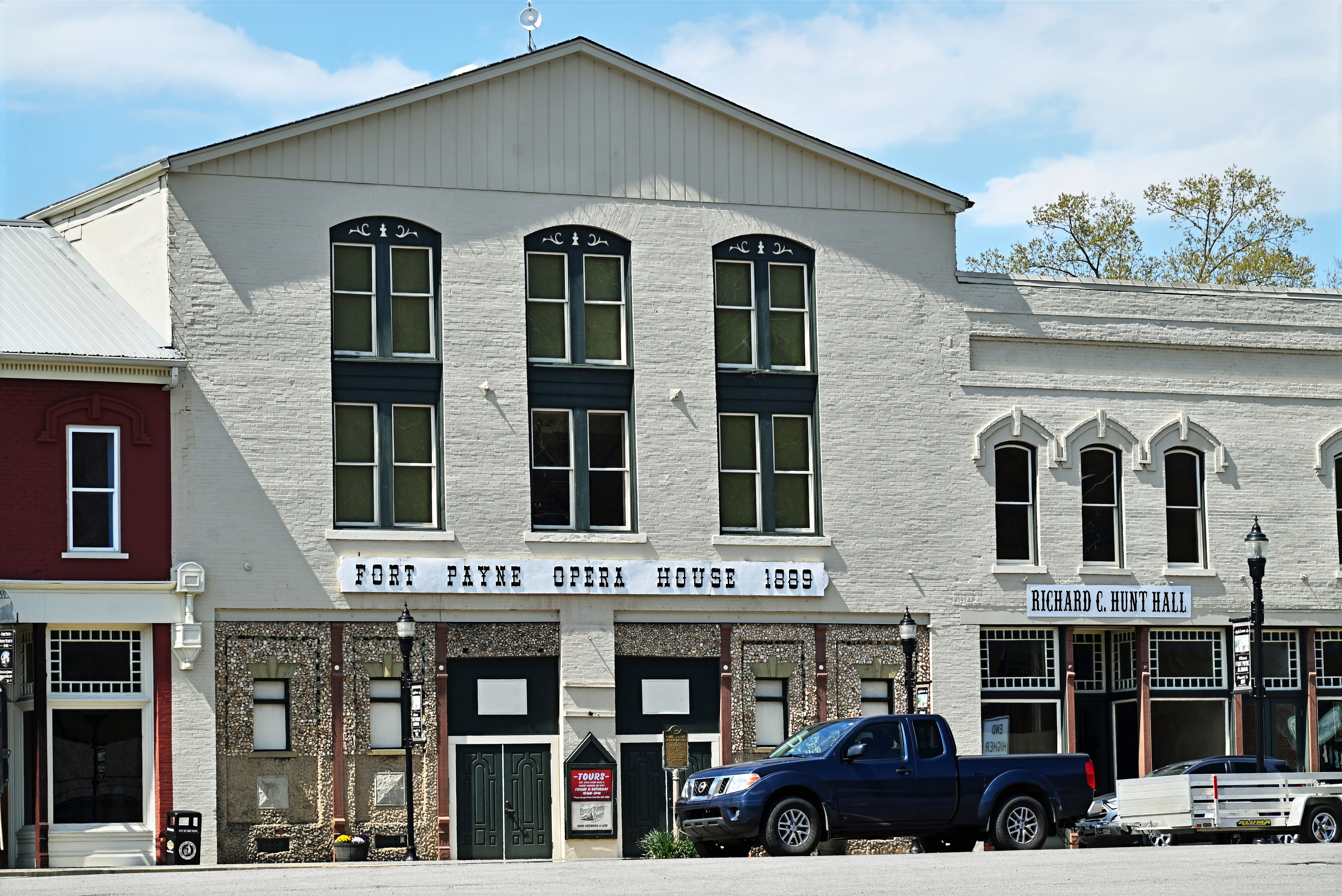

- Location within Alabama Location within the United States
- Location: 510 Gault Ave. N, Fort Payne, Alabama
- Coordinates: 34°26′41″N 85°43′9″W
- Area: 0.2 acres (0.081 ha)
- Built: 1889
- NRHP reference No.: 74002262
- Added to NRHP: April 28, 1970

The Fort Payne Opera House, located at 510 Gault Avenue North in Fort Payne, Alabama, United States, was built during the industrial boom in 1889. The Fort Payne Opera House is the only one in the state still in use. The establishment has been used as a movie theater, live theater and a public forum. The Opera House still hosts live theatrical events and is on the National Register of Historic Places and the National Register of 19th Century Theaters in America. Completely restored, the Opera House is a cultural center of the community.
