= Danger in the Air =

- Origin: Dallas, Texas, United States
- Genre: Bluegrass
- Label: Crystal Clear Sound
- Past members: Robin Lynn Macy; Drew Garrett; Andy Owens; James McKinney; Stephan Dudash

Danger in the Air was a regional bluegrass band based in the Dallas-Fort Worth area. It is best known as the band in which Robin Lynn Macy performed while simultaneously founding the all-female group the Dixie Chicks in 1989.

The band was founded by Drew Garrett (bass) and Andy Owens (mandolin), both of whom were established bluegrass musicians. The original group also included Robin Macy on guitar and vocals. James McKinney joined the group early in 1986 on banjo. Stephan Dudash (5-string viola) was a late addition. As a five-piece, the band won first place at several regional competitions and placed fourth in the Society for the Preservation of Bluegrass Music of America (SPBGMA) band contest in Nashville.

Danger in the Air released two cassettes: a self-titled recording and Airtight.

In 1990, the band dissolved, due in part to Macy's commitments to the fledgling band, The Dixie Chicks, which she co-founded in 1989. James McKinney moved to Nashville where he continued to perform using the band's name. After dropping the name in 2003, he and his wife performed as the James & Angela McKinney Band. Angela McKinney has since pursued a solo career.

Garrett eventually moved to Colorado where he worked as a sound engineer and producer. He currently plays the bass for the bluegrass quartet Blue Canyon Boys.

Owens remains active in bluegrass circles. He introduced Macy to the Erwin sisters and recorded their three-track demo. His Andy Owens Project released several CDs. He recorded and toured with Druha Trava in 2007. Owens also served as chairman of the board of the International Bluegrass Music Association in addition to continuing to perform, produce, and engineer recordings.

Dudash continues to record and perform. He released Mango Django in 2004.

Macy eventually left the Chicks over a dispute in musical direction. She eventually moved to Kansas where she is the owner of the Bartlett Arboretum in Belle Plaine. She teaches mathematics at the Wichita Collegiate School in Wichita.

== Band line-up ==
- Drew Garrett – bass;
- Robin Lynn Macy – guitar, vocals
- Andy Owens – Mandolin, vocals
- James McKinney – banjo
- Stephan Dudash – viola, vocals

== Discography ==
=== Danger in the Air (1988) ===
Self-released Cassette
Produced and arranged by Danger in the Air
Recorded at TMPS Studios, Austin, Texas, by Larry Seyer
Drew Garrett, Bass; James McKinney, Banjo; Andy Owens, Mandolin; Robin Lynn Macy, Guitar; Stephan Dudash, Fiddle.

Tracks
1. Bluegrass Show (Jim Messina)
2. The Letter (W. Thompson (The Box Tops))
3. Sweetheart of the Pines (Emmylou Harris)
4. Salt Creek (Traditional)
5. Big Train (from Memphis) (John Fogerty)
6. Minor Swing (Reinhardt/Grappelli)
7. Danger in the Air (Steve Hartz)
8. Train 45 (Traditional)

=== Airtight (1990) ===
Self-released Cassette
Produced and arranged by Danger in the Air
Recorded at Omega Audio, Dallas, Texas, by Bil VornDick, assisted by Philip Barrett
Drew Garrett, Bass; James McKinney, Banjo; Andy Owens, Mandolin; Robin Lynn Macy, Guitar; Stephan Dudash, Fiddle.

Tracks
1. In The Pines (Jimmy Davis/Bill Monroe)
2. Love Light (Stephan Dudash)
3. It Don't Matter (Robin Macy)
4. Revel in the Glory (Andy Owens)
5. Storm Out on the Sea (Robin Macy/Mary Neal Northcut)
6. In Despair (Joe Ahr)
7. I'm a Believer (Neil Diamond)
8. Kiss Me Once (Robin Macy)
9. Bounce (James McKinney)
10. My Baby Thinks He's a Train (Leroy Preston)
11. Prisoner Without Love (Stephan Dudash)
