= Fort Payne, Alabama =

City in and county seat of DeKalb County, Alabama, US

Fort Payne
- City
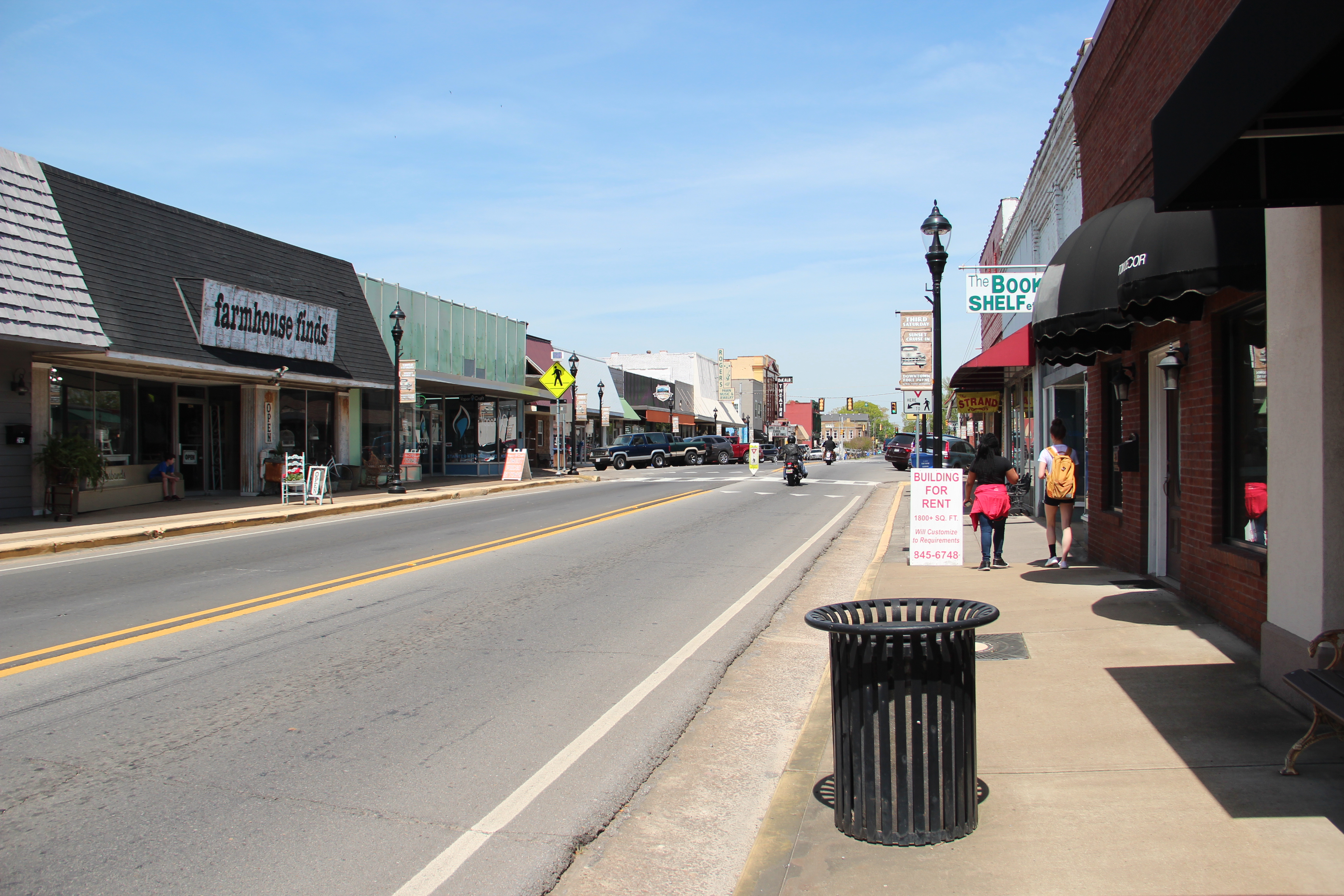
- Gault Avenue in downtown Fort Payne

- Flag logo
- Nickname: Official Sock Capital of the World
- Location of Fort Payne in DeKalb County, Alabama.
- Coordinates: 34°27′13″N 85°42′23″W
- Country: United States
- State: Alabama
- County: DeKalb
- Established: 1889

Government
  - Type: Mayor-Council (5 members)
  - Mayor: Brian Baine

Area
  - Total: 56.76 sq mi (147.01 km^{2})
  - Land: 56.41 sq mi (146.09 km^{2})
  - Water: 0.36 sq mi (0.92 km^{2})
- Elevation: 1,079 ft (329 m)

Population (2020)
  - Total: 14,877
  - Density: 263.7/sq mi (101.83/km^{2})
- Time zone: UTC-6 (Central (CST))
  - Summer (DST): UTC-5 (CDT)
- ZIP code: 35967-35968
- Area code: 256
- FIPS code: 01-27616
- GNIS feature ID: 2403645
- Website: www.fortpayne.org

Fort Payne is a city in and the county seat of DeKalb County, in northeastern Alabama, United States. It is near Lookout Mountain. At the 2020 census, the population was 14,877.

This city developed around a fort of the same name, built in the 1830s to intern the Cherokee tribe who were being rounded up by the military before being forcibly removed to Indian Territory in 1838 on what they called the Trail of Tears.

European-American settlers gradually developed a community around the former fort. It grew rapidly in the late 19th century based on industrial resources, and manufacturing increased in the early 20th century. At the beginning of the 21st century, it still had 7000 workers in 100 mills producing varieties of socks, nearly half the world production. The volume of production has declined because of competition from China.

== History ==
In the late 18th and early 19th centuries, this was the site of Willstown, an important town of the Lower Cherokee. They had moved south along the Tennessee River and into what became Alabama in an effort to escape European-American pressure.

For a time this was the home of Sequoyah, a silversmith who by 1821 created the Cherokee syllabary, one of the few writing systems created by an individual from a pre-literate culture. In Alabama, his people soon started publishing the first newspaper in Cherokee and English, The Cherokee Phoenix.

This settlement was commonly called Willstown after its headman, Will Weber, who had striking red hair. He was the son of Cherokee and German parents and raised as Cherokee.

John Norton, a man born in Scotland about 1770 to Scottish and Cherokee parents, visited this area and other parts of the Cherokee homeland in 1809–1810. He had come to North America as a British soldier and became close to Mohawk people at the Grand River Reserve in Ontario, where he served as an interpreter.

During the 1830s prior to Indian removal, the US Army under command of Major John Payne built a fort near Willstown to intern Cherokee from Alabama until they were forcibly removed to Indian Territory (now Oklahoma). Their forced exile became known as the Trail of Tears. Only a chimney of Fort Payne still stands in the downtown of the city that developed around it.

=== 19th–20th century growth ===
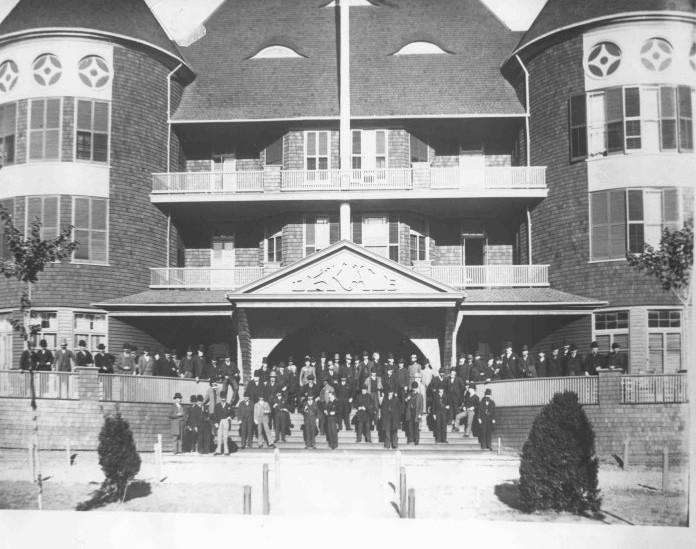
The DeKalb Hotel, built in the Boom in 1889, burned 1918

Although European Americans had pressed for Indian removal in the Southeast because they wanted land to cultivate, by the 1860s, the city of Fort Payne and the surrounding area were only sparsely settled. Development of cotton plantations and larger settlements had taken place in the uplands region known as the Black Belt. With no strategic targets nearby, during the Civil War only minor skirmishes between Union and Confederate forces took place here. About the time of the Second Battle of Chattanooga, a large Union force briefly entered the county, but it did not engage substantial Confederate forces.

In 1878 the city Fort Payne was designated as the county seat, and in 1889 it was incorporated as a town. The community of Lebanon had served as the DeKalb county seat since 1850. With the completion of rail lines between Birmingham and Chattanooga that went through Fort Payne, the city's growth was stimulated by connection to this new transportation route. County sentiment had supported having the seat in a community served by the railroad, seen as key to the future.

In the late 1880s, Fort Payne's growth was stimulated after the discovery of coal and iron deposits, needed to support industrialization. Investors and especially workers from New England and the North flooded into the region for new jobs. This period is called the "Boom Days", or simply the "Boom".

Many of the notable historic buildings in Fort Payne date from this period of economic growth and prosperity, including the state's oldest standing theater, the Fort Payne Opera House; the former factory of the Hardware Manufacturing Company (today known as the W. B. Davis Mill Building, now the location of the Fort Payne Depot Museum, and formerly the passenger station for the present-day Norfolk Southern Railway. Following the decline of passenger traffic in the mid-20th century as people took to automobiles, today the depot serves as a museum of local history.

The iron and coal deposits were much smaller than expected. Many of the promoters left the region for Birmingham, Alabama, which became the state's major industrial city. Fort Payne suffered a period of economic decline. In 1907, the W.B. Davis Hosiery Mill began operations, processing area cotton to produce socks and hosiery. Hosiery manufacture has led the economy in Fort Payne. At the beginning of the 21st century, the hosiery industry in Fort Payne employed over 7,000 people in more than 100 mills. It produced more than half of the socks made in the United States and claimed to be the "Sock Capital of the World."

Beginning in the 1990s, the North American Free Trade Agreement and the Central American Free Trade Agreement lowered tariffs on textile products imported into the United States, resulting in large increases in sock imports. By the early 2000s a very large, highly-efficient center for sock production had grown up around Datang, Zhuji in Zhejiang Province, China. Raw materials and hosiery machines were also manufactured at Datang. While in Fort Payne a company might have to wait two months for a replacement part for a hosiery machine to arrive from Italy, a manufacturer in Datang would have to wait half an hour for the part to arrive from a local company.

American multinational retail corporations began to source hosiery products from Datang. The American companies’ strict negotiating positions required the Datang producers to accept as little as 3% profit. As American retail corporations began to source their products from Datang which became the new "Sock Capital of the World." Many businesses in Fort Payne accused foreign manufacturers, particularly those from China, of engaging in dumping of socks below cost to force American companies out of the sock business. By 2005, hosiery mill employment in Fort Payne had declined to around 5,500, and several mills had closed. In late 2005, the federal government gained an agreement with the Chinese government to slow the schedule for the removal of tariffs, delaying their full removal until 2008. The hosiery industry continues to have a foothold in the community, diversifying from athletic socks to boutique designs such as Zkano, and other specialty and medical socks.

In the 1990s, facing the international threat to their manufacturing, business and civic leaders in Fort Payne began to take steps to diversify the city's economy. Several new commercial and industrial projects were developed. The largest was the 2006 construction of a distribution center for The Children's Place stores, a facility that employed 600 people in its first phase of operation.

Other large corporations represented in Fort Payne include Heil Environmental Industries (a division of Dover Industries, manufacturing sanitation trucks); Vulcraft (a division of Nucor Corporation, manufacturing steel roofing systems); and Game Time (a division of Playcore, manufacturing commercial playground equipment).

== Geography ==
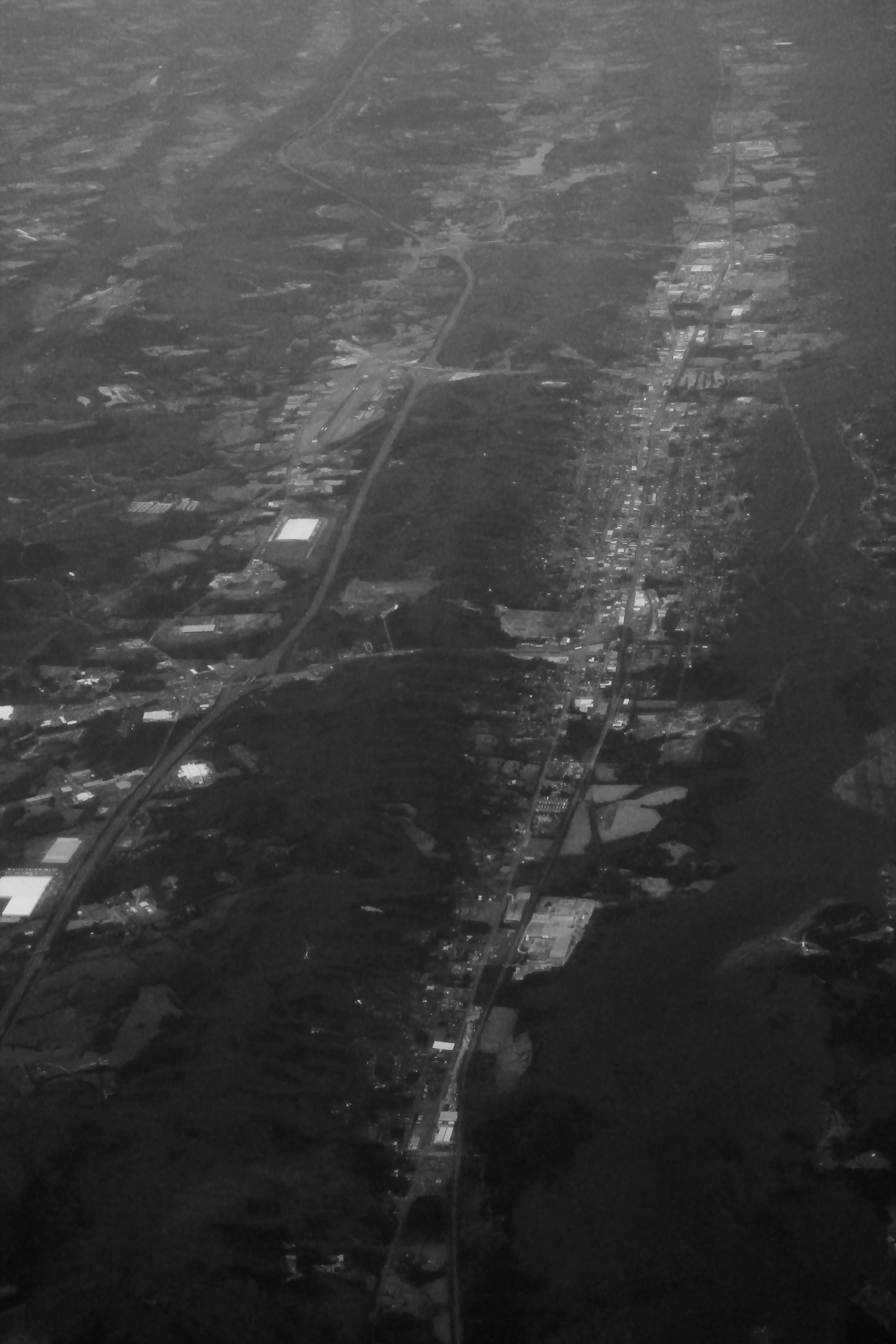
Aerial view of Fort Payne

According to the U.S. Census Bureau, the city has a total area of 55.8 square miles (144.6 km^{2}), of which 55.5 square miles (143.7 km^{2}) is land and 0.35 square miles (0.9 km^{2}), or 0.64%, is water.

The city center lies in a narrow valley on Big Wills Creek in the Cumberland Plateau region immediately west of Lookout Mountain, with Sand Mountain at a distance to the west. The city limits reach to the east and south so that more than half of the city's area is now located on Lookout Mountain. Drainage is through Big Wills Creek to the Coosa River.

A magnitude 4.9 earthquake occurred here in 2003.

=== Climate ===
Fort Payne is notable for a subtropical climate. Winters usually feature measurable, though infrequent, snow. Cloudmont Ski Resort on Lookout Mountain generates man-made snow as winter temperatures permit. The area is subject to occasional tornadoes. The city's northern side was struck by F3 and F4 tornadoes February 29, 1952 and May 19, 1973, respectively, both of which caused considerable damage. Exactly ten years later, a tornado struck the city again. In the Palm Sunday tornado outbreak of 1994, an F3 tornado passed just west of the city

Occasionally, a hurricane that has made landfall in the Gulf of Mexico will reach Fort Payne as a tropical storm or tropical depression. However, in 1995 the eye of Hurricane Opal reached Fort Payne with hurricane-force winds. The 1993 Storm of the Century dumped more than 20 inches (51 cm) of snow on Fort Payne, immobilizing the city and the surrounding area for days. The Köppen Climate Classification subtype for this climate is "Cfa". (Humid Subtropical Climate).

Climate data for Fort Payne, Alabama, 1991–2020 normals, extremes 2001–present
Month	Jan	Feb	Mar	Apr	May	Jun	Jul	Aug	Sep	Oct	Nov	Dec	Year
Record high °F (°C)	76 (24)	81 (27)	87 (31)	89 (32)	94 (34)	102 (39)	104 (40)	103 (39)	100 (38)	102 (39)	89 (32)	77 (25)	104 (40)
Mean maximum °F (°C)	70.0 (21.1)	73.1 (22.8)	80.6 (27.0)	85.1 (29.5)	90.5 (32.5)	95.8 (35.4)	97.3 (36.3)	97.3 (36.3)	93.9 (34.4)	88.1 (31.2)	77.8 (25.4)	71.9 (22.2)	98.9 (37.2)
Mean daily maximum °F (°C)	52.2 (11.2)	56.7 (13.7)	65.1 (18.4)	73.5 (23.1)	81.0 (27.2)	87.7 (30.9)	90.8 (32.7)	90.2 (32.3)	85.8 (29.9)	76.1 (24.5)	64.1 (17.8)	55.4 (13.0)	73.2 (22.9)
Daily mean °F (°C)	41.8 (5.4)	46.2 (7.9)	53.7 (12.1)	61.5 (16.4)	69.7 (20.9)	77.1 (25.1)	80.4 (26.9)	79.7 (26.5)	74.7 (23.7)	63.9 (17.7)	52.6 (11.4)	45.1 (7.3)	62.2 (16.8)
Mean daily minimum °F (°C)	31.5 (−0.3)	35.6 (2.0)	42.4 (5.8)	49.5 (9.7)	58.4 (14.7)	66.6 (19.2)	70.0 (21.1)	69.2 (20.7)	63.7 (17.6)	51.8 (11.0)	41.2 (5.1)	34.9 (1.6)	51.2 (10.7)
Mean minimum °F (°C)	13.1 (−10.5)	19.5 (−6.9)	24.8 (−4.0)	33.8 (1.0)	42.5 (5.8)	57.1 (13.9)	62.2 (16.8)	61.6 (16.4)	52.2 (11.2)	34.7 (1.5)	23.8 (−4.6)	19.9 (−6.7)	11.7 (−11.3)
Record low °F (°C)	1 (−17)	8 (−13)	18 (−8)	27 (−3)	38 (3)	52 (11)	55 (13)	51 (11)	40 (4)	28 (−2)	15 (−9)	6 (−14)	1 (−17)
Average precipitation inches (mm)	5.27 (134)	5.39 (137)	5.28 (134)	5.07 (129)	5.01 (127)	4.60 (117)	5.38 (137)	3.86 (98)	4.42 (112)	3.60 (91)	4.53 (115)	5.62 (143)	58.03 (1,474)
Average precipitation days (≥ 0.01 in)	8.3	9.2	8.6	8.8	9.1	9.1	10.4	7.8	6.2	6.5	8.0	9.0	101.0
Source 1: NOAA (precip days 1981–2010)
Source 2: National Weather Service (mean maxima/minima 2006–2020)

== Demographics ==
Historical population
Census	Pop.	Note	%±
1890	2,698		—
1900	1,037		−61.6%
1910	1,317		27.0%
1920	2,025		53.8%
1930	3,375		66.7%
1940	4,424		31.1%
1950	6,226		40.7%
1960	7,029		12.9%
1970	8,435		20.0%
1980	11,485		36.2%
1990	11,838		3.1%
2000	12,938		9.3%
2010	14,012		8.3%
2020	14,877		6.2%
U.S. Decennial Census

=== Racial and ethnic composition ===
Fort Payne city, Alabama – Racial and ethnic composition Note: the US Census treats Hispanic/Latino as an ethnic category. This table excludes Latinos from the racial categories and assigns them to a separate category. Hispanics/Latinos may be of any race.
Race / Ethnicity (NH = Non-Hispanic)	Pop 1980	Pop 1990	Pop 2000	Pop 2010	Pop 2020	% 1980	% 1990	% 2000	% 2010	% 2020
White alone (NH)	10,826	11,054	10,455	10,091	9,852	94.26%	93.38%	80.81%	72.02%	66.22%
Black or African American alone (NH)	526	569	570	569	498	4.58%	4.81%	4.41%	4.06%	3.35%
Native American or Alaska Native alone (NH)	0	113	77	71	91	0.00%	0.95%	0.60%	0.51%	0.61%
Asian alone (NH)	0	46	71	95	115	0.00%	0.39%	0.55%	0.68%	0.77%
Native Hawaiian or Pacific Islander alone (NH)	x	x	5	8	5	x	x	0.04%	0.06%	0.03%
Other race alone (NH)	6	2	4	11	30	0.05%	0.02%	0.03%	0.08%	0.20%
Mixed race or Multiracial (NH)	x	x	182	237	621	x	x	1.41%	1.69%	4.17%
Hispanic or Latino (any race)	127	54	1,574	2,930	3,665	1.11%	0.46%	12.17%	20.91%	24.64%
Total	11,485	11,838	12,938	14,012	14,877	100.00%	100.00%	100.00%	100.00%	100.00%

=== 2020 census ===
As of the 2020 census, Fort Payne had a population of 14,877 and 5,472 households; 3,219 families resided in the city.

The median age was 36.6 years. 26.6% of residents were under the age of 18 and 16.3% of residents were 65 years of age or older.

For every 100 females there were 94.5 males, and for every 100 females age 18 and over there were 91.2 males age 18 and over.

56.3% of residents lived in urban areas, while 43.7% lived in rural areas.

There were 5,472 households in Fort Payne, of which 35.6% had children under the age of 18 living in them. Of all households, 46.9% were married-couple households, 17.5% were households with a male householder and no spouse or partner present, and 30.5% were households with a female householder and no spouse or partner present. About 29.0% of all households were made up of individuals and 14.2% had someone living alone who was 65 years of age or older.

There were 6,028 housing units, of which 9.2% were vacant. The homeowner vacancy rate was 1.1% and the rental vacancy rate was 8.5%.

=== 2010 census ===
Fort Payne had at the 2010 census a population of 14,012. There were 5,296 households. The racial makeup of the population was 72.0% non-Hispanic white, 4.2% black or African American, 0.9% Native American, 0.8% Asian, 0.2% Pacific Islander, 0.1% non-Hispanic from some other race, 2.5% reporting two or more races and 20.9% Hispanic or Latino of any race.

=== 2000 census ===
As of the census of 2000, there were 12,938 people, 5,046 households, and 3,506 families residing in the city. The population density was 231.5 inhabitants per square mile (89.4/km^{2}). There were 5,585 housing units at an average density of 100.0 per square mile (38.6/km^{2}) The racial makeup of the city was 83.22% White, 4.53% Black or African American, 0.80% Native American, 0.55% Asian, 0.16% Pacific Islander, 8.41% from other races, and 2.33% from two or more races. 12.17% of the population were Hispanic or Latino of any race.

There were 5,046 households, out of which 31.2% had children under the age of 18 living with them, 53.9% were married couples living together, 11.6% had a female householder with no husband present, and 30.5% were non-families. 26.9% of all households were made up of individuals, and 12.1% had someone living alone who was 65 years of age or older. The average household size was 2.49 and the average family size was 2.97.

In the city, the population was spread out, with 23.4% under the age of 18, 10.2% from 18 to 24, 29.3% from 25 to 44, 21.6% from 45 to 64, and 15.6% who were 65 years of age or older. The median age was 36 years. For every 100 females, there were 92.3 males. For every 100 females age 18 and over, there were 88.5 males.

The median income for a household in the city was $33,560, and the median income for a family was $40,200. Males had a median income of $29,731 versus $20,135 for females. The per capita income for the city was $19,690. About 8.3% of families and 12.3% of the population were below the poverty line, including 15.0% of those under age 18 and 17.6% of those age 65 or over.

== Arts and culture ==
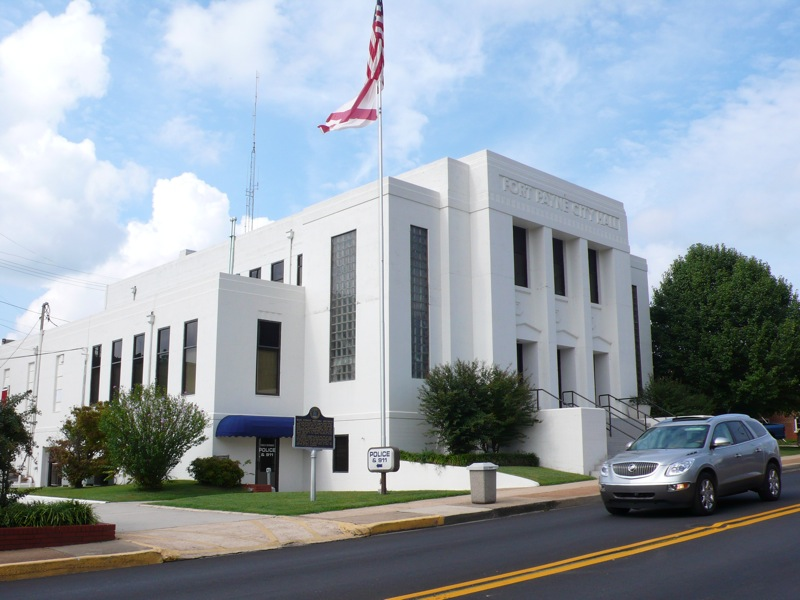
Former city hall, now police headquarters

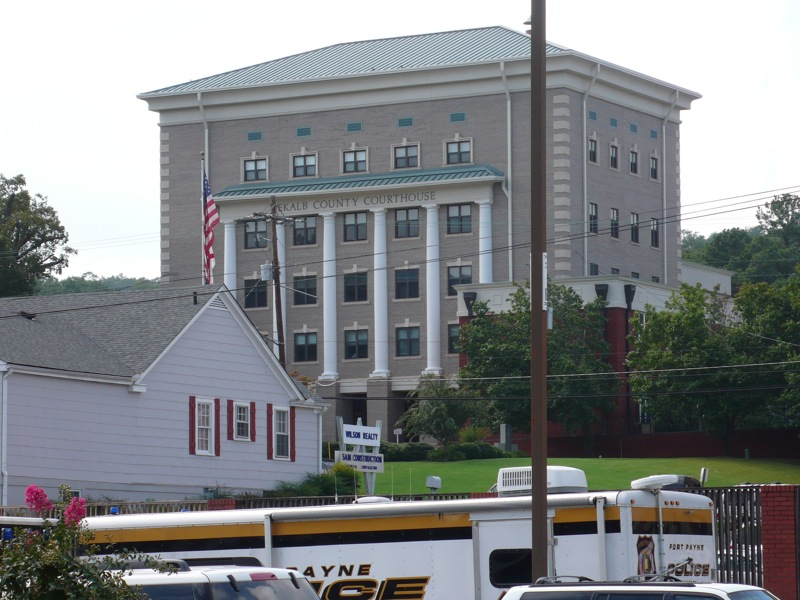
DeKalb County Courthouse

The ruins of the old Fort Payne are visible in the historic downtown of the city.

The National Park Service has headquarters here for the nearby Little River Canyon National Preserve, a 14,000-acre (57 km^{2}) protected area established by Congress in 1992. The canyon is on Lookout Mountain outside the city limits.

Another natural attraction is DeSoto State Park. While smaller in area, it has a lodge, restaurant, cabins, and river access areas. Manitou Cave is also near Fort Payne.

The country music group Alabama is based in Fort Payne. The city also houses the group's fan club and museum.

Fort Payne is within a 30-minute drive of substantial water recreational areas, notably Guntersville Lake and Weiss Lake, an artificial lake on the Coosa River. Fort Payne is also near Mentone, a popular mountain resort area known for summer children's camps, rustic hotels, restaurants, and cabins.

== Education ==
Fort Payne is served by the Fort Payne City Schools system. Schools in the district include Wills Valley Elementary (K-2), Little Ridge Intermediate (3–5) Fort Payne Middle School (6–8), and Fort Payne High School (9–12).

Brian Jett is the Superintendent of Education.

== Media ==
- Radio stations
  - WFPA-AM 1400 (News/Talk)
  - WZOB-AM 1250 (Country)
- Newspapers
  - The Times-Journal
  - The Dekalb Advertiser
  - Southern Torch

== Infrastructure ==
=== Health care ===
- DeKalb Regional Medical Center- 134-bed facility

=== Transportation ===
- Interstate 59
- U.S. Highway 11
- Alabama State Route 35
- Norfolk Southern Railway
- Isbell Field (municipal airport)

== Notable people ==
- Miles C. Allgood (1878–1977), U.S. congressman
- Mark E. Biddle, Old Testament scholar
- Harry B. Brock, Jr., banker and philanthropist
- Weston Burt, country music singer
- David Brown (translator), Cherokee interpreter and missionary
- Jeff Cook, Teddy Gentry, and Randy Owen, founders of the country music band Alabama
- Thomas H. Cook, mystery writer
- Lt. Gen. Duward Crow (1919–1997), Assistant Vice Chief of Staff, USAF and Associate Deputy Administrator, NASA
- James Dean, author, artist (Pete the Cat)
- Jerry Ellis, author
- Howard Finster, religious folk artist and Baptist minister
- Flock Family (NASCAR drivers)
  - Bob Flock (1918–1964)
  - Fonty Flock (1921–1972)
  - Tim Flock (1924–1998)
  - Ethel Mobley (1920–1984)
- Milford W. Howard, congressman and author
- Sheila LaBarre, convicted murderer
- Lt. Gen. Forrest S. McCartney, USAF, and director of the John F. Kennedy Space Center
- James McKinney, 5-string banjo player
- Evan McPherson, NFL player
- Larry Nelson, professional golfer
- Philip Ober, actor
- Lilius Bratton Rainey, congressman
- Ron Sparks, Alabama Commissioner of Agriculture and Industries, 2010 Democratic gubernatorial nominee
- Edward Stinson, aviator and founder of the Stinson Aircraft Company
- Katherine Stinson, pioneer aviator, fourth woman in the U.S. to become a licensed pilot; sister of Edward Stinson

== Local facts ==
For a time beginning in 1989, Fort Payne held the world record for "Largest Cake Ever Baked", for a cake of 128,238 pounds (58,168 kg) baked to commemorate the city's centennial.
