= Mentone, Alabama =

- Town
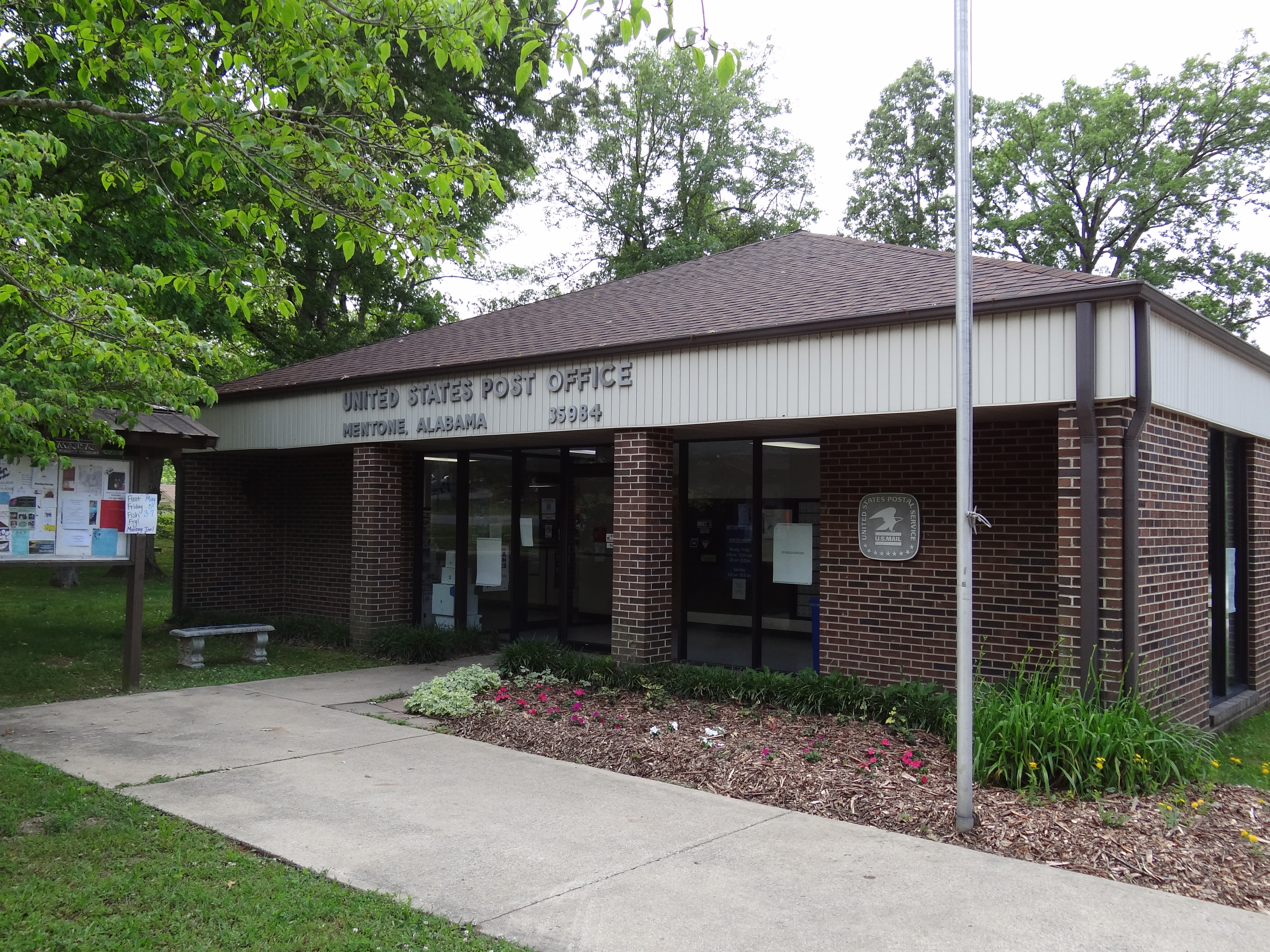
- Post office in Mentone

- Location of Mentone in DeKalb County, Alabama.
- Coordinates: 34°34′20″N 85°34′49″W
- Country: United States
- State: Alabama
- County: DeKalb

Government
  - Type: Mayor-Council
  - Mayor: Rob Hammond

Area
  - Total: 4.30 sq mi (11.13 km^{2})
  - Land: 4.29 sq mi (11.11 km^{2})
  - Water: 0.012 sq mi (0.03 km^{2})
- Elevation: 1,686 ft (514 m)

Population (2020)
  - Total: 319
  - Density: 74.4/sq mi (28.72/km^{2})
- Time zone: UTC−6 (Central (CST))
  - Summer (DST): UTC−5 (CDT)
- ZIP code: 35984
- Area code: 256
- FIPS code: 01-48064
- GNIS feature ID: 2406147
- Website: mentonealabama.gov

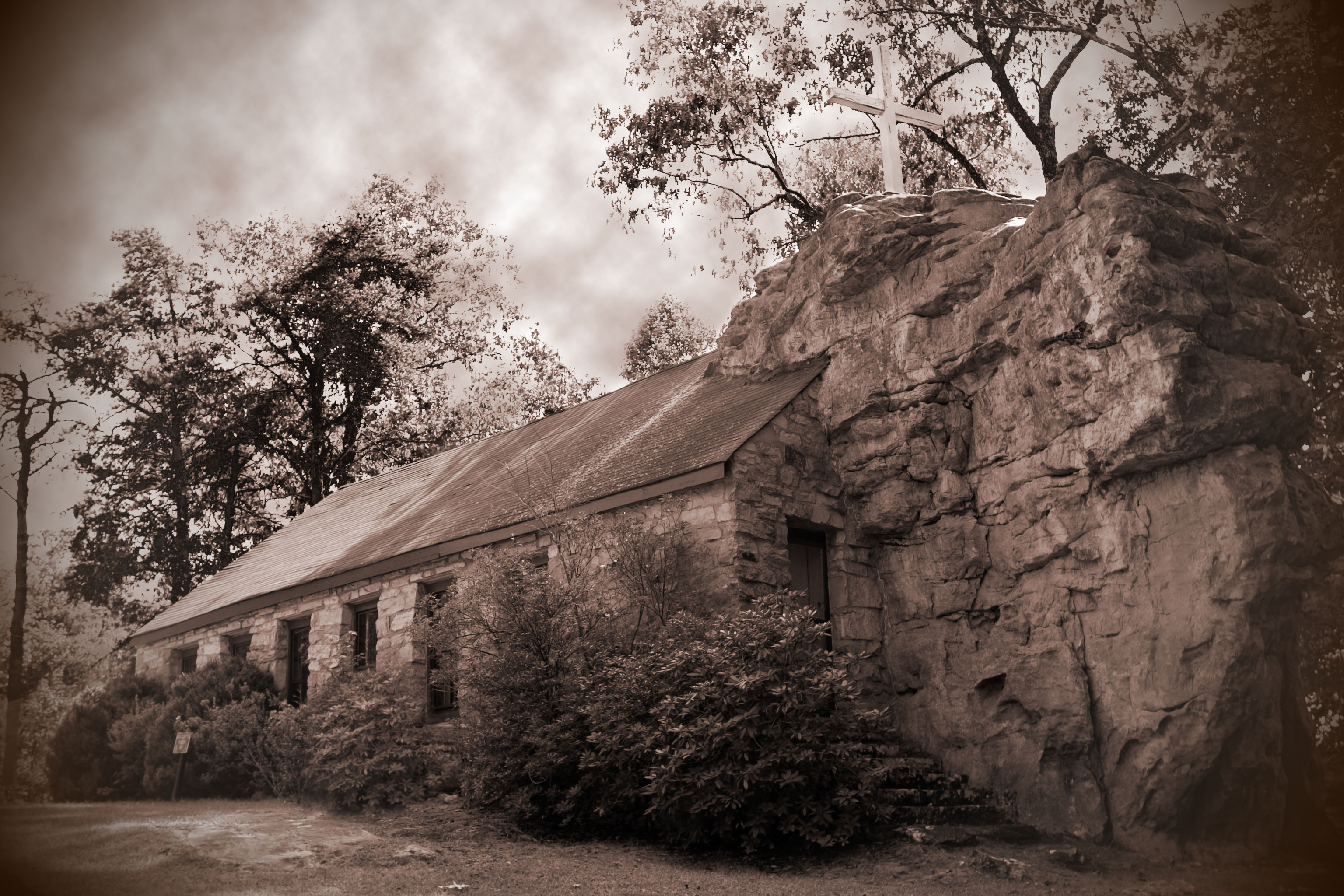
Sallie Howard Memorial Chapel, built into a boulder, is located in Mentone.

Mentone is a town in DeKalb County, Alabama, United States. Its location is atop Lookout Mountain. As of the 2020 census, Mentone had a population of 319.

A number of private summer camps are located near Mentone. For a number of years, Mentone has hosted an unusually large number of summer camps. Mentone attracts many visitors and tourists annually, partly due to the summer camps.

== History ==
The community was named after Menton in France and was incorporated in 1935.

In April 2003, it was the town nearest the epicenter of a magnitude 4.6 earthquake. The surprise quake had alarmed residents in the dark hours of the morning and was felt across several states, but it did not cause any injuries and only minor damage to the town. Mentone is in the Ridge and Valley region of the southwestern Appalachian Mountains, an area that generally goes several decades between significant earthquakes but has never had a major one in recorded history.

== Geography ==
Mentone is located in eastern DeKalb County at 34°34′20″N 85°34′49″W (34.572360, -85.580283). It is bordered to the west by the town of Valley Head. The center of town is located on the crest of Lookout Mountain at an elevation of 1,736 feet (529 m). The western border of the town, with Valley Head, follows the western slopes of the mountain. Extending south from the town center is the mountain's ridgecrest that rises to an elevation of 1,785 feet (544 m) within the town limits. The West Fork of the Little River crosses the eastern portion of the town at an elevation less than 100 feet (30 m) below the ridgecrest.

According to the U.S. Census Bureau, the town has a total area of 4.7 square miles (12.1 km^{2}), of which 0.01 square miles (0.03 km^{2}), or 0.23%, is water.

== Climate ==
Mentone has a humid subtropical climate (Cfa) with hot, humid summers and cool, wet winters.

Climate data for Valley Head, AL, 1981-2010 normals, extremes 1893-present
Month	Jan	Feb	Mar	Apr	May	Jun	Jul	Aug	Sep	Oct	Nov	Dec	Year
Record high °F (°C)	79 (26)	80 (27)	90 (32)	92 (33)	100 (38)	104 (40)	106 (41)	105 (41)	104 (40)	98 (37)	90 (32)	78 (26)	106 (41)
Mean daily maximum °F (°C)	49.3 (9.6)	53.8 (12.1)	62.1 (16.7)	70.7 (21.5)	78.2 (25.7)	85.3 (29.6)	88.5 (31.4)	88.2 (31.2)	82.5 (28.1)	72.7 (22.6)	64.4 (18.0)	51.6 (10.9)	70.6 (21.5)
Mean daily minimum °F (°C)	27.5 (−2.5)	30.2 (−1.0)	36.4 (2.4)	43.5 (6.4)	53.5 (11.9)	62.4 (16.9)	66.6 (19.2)	65.9 (18.8)	58.6 (14.8)	46.2 (7.9)	37.3 (2.9)	30.0 (−1.1)	46.5 (8.1)
Record low °F (°C)	−15 (−26)	−17 (−27)	2 (−17)	19 (−7)	29 (−2)	35 (2)	45 (7)	45 (7)	29 (−2)	19 (−7)	−2 (−19)	−8 (−22)	−17 (−27)
Average precipitation inches (mm)	5.44 (138)	5.53 (140)	5.04 (128)	4.54 (115)	4.65 (118)	4.13 (105)	5.22 (133)	3.52 (89)	4.42 (112)	3.43 (87)	4.99 (127)	4.06 (103)	54.97 (1,395)
Average snowfall inches (cm)	1.8 (4.6)	1.3 (3.3)	1.3 (3.3)	0.4 (1.0)	0 (0)	0 (0)	0 (0)	0 (0)	0 (0)	0 (0)	0.2 (0.51)	0.9 (2.3)	5.9 (15.01)
Average precipitation days (≥ 0.01 in)	12	12	12	11	11	12	12	10	9	8	11	12	132

== Demographics ==
Historical population
Census	Pop.	Note	%±
1940	154		—
1950	241		56.5%
1960	250		3.7%
1970	407		62.8%
1980	476		17.0%
1990	474		−0.4%
2000	451		−4.9%
2010	360		−20.2%
2020	319		−11.4%
U.S. Decennial Census; 2013 Estimate

As of the 2000 census, there were 451 people, 201 households, and 127 families residing in the town. The population density was 95.8 inhabitants per square mile (37.0/km^{2}). There were 350 housing units at an average density of 74.3 per square mile (28.7/km^{2}). The racial makeup of the town was 95.34% White, 1.11% Black or African American, 0.67% Native American, and 2.88% from two or more races. Furthermore, 0.22% of the population were Hispanic or Latino of any race. The 2010 census listed the population at 360, down from 451 in 2000.

There were 201 households, of which 25.9% had children under the age of 18 living with them, 49.3% were married couples living together, 7.5% had a female householder with no husband present, and 36.8% were non-families. Moreover, 33.8% of all households were made up of individuals, and 16.4% had someone living alone who was 65 years of age or older. The average household size was 2.23 persons, and the average family size was 2.87 persons.

Within the town, the population was spread out, with 23.1% under the age of 18, 7.1% from 18 to 24, 21.3% from 25 to 44, 27.9% from 45 to 64, and 20.6% from 65 and older. The median age was 44 years. For every 100 females, there were 90.3 males. For every 100 females aged 18 and over, there were 86.6 males.

The median income for a household in the town was $24,625, and the median income for a family was $28,750. Males had a median income of $27,411 versus $17,656 for females. The per capita income for the town was $13,561. About 13.5% of families and 12.2% of the population were below the poverty line, with 10.0% of those under age 18 and 14.0% of those aged 65 or over.
