= 2019 Beauregard tornado =

2019 Tornado event in Alabama and Georgia, United States

- The tornado, seen on Alabama State Route 51

Meteorological history
- Formed: 2:00 p.m. CST (UTC−06:00), March 3, 2019
- Dissipated: 3:16 p.m. CST (UTC−05:00), March 3, 2019
- Duration: 1 hour, 16 minutes

EF4 tornado
- on the Enhanced Fujita scale
- Highest winds: 170 mph (270 km/h)

Overall effects
- Fatalities: 23
- Injuries: 97
- Damage: >$500,000 (2019 USD) (Damage estimates only covers tornado while in Georgia.)
- Areas affected: Eastern Alabama, especially Lee County; Western Georgia.
- Part of the Tornado outbreak of March 3, 2019 and Tornadoes of 2019

On the afternoon of March 3, 2019, a violent and long-tracked EF4 tornado struck portions of eastern Alabama and western Georgia, causing extreme damage along its path. This tornado was the deadliest tornado in the United States since the 2013 Moore tornado, killing 23 and injuring 97, in addition to being the first EF4 tornado to occur in the United States since a tornado near Canton, Texas, on April 29, 2017. This tornado was part of a larger tornado outbreak that affected the Southeastern United States on this same day. This outbreak produced numerous tornadoes across Alabama and Georgia. This was the deadliest and strongest tornado of this outbreak, and the 8th deadliest in Alabama state history.

The tornado first touched down at 2:00 p.m. CST (3:00 p.m. EST) near Society Hill, Alabama, and stayed on the ground for 76 minutes over a 68.6 miles (110.4 km) path, ravaging numerous homes and businesses, as well as doing significant tree damage. The tornado killed 23 people along the path, all of them in Alabama, and injured nearly 100 along the entire extent of the path. The tornado was 1,600 yards (1,500 m) at its widest point. The tornado continued into Georgia, causing up to EF3 damage in some areas. The tornado lasted 47 minutes in Georgia and traveled 42 miles (68 km) before lifting near Talbotton, Georgia at 3:16 p.m. CST (4:16 p.m. EST).

== Meteorological Synopsis ==
A week before the event took place, the Storm Prediction Center (SPC) noted that there may be a convective event in their day 8 (Note: The Storm Prediction Center (SPC) classifies the current day as "Day 1", and the next day (Tomorrow) as "Day 2", all the way up to 7 days out "Day 8".) outlook, but there was not enough confidence to issue a 15% outlined area. The SPC continued with this wording but no outline until 3 days before the event, when the SPC outlined a large 15% risk area for most of Alabama and Mississippi, as well as some states westward. The confidence in the forecasts continued to grow on a potential for several tornadoes, some being strong over a small corridor of Southern and Eastern Alabama and Central Georgia, where they issued an enhanced risk (level 3 out of 5). They also expanded the slight risk further to the east and south. The SPC maintained an enhanced risk through day 1, and expanding in all directions to include a larger area. However, this event could have verified as a high risk had the SPC chosen to issue one. The 12z surface analysis indicated that a broad area of low pressure was located over the far western Carolinas. An inland stationary front, baroclinic zone and an associated warm front extending southwestward across north-central Georgia to extreme southeast Texas. There, a surface low carrying a powerful cold front with arctic air and wintry weather southward. The entire feature was moving to the northeast. Significant convective available potential energy (CAPE) was noted offshore in the 12z SPC mesoanalysis. By 18z as the front lifted northward, CAPE of 1000-2500 J/kg was noted over inland areas in the mesoanalysis. Combined with strong 0–6 km bulk shear of about 50 knots (58 mph) and Storm Relative Helicity of 300-500 m^{2}/s^{2}, the environment was more than favorable for the development of semi-discrete supercells within a squall line capable of producing several potentially strong tornadoes.

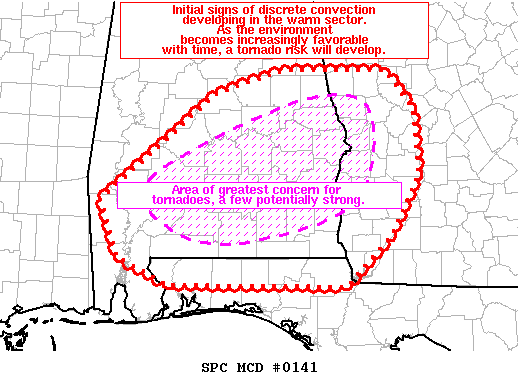
Mesoscale Discussion 141 outlining the potential for a few strong tornadoes in pink.

At 9:59 a.m. CST, the SPC issued a mesoscale convective discussion (MCD) giving a 95% chance of a tornado watch being issued for southern Alabama, southwestern Georgia, and northwestern Florida. The SPC noted the potential for a few potentially strong tornadoes in southern Alabama into west-central Georgia. This included the area where this tornado went over. The SPC cited that several radars had strong, curved hodographs with little weakness in them; indicative for this strong tornado potential. Nearly 2 hours later, the SPC issued a tornado watch for Southern Alabama into Northwest Florida. Less than an hour later, the SPC also issued a tornado watch for a large portion of central Georgia, and a small part of the central Florida Panhandle. Both of these watches cited that "A few tornadoes likely with a couple intense tornadoes possible", and had an 70% chance of 2 or more tornadoes, and a 50% chance of 1 or more significant (EF2 or higher) tornadoes. A squall line of storms continued to develop along the cold front, with semi-discrete supercells embedded within the line. A few discrete supercells were also noted on radar imagery in southern Georgia, and another developing supercell over Alabama that would later produce this tornado. Significant tornado parameters (Note: Significant tornado parameter is an equation that takes into account CAPE, shear, helicity, and moisture. It gives out a number. The higher the number the higher chance that there will be a significant tornado.) increased along the line where the embedded discrete supercell was located was consistently at a 3 to a 4. In addition, a local increase of storm relative helicity to 600 also aided in the development in the strong tornado. All of these parameters in place increased the tornado potential in this area, as noted by an MCD that was issued for a small area exactly 1 hour before the tornado touched down. The SPC noted that the shear and CAPE were maximized, and that strong tornadogenesis will likely occur "within the next 30-60 minutes".

== Tornado summary ==
=== Alabama ===
A tornado warning was first issued for Lee and Russell Counties at 1:58 pm CST, about two minutes before the tornado first touched down. The National Weather Service in Birmingham, Alabama noted that "a severe thunderstorm capable of producing a tornado was located near Tuskegee National Forest". At 2:00 pm CST, the tornado touched down just southwest of Rogers Road and just northeast of US 80 in northeast Macon County. The tornado produced EF0 to EF1 damage to trees. The tornado moved over the Macon/Lee County line at 2:03 PM CST as an EF1 tornado, and uprooted trees. A minute later along County Road 29 in Alabama, the tornado remained at EF1 strength. A small church had its doors blown in, the roof removed, and a quarter of the cinder block walls were collapsed. Several trees were here uprooted as well. The tornado intensified as it moved east towards County Road 11, snapping and debarking tree trunks. There was also a barn that had significant loss of roofing material and a home that lost some shingles along C.R. 11. It is noted that weak ground rowing was beginning to be observed at this location. Debris began to spread to the east of C.R. 11, and this is the same time that a debris signature became evident on radar. At this time, the National Weather Service upgraded the tornado warning to a Particularly Dangerous Situation (PDS) tornado warning with a radar confirmed tornado. The warning stated that there was "a confirmed large and extremely dangerous tornado" was on the ground.

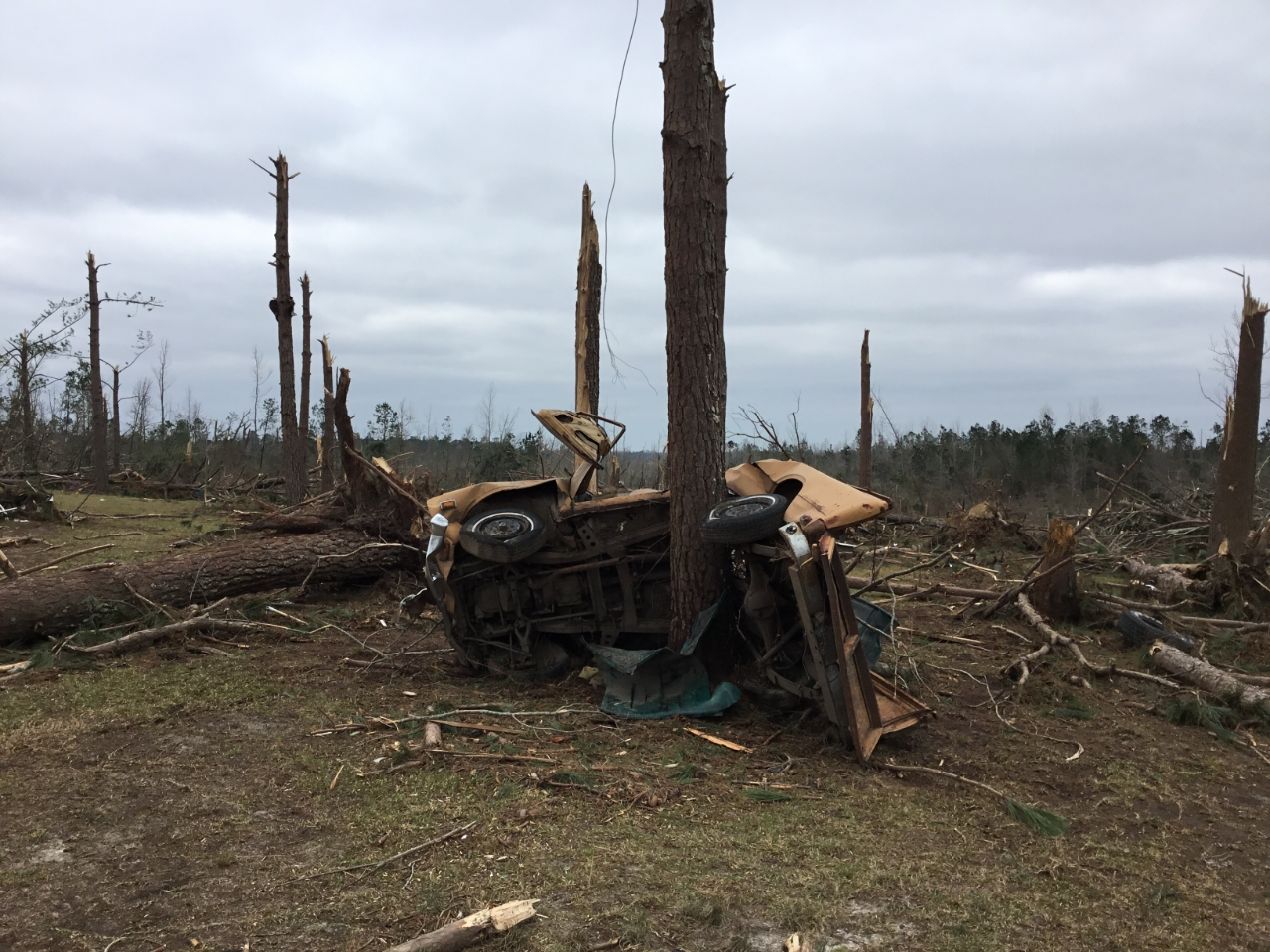
Car wrapped around a tree in Beauregard, Alabama

One minute later at 2:07 PM CST, the tornado reached its peak intensity immediately south of the intersection of Lee County Road 36 and Lee County Road 39. Numerous large trees snapped at their bases, as well as large trees with very expansive root systems being uprooted and fallen. This area of trees was given a low-end EF4 rating, with estimated winds at 167 miles per hour (269 km/h). In this area, high-end EF3 damage was observed to numerous homes in the area. A manufactured home was rolled, and its contents were emptied nearby on the track's northern side. In addition, five homes within close proximity where all walls were collapsed, with debris tossed a short distance away from the foundation of the homes. A car was mangled beyond recognition, and the frame was wrapped around the stub of a snapped and debarked tree. The tornado passed over a small lake. Across the small lake, two houses were leveled. The debris was removed from the foundation. The anchor bolt screws remained intact on these homes. These two homes received a low-end EF4 rating with 170 miles per hour (270 km/h) winds estimated. Two other houses near the northern path of the tornado were also surveyed. There was considerable damage to these homes, and they received EF3 ratings. The storm crossed County Road 39 slightly weaker but still producing significant damage to numerous homes and trees in the area. The tornado paralleled C.R. 39, where two manufactured homes were demolished, and their debris scattered. The metal frames of these homes could not be located. There was also severe timber damage to the north of the road. Here, only a badly mangled metal frame to a mobile home remained. A mattress was wrapped around the stub of a tree. Nearby a tractor trailer rig was on its side and shoved around a sturdy tree while a nearby site-built home lost nearly all of its exterior walls with debris remaining on or near the home site. There was also evidence of ground scouring here.

The tornado then crossed SR 51 at high-end EF3 strength. Here, a double-wide manufactured home was moved off of its base and the exterior walls collapsed on a family residence. There was also severe tree damage with large trees being snapped at the bases. The tornado crossed nearby County Road 38, entering a heavily wooded area, causing significant tree damage. There was also some damage to surrounding homes. At this time, the National Weather Service upgraded the active PDS tornado warning to a rare tornado emergency, stating that a "large and destructive tornado was located near Griffen Mill, or 11 miles southeast of Auburn, moving east at 60 mph." A minute later, the tornado exited the wooded area after snapping several trees. It crossed County Road 100, causing significant tree damage and ripping the roof off of a house and shifting another house off of its foundation. It then crossed County Road 166, demolishing several manufactured homes in that area and continuing to produce significant tree damage.

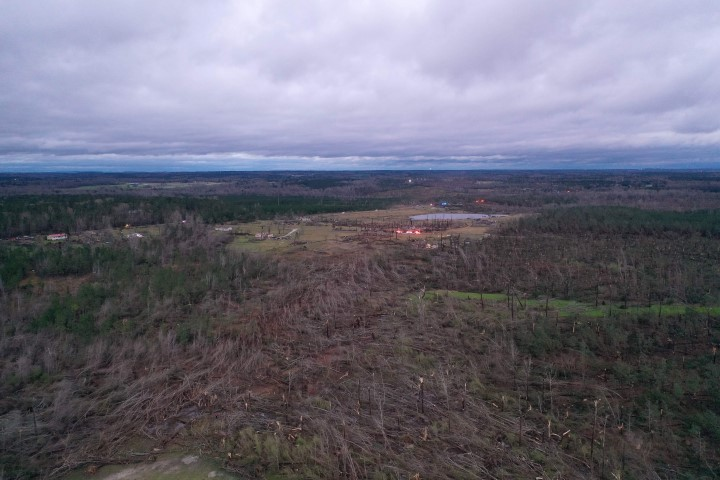
Path of significant tree damage in Lee County, Alabama.

As the tornado progressed over a wooded area and reached County Road 165, a family residence suffered severe damage as the exterior walls were collapsed, and another home suffered severe roof damage. A mobile home was also flipped, and its debris scattered about. As the tornado continued moving northeastward, tree damage Continued to occur. It reached County Road 175, where a home suffered significant loss of roofing, and trees were snapped at the trunks. The tornado weakened as it crossed County Road 240, where damage to homes and trees continued. It moved over a rural area crossing County Roads 245 and 179, causing tree damage and minor roof damage. The tornado then passed through northern areas of Smiths Station. Less significant damage occurred than previously happened. A mobile home was flipped, and several constructed homes suffered roofing and siding damages. Tree damage also continued to occur. The tornado moved over rural areas, continuing its timber and tree damage. The tornado approached the Chattahoochee River, where it caused roof damage to a few homes in that area. Significant tree damage was also observed here. The tornado crossed the river and continued in Georgia.

=== Georgia ===
The tornado crossed the Alabama/Georgia border at the Chattahoochee River 29 minutes after tornadogenesis occurred. At 3:29 PM EST after crossing the river, the tornado continued moving quickly to the east-northeast, causing a wide swath of trees being uprooted or snapped near the base of the ground. The tornado was consistently an EF1 during this time. The tornado rapidly strengthened during the next 10 minutes. At 3:39 PM EST the tornado crossed US 27 and caused a swath of EF3 damage to pine trees, and toppled a cellular tower. In addition, 12 metal guidewires over 1 inch (2.5 cm) thick were snapped.

The tornado weakened immediately after this back down to an EF1 intensity. A wide swath of hundreds of snapped and uprooted trees persisted along this portion of the track to the south and west of Ellerslie, Georgia. Minor roof damage was reported on several homes along the path in this rural area of Georgia. The tornado reached the southern side of Ellerslie at 3:47 PM EST. The tornado continued to parallel SR 315 where hundreds more trees were snapped or uprooted. Some shingles were pulled off of several homes, with one home sustaining damage to the top floor. The tornado continued to push Northeastward, were numerous trees were downed. Another home sustained severe damage to the top floor, with several homes nearby sustaining minor shingles, and a carport being destroyed.

The tornado crossed Ridgeway Road, located just to the north of SR 315. EF2 damage continued to be reported in this location, with dozens of softwood trees being snapped at their bases. The tornado eventually ran into SR 315 as the highway winds perpendicular to the tornado's path at this point. The tornado continued causing EF1 to EF2 damage to trees along a wide swath. At 3:54 PM EST, the tornado crossed into Talbot County, Georgia. The tornado continued its long swath of EF1 to EF2 damage. The tornado intensified again into an EF3 tornado, causing significant damage to a mobile trailer home, dozens of trees, and a two-story home. In addition, the Humble Zion Church was completely demolished. None of its brick and cinderblock walls were left standing. The tornado continued northeastward, weakening significantly. EF1 wind damage was found consistently through forested areas in and around SR 315, along Callier Rd, O'Neal Rd, and Mitchell Rd. The tornado then approached Talbotton, Georgia, continuing to cause moderate tree damage and minor roof damage to homes that were in the path.

At 4:03 PM EST, the tornado moved into the northern side of Talbotton. Trees were observed to be snapped going into town along Adams Road. The tornado intensified again as it headed into town. It intersected Washington Avenue, which is the main north–south road in the town. It caused high-end EF2 damage in this area with several manufactured homes turned over and destroyed, sometimes mangled. It was unrecognizable where these manufactured homes originally sat. The contents from inside of these homes were blown over a quarter mile from where the homes were originally located. A single-family home was removed and twisted at least 10 feet (3.0 m) off its foundation. The second story of this home was completely removed. The tornado then intensified further into an EF3 tornado, where two brick-and-mortar apartments were completely demolished. The slabs of these apartments were left completely bare after the tornado. Dozens of cars were also destroyed. Debris were blasted into the vehicles, and the windows were blown out. In addition, a sedan was overturned on to the side. Several homes lost roofs as well. The tornado continued moving northeast out of the town. Seven injuries were reported within the town. The tornado continued, with trees snapped and uprooted as it moved out of town and into wooded areas. Another manufactured home was overturned. The tornado moved into a small valley, snapping hundreds of trees. A few final trees were snapped at the end of the tornadoes life. At 4:16 PM EST and about 10.5 miles east-northeast of Talbotton, Georgia, the tornado dissipated.

== See also ==
- Tornadoes of 2019
