= Tornado outbreak of March 3, 2019 =

Severe weather effect in the Southeastern United States

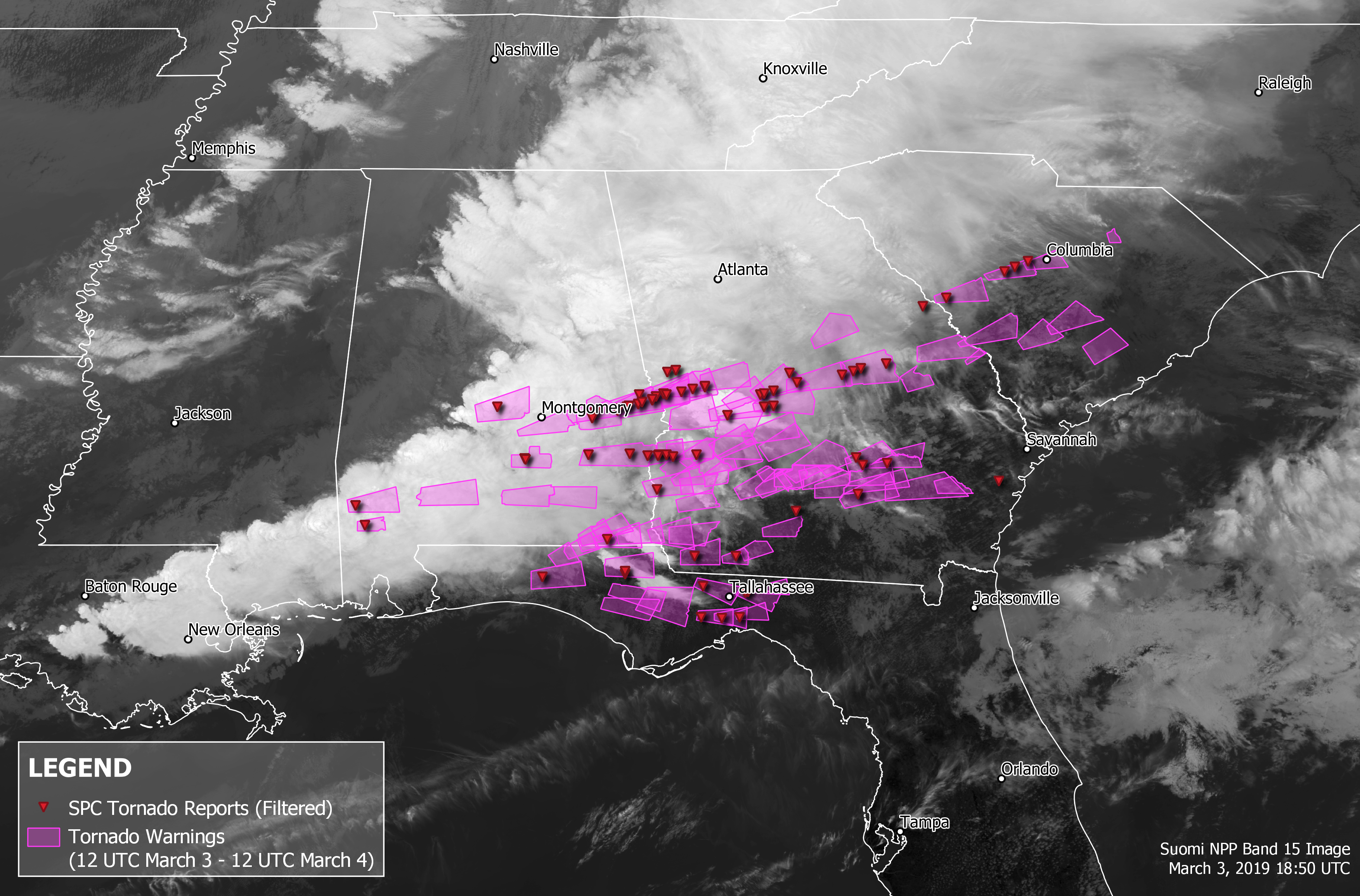
- Tornado warnings and Storm Prediction Center tornado reports on March 3 superimposed on a Suomi NPP infrared satellite picture taken at 18:50 UTC

Meteorological history
- Formed: March 3, 2019
- Dissipated: March 3, 2019

Tornado outbreak
- Tornadoes: 41
- Max. rating: EF4 tornado
- Duration: 6 hours, 30 minutes
- Highest winds: Tornadic – 170 mph (270 km/h) in Lee County, Alabama EF4; Straight-line – 78 mph (126 km/h) at Fisherman Island, Virginia

Category 1 "Notable" winter storm
- Regional snowfall index: 1.37 (NOAA)
- Largest hail: 2 in (5.1 cm) diameter near Elberta, Georgia
- Max. snowfall: 27.5 in (70 cm) in Mount Audubon, Colorado on March 2–3

Overall effects
- Fatalities: 23 deaths, 103 injuries
- Damage: $190 million (2019 USD)
- Areas affected: Southeastern United States, particularly Alabama and Georgia and the Florida Panhandle
- Part of the tornado outbreaks of 2019

A significant and deadly severe weather event that affected the Southeastern United States on March 3, 2019. Over the course of 6 hours, a total of 42 tornadoes touched down across portions of Alabama, Georgia, Florida, and South Carolina. The strongest of these was an EF4 tornado that devastated rural communities from Beauregard, Alabama, through Smiths Station, Alabama to Talbotton, Georgia, killing 23 people and injuring at least 100 others. Its death toll represented more than twice the number of tornado deaths in the United States in 2018 as well as the deadliest single tornado in the country since the 2013 Moore EF5 tornado. An EF3 tornado also destroyed residences to the east of Tallahassee in Leon County, Florida, and was only the second tornado of that strength in the county since 1945. Several other strong tornadoes occurred across the region throughout the evening of March 3 and caused significant damage. A large number of EF0 and EF1 tornadoes also touched down.

== Meteorological synopsis ==
On February 28, the Storm Prediction Center (SPC) issued a day four risk for severe thunderstorms across a broad region of the Southeast United States stretching from northern Louisiana through northwestern Georgia. A broad slight risk was introduced the following day, and a more narrow enhanced risk was raised across portions of southeastern Alabama and southwestern Georgia later on March 2 where the threat for tornadoes, some potentially strong, appeared most likely.

GOES-16 satellite animation showing the Lee County, Alabama tornado

The severe weather prediction for March 3 came to fruition that morning as a broad mid-level cyclone in the northern jet stream pushed eastward over northern Ontario and James Bay. A series of shortwave troughs rotated around the southern semicircle of this low-pressure system, with an especially well-defined shortwave progressing from the South Central United States eastward across the Appalachian Mountains and into the Atlantic Ocean. This feature led to the formation of a surface low over northern Mississippi and Alabama, aiding in the northern transport of rich and deep moisture originating from the Gulf of Mexico. Strong southwesterly low-level winds coupled with strong forcing for ascent along a trailing cold front led to the formation of a squall line stretching from the Carolinas down into portions of the Deep South. Ahead of this line, the combination of mid-level Convective Available Potential Energy of 500–1,200 J/kg, a low-level jet of 50–70 kn, and effective storm-relative helicity of 250–400 J/kg resulted in a highly unstable atmosphere that was conducive to the formation of strong tornadoes. The lack of strong convective inhibition, coupled with weak forcing, favored the formation of numerous discrete supercell thunderstorms across the Florida Panhandle, southeastern Alabama, much of central Georgia, and into South Carolina. Throughout the afternoon, numerous supercell thunderstorms that formed ahead of the squall line produced several significant and damaging tornadoes, including the long-tracked violent EF4 tornado that struck Beauregard and Smith's Station, Alabama (roughly 15 miles apart) as well as Talbotton, Georgia (about 60–65 miles (97–105 km) from Smith's Station, AL and across a wider section of the Chattahoochee River). As the squall line moved eastward, embedded circulations and semi-discrete structures within the line produced additional strong tornadoes before tornadic activity waned with eastward progression overnight.

== Confirmed tornadoes ==
Confirmed tornadoes by Enhanced Fujita rating
| EFU | EF0 | EF1 | EF2 | EF3 | EF4 | EF5 | Total |
|---|---|---|---|---|---|---|---|
| 0 | 12 | 20 | 7 | 1 | 1 | 0 | 41 |

=== March 3 event ===
List of confirmed tornadoes – Sunday, March 3, 2019 (Note: All dates are based on the local time zone where the tornado touched down; however, all times are in Coordinated Universal Time for consistency.)
| EF# | Location | County / Parish | State | Start Coord. | Time (UTC) | Path length | Max width |
|---|---|---|---|---|---|---|---|
| EF1 | S of Chatom | Washington | AL | 31.4188°N 88.2566°W | 18:55–18:56 | 3.18 mi (5.12 km) | 300 yd (270 m) |
| EF1 | Trees were damaged and some were snapped in the vicinity of SR 17. In November 2023, this tornado was reanalyzed and had its track extended significantly based on a narrow swath of tree damage noted on high-resolution Planet satellite imagery. The tornado occurred primarily in densely forested areas largely inaccessible to the survey team. Path length increased from 0.17 mi (0.27 km) to 3.18 mi (5.12 km). | | | | | | |
| EF0 | ENE of Mulberry | Autauga | AL | 32.4710°N 86.7470°W | 19:19 | 0.62 mi (1.00 km) | 70 yd (64 m) |
| EF0 | Tree limbs were broken and some trees were uprooted. | | | | | | |
| EF1 | SW of McIntosh | Washington | AL | 31.2118°N 88.1575°W | 19:37–19:42 | 2.6 mi (4.2 km) | 100 yd (91 m) |
| EF1 | An addition to a church was heavily damaged. Trees were downed, and a few other structures in the area sustained minor damage. | | | | | | |
| EF4 | W of Beauregard, AL to ENE of Talbotton, GA | Macon (AL), Lee (AL), Muscogee (GA), Harris (GA), Talbot (GA) | AL, GA | 32.4472°N 85.4818°W | 20:00–21:16 | 68.73 mi (110.61 km) | 1,600 yd (1,500 m) |
| EF4 | 23 deaths – See article on this tornado – A total of 90 people were injured. | | | | | | |
| EF2 | N of Fort Valley | Crawford, Peach | GA | 32.5998°N 83.9492°W | 20:15–20:22 | 6.7 mi (10.8 km) | 420 yd (380 m) |
| EF2 | A mobile home was flipped and destroyed, injuring one woman inside. A vehicle was flipped and rolled, a house had its roof completely removed and sustained partial exterior wall collapse, and a neighboring home suffered roof damage from flying debris. Numerous trees were snapped or uprooted, pecan farming equipment was overturned, and a farming shed was destroyed. | | | | | | |
| EF2 | S of Tuskegee to E of Beauregard | Macon, Lee | AL | 32.3455°N 85.7356°W | 20:27–20:57 | 29.07 mi (46.78 km) | 1,300 yd (1,200 m) |
| EF2 | A tornado formed from an embedded rotation within the squall that followed behind the supercell that spawned the initial Lee County EF4. At some points, the path of this tornado passed as close as 0.4 miles away from the original EF4 path. Many thousands of trees were damaged, including several large groves of trees that were completely mowed down. A few outbuildings were destroyed, manufactured homes sustained significant damage, several homes suffered varying degrees of roof damage, and a farm irrigation system was damaged. A brick church sustained shingle damage, and a cinder block building at a cemetery had its roof blown off. Another church lost roughly half of its roof. Two mobile homes were rolled over near the end of the tornado's path, resulting in one injury. | | | | | | |
| EF1 | NW of Honoraville | Butler, Crenshaw | AL | 31.9074°N 86.4802°W | 20:34–20:342 | 5.03 mi (8.10 km) | 50 yd (46 m) |
| EF1 | In Butler County, an outbuilding was damaged, the roof was blown off a single-story brick home, and numerous trees were snapped or uprooted. In Crenshaw county, numerous trees were uprooted, including one that fell onto a mobile home. A nearby outbuilding was damaged. This tornado was originally the first of two in close proximity, however, in November 2023, reanalysis discovered that it was one continuous tornado path from Butler into Crenshaw county. This was discovered using Planet satellite imagery. The starting point of the tornado was also adjusted slightly west of the initial point. | | | | | | |
| EF0 | Macon | Bibb | GA | 32.8296°N 83.6382°W | 20:36–20:38 | 1.1 mi (1.8 km) | 150 yd (140 m) |
| EF0 | A weak tornado impacted downtown Macon, causing minor roof, shingle, and window damage to several buildings. Three transformers were blown, signs were downed, a large flag pole was bent at a right angle about 3 ft (0.91 m) from its base, and several vehicles had their windows blown out. An anemometer recorded a peak gust of 66 mph (106 km/h) before it broke. Large tables were tossed. | | | | | | |
| EF1 | S of Huber | Twiggs | GA | 32.7023°N 83.5584°W | 20:42–20:44 | 1.2 mi (1.9 km) | 300 yd (270 m) |
| EF1 | A number of large trees were snapped or uprooted. One tree was downed onto a house. | | | | | | |
| EF0 | E of Workmore | Telfair | GA | 31.9255°N 82.9292°W | 21:05–21:09 | 4.1 mi (6.6 km) | 150 yd (140 m) |
| EF0 | The porch to a home was ripped from its concrete footings and tossed over 100 yd (91 m). Minor roof damage occurred to the home and a wooden power pole adjacent to the structure was snapped. Around a dozen trees were downed. | | | | | | |
| EF0 | ENE of Jacksonville | Telfair | GA | 31.8517°N 82.8568°W | 21:09 | 0.4 mi (0.64 km) | 100 yd (91 m) |
| EF0 | A chicken house was lifted and tossed 50 ft (15 m) into a nearby shed. Several trees were snapped. | | | | | | |
| EF0 | SSW of Inverness | Bullock | AL | 31.9637°N 85.7804°W | 21:15 | 0.42 mi (0.68 km) | 50 yd (46 m) |
| EF0 | Several trees snapped or uprooted. | | | | | | |
| EF1 | E of Toomsboro | Wilkinson | GA | 32.8071°N 83.0795°W | 21:18–21:20 | 3.3 mi (5.3 km) | 630 yd (580 m) |
| EF1 | Numerous trees were snapped or uprooted and some roof damage occurred to structures at a mine site. The tornado continued into an inaccessible woodland area. | | | | | | |
| EF0 | S of Rupert | Taylor | GA | 32.3809°N 84.2984°W | 21:18–21:24 | 6.6 mi (10.6 km) | 200 yd (180 m) |
| EF0 | Sporadic tree damage was observed. | | | | | | |
| EF1 | Southern Pine Mountain | Harris | GA | 32.8360°N 84.9421°W | 21:19–21:28 | 7.5 mi (12.1 km) | 900 yd (820 m) |
| EF1 | Hundreds of trees were downed, several of which fell on houses in the southern part of Pine Mountain. In addition, an apartment building had one of its second floor rooms destroyed by a fallen tree. | | | | | | |
| EF1 | S of Oconee | Washington | GA | 32.8477°N 82.9564°W | 21:24–21:25 | 0.5 mi (0.80 km) | 200 yd (180 m) |
| EF1 | Sections of shingles were removed from a house and the backyard shed on the property was flipped and heavily damaged. A number of trees were downed and snapped. | | | | | | |
| EF1 | SW of Tennille | Washington | GA | 32.8643°N 82.8495°W | 21:36–21:38 | 1.5 mi (2.4 km) | 290 yd (270 m) |
| EF1 | A large number of trees were snapped or uprooted. | | | | | | |
| EF0 | NW of Perry | Macon, Peach | GA | 32.4654°N 83.9072°W | 21:43–21:51 | 6.4 mi (10.3 km) | 300 yd (270 m) |
| EF0 | Numerous trees were snapped, metal was peeled from one outbuilding, and a mobile home suffered damage to its skirting and roof. Another outbuilding had one of its three south-facing doors blown off and thrown onto a nearby building, while a 30 ft (9.1 m) wooden fence was snapped at its posts. | | | | | | |
| EF2 | NW of Eufaula | Barbour | AL | 31.9653°N 85.3392°W | 21:45–21:55 | 6.68 mi (10.75 km) | 700 yd (640 m) |
| EF2 | Hundreds of trees were severely damaged, including a large area of trees that was completely mowed down. A large wooden double power pole was knocked down as well. | | | | | | |
| EF1 | S of Davisboro | Washington | GA | 32.9334°N 82.6144°W | 21:55 | 0.2 mi (0.32 km) | 85 yd (78 m) |
| EF1 | A farm outbuilding and an old concrete silo were damaged. The silo was collapsed with its concrete debris scattering and downing nearby power lines. | | | | | | |
| EF2 | N of Eufaula, AL to SW of Weston, GA | Barbour (AL), Quitman (GA), Stewart (GA), Webster (GA) | AL, GA | 31.9483°N 85.1537°W | 21:58–22:32 | 31 mi (50 km) | 860 yd (790 m) |
| EF2 | A rain-wrapped, high-end EF2 tornado destroyed a fire station north of Eufaula, along with several metal-framed industrial buildings and airplane hangars at and around Weedon Field. Multiple airplanes were damaged or destroyed, and numerous trees were snapped or uprooted. A few homes and mobile homes in the area were damaged as well. The tornado continued into Georgia, producing moderate tree damage in Quitman County before continuing into Stewart County. There, multiple large metal-framed barns were destroyed, and several large pieces of farming equipment were moved. A single-family home had its roof ripped off and most exterior walls collapsed as well. Several campers were flipped over and destroyed, and hundreds of trees were snapped or uprooted. The tornado continued into Webster County, snapping a few tree branches and flipping a portion of a large irrigation system before dissipating. | | | | | | |
| EF0 | SW of DeFuniak Springs | Walton | FL | 30.6553°N 86.3155°W | 22:28–22:41 | 12.12 mi (19.51 km) | 400 yd (370 m) |
| EF0 | A weak tornado touched down on Eglin Air Force Base property and moved northeast, producing scattered tree damage. | | | | | | |
| EF0 | E of Shorterville | Henry (AL), Clay (GA) | AL, GA | 31.5459°N 85.0784°W | 22:39–22:52 | 9.59 mi (15.43 km) | 75 yd (69 m) |
| EF0 | A weak tornado began in Henry County, Alabama, uprooting several trees. It continued into Clay County in Georgia where it removed from roofing material from a roadway, downed an irrigation system, and uprooted additional trees. | | | | | | |
| EF2 | Western Evans | Columbia | GA | 33.5354°N 82.2159°W | 22:44 | 1.52 mi (2.45 km) | 100 yd (91 m) |
| EF2 | This tornado impacted the western part of Evans, where numerous homes sustained minor to moderate damage. One well-built brick home had a large portion of its roof torn off, and vehicles were damaged by flying debris. Sheds and fences were destroyed, and numerous trees were snapped or uprooted. | | | | | | |
| EF1 | S of Slocomb | Geneva | AL | 31.0631°N 85.5226°W | 22:51–22:58 | 5.14 mi (8.27 km) | 300 yd (270 m) |
| EF1 | A single-family home had its entire garage roof and a portion of its main roof ripped off. A manufactured house immediately behind that structure was lifted off its anchor points and rotated 10–15 ft (3.0–4.6 m) from its original location. Other single-family homes, manufactured homes, and a barn suffered minor to moderate damage. Larger trees were snapped. One person was injured. | | | | | | |
| EF2 | SE of Clarks Hill | Edgefield | SC | 33.6098°N 82.0529°W | 22:53 | 5.05 mi (8.13 km) | 200 yd (180 m) |
| EF2 | Numerous large trees were snapped or uprooted in the Morgana community, some of which landed on homes and vehicles. Power poles were snapped, and several homes and a gas station sustained damage as well. At least four people were injured. | | | | | | |
| EF0 | W of Branchville | Orangeburg | SC | 33.2691°N 80.894°W | 23:03 | 0.16 mi (0.26 km) | 25 yd (23 m) |
| EF0 | Multiple trees were uprooted and snapped. | | | | | | |
| EF1 | E of Sunny Hills | Washington, Jackson | FL | 30.6928°N 85.4779°W | 23:33–23:38 | 5.27 mi (8.48 km) | 300 yd (270 m) |
| EF1 | In Washington County, several homes had tin roofing material stripped off, with the most severe case involving a metal canopy being blown 75 ft (23 m). Similar damage occurred to homes in Jackson County. Trees were snapped and uprooted throughout the tornado's path, and outbuildings were damaged or destroyed. Wooden projectiles were speared into the ground, and a trampoline and a doghouse were blown away as well. | | | | | | |
| EF1 | Red Bank | Lexington | SC | 33.9081°N 81.3538°W | 23:53 | 10.92 mi (17.57 km) | 100 yd (91 m) |
| EF1 | Numerous trees were snapped and uprooted, support columns at a church were damaged, and roof and property damage occurred to several homes. | | | | | | |
| EF1 | SE of Riceboro | Liberty | GA | 31.6807°N 81.4119°W | 23:58 | 7.85 mi (12.63 km) | 350 yd (320 m) |
| EF1 | Debris was tossed onto I-95, where a motorcyclist hit the debris and suffered injuries. A camper trailer was flipped and rolled about 20–30 ft (6.1–9.1 m), and a single-family home sustained minor shingle damage. | | | | | | |
| EF1 | Lexington | Lexington | SC | 33.9613°N 81.2383°W | 00:02 | 1.93 mi (3.11 km) | 50 yd (46 m) |
| EF1 | An awning at a gas station was damaged, a seafood restaurant had its porch roof blown off, and eight recreational vehicles were overturned at a business, some of which were moved nearly 50 yd (46 m). Two large trailers were overturned at another business, and several homes sustained minor roof damage. Numerous trees were snapped or uprooted. | | | | | | |
| EF1 | S of Boykin | Miller | GA | 31.0734°N 84.7113°W | 00:02–00:10 | 4.26 mi (6.86 km) | 150 yd (140 m) |
| EF1 | Two homes were blown off their cinder block foundations and destroyed, including one that was pushed 60 ft (18 m); the occupant to that house sustained severe injuries. A third house saw a corner of its roof peeled off and a portion of its wall blown in. Two center pivot irrigation systems were overturned. Several trees were snapped or uprooted. | | | | | | |
| EF1 | Columbia | Richland | SC | 34.0182°N 81.096°W | 00:13 | 1.46 mi (2.35 km) | 150 yd (140 m) |
| EF1 | Numerous trees were snapped or uprooted, many of which fell on homes and vehicles and inflicted severe damage. | | | | | | |
| EF1 | ENE of Bethany | Decatur | GA | 30.8766°N 84.6863°W | 00:18–00:24 | 4.59 mi (7.39 km) | 150 yd (140 m) |
| EF1 | Large trees were snapped, one of which fell on a home. | | | | | | |
| EF1 | Fort Jackson | Richland | SC | 34.06°N 80.9031°W | 00:33 | 0.6 mi (0.97 km) | 200 yd (180 m) |
| EF1 | Multiple trees were snapped and uprooted. | | | | | | |
| EF1 | S of Greensboro | Gadsden | FL | 30.5648°N 84.5978°W | 00:41–00:45 | 2.12 mi (3.41 km) | 275 yd (251 m) |
| EF1 | A single-wide mobile home was flipped, a few small utility poles were snapped, and a few homes suffered roof damage either from the tornado itself or fallen trees. | | | | | | |
| EF1 | NE of Omega | Tift | GA | 31.3552°N 83.5746°W | 00:49–00:52 | 0.72 mi (1.16 km) | 180 yd (160 m) |
| EF1 | Trees were snapped and uprooted. A large garage had an exterior wall bowed outward and sustained significant shingle damage. A large trailer filled with air conditioning units, estimated to weigh about 700 lb (320 kg), was moved about 3 ft (0.91 m). The metal roof of the building harboring the trailer and other vehicles were partially uplifted. | | | | | | |
| EF2 | Cairo | Grady | GA | 30.8619°N 84.2321°W | 00:54–01:00 | 2.69 mi (4.33 km) | 800 yd (730 m) |
| EF2 | This strong tornado caused significant damage in Cairo. Numerous trees in town were snapped or uprooted, some of which landed on structures. Many homes were damaged, including several that sustained roof and exterior wall loss. Power lines were downed, garages were destroyed, and several businesses sustained heavy damage as well. A mesonet station in town recorded a peak gust of 102 mph (164 km/h) as the tornado struck. Two people were injured. | | | | | | |
| EF0 | NW of Sopchoppy to SSW of Bethel | Wakulla | FL | 30.8619°N 84.2321°W | 01:03–01:26 | 18.41 mi (29.63 km) | 300 yd (270 m) |
| EF0 | A weak but long-tracked tornado began in the Apalachicola National Forest, damaging trees. A small shed-sized metal canopy was flipped, and a commercial sign suffered some minor damage too. | | | | | | |
| EF3 | E of Tallahassee to N of Lloyd | Leon, Jefferson | FL | 30.4934°N 84.1262°W | 01:18–01:25 | 6.5 mi (10.5 km) | 700 yd (640 m) |
| EF3 | A significant tornado began in eastern Leon County, destroying an outbuilding and snapping numerous trees. The most intense damage was inflicted to two well-built frame homes that were destroyed and left with only a few walls standing. Nearby cars were lofted and displaced, and multiple power poles were snapped. Several other homes sustained major structural damage as well. In western Jefferson County, numerous trees were snapped. Two people were injured. This is only the second EF3 or stronger tornado in Leon County based on reliable records going back to 1945. | | | | | | |
| EF0 | NNE of St. Marks | Wakulla | FL | 30.8619°N 84.2321°W | 01:42–01:46 | 0.66 mi (1.06 km) | 50 yd (46 m) |
| EF0 | Some trees were blown down and a debris ball was visible on radar. | | | | | | |

=== Beauregard–Smiths Station, Alabama/Talbotton, Georgia ===
Beauregard–Smiths Station, Alabama/Talbotton, Georgia
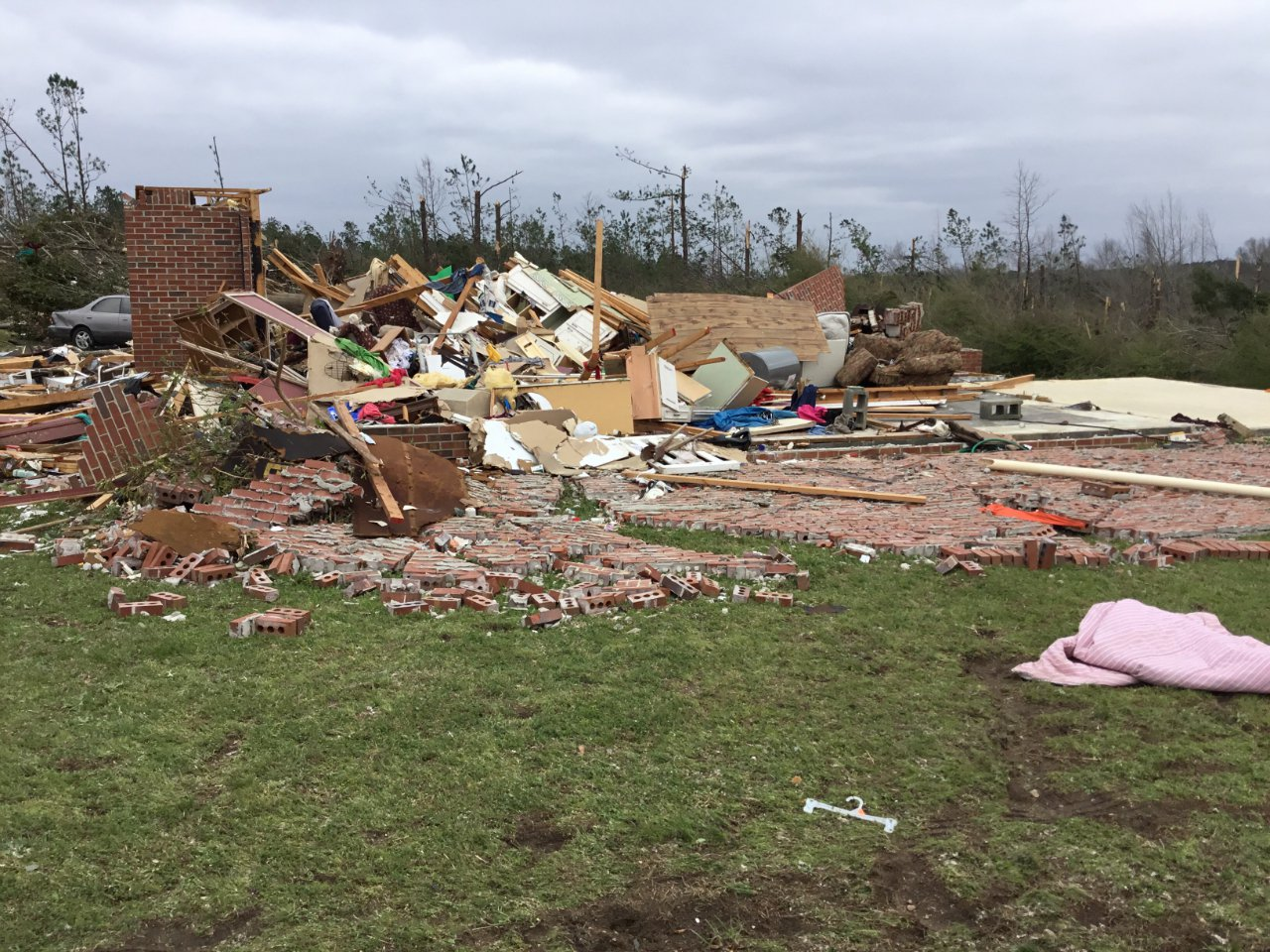
- EF4 damage to a well-built brick home in Beauregard, Alabama. This home was anchor-bolted to its foundation.

Meteorological history
- Formed: 2:00 p.m. CST (UTC−06:00), March 3, 2019
- Dissipated: 4:16 p.m. EST (UTC−05:00), March 3, 2019
- Duration: 76 minutes

EF4 tornado
- on the Enhanced Fujita scale
- Highest winds: 170 mph (270 km/h)

Overall effects
- Fatalities: 23
- Injuries: 97
- Damage: >$500,000 (2019 USD) (Damage estimates only covers tornado while in Georgia.)

This violent, deadly, and long-tracked wedge tornado touched down in eastern Macon County, Alabama, just northeast of US 80 (SR 8) and near the Lee County line. Initially a weak tornado, it snapped tree limbs and uprooted trees at EF0 to EF1 intensity as it moved east northeastward. Crossing into Lee County, EF1 damage was observed as additional trees were downed and a poorly constructed church had its roof blown off and sustained collapse of two unreinforced cinder block exterior walls. Widening into a large wedge tornado, it intensified to EF2 strength as it crossed County Road 11, where numerous large trees were snapped and denuded. A house and two storage sheds had sheet metal peeled off and scattered into a treeline. The tornado continued to intensify dramatically as it crossed Cave Mill Road and County Road 39, reaching its peak intensity of low-end EF4 and producing widespread, devastating damage as it impacted the southern part of Beauregard. A massive swath of large trees in this area was completely mowed down and debarked, and numerous manufactured homes were thrown and obliterated, with debris scattered in all directions and the metal frames of several of these homes being twisted around trees or never recovered. The most intense damage was inflicted to a well-built, anchor-bolted brick home that was leveled with a portion of the slab foundation swept clean of debris. Several block-foundation frame homes were leveled or swept completely away in this area, and windrowing of debris was noted. Multiple vehicles were lofted through the air and mangled beyond recognition, including one car that was wrapped around a tree. A large semi-truck was flipped over and wrapped around the base of a tree as well, a high-tension power line tower was toppled, and a few homes farther away from the center of the damage path had their roofs ripped off.

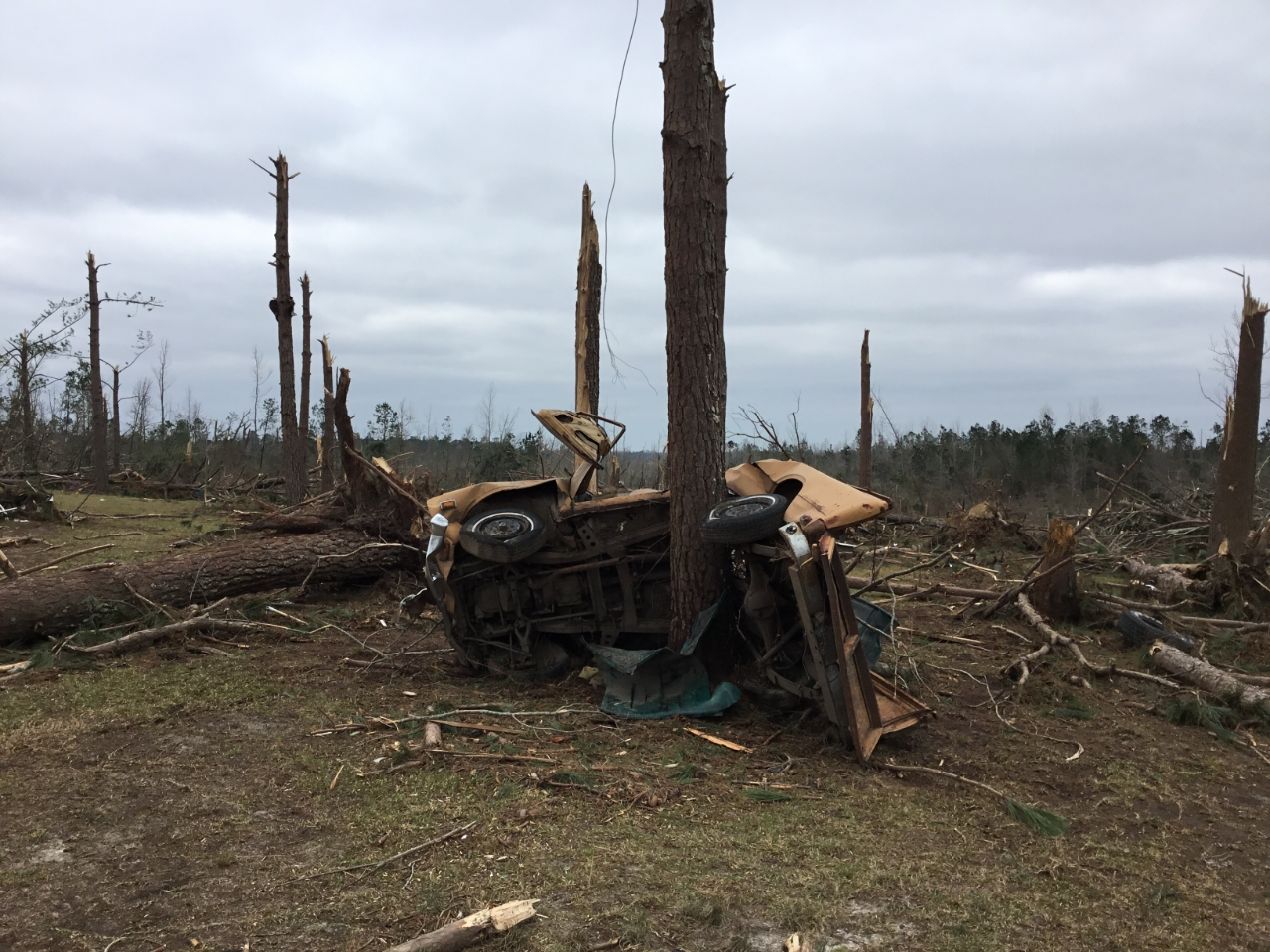
Car wrapped around a tree in Beauregard, Alabama

Continuing to the east-northeast, the tornado weakened to EF3 strength as it crossed SR 51 and struck the small neighboring community of Dupree. Many additional manufactured homes were completely destroyed with debris strewn downwind, numerous trees were snapped and debarked, and frame homes sustained total roof and exterior wall loss in this area. The tornado moved slightly north of due east, crossing Lee County Road 100 and Lee County Road 166, snapping numerous trees as it weakened further to high-end EF2 strength. A well-anchored manufactured home in this area was ripped from its foundation and blown 100 ft (30 m) but remained mostly intact. A frame home had major roof damage, windows blown out, and a few exterior walls ripped off. Crossing County Road 165 and County Road 40, high-end EF2 damage continued as a house lost its roof and exterior walls, another home had much of its roof torn off, several manufactured homes were damaged or destroyed, and many trees were snapped. Farther along the path, low-end EF2 damage was observed to the west of SR 169, where numerous trees were snapped and a few structures at the periphery of the damage path sustained minor impacts. Further weakening occurred as the tornado crossed and continued to the east of SR 169, downing trees at EF1 intensity.

The tornado began to strengthen again just east-northeast of this location, reaching EF2 intensity as it crossed County Road 245. A house lost much of its roof, and another home sustained less severe damage in this area as well. The tornado then crossed County Road 179 and entered the town of Smiths Station at high-end EF2 strength. In Smiths Station, multiple small and poorly constructed frame homes lost their roofs and exterior walls, a bar and music venue sustained major structural damage, a gas station sustained moderate damage, and numerous trees were downed. A cell tower was toppled to the ground, blocking US 280/431 in both directions for many hours, and a billboard sign was damaged, part of which was reportedly found roughly 20 mi (32 km) away in Georgia near Hamilton. East of town, EF2 damage continued as two metal transmission towers were knocked down, homes were damaged, and many large trees were snapped and/or uprooted, including several that landed on single-family homes and other structures and caused major damage.

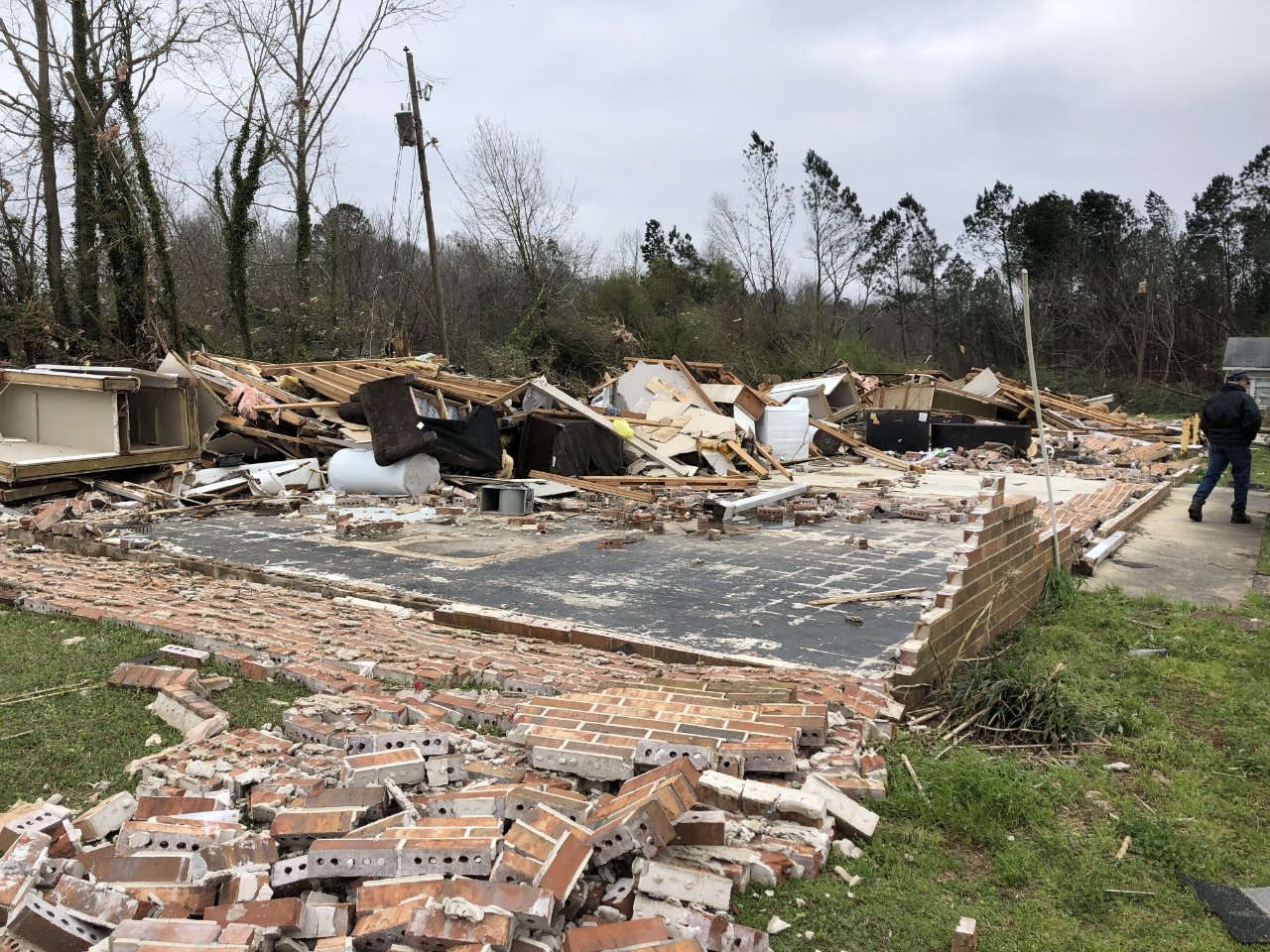
EF3 damage to an unanchored brick duplex in Talbotton, Georgia

Crossing the Chattahoochee River, the tornado exited Alabama and entered Muscogee County, Georgia, moving through sparsely populated areas and downing numerous trees at EF1 strength before crossing I-185 (SR 411). As the tornado strengthened and passed between Barin and Fortson, a small area of low-end EF3 damage was noted as a large cell tower was toppled over and mangled along US 27 (SR 1). Several one inch in diameter metal guide wires were snapped at this location, and a nearby swath of trees was flattened to the ground. Numerous additional trees were downed at EF1 strength as the tornado moved into Harris County and passed south of Ellerslie. Multiple homes sustained mostly shingle and carport damage in this area, though one home sustained considerable damage to its attic and second floor. Paralleling and eventually crossing SR 315, the tornado reached EF2 strength as countless trees were snapped or uprooted, and a house sustained major damage to its second floor. Further intensification occurred as the tornado entered Talbot County and again reached low-end EF3 intensity as it struck the rural community of Baughville, where the Humble Zion Church was destroyed. The church was completely flattened, but was not anchored to its foundation. Another church in this area was also destroyed, along with a mobile home. A two-story frame home also sustained severe damage.

The tornado briefly weakened to high-end EF1 strength past Baughville, downing many trees in heavily forested areas. Once again, regaining low-end EF3 strength, the tornado proceeded to strike the north side of Talbotton, causing major damage in town. Numerous manufactured homes were obliterated, with debris being scattered up to a quarter mile away through nearby woods. Multiple other manufactured homes were badly damaged. Several frame homes also sustained severe damage, including one that was shifted 10 ft (3.0 m) off of its foundation, and another that had its second floor removed. Vehicles were piled atop each other and damaged by flying debris, and an unanchored brick duplex was swept from its foundation and leveled, leaving only the foundation slab and a pile of debris behind. Continuing to the east-northeast past Talbotton, a manufactured home was rolled and destroyed. Mostly EF1 damage was observed beyond this point, though a final area of EF2 tree damage occurred in a small valley near the concurrent US 80 and SR 540. Hundreds of trees were snapped off at the base in this area before the tornado began to rapidly weaken and shrink in size. A few more trees were snapped near the intersection of George Smith Rd and Carl Mathis Rd before the tornado dissipated.

There were 23 people killed by this violent tornado, with all of the fatalities occurring in Lee County, Alabama; 90 others were injured, some critically. The tornado was on the ground for 68.73 mi (110.61 km) and reached a peak width of 1,600 yd (1,500 m). This was the first violent (EF4 or EF5) tornado in the United States since April 29, 2017 and the deadliest since the 2013 Moore tornado. It was also the first violent tornado in Lee County since 1875 and the first deadly tornado to strike Lee County since 1953.

== Non-tornadic impacts ==
The cold section of the tornado outbreak produced a snowstorm across much of the United States. In Colorado, 16 in (41 cm) of snow fell at Estes Park and 3.7 in (9.4 cm) fell at Denver International Airport. 13 in (33 cm) of snow fell in Squaw Valley, California. As the storm tracked eastward, snow was wreaking havoc on parts of the Four Corner States and the Midwest, closing roads and cancelling over 700 flights. Shaping up to be much more intense than the first storm for the US Northeast, The National Weather Service issued winter storm warnings from West Virginia to Maine. Closer to the Atlantic coast a mix of rain and snow affected major cities such as Baltimore, Philadelphia, and New York City, although in Boston, snowfall totals were over a foot even along the ocean. Many schools in the Philadelphia metropolitan area had delayed openings, with Amtrak modifying certain trains. This led to a snow day in New York City on March 4, where a total observed snowfall was 5.0 in (13 cm) in Central Park. A plane in Maine slid off a runway due to the ice, injuring 5 people. Almost 60,000 customers in the Northeast lost power. The storm also affected Atlantic Canada, although the track of the low was much closer to the shoreline than the previous storm, resulting in mixed precipitation for Nova Scotia and Prince Edward Island, with heftier snowfall totals in New Brunswick and Newfoundland. 24 cm (9.4 in) of snow fell in Moncton and winds gusted to 170 kilometres per hour (110 mph) in Wreckhouse.

== Aftermath ==
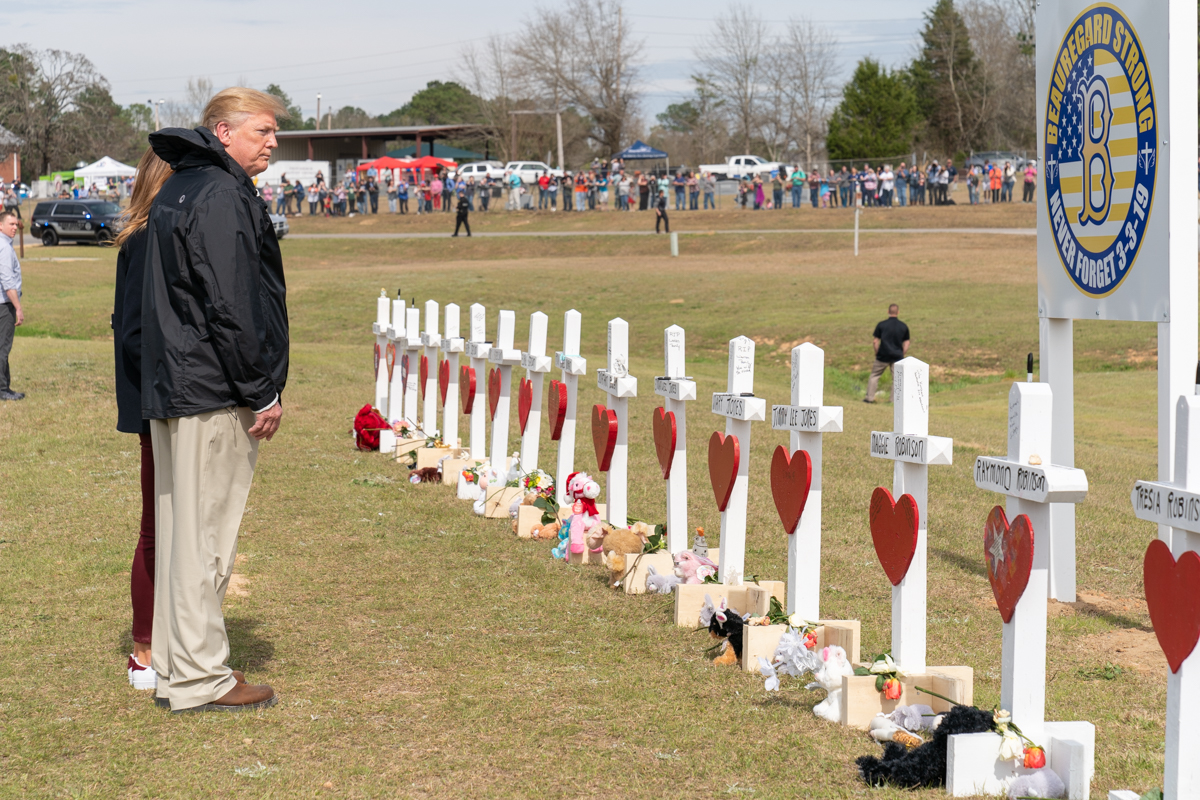
President Donald Trump and First Lady Melania Trump visit a memorial for victims in Alabama

Twenty-three deaths occurred as a result of a single tornado that moved through Lee County, Alabama. A majority of the deaths occurred in and around the small Alabama town of Beauregard. Four of the dead were children. Ten of the victims were from one family. Sixty patients were received at the East Alabama Medical Center; however, only four remained hospitalized on March 4. Many people were initially reported as missing. Drones with heat-seeking devices were utilized in the search effort for survivors while ground crews had to wait for morning light on March 4. In a later report on March 6, all tornado victims in Alabama have been accounted for.

== See also ==
- Weather of 2019
- List of North American tornadoes and tornado outbreaks
- List of F4 and EF4 tornadoes
  - List of F4 and EF4 tornadoes (2010–2019)
- List of United States tornadoes from January to March 2019
