= Lady (American rapper) =

American singer-songwriter

- Born: Shameka Shanta Brown; July 31, 1989 (age 36); Talbotton, Georgia, United States
- Genres: Hip hop, dirty rap
- Occupation: Rapper
- Instrument: Vocals
- Years active: 2010–present
- Labels: Big Gates Records, Interscope Records
- Website: thisislady.com

Shameka Shanta Brown (born July 31, 1989), better known by her stage name Lady, is an American rapper. She was signed to rapper Plies' record label Big Gates Records on April 1, 2010. She has released three albums. Lady's songs have been featured on TV shows including Girls, Ray Donovan, and Skins.

== Early life and education ==
Shameka Shanta Brown was born in Talbotton, Georgia. She graduated from Central High School in Talbotton in 2007. During her senior year at Central, Brown was class president.

== Career ==
On April 1, 2010, Brown signed a record deal with the independent recording label Big Gates Records. She released the mixtapes Bitch From Around the Way, Bitch From Around the Way II, and Bout Dat Life.

Lady's song "Yankin" was prominently featured in a wedding scene in the HBO television series Girls and her song "Twerk" was featured in Showtime's television series Ray Donovan. The UK's Channel 4 show Skins has used her track "I Need". Lady and her songs have been discussed on Howard Stern's radio talk show, The Howard Stern Show.

== Discography ==
Mixtapes

- 2010: Bitch From Around The Way
- 2010: Bitch From Around The Way 2
- 2011: Bout Dat Life with Andre Lightskin
- 2011: Jack Yo Shit with Andre Lightskin
- 2011: Bonafide Bitch
- TBA: Jack Yo Shit 2
- TBA: Lip Service
