= Talbotton, Georgia =

- City
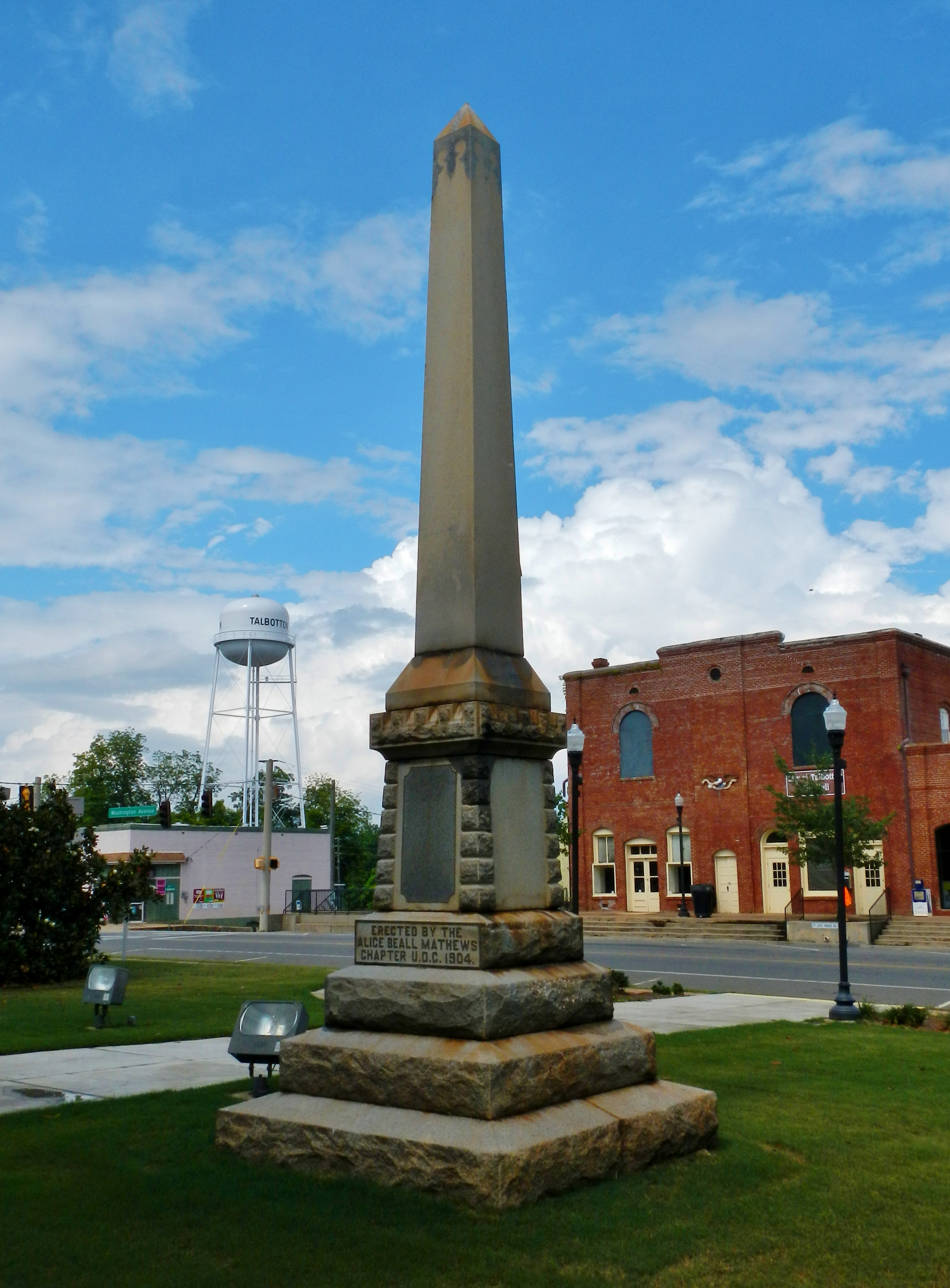
- Confederate Monument in Talbotton, 2012

- Location in Talbot County and the state of Georgia
- Coordinates: 32°40′41″N 84°32′23″W
- Country: United States
- State: Georgia
- County: Talbot

Area
  - Total: 3.12 sq mi (8.09 km^{2})
  - Land: 3.10 sq mi (8.04 km^{2})
  - Water: 0.019 sq mi (0.05 km^{2})
- Elevation: 732 ft (223 m)

Population (2020)
  - Total: 742
  - Density: 239.0/sq mi (92.27/km^{2})
- Time zone: UTC−5 (Eastern (EST))
  - Summer (DST): UTC−4 (EDT)
- ZIP code: 31827
- Area code: 706
- FIPS code: 13-75244
- GNIS feature ID: 0333180
- Website: talbottonga.org

Talbotton is the county seat and the largest city in Talbot County, Georgia, United States. As of the 2020 census, Talbotton had a population of 742.

== History ==
Talbotton was founded in 1828 as the seat of the newly formed Talbot County. Both the county and the town were named for Matthew Talbot, 30th Governor of Georgia.

Talbotton may be best known in history as the place where the immigrant Straus family got their start in retail sales in the 19th century. In 1896, the family acquired R. H. Macy & Co. in New York.

== Geography ==
According to the United States Census Bureau, the city has a total area of 3.1 square miles (8.0 km^{2}), of which 3.1 square miles (8.0 km^{2}) is land and 0.32% is water.

Highways include U.S. Route 80, and Georgia State Routes 90 and 208.

== Climate ==
Talbotton has a humid subtropical climate (Köppen Cfa), with hot, humid summers and mild winters. The record high of 110 °F (43 °C) and record low of −6 °F (−21 °C) were recorded on July 19, 1913, and February 13, 1899, respectively.

On March 3, 2019, an EF4 tornado struck the town at low-end EF3 strength, causing major damage to structures and trees in the town.

Climate data for Talbotton, 1981-2010 normals, extremes 1893-present
Month	Jan	Feb	Mar	Apr	May	Jun	Jul	Aug	Sep	Oct	Nov	Dec	Year
Record high °F (°C)	82 (28)	83 (28)	93 (34)	96 (36)	100 (38)	105 (41)	110 (43)	107 (42)	108 (42)	100 (38)	89 (32)	83 (28)	110 (43)
Mean daily maximum °F (°C)	55.3 (12.9)	59.8 (15.4)	67.2 (19.6)	73.9 (23.3)	80.7 (27.1)	86.6 (30.3)	89.2 (31.8)	88.0 (31.1)	83.2 (28.4)	74.3 (23.5)	66.3 (19.1)	56.7 (13.7)	73.4 (23.0)
Mean daily minimum °F (°C)	32.1 (0.1)	35.2 (1.8)	41.2 (5.1)	48.4 (9.1)	56.9 (13.8)	65.5 (18.6)	69.0 (20.6)	68.4 (20.2)	62.2 (16.8)	49.9 (9.9)	40.9 (4.9)	33.8 (1.0)	50.3 (10.2)
Record low °F (°C)	−5 (−21)	−6 (−21)	12 (−11)	25 (−4)	33 (1)	42 (6)	50 (10)	50 (10)	34 (1)	23 (−5)	8 (−13)	1 (−17)	−6 (−21)
Average precipitation inches (mm)	4.38 (111)	4.89 (124)	5.38 (137)	3.65 (93)	3.19 (81)	4.28 (109)	5.00 (127)	3.83 (97)	3.51 (89)	3.03 (77)	3.95 (100)	4.61 (117)	49.7 (1,262)
Average precipitation days (≥ 0.01 in)	7.6	7.5	7.4	6.3	6.8	8.3	8.6	7.5	5.7	5.5	6.1	7.4	84.7
Source: NOAA

== Demographics ==
Historical population
Census	Pop.	Note	%±
1870	796		—
1880	1,008		26.6%
1890	1,140		13.1%
1900	1,131		−0.8%
1910	1,081		−4.4%
1920	1,093		1.1%
1930	1,064		−2.7%
1940	1,060		−0.4%
1950	1,175		10.8%
1960	1,163		−1.0%
1970	1,045		−10.1%
1980	1,140		9.1%
1990	1,046		−8.2%
2000	1,019		−2.6%
2010	970		−4.8%
2020	742		−23.5%
U.S. Decennial Census; 1850-1870 1870-1880; 1890-1910 1920-1930; 1940 1950 1960; 1970 1980 1990; 2000 2010

Talbotton racial composition as of 2020
Race	Num.	Perc.
White (non-Hispanic)	122	16.44%
Black or African American (non-Hispanic)	600	80.86%
Native American	1	0.13%
Asian	2	0.27%
Other/Mixed	7	0.94%
Hispanic or Latino	10	1.35%

As of the 2020 United States census, there were 742 people, 372 households, and 222 families residing in the city.

== Education ==
The Talbot County School District headquarters is located in the city as well as the only school building in the entire county. The district and school has 48 full-time teachers and over 792 students.

- Central Elementary/High School

== Notable people ==
- John W. Bower, signatory to the Texas Declaration of Independence, member of the House of Representatives of the Republic of Texas, and Chief justice of Refugio County, Texas
- Charles Henry Jones, journalist, editor, and political figure, born in Talbotton
- Clarence Jordan, farmer and New Testament Greek scholar; born in Talbotton
- Lady, American rapper; born in Talbotton
- Isidor Strauss, U.S. Representative from the NY-15 district (1894–1895) and co-founder of Macy's Department Store, who died during the sinking of the R.M.S. Titanic, lived in Talbotton as a youth
- George W. Towns, U.S. Representative, and the 39th governor of Georgia from 1847 to 1851; former resident of Talbotton.
- Elizabeth Evelyn Wright, founder of Voorhees College; born in Talbotton
