= List of United States tornadoes in April 2019 =

United States tornadoes in April 2019
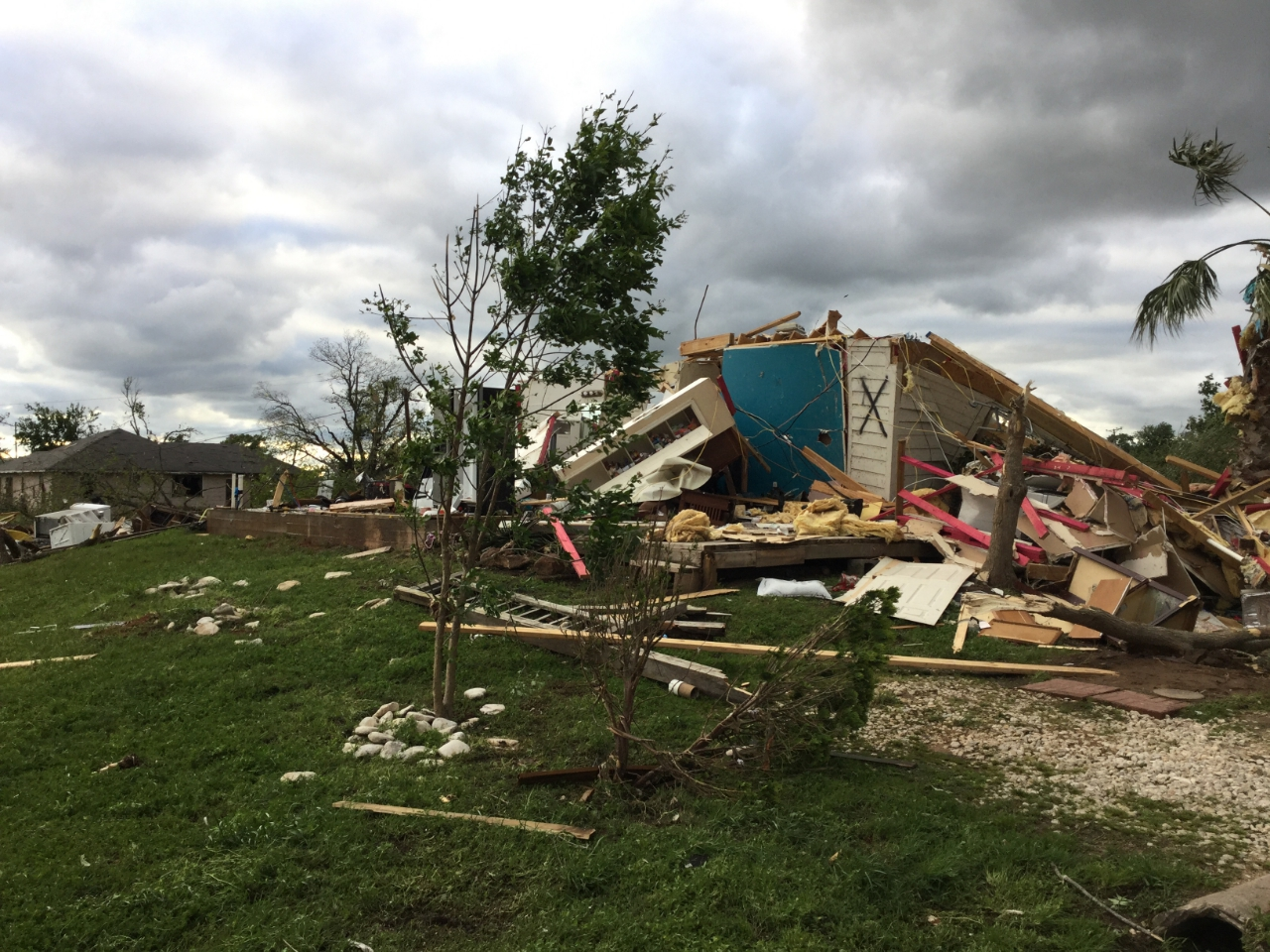
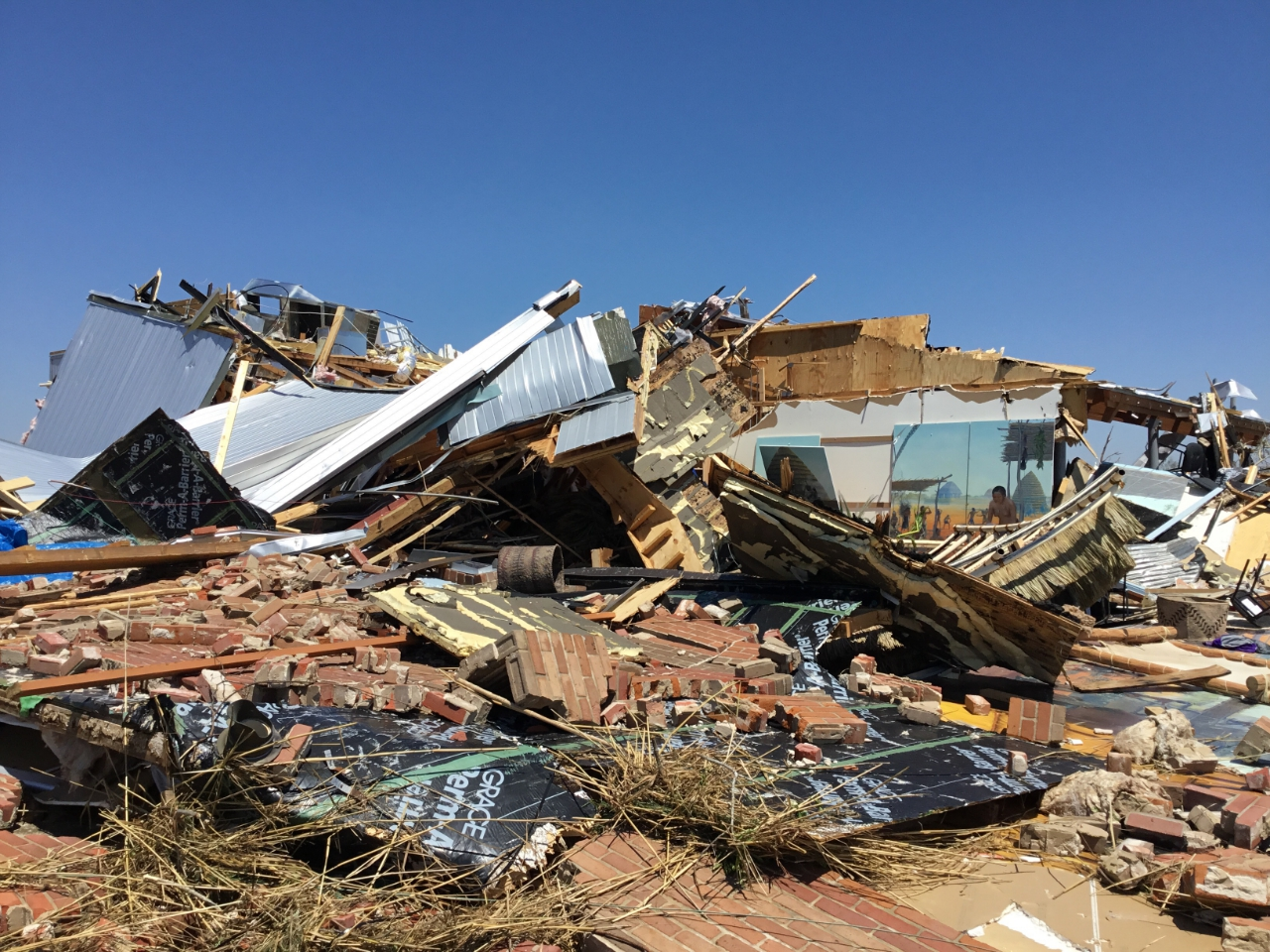
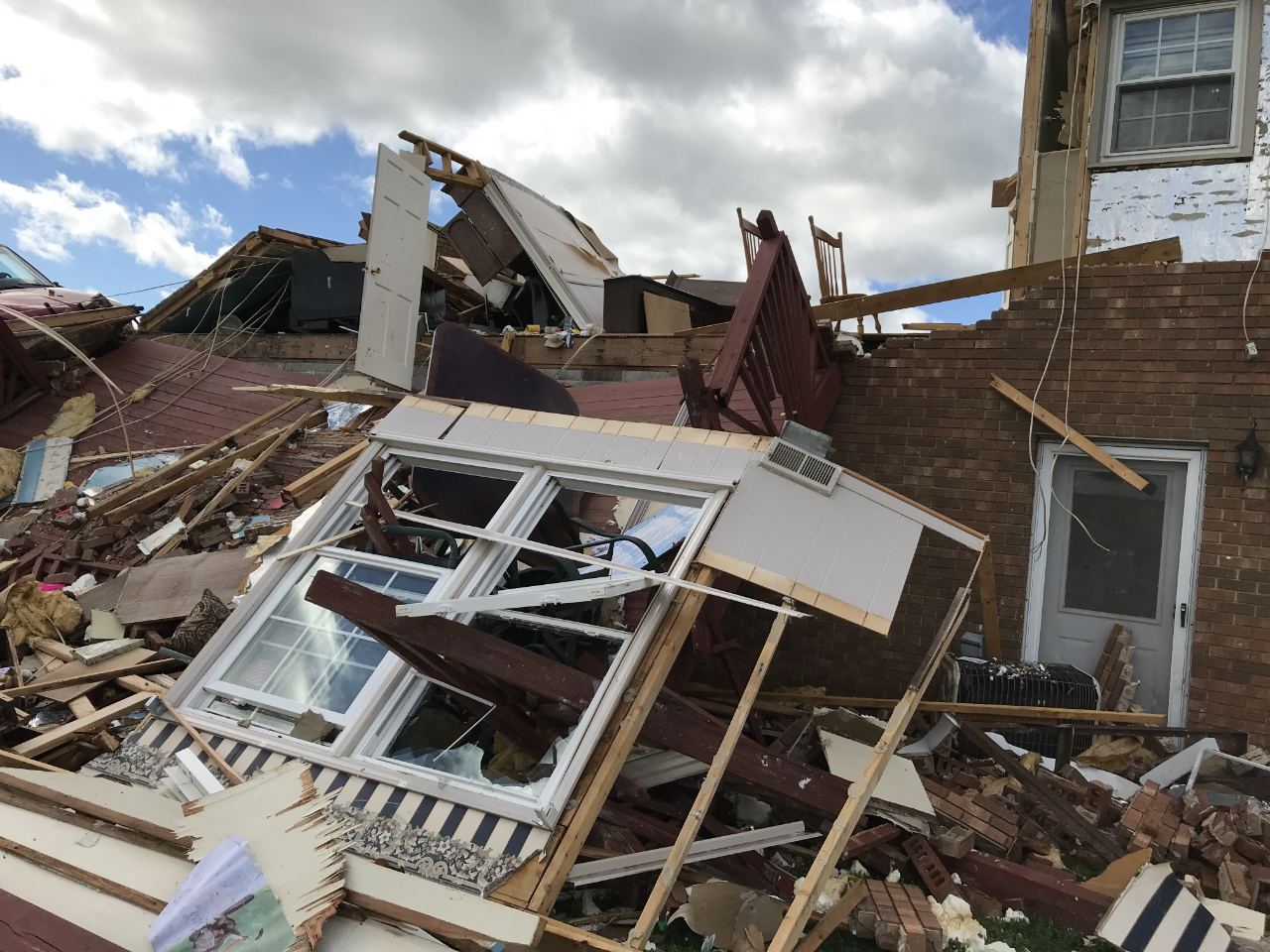
- Clockwise from top: A home destroyed by an EF3 tornado that struck Franklin, Texas on April 13; A brick home in Rocky Mount, Virginia damaged following a short-tracked EF3 tornado on April 19; The Caddo Mounds State Historic Site museum in Weeping Mary, Texas destroyed following an EF3 tornado on April 13.
- Timespan: April 6–30
- Maximum rated tornado: EF3 tornado: Franklin, Texas on April 13; Alto, Texas on April 13; Sydnorsville, Virginia on April 19; Ruston, Louisiana on April 25; Blue–Lane, Oklahoma on April 30
- Tornadoes: 275
- Fatalities: 7
- Injuries: 75

This page documents all tornadoes confirmed by various weather forecast offices of the National Weather Service in the United States in April 2019.

== United States yearly total ==
Confirmed tornadoes by Enhanced Fujita rating
EFU	EF0	EF1	EF2	EF3	EF4	EF5	Total
179	655	540	119	33	3	0	1,529

== April ==
Confirmed tornadoes by Enhanced Fujita rating
EFU	EF0	EF1	EF2	EF3	EF4	EF5	Total
18	91	127	34	5	0	0	275

=== April 6 event ===
List of confirmed tornadoes – Saturday, April 6, 2019 (Note: All dates are based on the local time zone where the tornado touched down; however, all times are in Coordinated Universal Time for consistency.)
EF#	Location	County / Parish	State	Start Coord.	Time (UTC)	Path length	Max width
EF0	San Gabriel	Milam	TX	30.6936°N 97.1968°W	19:10–19:12	0.31 mi (0.50 km)	150 yd (140 m)
EF0	A brief tornado stuck San Gabriel and severely damaged an old business. A church and a few sheds were also damaged, and several trees were downed.						
EF0	NE of Cameron	Milam	TX	30.9206°N 96.917°W	20:12	0.1 mi (0.16 km)	25 yd (23 m)
EF0	A brief tornado caused no damage.						
EF0	NW of Calvert	Robertson	TX	31.0061°N 96.7239°W	20:38	0.1 mi (0.16 km)	25 yd (23 m)
EF0	A brief rope tornado caused no damage.						

=== April 7 event ===
List of confirmed tornadoes – Sunday, April 7, 2019
EF#	Location	County / Parish	State	Start Coord.	Time (UTC)	Path length	Max width
EF0	SE of Beeville	Bee	TX	28.3691°N 97.6643°W	12:24–12:25	0.58 mi (0.93 km)	30 yd (27 m)
EF0	A tornado at Chase Field damaged approximately 50 unsecured RVs, 12 of which were severely damaged or destroyed. Several hangars had roof damage, with asphalt roofing materials blown off onto the airport tarmac, and several unsecured, full sized single-wide mobile homes were blown over.						
EF1	Pasadena	Harris	TX	29.6502°N 95.2018°W	17:42–17:44	0.73 mi (1.17 km)	50 yd (46 m)
EF1	Numerous street light poles were snapped, a building sustained collapse of an exterior wall, and many trees were downed, with large limbs stripped and tree trunks snapped in a few instances.						
EF0	SE of Montgomery	Montgomery	TX	30.3189°N 95.6445°W	17:58–17:59	0.03 mi (0.048 km)	30 yd (27 m)
EF0	Numerous trees were down, with one falling on a trailer.						
EF1	S of Centreville	Wilkinson	MS	31.0184°N 91.0712°W	23:02–23:04	1.72 mi (2.77 km)	125 yd (114 m)
EF1	At least a dozen trees were either snapped or uprooted, several power poles and lines were snapped, and a mobile home was rolled off its foundation and wrapped around a large tree.						
EF1	E of Acy	Ascension	LA	30.2184°N 90.7981°W	00:44–00:47	0.79 mi (1.27 km)	50 yd (46 m)
EF1	A Tornado with estimated max winds of 90 mph snapped and uprooted trees near Louisiana Highway 22. Only minor roof damage occurred to structures in the path.						
EF0	S of Kenner	Jefferson	LA	29.9528°N 90.2369°W	01:19–01:22	2.58 mi (4.15 km)	50 yd (46 m)
EF0	A low-end EF-0 tornado caused spotted tree damage. The tops of power poles were snapped and power lines downed.						

=== April 8 event ===
List of confirmed tornadoes – Monday, April 8, 2019
EF#	Location	County / Parish	State	Start Coord.	Time (UTC)	Path length	Max width
EF0	N of Hayden	Blount	AL	33.9128°N 86.7689°W	10:15–10:19	2.18 mi (3.51 km)	325 yd (297 m)
EF0	This tornado initially traversed inaccessible areas of Hayden Mountain before reaching a slightly more populated area, where a home and a barn were damaged, a second home sustained roof and siding damage, and a third home had a tree fall on it. In addition, a newer barn/shed had a part of its roof damaged, and numerous trees were downed.						
EF1	ESE of Blountsville to SSW of Brookville	Blount	AL	34.0754°N 86.5272°W	10:44–10:53	6.3 mi (10.1 km)	1,175 yd (1,074 m)
EF1	At least 20 structures sustained varying degrees of damage: several chicken barns were damaged, a large hay barn and two smaller farm buildings were destroyed, and homes sustained relatively minor damage. Many trees were either snapped or uprooted along the path.						
EF1	NNW of Douglas to SSW of Guntersville	Marshall	AL	34.2274°N 86.3294°W	11:10–11:29	6.1 mi (9.8 km)	219 yd (200 m)
EF1	Two single family homes sustained minor roof damage, a large unanchored shed was destroyed, and a few mobile homes and site-built homes sustained minor to significant roof damage. The tornado lifted shortly after crossing U.S. Highway 431 between Albertville and Gunterville, where two large retail buildings sustained minor roof and HVAC damage. Many trees and tree limbs were downed along the path, some of which landed on power lines. One person was injured in a mobile home.						

=== April 12 event ===
List of confirmed tornadoes – Friday, April 12, 2019
EF#	Location	County / Parish	State	Start Coord.	Time (UTC)	Path length	Max width
EF1	WNW of Pewee Valley to W of Ballardsville	Oldham	KY	38.3237°N 85.5185°W	10:45–10:54	8.3 mi (13.4 km)	300 yd (270 m)
EF1	Several homes were impacted, with one home having its front porch columns collapsed and front half of the roof thrown about 100 yards (91 m). Another home had a long gutter ripped off and thrown, and a third home had a tree fall on it. Most of the path consisted of snapped and uprooted trees.						
EF0	NW of South Charleston	Clark	OH	39.8601°N 83.6669°W	12:32–12:33	0.75 mi (1.21 km)	25 yd (23 m)
EF0	A brief tornado damaged grain bins and destroyed a barn, with debris from the barn being carried over 1,200 feet (370 m) away.						
EFU	SW of South Vienna	Clark	OH	39.9074°N 83.6299°W	12:34–12:36	0.96 mi (1.54 km)	25 yd (23 m)
EFU	A brief tornado caught on video moved over open fields, causing no damage.						
EF0	ESE of Seminole to SSW of Duncan	Harnett	NC	35.45°N 78.95°W	22:40–22:44	4.9 mi (7.9 km)	100 yd (91 m)
EF0	A weak tornado touched down in a wooded area and tracked through Raven Rock State Park, intermittently snapping or uprooting trees.						

=== April 13 event ===
List of confirmed tornadoes – Saturday, April 13, 2019
EF#	Location	County / Parish	State	Start Coord.	Time (UTC)	Path length	Max width	Summary
EF3	NW of Hearne to Franklin to SSW of Marquez	Milam, Robertson, Leon	TX	30.8832°N 96.6999°W	15:50–16:45	32.48 mi (52.27 km)	250 yd (230 m)	See section on this tornado
EF1	NW of Ratcliff to SSW of Alto	Houston	TX	31.3846°N 95.202°W	16:26–16:37	8.9 mi (14.3 km)	200 yd (180 m)	This tornado snapped and uprooted trees and severely damaged a double-wide mobile home, pushing it into a wooded area. Four of its occupants were injured but later released from the hospital.
EF2	SSW of Alto	Cherokee	TX	31.5612°N 95.1042°W	16:46–16:48	0.8 mi (1.3 km)	400 yd (370 m)	This tornado initially snapped hundreds of trees before destroying two mobile homes and tearing the roof off of a house. Several vehicles were tossed and damaged as well.
EF2	Alto	Cherokee	TX	31.6405°N 95.0805°W	16:52–17:00	2.5 mi (4.0 km)	400 yd (370 m)	This tornado struck Alto after the previous event lifted. Several homes were significantly damaged in town, including one home that was shifted off of its foundation and largely destroyed. It then passed over the Alto ISD campus, where a gymnasium sustained collapse of a masonry exterior wall. The roofs of other structures on campus were also damaged. Trees were snapped or uprooted as well. The EF3 tornado that hit Alto a couple hours later crossed the damage path of this tornado.
EF1	E of Buffalo to SE of Jewett	Leon	TX	31.3242°N 96.1165°W	17:12–17:19	11.22 mi (18.06 km)	150 yd (140 m)	This tornado ripped small portions of roofing material off of two houses and snapped trees.
EF0	SSE of Hearne	Robertson	TX	30.7303°N 96.5496°W	17:14–17:19	2.3 mi (3.7 km)	50 yd (46 m)	A weak tornado was caught on video over open farmland. No damage was reported.
EF2	W of Lovelady	Houston	TX	31.0789°N 95.5773°W	17:20–17:24	6.03 mi (9.70 km)	100 yd (91 m)	A house had its metal roof torn off, with roofing scattered up to 100 yd (91 m) away. A double-wide mobile home was completely destroyed, trees were snapped and denuded, and vehicles were tossed and damaged.
EF3	ENE of Crockett to NE of Reklaw	Houston, Cherokee, Nacogdoches, Rusk	TX	31.428°N 95.2718°W	18:00–19:00	41.13 mi (66.19 km)	880 yd (800 m)	2 deaths – See section on this tornado – 20 people were injured.
EF0	SE of Ratcliff	Houston	TX	31.367°N 95.079°W	18:45–18:47	0.16 mi (0.26 km)	50 yd (46 m)	Tornado occurred in the Davy Crockett National Forest, however the full path is unknown.
EF1	SW of Chireno	Nacogdoches	TX	31.4732°N 94.3811°W	19:38–19:39	0.77 mi (1.24 km)	100 yd (91 m)	This tornado uprooted numerous trees in a heavily wooded area.
EF1	E of Newellton to N of Gilbert	Tensas	LA	32.1768°N 91.2305°W	21:04–21:30	17.25 mi (27.76 km)	1,230 yd (1,120 m)	A large, rain-wrapped, high-end EF1 wedge tornado destroyed one mobile home while rolling a second. An empty fertilizer tank and farm equipment tires were lofted a considerable distance. An older home had its roof ripped off and several other houses suffered lesser roof damage as well. Some outbuildings and mobile homes were damaged, including a few that were pushed off their cinder blocks. Many trees were snapped or uprooted.
EF1	N of Newellton	Tensas	LA	32.1284°N 91.2393°W	21:13–21:19	4.98 mi (8.01 km)	950 yd (870 m)	Trees and power poles were snapped.
EF1	SW of Mound	Madison	LA	32.2438°N 91.097°W	21:35–21:38	0.97 mi (1.56 km)	840 yd (770 m)	Several trees were snapped or uprooted, and some tree limbs fell onto an outbuilding.
EF0	SSW of Mound	Madison	LA	32.2916°N 91.0522°W	21:44–21:50	2.81 mi (4.52 km)	50 yd (46 m)	Trained storm spotters observed a tornado. No damage occurred.
EF2	Northeastern Vicksburg to SSW of Phoenix	Warren, Yazoo	MS	32.3737°N 90.8291°W	21:57–22:43	20.2 mi (32.5 km)	700 yd (640 m)	This was the first of three strong tornadoes that touched down in Vicksburg. Numerous trees were snapped or uprooted in subdivisions at the northeastern edge of town, some of which fell on homes and power lines. The most intense damage occurred farther along the path, where several power poles and numerous large trees were snapped at their bases.
EF2	Southern Vicksburg	Warren	MS	32.309°N 90.8909°W	22:04–22:15	4.33 mi (6.97 km)	440 yd (400 m)	This was the second of three strong tornadoes that touched down in Vicksburg. At the beginning of the path, plants and materials were damaged at a Walmart. A strip mall had much of its roof torn off and its front windows and doors blown outward. A large metal Taco Bell sign pole was bent over nearby. The roof of another business, the canopy of a Kroger gas station, a nearby sign, and several trees were damaged as well.
EF2	Vicksburg	Warren	MS	32.34°N 90.88°W	22:08–22:16	2.44 mi (3.93 km)	175 yd (160 m)	This tornado struck Vicksburg immediately after the previous one. The roof of a home was ripped off, collapsing the front facade of the structure. A small business building suffered minor roof damage. Numerous trees were snapped and uprooted, one of which caused extensive damage to a home upon falling.
EF0	NW of Bentonia	Yazoo	MS	32.6992°N 90.347°W	23:00–23:06	2.92 mi (4.70 km)	25 yd (23 m)	A few trees were snapped and uprooted.
EF1	S of Goodman	Attala, Holmes	MS	32.9184°N 89.9163°W	23:42–23:44	1.55 mi (2.49 km)	100 yd (91 m)	A brief tornado snapped trees in the Big Black River bottom.
EF1	ENE of West	Attala	MS	33.2165°N 89.6931°W	00:06–00:07	0.51 mi (0.82 km)	50 yd (46 m)	Numerous trees were snapped and a power pole was broken as well.
EF0	SSE of Delhi	Madison	LA	32.2927°N 91.4037°W	00:09–00:16	4.43 mi (7.13 km)	50 yd (46 m)	A tornado debris signature was evident on radar.
EF1	NW of Redwater	Leake	MS	32.8523°N 89.6516°W	00:35–00:43	4.86 mi (7.82 km)	300 yd (270 m)	Numerous trees were snapped and uprooted.
EF2	W of Tylertown	Pike, Walthall	MS	31.1005°N 90.2688°W	01:12–01:21	4.41 mi (7.10 km)	150 yd (140 m)	A strong, multiple-vortex tornado caused major tree damage as it moved through heavily forested areas.
EF1	Mathiston	Choctaw, Webster	MS	33.5069°N 89.1165°W	02:08–02:15	2.66 mi (4.28 km)	400 yd (370 m)	A tornado touched down to the south of Mathison, where a small shed was damaged and numerous trees and tree limbs were snapped. One tree fell on and destroyed a truck. Additional tree limbs were snapped in Mathison before the tornado dissipated.
EF0	S of Mantee	Webster	MS	33.6543°N 89.0586°W	02:26–02:27	0.34 mi (0.55 km)	100 yd (91 m)	A weak, brief tornado uprooted several trees, with one falling on a shed. A utility pole was bent over as well.
EF1	SW of Taylorsville	Covington, Smith	MS	31.7685°N 89.506°W	02:39–02:46	4.1 mi (6.6 km)	250 yd (230 m)	One mobile home lost its skirting while a second had its porch covering and tin roof ripped off. Debris from the second home was tossed into a third mobile home, causing the door to fly open and resulting in one injury. A carport and some of the tin roof of one home was removed, while a metal shed had its roof ripped off too.
EF2	SE of Sturgis to SSW of Starkville	Winston, Oktibbeha	MS	33.2596°N 88.9459°W	02:55–03:10	8.81 mi (14.18 km)	830 yd (760 m)	A tornado snapped and uprooted numerous trees, with several falling on a house, truck, and camper. More were blown down on a horse barn, which was destroyed. At peak intensity, the tornado snapped almost a dozen power poles, caused significant tree damage, and completely destroyed a mobile home. Many houses sustained roof damage due to both wind and falling trees, and a church had moderate shingle damage.
EF1	Southeastern Starkville	Oktibbeha	MS	33.4105°N 88.7961°W	03:18–03:26	4.46 mi (7.18 km)	400 yd (370 m)	This tornado snapped and uprooted several trees throughout its path, including at the Mississippi State University campus. Several homes sustained roof and shingle damage, one of which had a tree fall on it.
EF2	SW of Hamilton to WSW of Greenwood Springs	Monroe	MS	33.7248°N 88.4409°W	04:06–04:23	11.3 mi (18.2 km)	800 yd (730 m)	1 death – This strong tornado rapidly developed and intensified before striking Hamilton at high-end EF2 strength, causing major damage to homes and other structures. Several frame homes were left with only interior rooms standing, and mobile homes were destroyed, along with a fire station building. A mechanic shop, apartment complex, self-storage building, local clinic, and the Monroe County Morgue were all damaged or destroyed. Power lines were downed, and outbuildings were destroyed as well. A tree fell on a mobile home outside of Hamilton, killing the occupant. Elsewhere, minor structural damage occurred, and trees were snapped or uprooted along the path. 19 people were injured.
EF2	SE of De Kalb	Kemper	MS	32.6688°N 88.5451°W	04:19–04:31	8.43 mi (13.57 km)	700 yd (640 m)	Numerous large trees were uprooted or snapped near their bases, some of which fell on hunting cabins and mobile homes, causing minor or moderate damage. A large outbuilding had its tin roof peeled off, with sheet metal strewn downwind and wrapped around trees.
EF2	W of Greenwood Springs to E of Smithville	Monroe	MS	33.8931°N 88.3215°W	04:22–04:39	13.2 mi (21.2 km)	800 yd (730 m)	This tornado tracked through wooded areas and downed numerous trees. A few homes sustained roof damage as well. In a later analysis, published in the Monthly Weather Review, it was noted “this tornado produced forest devastation and electrical infrastructure damage up to at least EF4 intensity”. Near the end of the report, it was stated that this was “a violent tornado, potentially even EF5 intensity.”
EF1	SE of Vossburg	Clarke	MS	31.848°N 88.8748°W	04:36–04:46	7.03 mi (11.31 km)	300 yd (270 m)	Several trees were snapped or uprooted. A private property suffered roof damage. Two metal high tension power line V-trusses were toppled. A chain link fence was downed as well.
EF1	W of De Soto	Clarke	MS	31.938°N 88.7868°W	04:48–04:52	4.57 mi (7.35 km)	200 yd (180 m)	A home sustained minor shingle damage and numerous trees were snapped or uprooted. One tree was blown over onto an old church building, causing the structure to collapse.
EF2	E of Quitman	Clarke	MS	32.0247°N 88.7102°W	04:55–05:12	6.09 mi (9.80 km)	400 yd (370 m)	A strong tornado completely mowed down dozens of trees in a heavily wooded area. Seven to nine power poles were broken as well.
EF1	SW of Shottsville	Marion	AL	34.2415°N 88.1425°W	04:57–04:59	1.21 mi (1.95 km)	440 yd (400 m)	Dozens of trees were uprooted, and the tin was partially torn off a small barn.

=== April 14 event ===
List of confirmed tornadoes – Sunday, April 14, 2019
EF#	Location	County / Parish	State	Start Coord.	Time (UTC)	Path length	Max width	Summary
EF1	NE of Red Bay	Franklin	AL	34.4617°N 88.0607°W	05:14–05:26	6.31 mi (10.15 km)	80 yd (73 m)	A barn and a wooden outbuilding were damaged, and a tree was blown over onto a house. Tin from a nearby outbuilding was scattered several hundred yards away. Throughout its path, this tornado snapped and uprooted numerous trees.
EF0	NE of Gallion	Hale	AL	32.5051°N 87.7038°W	06:26–06:35	8.72 mi (14.03 km)	220 yd (200 m)	A shed was destroyed. A trailer was knocked over at a church, significant portions of metal roofing were ripped from two more sheds and a barn, and numerous trees were snapped or uprooted. A home suffered minor damage to its shingles and overhangs as well.
EF1	WSW of Leighton	Colbert	AL	34.6738°N 87.6075°W	06:35–06:36	1.1 mi (1.8 km)	70 yd (64 m)	A tornado moved through the Aycock Heights subdivision, damaging roofs and destroying several unanchored outbuildings and sheds. The tornado damaged a billboard, inflicted minor roof damage on a home nearby, and flipped an RV on its side. Many trees were also uprooted or snapped.
EF1	NE of Low Gap to N of Hagler	Tuscaloosa	AL	33.0055°N 87.3586°W	07:20–07:25	3.51 mi (5.65 km)	475 yd (434 m)	This tornado touched down over inaccessible land just north of the Bibb County line. The roof was removed from a barn, shingles were peeled off a house, and another house also sustained roof damage. Many trees were either snapped or uprooted, with some blocking roads and one killing a cow.
EF1	N of Escatawpa	Jackson	MS	30.4754°N 88.5595°W	07:50–07:52	1.1 mi (1.8 km)	50 yd (46 m)	A high-end EF1 tornado caused extensive roof damage and shifted the wall of a house. At one house, a roof was lifted into the air then placed back on top of the house, causing roof and siding damage as well as blown out windows. Some tree damage also occurred.
EF0	ENE of Sprott	Perry	AL	32.6895°N 87.1621°W	08:21–08:31	6.67 mi (10.73 km)	400 yd (370 m)	A farm shed suffered minor structural damage. Several homes sustained damage to their roofs and siding, including one that saw two out of three of its support columns for the carport pulled out, resulting in partial roof failure. Trees were damaged.
EF0	Highland Lakes	Shelby	AL	33.3539°N 86.6857°W	09:05–09:14	6.48 mi (10.43 km)	600 yd (550 m)	Some homes sustained roof and gutter damage, fences and an outdoor grill were blown over, and a church sustained minor damage. Trees were snapped or uprooted, one of which landed on a vehicle.
EF0	W of Calera	Shelby	AL	33.1109°N 86.7851°W	09:14–09:19	2.97 mi (4.78 km)	125 yd (114 m)	One home had a portion of its wooden fence broken, with plywood, shingles, and tools lofted nearby. A second home suffered more severe damage, with the roof significantly damaged, including a small portion of the roof to an upstairs room that was ripped off. Numerous trees were snapped or uprooted, and additional fences were destroyed.
EF1	NNE of Glencoe	Etowah	AL	33.9768°N 85.9276°W	11:28–11:33	3.76 mi (6.05 km)	95 yd (87 m)	One home had minor trim damage, while a few others sustained considerable roof, window, and exterior wall damage, including one poorly anchored home that was shifted off of its foundation. A car was moved from it original location, and trees were downed. Some outbuildings were destroyed, and a dock on the Coosa River was damaged.
EF0	W of Henderson	Pike	AL	31.6594°N 86.1261°W	11:50–11:52	1 mi (1.6 km)	150 yd (140 m)	This tornado remained mainly over fields and farmland, though a few trees were uprooted.
EF0	W of Goshen	Crenshaw, Pike	AL	31.7073°N 86.1688°W	11:53–11:59	2.58 mi (4.15 km)	70 yd (64 m)	The roof was ripped off a chicken barn, a gas station canopy was damaged, and trees were uprooted.
EF1	Troy	Pike	AL	31.7949°N 85.9947°W	12:10–12:16	2.81 mi (4.52 km)	300 yd (270 m)	This tornado struck a mobile home park in town, moving about a dozen mobile homes off their foundations and rolling several others multiple times. Two cars were rolled at this location. Several businesses suffered damage, and large amounts of sheet metal was wrapped around power lines. Multiple homes had minor roof damage, and power poles and trees were snapped.
EF0	Phenix City, AL to Columbus, GA	Russell (AL), Muscogee (GA)	AL	32.432°N 84.9714°W	14:14–14:23	3.24 mi (5.21 km)	50 yd (46 m)	A tornado inflicted substantial roof damage to the Phenix City Water Treatment facility and uprooted or snapped several trees. It crossed the Chattahoochee River into Georgia and struck Columbus, where a gas station had its metal roof damaged and several gas pumps knocked out. Metal panels were pulled from a one-story metal warehouse building as well.
EF0	E of Midland	Muscogee, Harris, Talbot	GA	32.5795°N 84.7448°W	14:46–14:55	8.45 mi (13.60 km)	100 yd (91 m)	A home sustained minor shingle damage, two small trailers were rolled at a hunting camp, and dozens of trees were snapped or uprooted.
EF0	SW of Milner	Lamar	GA	33.0686°N 84.2245°W	15:39–15:42	1.13 mi (1.82 km)	75 yd (69 m)	Several trees were snapped or uprooted, and a few power lines were downed.
EF1	NNE of Milner	Lamar	GA	33.1380°N 84.1843°W	15:45–15:54	4.33 mi (6.97 km)	150 yd (140 m)	Numerous trees were snapped or uprooted. A house suffered minor shingle damage and its carport was damaged by a fallen tree. Utility poles were snapped as well.
EF0	E of Orchard Hill	Spalding	GA	33.1788°N 84.1541°W	15:52–15:54	1.01 mi (1.63 km)	150 yd (140 m)	A few trees were snapped or uprooted.
EF1	ENE of Autreyville	Colquitt	GA	31.07°N 83.7418°W	18:43–18:49	5.04 mi (8.11 km)	180 yd (160 m)	Three homes sustained major roof damage as a result of this high-end EF1 tornado. Debris was lofted into treetops, and numerous trees were snapped or uprooted.
EF0	Northwestern Springfield	Clark	OH	39.9602°N 83.8561°W	19:12–19:15	2.68 mi (4.31 km)	80 yd (73 m)	This tornado struck the northwestern edge of Springfield, where several mobile homes suffered roof and awning damage at a mobile home park. One mobile home had its roof torn off and thrown 150 yd (140 m), with insulation scattered into nearby treetops. Two semi-trailers were blown over at an industrial facility, and soccer nets were blown over at a soccer field. Trees and fences were downed as well.
EF2	SW of Shelby to N of Olivesburg	Richland	OH	40.8388°N 82.6943°W	20:42–21:00	17.0 mi (27.4 km)	880 yd (800 m)	A strong tornado impacted the southern fringes of Shelby, where a Chevrolet dealership sustained roof loss and collapse of multiple cinder block exterior walls. Vehicles were damaged in the parking lot, and metal light poles were bent to the ground. A nearby warehouse building had metal roofing peeled off as well. Homes along the path sustained partial to total roof loss, one of which sustained some collapse of exterior walls. Barns were destroyed, and trees and power poles were snapped. 6 people were injured.
EF0	SE of Canal Fulton	Stark, Summit	OH	40.88°N 81.57°W	21:15-21:18	3.6 mi (5.8 km)	50 yd (46 m)	A small outbuilding was largely destroyed and treetops were damaged.
EF0	W of Dover	Tuscarawas	OH	40.504°N 81.551°W	21:49-21:50	0.5 mi (0.80 km)	75 yd (69 m)	A 100-year-old barn was blown apart, with several items inside displaced. Several large branches were downed.
EF0	Springboro	Crawford	PA	41.798°N 80.3734°W	22:48-22:49	0.4 mi (0.64 km)	100 yd (91 m)	Several homes in town were damaged by tornadic winds or fallen trees. Telephone poles and street signs were snapped or bent as well.
EF0	SE of Cooperstown	Venango	PA	41.471°N 79.829°W	23:43–23:45	1.2 mi (1.9 km)	100 yd (91 m)	Several tree limbs were snapped.
EF0	NE of Cherrytree	Venango	PA	41.545°N 79.687°W	23:53–23:55	1 mi (1.6 km)	75 yd (69 m)	Several tree limbs were snapped.
EF2	Starbrick to N of Scandia	Warren	PA	41.7897°N 79.2857°W	00:20–00:40	18 mi (29 km)	400 yd (370 m)	A high-end EF2 tornado caused significant damage in Starbrick, where large metal buildings were completely destroyed at a lumber company. Several other buildings sustained extensive damage, and a boat was lifted off the ground. The tornado then struck North Warren, where multiple homes were damaged, and trees were downed. A communications tower was toppled to the ground in the Scandia area before the tornado dissipated.
EF1	SW of Cedar Mountain	Greenville	SC	35.066°N 82.718°W	00:51-00:55	1.63 mi (2.62 km)	200 yd (180 m)	Hundreds of trees were snapped or uprooted. This is the first tornado in the Greenville County mountains since official recordkeeping began in 1950.
EF1	SE of Bowersville	Hart	GA	34.327°N 83.04°W	00:53–00:58	2.88 mi (4.63 km)	100 yd (91 m)	Two large metal barns sustained significant roof or wall damage. One home had a small cinderblock wall collapsed while a second suffered damage to a single wall. A metal road sign was snapped at its base, free-standing carports were lofted, and the roof rack of an SUV was detached and thrown several hundred feet. Numerous trees were snapped or uprooted, one of which fell on a home.
EF1	Simpsonville	Greenville	SC	34.71°N 82.293°W	02:03–02:13	6.9 mi (11.1 km)	100 yd (91 m)	Numerous homes suffered minor to moderate roof and shingle damage. Dozens of large trees were snapped or uprooted, including some that fell on homes. A trampoline was lifted hundreds of feet into the air, and a garage was collapsed on to three vehicles inside.
EF1	Buffalo Valley	Union	PA	40.9579°N 76.9708°W	04:35-04:37	1.45 mi (2.33 km)	150 yd (140 m)	Several barns had their roofs taken off, and one barn was destroyed. Some homes sustained minor damage and many trees were uprooted or snapped.

=== April 15 event ===
List of confirmed tornadoes – Monday, April 15, 2019
EF#	Location	County / Parish	State	Start Coord.	Time (UTC)	Path length	Max width	Summary
EF2	Benton	Columbia	PA	41.1887°N 76.4065°W	05:00–05:08	3.69 mi (5.94 km)	300 yd (270 m)	A strong tornado caused considerable damage in Benton, where approximately 50 homes and businesses were damaged, including one well-constructed home that had its roof torn off. Nine trailers sustained significant damage as well. Two people were injured.
EF1	Dushore	Sullivan	PA	41.4716°N 76.5824°W	05:05–05:13	10.43 mi (16.79 km)	350 yd (320 m)	This tornado touched down near Worlds End State Park, where it snapped or uprooted numerous trees. A barn was destroyed at a farm as well. It then moved directly into Dushore, where 7 to 8 homes and a church steeple were moderately damaged.
EF1	Port Crane	Broome	NY	42.2031°N 75.7473°W	05:32-05:35	2.15 mi (3.46 km)	175 yd (160 m)	Houses and outbuildings sustained minor damage.
EF0	Scranton	Lackawanna	PA	41.3899°N 75.6593°W	05:45–05:49	3.22 mi (5.18 km)	100 yd (91 m)	Trees and wires were downed, some of which landed on buildings. Residences sustained roof damage, and a small structure was overturned.
EF1	Harford Township	Susquehanna	PA	41.7474°N 75.6674°W	05:50–05:52	2.35 mi (3.78 km)	150 yd (140 m)	A silo was damaged, and a barn was destroyed. Trees and power lines were downed as well.
EF0	N of Glenview	Halifax	NC	36.229°N 77.8557°W	06:16–06:18	0.98 mi (1.58 km)	50 yd (46 m)	A building had a part of its tin roof peeled back and a grain bin was damaged. One double-wide manufactured home suffered major damage to its roof and partial damage to a couple of its exterior walls, while a second sustained minor roof damage. Several trees were severely damaged as well.
EF0	W of Heathsville	Northumberland	VA	37.9008°N 76.5189°W	06:29–06:31	1.3 mi (2.1 km)	50 yd (46 m)	This tornado caused roof damage to a few buildings along with minor tree damage.
EF0	SE of Federalsburg	Dorchester	MD	38.65°N 75.76°W	07:31-07:32	0.5 mi (0.80 km)	100 yd (91 m)	A brief tornado damaged or destroyed small sheds, tipped over an empty trailer, and snapped or downed some trees.
EF2	NW of Laurel to SE of Seaford	Sussex	DE	38.57°N 75.59°W	07:38–07:45	6.2 mi (10.0 km)	400 yd (370 m)	Numerous homes were damaged along the path, some of which had roofs or exterior walls ripped off. Barns, garages, and irrigation systems were destroyed, and many trees were snapped or uprooted. Power poles were snapped, and an Utz Quality Foods warehouse was badly damaged. One person was injured.
EF1	Harbeson to Broadkill Beach	Sussex	DE	38.7400°N 75.2788°W	08:00–08:07	6.2 mi (10.0 km)	50 yd (46 m)	A few trees were snapped, the roof of a barn was removed, and some other structures suffered some roof damage as well.

=== April 16 event ===
List of confirmed tornadoes – Tuesday, April 16, 2019
EF#	Location	County / Parish	State	Start Coord.	Time (UTC)	Path length	Max width
EF0	S of Ridgecrest	Kern, San Bernardino	CA	35.6129°N 117.6405°W	23:00-23:10	1.59 mi (2.56 km)	50 yd (46 m)
EF0	A weak landspout crossed through a scrapyard, causing minor damage.						

=== April 17 event ===
List of confirmed tornadoes – Wednesday, April 17, 2019
EF#	Location	County / Parish	State	Start Coord.	Time (UTC)	Path length	Max width	Summary
EFU	SW of Glazier to NNE of Canadian	Hemphill	TX	35.966°N 100.2968°W	20:39–20:54	2.43 mi (3.91 km)	30 yd (27 m)	There were multiple reports of a tornado touchdown. No damage occurred.
EF0	NE of Glazier	Hemphill, Lipscomb	TX	36.0342°N 100.2277°W	20:54–21:21	4.13 mi (6.65 km)	40 yd (37 m)	A rope tornado snapped some tree limbs.
EFU	SW of Higgins	Lipscomb	TX	36.0659°N 100.0741°W	21:29–21:32	1.06 mi (1.71 km)	30 yd (27 m)	Broadcast media and storm spotters reported touchdown near Higgins. No damage occurred.
EF1	NW of Shattuck	Ellis	OK	36.314°N 99.942°W	21:47–21:53	1.6 mi (2.6 km)	50 yd (46 m)	Sheds, trees, and fences were damaged at two homes northwest of Shattuck.
EF0	N of Shattuck	Ellis	OK	36.37°N 99.9°W	21:49–22:03	1.31 mi (2.11 km)	10 yd (9.1 m)	This tornado was the second ongoing in Ellis County. Only minor tree damage occurred.
EFU	NE of Washburn	Carson	TX	35.2471°N 101.4959°W	22:05–22:19	1.97 mi (3.17 km)	20 yd (18 m)	A landspout was reported by broadcast media and Rick Husband International Airport. No damage occurred.
EFU	NW of Wellington	Sumner	KS	37.32°N 97.46°W	23:38–23:42	1.11 mi (1.79 km)	30 yd (27 m)	A weak landspout tornado remained over open country, causing no damage.
EFU	N of Eureka	Greenwood	KS	37.93°N 96.28°W	00:50-00:51	0.1 mi (0.16 km)	30 yd (27 m)	A brief landspout tornado remained over open country, causing no damage.
EF0	W of Lockwood	Dade	MO	37.3766°N 94.0208°W	05:50–05:52	1.97 mi (3.17 km)	50 yd (46 m)	Trees, outbuildings, and an irrigation system were damaged.

=== April 18 event ===
List of confirmed tornadoes – Thursday, April 18, 2019
EF#	Location	County / Parish	State	Start Coord.	Time (UTC)	Path length	Max width	Summary
EF0	N of Greenfield	Dade	MO	37.4378°N 93.8466°W	06:00–06:01	1.04 mi (1.67 km)	200 yd (180 m)	Trees and outdoor objects were damaged.
EF1	NNW of Fayette to SSE of Port Gibson	Jefferson, Claiborne	MS	31.8086°N 91.1004°W	18:13–18:25	8.44 mi (13.58 km)	1,100 yd (1,000 m)	Embedded within a larger area of straight-line winds, this tornado downed hundreds of trees and caused minor roof damage to several homes.
EF1	SE of Utica	Copiah	MS	31.9864°N 90.6119°W	18:58–19:09	6.57 mi (10.57 km)	500 yd (460 m)	Numerous trees were snapped or uprooted.
EF2	NW of Utica to ENE of Learned	Hinds	MS	32.1237°N 90.6506°W	18:59–19:13	11.03 mi (17.75 km)	1,320 yd (1,210 m)	At its peak intensity, this large tornado snapped or uprooted a large swath of trees. Elsewhere, some homes sustained minor roof damage or were impacted by falling trees.
EF2	SW of Learned to ESE of Raymond	Hinds	MS	32.1769°N 90.6036°W	19:06–19:27	12.77 mi (20.55 km)	1,320 yd (1,210 m)	This large tornado snapped and uprooted countless trees along its path, and snapped several utility poles as well.
EF0	ESE of Bogue Chitto	Lincoln	MS	31.3914°N 90.3756°W	19:35–19:36	0.64 mi (1.03 km)	200 yd (180 m)	Several trees were damaged, including one that fell on a barn.
EF1	NNW of Georgetown to NNW of Puckett	Copiah, Simpson, Rankin	MS	31.8964°N 90.178°W	19:35–20:10	28.36 mi (45.64 km)	600 yd (550 m)	A long-tracked tornado significantly damaged a mobile home, leaving one partial interior wall and the floor. A second mobile home had its rear exterior wall ripped out. Numerous trees were snapped and uprooted, some of which fell on homes and vehicles. A large metal building was completely destroyed, a couple of barns and sheds lost portions of their roofs, and a couple of power poles were uprooted, with power lines downed.
EF1	ESE of Clinton to W of Jackson	Hinds	MS	32.3266°N 90.3067°W	19:41–19:46	2.32 mi (3.73 km)	150 yd (140 m)	At the Clinton Walmart, the garden center and a fence were damaged, and two vehicles were blown over. Trees were downed around apartment complexes to the east before the tornado lifted.
EF1	NW of Pearl to N of Flowood	Rankin	MS	32.2973°N 90.1294°W	19:51–19:56	3.13 mi (5.04 km)	50 yd (46 m)	Many trees were either snapped or uprooted, and large tree limbs were snapped off.
EF1	E of Braxton	Simpson, Rankin	MS	31.9989°N 89.9468°W	19:54–20:03	11.31 mi (18.20 km)	400 yd (370 m)	Numerous trees were snapped and uprooted.
EF2	W of Puckett	Simpson, Rankin	MS	32.0357°N 89.8333°W	20:01–20:11	9.38 mi (15.10 km)	600 yd (550 m)	This large multiple-vortex tornado downed massive swaths of trees along its path, as well as some power poles and lines. At a few points, there were varying degrees of intensity within the tornado itself, indicating multiple vortices were present inside it.
EF1	NE of Flowood	Rankin	MS	32.3625°N 90.0644°W	20:07–20:10	1.12 mi (1.80 km)	50 yd (46 m)	Many trees were either snapped or uprooted, and large tree limbs were snapped off. Power lines were downed as well.
EF1	NW of Puckett to WSW of Polkville	Rankin	MS	32.1642°N 89.8086°W	20:13–20:18	4.49 mi (7.23 km)	1,100 yd (1,000 m)	Numerous trees and power lines were downed by this large tornado. Several chicken houses and a barn were heavily damaged.
EF0	E of Madison	Rankin	MS	32.4341°N 90.0004°W	20:15–20:18	1.6 mi (2.6 km)	540 yd (490 m)	Trees were snapped and uprooted.
EF1	Polkville	Smith	MS	32.1865°N 89.7211°W	20:19–20:24	3.47 mi (5.58 km)	950 yd (870 m)	Hundreds of trees and many power lines were downed. Multiple homes suffered either minor damage from tornadic winds or more substantial damage from fallen trees.
EF0	N of Polkville	Smith, Scott	MS	32.2060°N 89.7122°W	20:20–20:23	2.38 mi (3.83 km)	50 yd (46 m)	This weak tornado moved northeast, snapping small trees and branches.
EF1	E of Madison	Rankin	MS	32.4542°N 89.9442°W	20:22–20:29	4.83 mi (7.77 km)	150 yd (140 m)	A tornado occurred in a heavily forested area, snapping and uprooting trees.
EF1	N of Polkville to S of Morton	Scott	MS	32.2763°N 89.7015°W	20:24–20:26	2.57 mi (4.14 km)	150 yd (140 m)	Numerous hardwood trees were either snapped or uprooted, and power lines and poles were knocked down.
EF1	SE of Morton	Scott	MS	32.2871°N 89.5893°W	20:24–20:26	1.41 mi (2.27 km)	200 yd (180 m)	Several trees were uprooted and a few were snapped.
EF2	Morton to WNW of Forest	Scott	MS	32.3556°N 89.6523°W	20:31–20:43	6.02 mi (9.69 km)	560 yd (510 m)	A high-end EF2 tornado touched down in Morton, where numerous large trees were snapped or uprooted and multiple homes had their roofs torn off. One home sustained collapse of several exterior walls, and several others sustained minor to moderate roof damage. Trees and tree limbs were downed farther along the path before the tornado dissipated.
EF1	N of Ludlow	Scott, Leake	MS	32.5883°N 89.779°W	20:40–20:59	11.35 mi (18.27 km)	1,320 yd (1,210 m)	Numerous trees were snapped and uprooted by this large tornado.
EF1	S of Lena	Scott	MS	32.5708°N 89.7491°W	20:42–20:59	10.3 mi (16.6 km)	900 yd (820 m)	Several mobile homes suffered minor roof damage. A gas station had a large section of its roof removed. Sheet metal was peeled back on several barns and chicken houses. Numerous trees were snapped and uprooted.
EF1	NW of Harperville	Scott, Leake	MS	32.504°N 89.5856°W	20:45–21:05	11.04 mi (17.77 km)	1,760 yd (1,610 m)	A very large but weak tornado peeled off tin metal from a barn and old chicken houses, and it also snapped and uprooted numerous trees. One home suffered minor damage from a fallen tree limb.
EF1	N of Lena	Leake	MS	32.621°N 89.7297°W	20:46–21:00	10.34 mi (16.64 km)	1,000 yd (910 m)	Numerous trees were snapped and uprooted, some of which fell on a power pole and caused minor roof damage to a house.
EF1	N of Standing Pine	Leake, Neshoba	MS	32.6963°N 89.4811°W	21:04–21:15	9.9 mi (15.9 km)	1,600 yd (1,500 m)	Widespread tree damage occurred as a result of this large tornado.
EF1	NE of Standing Pine	Leake	MS	32.704°N 89.3982°W	21:19–21:21	2.1 mi (3.4 km)	300 yd (270 m)	Many trees were snapped and uprooted, a few sheds and barns suffered minor damage, and several power lines and power poles were downed.
EF1	ENE of Standing Pine to SSW of Pearl River	Leake, Neshoba	MS	32.7014°N 89.3675°W	21:20–21:25	5.96 mi (9.59 km)	350 yd (320 m)	Many trees were snapped and uprooted, and some power lines were downed.
EF1	WSW of Pearl River	Leake, Neshoba	MS	32.757°N 89.3222°W	21:22–21:24	0.6 mi (0.97 km)	75 yd (69 m)	Numerous trees were snapped and uprooted.
EF1	E of Tucker	Neshoba	MS	32.6641°N 88.9835°W	21:23–21:35	8.82 mi (14.19 km)	1,400 yd (1,300 m)	Portions of tin roofing was peeled from two barns as a result of this large tornado. Numerous trees were snapped or uprooted.
EF1	SW of Pearl River	Leake, Neshoba	MS	32.7157°N 89.3235°W	21:25–21:27	1.71 mi (2.75 km)	180 yd (160 m)	Numerous trees were snapped and uprooted.
EF1	S of Pearl River	Neshoba	MS	32.7618°N 89.2596°W	21:30–21:32	1.95 mi (3.14 km)	250 yd (230 m)	One home sustained moderate shingle and roof damage. Otherwise, trees were snapped.
EF0	N of Pearl River	Neshoba	MS	32.8401°N 89.2335°W	21:34–21:49	11.22 mi (18.06 km)	1,000 yd (910 m)	A wide swath of trees were damaged.
EF0	SW of De Kalb	Kemper	MS	32.7156°N 88.6833°W	21:37–21:43	3.34 mi (5.38 km)	300 yd (270 m)	The aluminum roofing to a one-story home was peeled back and thrown several hundred yards into a field. Numerous trees were snapped or uprooted.
EF1	Philadelphia	Neshoba	MS	32.759°N 89.1158°W	21:40–21:44	1.91 mi (3.07 km)	880 yd (800 m)	Numerous trees were snapped or uprooted, some of which fell on homes and caused structural damage. A church and a nearby building sustained roof damage, and an exterior wall was collapsed outward at an urgent care.
EF1	Southeastern Philadelphia	Neshoba	MS	32.7459°N 89.1068°W	21:40–21:46	3.15 mi (5.07 km)	700 yd (640 m)	Numerous trees were snapped or uprooted, some of which fell on homes.
EF1	SSE of Noxapater	Winston	MS	32.9348°N 89.0548°W	21:50–21:51	1.34 mi (2.16 km)	100 yd (91 m)	Numerous trees were snapped or uprooted.
EF1	E of Noxapater	Winston	MS	32.9826°N 89.0396°W	21:54–22:05	9.89 mi (15.92 km)	1,000 yd (910 m)	Numerous trees were snapped or uprooted.
EF0	E of Noxapater	Winston	MS	32.9936°N 88.9936°W	21:57–22:06	6.23 mi (10.03 km)	800 yd (730 m)	Numerous trees were snapped or uprooted.
EF1	E of Noxapater	Winston	MS	32.9486°N 88.8694°W	22:04–22:07	2.97 mi (4.78 km)	100 yd (91 m)	Numerous trees were snapped or uprooted.
EF0	ESE of Louisville	Winston	MS	33.0692°N 88.8821°W	22:08–22:09	1.36 mi (2.19 km)	50 yd (46 m)	Several trees were uprooted.
EF1	ESE of Louisville	Winston, Noxubee	MS	33.0524°N 88.8155°W	22:13–22:21	7 mi (11 km)	700 yd (640 m)	Several trees were uprooted.
EF1	E of Brooksville	Noxubee	MS	33.2039°N 88.4856°W	22:29–22:32	2.03 mi (3.27 km)	500 yd (460 m)	The tin roof of a church was partially removed, an irrigation pivot was partially flipped, multiple homes suffered roof damage, and trees were damaged too.
EF1	Brooksville	Noxubee	MS	33.2383°N 88.5839°W	22:38–22:49	9.63 mi (15.50 km)	600 yd (550 m)	A high-end EF1 tornado struck Brooksville, producing considerable damage to structures at its peak. Other homes suffered more minor roof damage. Several utility poles were downed and trees were damaged.
EF1	ENE of Crawford	Lowndes	MS	33.3167°N 88.5026°W	22:42–22:47	3.12 mi (5.02 km)	150 yd (140 m)	A large empty grain bin was slid off its base and bent inward, the roof of a large metal building was partially removed, and a few trees were uprooted.

=== April 19 event ===
List of confirmed tornadoes – Friday, April 19, 2019
EF#	Location	County / Parish	State	Start Coord.	Time (UTC)	Path length	Max width	Summary
EF0	SW of Johns Creek	Fulton	GA	34.0078°N 84.2014°W	09:07–09:08	0.57 mi (0.92 km)	150 yd (140 m)	Trees and tree limbs were snapped, and several power poles were downed.
EF1	S of Clermont	Hall	GA	34.4099°N 83.7783°W	09:50–09:53	2.36 mi (3.80 km)	300 yd (270 m)	Trees were snapped and uprooted while a steeple at a church was blown over.
EF0	S of Telogia to S of Quincy	Liberty, Wakulla, Leon	FL	30.1053°N 84.7368°W	12:26–12:44	18.12 mi (29.16 km)	150 yd (140 m)	A weak tornado began in the Apalachicola National Forest and moved northeast, causing solely tree damage.
EF3	N of Oak Level to E of Henry Fork	Franklin	VA	36.8564°N 79.8906°W	14:25–14:37	8.11 mi (13.05 km)	250 yd (230 m)	This intense tornado caused significant damage to the south of Rocky Mount. A well-built brick home sustained total loss of its roof and exterior walls. A modular home was left with only a few walls standing, and 10 outbuildings were damaged or destroyed. Vehicles and large metal storage tanks were thrown considerable distances. Numerous trees were snapped or uprooted, and metal light poles were bent to the ground at a baseball field in the Sontag community. Two people were injured.
EF0	Ashford	McDowell	NC	35.88°N 81.94°W	14:27–14:28	0.43 mi (0.69 km)	50 yd (46 m)	An inn lost some shingles, a mobile home had its metal skirting damaged, and some small outbuildings were damaged in the small community of Ashford. Some trees were also uprooted.
EF1	N of Thaxton	Bedford	VA	37.3858°N 79.6085°W	15:22–15:25	2.22 mi (3.57 km)	60 yd (55 m)	An outbuilding was destroyed and trees were snapped or uprooted.
EF1	N of McRae	Laurens	GA	32.2167°N 82.9119°W	15:25–15:30	4.45 mi (7.16 km)	200 yd (180 m)	A metal roof at a one-story home was partially lifted and thrown. The majority of damage was snapped or uprooted trees, some of which took down power lines.
EF0	NNW of Kings Ferry, FL	Camden	GA	30.8371°N 81.8934°W	16:05–16:06	0.43 mi (0.69 km)	10 yd (9.1 m)	Several pine trees were snapped by this brief tornado.
EF2	S of Rowesville	Orangeburg	SC	33.2693°N 80.8933°W	17:48–17:56	10.6 mi (17.1 km)	300 yd (270 m)	A strong tornado snapped or uprooted a large number of trees, some of which fell on homes, vehicles, and sheds. A metal shed was completely destroyed, with its debris spread over a 100 yd (91 m) area.
EF1	E of Orangeburg	Orangeburg, Calhoun	SC	33.4939°N 80.7892°W	18:01–18:09	7.82 mi (12.59 km)	400 yd (370 m)	Numerous trees were snapped and uprooted, and two mobile homes were destroyed by fallen trees. A cinder block garage had its walls collapsed and metal roof thrown across a road. A center pivot irrigation system was overturned.
EF1	S of Whitmire	Newberry	SC	34.4278°N 81.6193°W	18:07–18:09	1.89 mi (3.04 km)	200 yd (180 m)	A large two-story chicken house was completely destroyed, a small outbuilding suffered damage to its metal roof and siding, and a small shed was moved 2 ft (0.61 m) off its foundation. The underpinning of a mobile home was damaged. Numerous trees were snapped or uprooted as well.
EF0	NNE of Newberry	Newberry	SC	34.3812°N 81.5456°W	18:08–18:09	0.33 mi (0.53 km)	25 yd (23 m)	Several trees were snapped.
EF2	SE of Summerton	Clarendon	SC	33.5238°N 80.2198°W	18:29–18:33	2.91 mi (4.68 km)	250 yd (230 m)	At a campsite, two docks, a cabin, and multiple trees were damaged. Some of those trees fell on homes, vehicles, and boats. The strong tornado continued northeast, completely destroying one mobile home and significantly damaging others. Additional houses suffered minor damage before the tornado lifted.
EF0	SW of Salters	Williamsburg	SC	33.59°N 79.9°W	19:00–19:01	0.25 mi (0.40 km)	15 yd (14 m)	Small tree limbs and other debris were blown around.
EF0	W of Olanta	Florence	SC	33.9314°N 79.9557°W	19:00–19:02	0.55 mi (0.89 km)	30 yd (27 m)	A home sustained minor damage, a large roof was lifted off an outbuilding and shed, and several trees were uprooted.
EF1	Robbins	Moore	NC	35.4679°N 79.6342°W	19:11–19:14	1.6 mi (2.6 km)	300 yd (270 m)	Numerous trees were snapped and uprooted in Robbins, and several homes suffered roof damage from fallen trees.
EF0	Lincolnton	Gaston, Lincoln	NC	35.399°N 81.282°W	19:29–19:39	7.11 mi (11.44 km)	100 yd (91 m)	Trees were snapped or uprooted in and around Lincolnton. One tree fell on a home, injuring the occupant.
EF1	Siler City	Chatham	NC	35.7420°N 79.4912°W	19:35–19:38	1.92 mi (3.09 km)	150 yd (140 m)	Numerous trees were snapped and uprooted. Power poles and power lines were downed, and the roofs of several homes in town were damaged.
EF2	W of Chapel Hill to Southern Hillsborough	Orange	NC	35.9187°N 79.188°W	20:00–20:15	10.1 mi (16.3 km)	600 yd (550 m)	A strong tornado snapped and split large, healthy trees along its path. Some of these trees landed on homes and vehicles. Several homes in the southern part of Hillsborough received considerable damage, including one home that had its roof and several of its exterior walls completely destroyed.
EF0	N of Hiddenite	Alexander	NC	35.949°N 81.059°W	20:10–20:11	0.53 mi (0.85 km)	75 yd (69 m)	Part of a metal roof was ripped off a barn and lofted some distance. Trees were damaged too.
EF1	Spivey's Corner to S of Four Oaks	Sampson, Johnston	NC	35.1913°N 78.5071°W	21:01–21:11	10.15 mi (16.33 km)	125 yd (114 m)	Power poles and power lines were downed, outdoor furniture was tossed, and at least one home suffered minor damage to its roof in Sampson County. The tornado remained on the ground intermittently into Johnston County, where it caused considerable roof and window damage to two homes and blew over several grain silos. Numerous trees were snapped and uprooted along the entirety of the path.
EF1	Shipman	Nelson	VA	37.699°N 78.789°W	21:31–21:33	1.52 mi (2.45 km)	125 yd (114 m)	Numerous trees were snapped or uprooted, one of which fell and killed a horse, and a second of which damaged three vehicles. A recreational vehicle was blown over, several small outbuildings and sheds were destroyed, and power lines were severed.
EF1	E of Dortches to WSW of Enfield	Nash, Halifax	NC	36.003°N 77.8058°W	22:08–22:19	11.74 mi (18.89 km)	350 yd (320 m)	This tornado damaged several outbuildings and ripped off a considerable amount of roofing from one home. It also snapped and uprooted many trees.
EF1	S of Whitakers to E of Enfield	Edgecombe, Halifax	NC	36.0435°N 77.7097°W	22:16–22:25	10.6 mi (17.1 km)	75 yd (69 m)	This tornado completely destroyed a single-wide mobile home, lofting its remnants for hundreds of yards down the tornado's path. Several other mobile homes nearby only sustained minor damage. Some farm outbuildings were also damaged, but otherwise this tornado mostly snapped and uprooted trees.
EF1	South Weldon, NC to E of Emporia, VA	Halifax (NC), Northampton (NC), Greensville (VA), Southampton (VA)	NC, VA	36.3707°N 77.6371°W	22:34–00:00	24.55 mi (39.51 km)	100 yd (91 m)	Several structures in South Weldon sustained minor damage to their roofs and siding as a result of this long-tracked tornado. Many trees were snapped and uprooted along the remainder of the tornado's path.
EF0	W of Gaston	Northampton	NC	36.49°N 77.72°W	22:39–22:40	1.5 mi (2.4 km)	50 yd (46 m)	Trees were snapped and uprooted.
EF0	N of Jackson	Northampton	NC	36.4°N 77.43°W	22:44–22:54	9.75 mi (15.69 km)	100 yd (91 m)	Trees were snapped and uprooted along the path.
EF0	E of Skippers	Greensville	VA	36.55°N 77.46°W	22:48–22:54	6.35 mi (10.22 km)	50 yd (46 m)	Trees were snapped along the path.
EF0	NE of Brodnax	Brunswick	VA	36.7367°N 77.9989°W	22:50–22:51	0.6 mi (0.97 km)	200 yd (180 m)	This tornado uprooted or snapped trees along its path. One tree fell on a horse, killing it.
EF0	Emporia	Greensville	VA	36.65°N 77.58°W	22:56–23:01	4.4 mi (7.1 km)	100 yd (91 m)	A couple of outbuildings were damaged, and trees were snapped. A shopping center in town sustained minor damage.
EF1	Knobsville	Fulton	PA	40.0059°N 77.9857°W	23:06–23:08	1.5 mi (2.4 km)	75 yd (69 m)	Trees were snapped and uprooted, and a home lost both its chimney and a porch roof.
EF2	St. Thomas	Franklin	PA	39.9039°N 77.8474°W	23:10–23:12	2.89 mi (4.65 km)	75 yd (69 m)	Commercial buildings suffered significant damage, several power poles were snapped, and numerous trees were snapped or uprooted. Several residential homes and garages were damaged as well.
EF0	E of Stony Creek to E of Disputanta	Sussex, Prince George	VA	36.91°N 77.34°W	23:18–23:30	17.7 mi (28.5 km)	100 yd (91 m)	Trees were snapped and uprooted, with one falling on a garage and destroying it.
EF1	Richvale	Huntingdon	PA	40.2532°N 77.8103°W	23:28–23:35	5.37 mi (8.64 km)	350 yd (320 m)	Sporadic damage to barns and the roofs of homes occurred. One barn was completely destroyed at high-end EF1 intensity. Trees were snapped or uprooted as well.
EF1	Disputanta	Prince George	VA	37.11°N 77.2°W	23:31–23:41	8.3 mi (13.4 km)	200 yd (180 m)	Numerous sheds and outbuildings were significantly damaged or destroyed. Many trees were snapped or uprooted, and a carport was blown over.
EF1	Krause	Juniata	PA	40.383°N 77.7255°W	23:39–23:41	1.25 mi (2.01 km)	350 yd (320 m)	The roof of one home and one barn sustained damage. Numerous trees were snapped and uprooted.
EF2	NE of Charles City	Charles City	VA	37.36°N 77.05°W	23:46–23:52	3.1 mi (5.0 km)	200 yd (180 m)	The roof of a rod and gun club was lifted and partially blown off, with the south-facing exterior wall blown in. Extensive tree damage was observed, with numerous trees snapped or uprooted.
EF0	NW of Smithfield	Isle of Wight	VA	36.99°N 76.66°W	23:56–23:58	2.9 mi (4.7 km)	100 yd (91 m)	Numerous trees were snapped or uprooted, one of which fell on a house.
EF2	Lewistown	Mifflin	PA	40.5313°N 77.6139°W	23:57–00:05	4.9 mi (7.9 km)	200 yd (180 m)	Several hundred trees were snapped or uprooted, with several trailers were destroyed by fallen trees. Another trailer was flipped, and the roof of a fire station in Lewistown was partially removed.
EF0	NE of Williamsburg	York	VA	37.28°N 76.67°W	00:05–00:06	1.8 mi (2.9 km)	150 yd (140 m)	Trees, power lines, and some homes were damaged.
EF2	ENE of Mineral	Louisa	VA	37.99°N 77.82°W	00:06–00:08	2 mi (3.2 km)	300 yd (270 m)	This tornado removed the roof of a two-story home, and snapped numerous trees on the property. Another home's garage also sustained damage, and a tree was blown over onto a car.
EF0	Newport News	Newport News (C)	VA	37.10°N 76.55°W	00:07–00:08	1.8 mi (2.9 km)	100 yd (91 m)	This tornado likely began as a waterspout over the Warwick River. Upon moving ashore, it produced mainly tree damage, though it did also destroy a small storage shed.
EF0	Maryus	Gloucester	VA	37.26°N 76.41°W	00:20–00:22	1.4 mi (2.3 km)	100 yd (91 m)	This tornado likely began as a waterspout over the York River. It moved ashore, flattening a shed and damaging trees.
EF0	Reston	Fairfax	VA	38.9302°N 77.3783°W	00:55–01:00	4.12 mi (6.63 km)	100 yd (91 m)	Trees were snapped or uprooted, some fencing was blown over, and shingles were blown off several townhouses in Reston. An outdoor shed was destroyed. Fallen trees caused significant damage to one townhouse, one home, and the front end of an unoccupied vehicle.

=== April 22 event ===
List of confirmed tornadoes – Monday, April 22, 2019
EF#	Location	County / Parish	State	Start Coord.	Time (UTC)	Path length	Max width
EFU	NW of Campo	San Diego	CA	32.6965°N 116.5286°W	23:00	0.31 mi (0.50 km)	50 yd (46 m)
EFU	A waterspout was well-photographed over Lake Morena.						
EF0	N of Clint	El Paso	TX	31.5883°N 106.2286°W	23:26–23:28	0.1 mi (0.16 km)	20 yd (18 m)
EF0	A weak landspout tornado was photographed.						
EFU	SW of Royston	Fisher	TX	32.79°N 100.33°W	00:17–00:18	0.08 mi (0.13 km)	40 yd (37 m)
EFU	A trained storm spotter reported a brief landspout tornado.						
EFU	S of Aspermont	Stonewall	TX	33.0561°N 100.2176°W	00:59–01:04	0.86 mi (1.38 km)	30 yd (27 m)
EFU	Motorists photographed a tornado.						

=== April 24 event ===
List of confirmed tornadoes – Wednesday, April 24, 2019
EF#	Location	County / Parish	State	Start Coord.	Time (UTC)	Path length	Max width
EF0	SE of Pulaski	Pulaski	IL	37.202°N 89.198°W	20:59–21:00	0.23 mi (0.37 km)	30 yd (27 m)
EF0	A couple of large trees were downed by this brief tornado.						
EF2	Northeastern Bryan	Brazos	TX	30.6867°N 96.3014°W	21:48–21:52	1.74 mi (2.80 km)	100 yd (91 m)
EF2	A strong tornado impacted the northeastern edge of Bryan, where a house was heavily damaged, and several metal warehouse buildings were severely damaged or destroyed. Outbuildings were damaged, and trees were snapped as well. One man was injured in one of the warehouses.						
EF2	San Augustine	San Augustine	TX	31.5181°N 94.1543°W	04:13–04:23	8.52 mi (13.71 km)	1,100 yd (1,000 m)
EF2	A large, high-end EF2 tornado moved through San Augustine, where 54 residences were damaged. The awning of a gas station was ripped off, the electrical transmission tower of a sub-station was knocked over, and a laundromat and several additional structures were severely damaged. One small business was leveled, and trees were snapped and uprooted along the tornado's path.						
EF1	S of Huxley, TX to NNE of Pleasant Hill, LA	Shelby (TX), Sabine (LA), DeSoto (LA)	TX, LA	31.6723°N 93.8901°W	04:42–05:28	32.1 mi (51.7 km)	900 yd (820 m)
EF1	A long-tracked tornado snapped or uprooted numerous trees. One tree fell on a vehicle, injuring the driver. Five homes sustained major damage and fifteen others suffered minor damage. A church was also damaged.						
EF1	NE of Mooringsport	Caddo	LA	32.6894°N 93.9399°W	04:51–04:53	1.04 mi (1.67 km)	100 yd (91 m)
EF1	A few structures sustained roof damage, with the roof being torn completely off a small outbuilding. A fence was damaged, and a few dozen trees were either snapped or uprooted.						

=== April 25 event ===
List of confirmed tornadoes – Thursday, April 25, 2019
EF#	Location	County / Parish	State	Start Coord.	Time (UTC)	Path length	Max width
EF1	NNE of Lucky	Bienville	LA	32.2606°N 93.0064°W	06:12–06:15	2.52 mi (4.06 km)	150 yd (140 m)
EF1	Tree branches were broken off and about 20 trees were either snapped or uprooted. Power poles were snapped as well.						
EF1	E of Bienville	Bienville	LA	32.3550°N 92.9253°W	06:25–06:26	1.03 mi (1.66 km)	200 yd (180 m)
EF1	This brief tornado snapped multiple power poles and downed 20 to 30 trees.						
EF3	Ruston	Lincoln	LA	32.5112°N 92.6729°W	06:47–07:00	11.15 mi (17.94 km)	1,000 yd (910 m)
EF3	2 deaths – See article on this tornado – A strong and damaging tornado moved directly through Ruston. Numerous trees were snapped, uprooted, or in some cases denuded and partially debarked. Many of these trees fell on homes and caused structural damage. The tornado heavily impacted Louisiana Tech University, where several large metal light poles at the softball, baseball, and athletic fields were bent or snapped. The baseball stadium sustained partial collapse of its concrete overhang, vehicles were lofted from parking lots and thrown into fields, and a number of dormitories had their metal roofs ripped off and windows shattered. Several well-built brick businesses sustained roof loss and collapse of exterior walls. A hotel lost its roof and numerous second floor exterior walls, while a nearby gas station and convenience store was destroyed. Homes and apartment buildings had their roofs torn off, two strip malls were heavily damaged, and power poles were snapped. The two fatalities occurred when a large tree crushed a home.						
EF1	N of Downsville to E of Marion	Union	LA	32.6914°N 92.3973°W	07:10–07:33	21.37 mi (34.39 km)	850 yd (780 m)
EF1	A long-tracked tornado snapped or uprooted numerous trees, some of which caused severe structural damage to one home upon falling.						
EF2	WNW of Beekman, LA to SSW of Hamburg, AR	Morehouse (LA), Ashley (AR)	LA, AR	32.9716°N 92.0133°W	07:44–08:01	15.99 mi (25.73 km)	2,000 yd (1,800 m)
EF2	A very large wedge tornado mowed down hundreds of trees along its path.						
EF2	NW of Jena	La Salle	LA	31.6716°N 92.2606°W	07:59–08:14	8.77 mi (14.11 km)	700 yd (640 m)
EF2	Numerous trees were snapped or uprooted, some of which fell on a number of mobile homes as well as a church. A house had half of its roof ripped off and its carport completely demolished.						
EF1	NW of Sugartown	Beauregard, Vernon	LA	30.8626°N 93.1036°W	09:56–10:01	3.17 mi (5.10 km)	500 yd (460 m)
EF1	Numerous trees were snapped or uprooted. One home had some of its roofing ripped off.						
EF1	S of Kiln	Hancock	MS	30.3935°N 89.4453°W	16:22–16:23	0.25 mi (0.40 km)	25 yd (23 m)
EF1	Numerous trees were snapped or uprooted.						
EF0	S of Little Texas	Tunica	MS	34.5659°N 90.2685°W	22:25–22:26	0.19 mi (0.31 km)	50 yd (46 m)
EF0	A brief landspout tornado caused no damage.						
EF1	S of North Vernon	Jennings	IN	38.9213°N 85.609°W	23:19–23:21	0.33 mi (0.53 km)	30 yd (27 m)
EF1	A garage was destroyed, and several of its concrete anchors were ripped out of the garage foundation. A trailer was flipped and rolled 5 yd (4.6 m), and two cars were pushed short distances, one of which had a window blown out. A glass patio table was tossed and damaged, and a home sustained substantial loss of roofing. The underside of the roof of its north facing front porch was blown out with insulation debris caked on the north and east sides of the house. A wicker chair from the front porch was tossed, and two logs were impaled through the windshield of a nearby SUV.						
EF0	ENE of Standing Pine	Leake	MS	32.6864°N 89.34°W	23:36–23:39	1.35 mi (2.17 km)	25 yd (23 m)
EF0	A senior care facility was damaged, as well as a barn, shed, and a fence and scoreboard at a baseball field.						
EF1	NE of North Vernon	Jennings	IN	39.1322°N 85.4821°W	23:52–23:53	0.05 mi (0.080 km)	30 yd (27 m)
EF1	Several trees were snapped and uprooted.						
EF0	W of Greenville	Darke	OH	40.0945°N 84.7771°W	02:07–02:09	0.99 mi (1.59 km)	80 yd (73 m)
EF0	A residence suffered roof damage, with pieces of wood and siding ripped from the porch and tossed about 150 yd (140 m). Several rotten trees were uprooted. Another house and some outbuildings sustained minor roof damage.						

=== April 26 event ===
List of confirmed tornadoes – Friday, April 26, 2019
EF#	Location	County / Parish	State	Start Coord.	Time (UTC)	Path length	Max width
EF0	Marbleton	Sublette	WY	42.558°N 110.1055°W	18:30–18:31	0.1 mi (0.16 km)	20 yd (18 m)
EF0	A brief tornado struck Marbleton and ripped a portion of the roof off of a manufactured home, and also moderately damaged a second mobile home. A travel trailer was destroyed.						
EF1	Monkton	Baltimore	MD	39.5647°N 76.6103°W	19:19–19:23	2.94 mi (4.73 km)	150 yd (140 m)
EF1	Numerous trees were snapped in Monkton. A house and a horse barn had two screens blown, and the slide of a swing set was torn off and blown toward the northeast.						

=== April 27 event ===
List of confirmed tornadoes – Saturday, April 27, 2019
EF#	Location	County / Parish	State	Start Coord.	Time (UTC)	Path length	Max width
EFU	WNW of Aspermont	Stonewall	TX	33.1913°N 100.3658°W	23:49–00:03	2.35 mi (3.78 km)	30 yd (27 m)
EFU	Multiple storm chasers witnessed a tornado.						

=== April 28 event ===
List of confirmed tornadoes – Sunday, April 28, 2019
EF#	Location	County / Parish	State	Start Coord.	Time (UTC)	Path length	Max width
EFU	NW of Wallace	Wallace	KS	39.0973°N 101.7311°W	21:35–21:45	1.9 mi (3.1 km)	100 yd (91 m)
EFU	Law enforcement and public reported a tornado.						

=== April 29 event ===
List of confirmed tornadoes – Monday, April 29, 2019
EF#	Location	County / Parish	State	Start Coord.	Time (UTC)	Path length	Max width
EF0	E of Osawatomie	Miami	KS	38.5032°N 94.81261°W	09:10–09:13	2.06 mi (3.32 km)	15 yd (14 m)
EF0	A brief tornado caused roof and wall damage to a church. Part of the roof was lifted and removed. Tombstones in a cemetery were damaged.						

=== April 30 event ===
List of confirmed tornadoes – Tuesday, April 30, 2019
EF#	Location	County / Parish	State	Start Coord.	Time (UTC)	Path length	Max width
EF1	E of Agra	Lincoln	OK	35.885°N 96.857°W	16:53–17:01	3 mi (4.8 km)	30 yd (27 m)
EF1	Trees were damaged.						
EFU	E of Dougherty	Murray	OK	34.4°N 96.9448°W	17:09	0.3 mi (0.48 km)	50 yd (46 m)
EFU	A storm chaser observed a brief tornado.						
EF1	Northeastern Cushing	Payne	OK	35.99°N 96.746°W	17:13–17:14	0.5 mi (0.80 km)	20 yd (18 m)
EF1	An energy company building suffered roof damage, and trees were damaged as well.						
EF1	E of Sulphur	Johnston, Murray	OK	34.504°N 96.8702°W	17:22–17:31	1.95 mi (3.14 km)	30 yd (27 m)
EF1	A number of trees were damaged.						
EFU	NE of Bartlett	Labette	KS	37.0802°N 95.2059°W	18:18-18:19	0.23 mi (0.37 km)	50 yd (46 m)
EFU	A brief, weak tornado remained in a field and caused no damage.						
EF0	NW of Pumpkin Center	Okmulgee	OK	35.7058°N 95.8747°W	19:03–19:10	2.5 mi (4.0 km)	100 yd (91 m)
EF0	Barns, outbuildings, and a mobile home were damaged. Some trees were uprooted as well.						
EF0	NW of Skiatook	Osage	OK	36.38°N 96.0511°W	19:14–19:16	1.2 mi (1.9 km)	50 yd (46 m)
EF0	Tree limbs were snapped.						
EF1	N of Haskell	Muskogee, Wagoner	OK	35.8546°N 95.6922°W	19:29–19:36	2.3 mi (3.7 km)	150 yd (140 m)
EF1	Barns, outbuildings, and a home were damaged or destroyed. A few trees were uprooted.						
EF2	NW of Talala	Washington, Rogers	OK	36.519°N 95.832°W	19:44–20:09	9.8 mi (15.8 km)	1,300 yd (1,200 m)
EF2	A large, strong tornado damaged several homes, barns, and shop buildings, including a well-built house that was severely damaged. Two double-pole cross-braced electrical transmission structures were also destroyed.						
EFU	W of Talala	Rogers	OK	36.5348°N 95.8042°W	19:51	0.1 mi (0.16 km)	50 yd (46 m)
EFU	A satellite tornado to the Talala tornado was observed by a storm chaser.						
EF1	SE of Lenapah	Nowata	OK	36.8425°N 95.6177°W	19:57–20:09	7.5 mi (12.1 km)	900 yd (820 m)
EF1	Trees were snapped and uprooted.						
EF1	N of Wagoner	Wagoner	OK	35.9993°N 95.4553°W	20:02–20:17	7.8 mi (12.6 km)	300 yd (270 m)
EF1	Outbuildings were damaged, trees were snapped or uprooted, and power poles were blown down.						
EF1	S of Bergman	Boone	AR	36.2981°N 93.0043°W	20:05–20:19	6.61 mi (10.64 km)	400 yd (370 m)
EF1	A couple manufactured homes were blown over, damaged, or completely destroyed. Multiple outbuildings were also damaged or destroyed. Several frame homes were damaged, and trees were snapped and uprooted. Power lines were downed as well.						
EF1	Southeastern Miller	Lawrence	MO	37.1961°N 93.8606°W	20:22–20:34	3.75 mi (6.04 km)	100 yd (91 m)
EF1	This tornado impacted the southern and eastern outskirts of Miller. Metal outbuildings and barns were damaged or destroyed. Several trees were damaged and power lines were downed, and a metal building had panels pulled off.						
EF1	SW of Rocky Comfort to NE of Wheaton	McDonald, Barry	MO	36.7077°N 94.1720°W	20:42–21:04	12.34 mi (19.86 km)	880 yd (800 m)
EF1	Numerous outbuildings and homes were damaged or destroyed by this high-end EF1 multiple-vortex tornado, including four barns that were completely destroyed. Hundreds of trees were damaged as well.						
EF1	NW of Theodosia	Taney, Ozark	MO	36.5416°N 92.7845°W	20:50–20:58	5.4 mi (8.7 km)	100 yd (91 m)
EF1	An outbuilding was destroyed, and numerous trees were downed.						
EFU	Lake Hudson	Mayes	OK	36.2563°N 95.1501°W	20:51	0.1 mi (0.16 km)	50 yd (46 m)
EFU	A waterspout was observed over Lake Hudson. It dissipated before moving ashore.						
EFU	SW of Loveland	Tillman	OK	34.2693°N 98.8072°W	20:51	0.2 mi (0.32 km)	30 yd (27 m)
EFU	A trained storm spotter reported a brief tornado.						
EF0	NNE of Donnellson	Montgomery	IL	39.0456°N 89.4682°W	20:52–20:54	1.17 mi (1.88 km)	25 yd (23 m)
EF0	A brief, weak tornado caused minor tree damage.						
EF0	SE of Bakersfield	Pecos	TX	30.7519°N 102.1601°W	21:13–21:16	0.91 mi (1.46 km)	200 yd (180 m)
EF0	A weak tornado remained over open country.						
EF1	N of Bluejacket	Craig, Ottawa	OK	36.8236°N 95.0748°W	21:15–21:28	6.3 mi (10.1 km)	800 yd (730 m)
EF1	A couple of homes and outbuildings were damaged. Trees were uprooted.						
EF0	NE of Purdy	Barry	MO	36.8532°N 93.8549°W	21:25–21:35	5.03 mi (8.10 km)	200 yd (180 m)
EF0	Several outbuildings were destroyed, and numerous trees were uprooted.						
EF0	SE of Fluvanna	Scurry	TX	32.879°N 101.1377°W	21:27–21:31	1.48 mi (2.38 km)	100 yd (91 m)
EF0	A weak tornado remained over open country.						
EF1	Miami	Ottawa	OK	36.8590°N 94.9586°W	21:29–21:44	7.2 mi (11.6 km)	700 yd (640 m)
EF1	Numerous homes and businesses in town were damaged, power poles were blown down, and trees were uprooted.						
EFU	NW of Dean	Clay	TX	34.00°N 98.42°W	21:34–21:36	1.5 mi (2.4 km)	40 yd (37 m)
EFU	A tornado was observed by multiple storm chasers and in conjunction with the subsequent Clay tornado for a brief period of time.						
EF1	NW of Dean to N of Charlie	Clay	TX	33.997°N 98.409°W	21:36–21:56	10 mi (16 km)	300 yd (270 m)
EF1	Trees, two outbuildings, and a house were damaged. A mobile home was unroofed.						
EF0	NW of Branson	Taney	MO	36.6596°N 93.2579°W	22:15–22:18	1.02 mi (1.64 km)	75 yd (69 m)
EF0	This tornado caused some tree damage and minor structural damage.						
EF1	N of Bernice	Delaware, Ottawa	OK	36.6346°N 94.9563°W	22:33–22:41	4.1 mi (6.6 km)	1,100 yd (1,000 m)
EF1	A large tornado damaged barns and outbuildings and also snapped or uprooted trees.						
EFU	ENE of Shell Knob	Barry	MO	36.6414°N 93.5987°W	22:41–22:42	0.53 mi (0.85 km)	50 yd (46 m)
EFU	Video was used to confirm a tornado over inaccessible and heavily forested areas.						
EF0	W of Goodhope	Christian, Douglas	MO	36.8947°N 92.9073°W	23:15–23:22	1.86 mi (2.99 km)	50 yd (46 m)
EF0	Several trees were damaged.						
EF1	E of Justin	Denton	TX	33.0838°N 97.2773°W	23:25–23:29	1.46 mi (2.35 km)	150 yd (140 m)
EF1	Numerous trees were snapped and uprooted, and several homes suffered minor roof damage as well.						
EF1	NE of Squires	Douglas	MO	36.8195°N 92.6849°W	23:44–00:04	8.57 mi (13.79 km)	200 yd (180 m)
EF1	A church sustained structural damage, and significant tree damage occurred.						
EF0	SW of Cassville	Barry	MO	36.6531°N 93.8785°W	23:48–23:53	1.9 mi (3.1 km)	75 yd (69 m)
EF0	Several large trees were downed, with one falling on a house.						
EF1	Denton	Denton	TX	33.226°N 97.1252°W	23:52–00:01	2.89 mi (4.65 km)	250 yd (230 m)
EF1	A tornado touched down at the Texas Woman's University campus, damaging trees. Additional trees were snapped or uprooted along the remainder of the path, some of which fell and inflicted substantial damage to homes and vehicles.						
EF1	W of Brushyknob	Douglas	MO	36.9327°N 92.5663°W	00:06–00:10	3.05 mi (4.91 km)	200 yd (180 m)
EF1	Numerous large trees were snapped.						
EF1	Macomb	Wright	MO	37.0899°N 92.4868°W	00:30–00:34	1.43 mi (2.30 km)	75 yd (69 m)
EF1	A sawmill and office building sustained structural damage, and several trees were damaged.						
EF1	NW of Miller	Lawrence, Dade	MO	37.2863°N 93.9114°W	00:39–00:41	0.6 mi (0.97 km)	50 yd (46 m)
EF1	Numerous trees were uprooted, and one fell on a house.						
EF1	S of Eudora	Polk	MO	37.4450°N 93.5552°W	00:40–00:42	1.84 mi (2.96 km)	100 yd (91 m)
EF1	The roof was removed from one home and another was damaged. A camper was overturned, and multiple trees were snapped or uprooted.						
EF0	SW of Mountain Grove	Wright	MO	37.0927°N 92.3208°W	00:58–01:05	2.41 mi (3.88 km)	100 yd (91 m)
EF0	Several outbuildings were damaged or destroyed, and a home was damaged. Many trees were downed as well.						
EF1	N of Willard	Greene	MO	37.328°N 93.4614°W	01:15–01:17	1.78 mi (2.86 km)	200 yd (180 m)
EF1	Several trees were uprooted or snapped.						
EF1	NE of Willard	Greene	MO	37.3560°N 93.3902°W	01:21–01:23	1.71 mi (2.75 km)	200 yd (180 m)
EF1	One home had its roof removed, and several outbuildings were destroyed. Numerous trees were also uprooted.						
EF2	Northern Ozark to NW of Rogersville	Christian, Greene	MO	37.0688°N 93.1978°W	01:28–01:49	10.28 mi (16.54 km)	400 yd (370 m)
EF2	This high-end EF2 tornado touched down in a subdivision at the north side of Ozark, where multiple homes sustained roof and exterior wall loss. Additional homes were severely damaged or destroyed near Rogersville, including one that was left with only portions of a few walls standing. Several outbuildings and a shop building were also destroyed. Hundreds of trees were downed, and three people were injured.						
EF0	W of Pumpkin Center	Dallas	MO	37.7205°N 93.121°W	01:30–01:33	1.5 mi (2.4 km)	50 yd (46 m)
EF0	Several outbuildings and a pole barn were destroyed, and trees were uprooted and snapped.						
EF1	N of Galena to SW of Chadwick	Stone, Christian	MO	36.806°N 93.5405°W	01:35–02:00	23.29 mi (37.48 km)	100 yd (91 m)
EF1	A large machine shed had its roof removed, one home had its roof damaged, two outbuildings were destroyed, a pickup truck was rolled approximately 40 yd (37 m) into a house, and numerous trees were snapped or uprooted. One tree fell on and damaged a home.						
EF1	E of Long Lane	Dallas	MO	37.6113°N 92.9102°W	01:49–01:53	0.3 mi (0.48 km)	70 yd (64 m)
EF1	Two small barns were destroyed, and several trees were snapped or uprooted.						
EF3	SE of Blue to NNE of Lane	Bryan, Atoka	OK	33.9711°N 96.2071°W	02:07–02:42	27.6 mi (44.4 km)	1,400 yd (1,300 m)
EF3	2 deaths – A large and intense tornado damaged or destroyed a number of mobile homes, including one that was blown about 50–70 yd (46–64 m) into a grove of trees. Two fatalities occurred as a result of the demolished structures. Elsewhere, a cabin or small home was destroyed and a few other houses suffered damage. Trees, power poles, and sheds were all damaged along the path as well.						
EF0	NW of Hartville	Wright	MO	37.2799°N 92.5601°W	02:27–02:28	0.53 mi (0.85 km)	50 yd (46 m)
EF0	This tornado removed shingles, damaged mobile homes, and uprooted multiple trees.						
EF1	SW of Lehigh	Coal	OK	34.436°N 96.255°W	02:34–02:35	0.75 mi (1.21 km)	25 yd (23 m)
EF1	Trees were damaged.						
EF1	N of Norwood	Wright	MO	37.1596°N 92.4533°W	02:35–02:38	2.17 mi (3.49 km)	100 yd (91 m)
EF1	Numerous trees were blown down, and three outbuildings were destroyed.						
EF0	WSW of Brushyknob	Douglas	MO	36.9572°N 92.5184°W	02:40–02:44	2.86 mi (4.60 km)	100 yd (91 m)
EF0	Numerous trees were downed, a few of which were snapped.						
EF1	Dawson to ESE of Huggins	Wright, Texas	MO	37.2625°N 92.3083°W	02:42–02:55	12.19 mi (19.62 km)	500 yd (460 m)
EF1	A barn was destroyed, multiple outbuildings and a mobile home were damaged, and numerous trees were snapped or uprooted.						
EF1	E of Huggins	Texas	MO	37.3236°N 92.1228°W	02:51–02:56	5.64 mi (9.08 km)	100 yd (91 m)
EF1	The roof was ripped off a pole barn. Numerous trees were snapped or uprooted, some of which caused minor damage to a mobile home.						
EF0	NW of Licking	Texas, Phelps	MO	37.5468°N 91.9741°W	02:58–03:03	6.04 mi (9.72 km)	50 yd (46 m)
EF0	Numerous large trees were uprooted.						
EF0	N of Jerome	Phelps	MO	37.9779°N 91.9659°W	03:03–03:05	0.59 mi (0.95 km)	75 yd (69 m)
EF0	A home's expansive deck and retaining wall suffered damage, in addition to a vehicle and numerous trees.						
EF0	E of Edgar Springs	Phelps	MO	37.652°N 91.8521°W	03:06–03:13	5.08 mi (8.18 km)	75 yd (69 m)
EF0	Numerous trees were snapped or uprooted.						
EF0	NW of Willow Springs	Howell	MO	37.0267°N 91.9902°W	03:17–03:20	2.18 mi (3.51 km)	100 yd (91 m)
EF0	This tornado damaged a barn, removed shingles from two roofs, and snapped or uprooted numerous trees.						
EF2	Haileyville	Pittsburg	OK	34.7900°N 95.6489°W	03:41–03:57	10 mi (16 km)	1,300 yd (1,200 m)
EF2	A strong wedge tornado struck Haileyville. Numerous barns, outbuildings, homes and businesses were significantly damaged in and around town, and many large trees were snapped or uprooted. An electrical substation was severely damaged, and power poles were snapped. One person was injured.						
EF1	NW of Belleview	Iron	MO	37.7179°N 90.8035°W	04:26–04:27	0.06 mi (0.097 km)	30 yd (27 m)
EF1	A farm outbuilding was destroyed.						
EF1	W of Summerfield	Le Flore	OK	34.8990°N 94.9094°W	04:51–04:56	4.4 mi (7.1 km)	1,000 yd (910 m)
EF1	Outbuildings were damaged and a number of trees were uprooted.						

== See also ==
- Tornadoes of 2019
- List of United States tornadoes from January to March 2019
- List of United States tornadoes in May 2019
