= 2011 Smithville tornado =

2011 EF5 tornado in Mississippi and Alabama, U.S.

Coordinates: 34.0455°N 88.4450°W

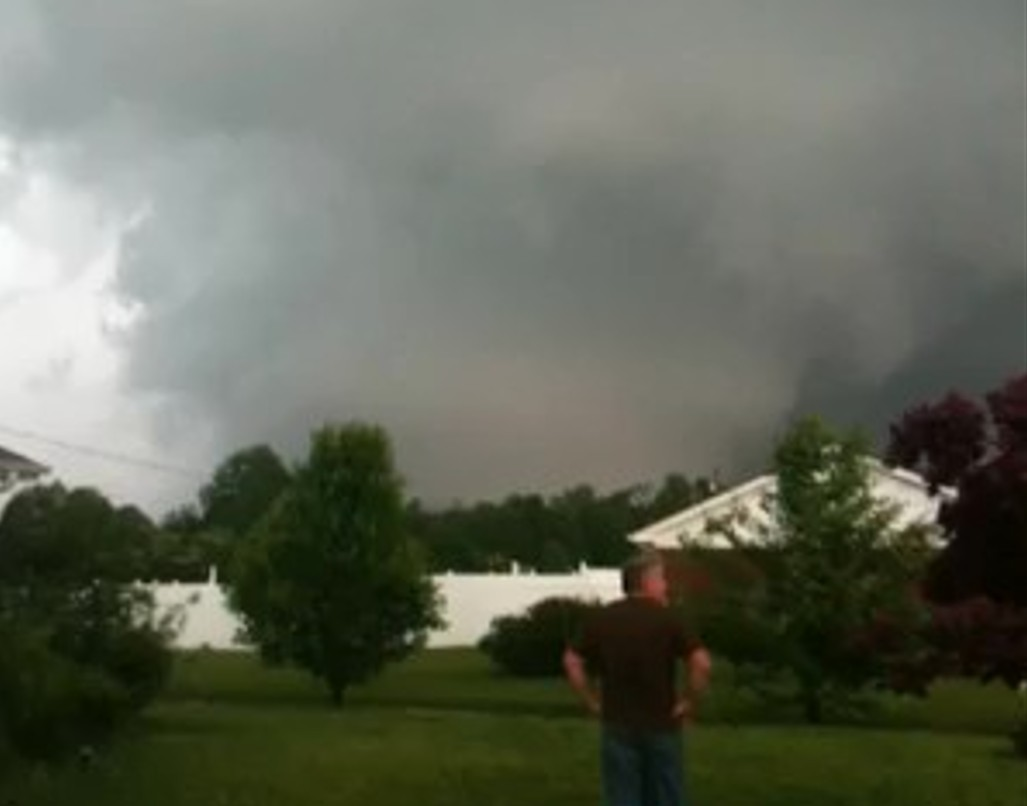
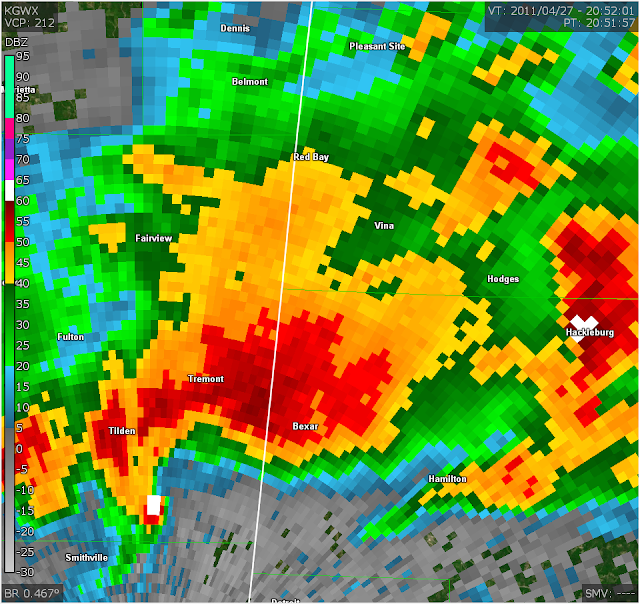
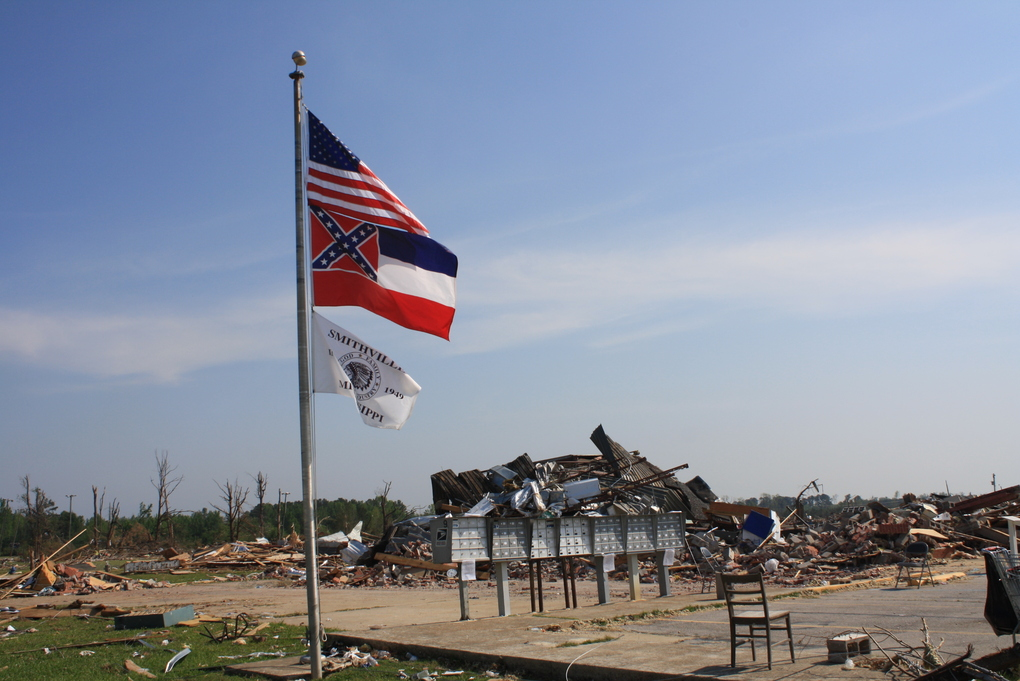
- Clockwise from top: The tornado at peak intensity in northern Smithville as seen from 2 miles to the south; EF5 damage to a post office that was swept clean off its foundation in Smithville, radar image showing the supercell and hook echo of the storm that produced the Smithville tornado, with a debris ball evident

Meteorological history
- Formed: April 27, 2011, 3:42 p.m. CDT (UTC–05:00)
- Dissipated: April 27, 2011, 4:23 p.m. CDT (UTC–05:00)
- Duration: 41 minutes

EF5 tornado
- on the Enhanced Fujita scale
- Max width: 1,320 yards (0.75 mi; 1.2 km)
- Path length: 37.3 miles (60.0 km)
- Highest winds: 205 mph (330 km/h)

Overall effects
- Fatalities: 23
- Injuries: 137
- Damage: $14.4 million (2011 USD)
- Part of the 2011 Super Outbreak and Tornadoes of 2011

In the afternoon hours of April 27, 2011, an extremely violent and fast-moving EF5 tornado, known most commonly as the Smithville tornado, devastated areas of rural Mississippi and Alabama, including the town of Smithville, Mississippi, resulting in catastrophic damage and 23 fatalities. This tornado was a part of the 2011 Super Outbreak, the largest tornado outbreak in United States history, and the third of four EF5 tornadoes to touch down on April 27, 2011, during the outbreak's most prolific day for tornadoes. The tornado reached an estimated maximum width of 3/4 mile (1.2 km) with estimated wind speeds of 205 mph (330 km/h).

The tornado officially formed at 3:42 p.m. CDT 3 miles (4.8 km) west-southwest of Smithville along the Tennessee–Tombigbee Waterway, before quickly strengthening and striking Smithville, causing catastrophic damage. The tornado swept away numerous homes and structures as it moved northeast, following MS 25. Overall, the tornado destroyed 117 structures in Smithville and damaged 50 others. Continuing northeast, the tornado continued across the Alabama state line into Marion County, where it caused damage near Bexar, Shottsville and north of Hamilton. More structures were impacted as the tornado approached and crossed into Franklin County. The tornado then dissipated near the town of Hodges at 4:23 p.m. CDT (21:23 UTC). The damage path was 37.3 miles (60.0 km) long.

== Meteorological synopsis ==
=== Setup ===
The environmental conditions leading up to the 2011 Super Outbreak were among the "most conducive to violent tornadoes ever documented". On April 25, a vigorous upper-level shortwave trough moved into the Southern Plains states. Ample instability, low-level moisture, and wind shear all fueled a significant tornado outbreak from Texas to Tennessee; at least 64 tornadoes touched down on this day. An area of low pressure consolidated over Texas on April 26 and traveled east while the aforementioned shortwave trough traversed the Mississippi and Ohio River valleys. Another 50 tornadoes touched down on this day. The multi-day outbreak culminated on April 27 with the most violent day of tornadic activity since the 1974 Super Outbreak. Multiple episodes of tornadic activity ensued with two waves of mesoscale convective systems in the morning hours followed by a widespread outbreak of supercells from Mississippi to North Carolina during the afternoon into the evening.

Tornadic activity on April 27 was precipitated by a 995 mbar (hPa; 29.39 inHg) surface low situated over Kentucky and a deep, negatively tilted (aligned northwest to southeast) trough over Arkansas and Louisiana. A strong southwesterly surface jet intersected these systems at a 60° angle, an ageostrophic flow that led to storm-relative helicity values in excess of 500 m^{2}s^{−2}—indicative of extreme wind shear and a very high potential for rotating updrafts within supercells. Ample moisture from the Gulf of Mexico was brought north across the Deep South, leading to daytime high temperatures of 77 to 81 °F (25 to 27 °C) and dewpoints of 66 to 72 °F (19 to 22 °C). Furthermore, convective available potential energy (CAPE) values reached 2,500–3,000 J/kg.

=== Forecast ===
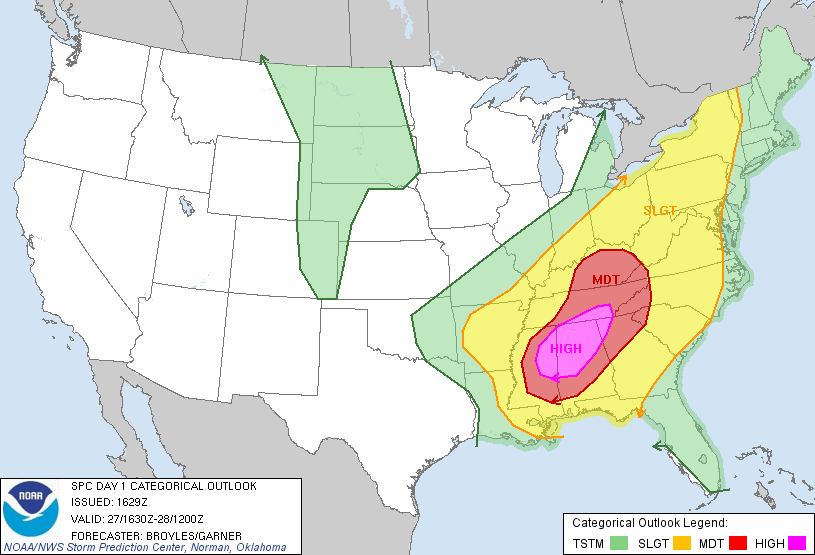
The National Weather Service Storm Prediction Center's Day 1 Convective Outlook for April 27, showing the Categorical Graphic

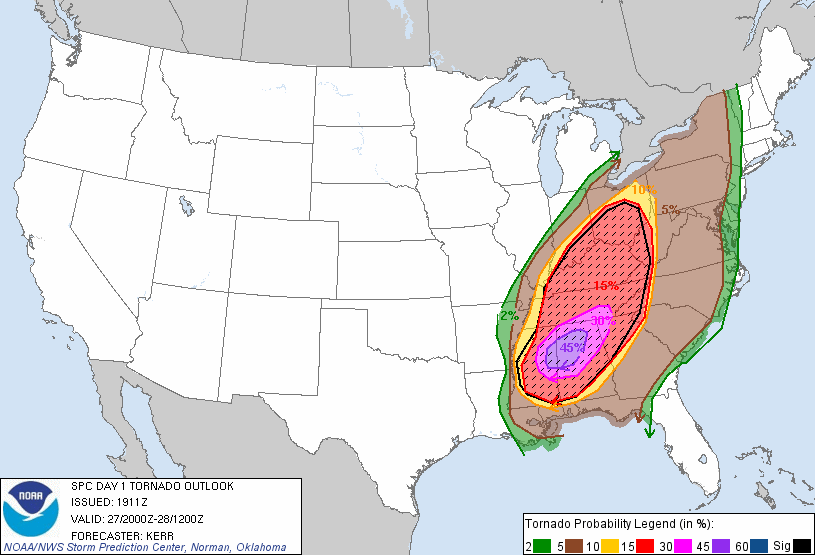
The probability of a tornado within 25 miles of a point (cross-hatched area: 10% or greater probability of EF2+ tornadoes)

On the morning of April 27, a strong cold front with several areas of embedded low pressure extended from the Texas Hill Country northeastward towards the Arklatex and the Ozarks, and later into the lower Ohio Valley. Warm moist air was in place due to strong southerly flow ahead of the front over Mississippi, Alabama, and Tennessee. An upper level disturbance sparked a broad area of showers and thunderstorms as it moved across the frontal boundary on the previous evening. The eastern edge of the line of showers and storms continued to move eastward, in concert with the upper disturbance, reaching the northwest Alabama border around 2:00 a.m. CDT.

This produced the last and most violent round of severe weather, which began around 2:30 p.m. CDT for northern Alabama as supercells began to line up to the southwest of the area. During the early afternoon hours, the potential for destructive tornadoes was highlighted by the Storm Prediction Center's upgrade to a high risk for severe weather around 1:00 p.m. CDT. This prompted a particularly dangerous situation (PDS) tornado watch, which was issued for northern Alabama and portions of southern Tennessee at 1:45 p.m. CDT. The bulletin that accompanied the watch read:

THE NWS STORM PREDICTION CENTER HAS ISSUED A TORNADO WATCH FOR PORTIONS OF: MUCH OF ALABAMA, NORTHWEST GEORGIA, SOUTHEAST MISSISSIPPI, SOUTHERN MIDDLE TENNESSEE, EFFECTIVE THIS WEDNESDAY AFTERNOON AND EVENING FROM 145 PM UNTIL 1000 PM CDT.

...THIS IS A PARTICULARLY DANGEROUS SITUATION...

DESTRUCTIVE TORNADOES...LARGE HAIL TO 4 INCHES IN DIAMETER. THUNDERSTORM WIND GUSTS TO 80 MPH...AND DANGEROUS LIGHTNING ARE POSSIBLE IN THESE AREAS.

The potential for tornadoes ramped up from noon through 9:00 p.m. CDT. During this period, much of Mississippi and Alabama experienced numerous supercell thunderstorms that produced violent tornadoes, including four EF5 tornadoes, one being the Smithville tornado. The Smithville supercell itself existed along a thermal boundary in northeastern Mississippi. This was an east–west oriented outflow boundary left behind by the morning squall line. This boundary is also assumed to be the same boundary that the Hackleburg tornado developed on. Conditions were locally enhanced by more easterly surface winds generated along the residual boundary, allowing for a corridor of enhanced tornado potential.

== Tornado summary ==
=== Formation and track into Smithville ===
- Damage survey track of this tornado (centermost purple line), as well as the tracks of other EF3+ tornadoes that occurred during 2011 Super Outbreak. (Interactive map, click or tap to view in detail); View mapdata Key EF0 65–85 mph (105–137 km/h); EF1 86–110 mph (138–177 km/h); EF2 111–135 mph (179–217 km/h); EF3 136–165 mph (219–266 km/h); EF4 166–200 mph (267–322 km/h); EF5 ≥201 mph (323 km/h)

After producing a long-tracked EF3 tornado that passed near New Wren, the same supercell produced this tornado that began 3 miles (4.8 km) west-southwest of Smithville along the Tennessee–Tombigbee Waterway near the Glover Wilkins Lock at 3:42 pm. CDT (2042 UTC). The funnel itself explicitly touched down at exactly 3:43 pm. CDT (2043 UTC), snapping numerous trees near the Smithville Recreation Area and scouring the ground. As the tornado crossed Davis Road South, it explosively intensified and reached violent intensity, shredding trees and deeply scouring the ground in a nearby field, leaving a trench that was still visible in aerial photographs taken more than a year later. The tornado began producing intense damage and swept away multiple homes and structures as it moved northeast following MS 25, though many were poorly-constructed manufactured homes. More well-built homes in the area suffered collapses of their exterior walls and the removal of their roof structures.

A CCTV security camera showing the tornado approaching the Smithville Police Department

The first fatality from the tornado occurred in this area as a bed and breakfast was destroyed and swept from its foundation, with debris from the structure scattered long distances downwind. Cinder blocks from the structure were broken into small pieces of concrete and strewn throughout a nearby field. A semi-truck was thrown 300 yd (270 m) and destroyed in this area, and an RV was thrown 250 yd (230 m) and partially embedded into the ground nearby. The town's Dollar General and its only Piggly Wiggly grocery store were gutted and suffered severe damage to their roof structures. The First Free Will Baptist Church of Smithville was completely destroyed in this area as all of its walls completely collapsed with only the pews remaining. Another church in town suffered similar damage to its exterior walls as well. A second semi-truck was completely torn apart, with only its bumper later found hanging from the struts of the Smithville water tower, located 1.4-mile (2.3 km) to the northeast. One brick residence was swept away along this segment of the path as well, and part of its concrete foundation slab was pulled up and slightly dislodged, with extensive ground scouring and debarking of trees noted on the property. The tornado, slightly weakening yet maintaining EF5 intensity, scoured the topsoil to a depth of one foot (30 cm). Several metal storage buildings and 14 mobile homes were obliterated nearby, with metal framing from some of the mobile homes thrown and twisted into pieces.

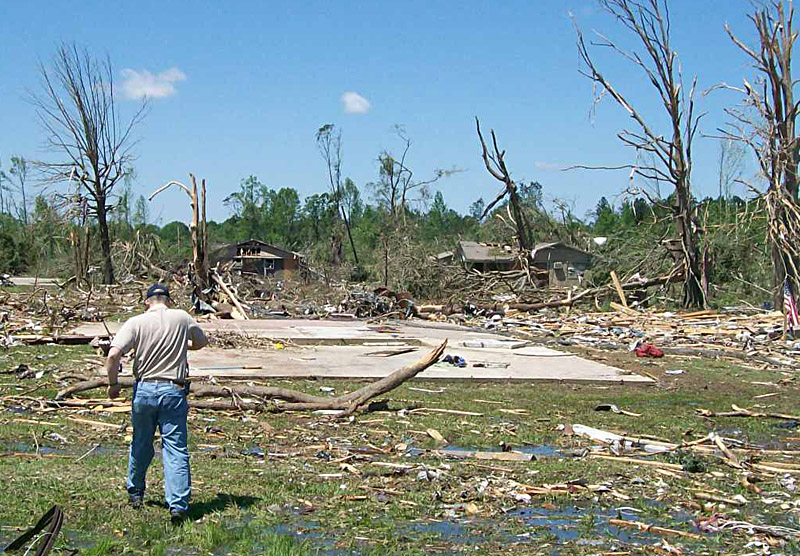
EF5 damage to a large, well-built, anchored house in Smithville, Mississippi

A Ford Explorer was thrown a 1/2-mile (0.80 km) into the top of the Smithville water tower, then bounced off of it, leaving a large dent, and was hurled an additional 1/4-mile (400 m) before impacting the ground and eventually coming to rest on the opposite side of the city. From then on, the tornado strengthened even further as it reached its peak intensity, tearing into the town's eastern subdivision as it destroyed numerous well-built and newly constructed homes, including some that were under 10 years old, at violent intensity, with flooring tiles and sill plates were being removed from foundations in the most severely affected areas. The town's police station, town hall and fire department all suffered significant damage as all of their exterior and interior walls were completely collapsed. The town's post office was completely swept from its foundation and multiple brick shops including a gift shop and a hardware store suffered major damage to their roof structures and exterior walls. The town’s only bank and water system were also completely destroyed. Tar and chip pavement was torn from a road in town and rolled into piles, intense ground scouring was noted in several areas, and a 1965 Chevrolet pickup truck was thrown from one residence and, according to speculation by the truck's owner, likely deposited 0.3 miles (0.48 km) north into the Tennessee-Tombigbee Waterway's Pool B, near the Glover Wilkins Lock. Several other vehicles in town were thrown hundreds of yards, torn into multiple pieces, stripped down to their frames, or wrapped around trees as well. Some instances of damage show that many of the vehicles wrapped around trees encountered extreme sub-vortices, with some sections of sheet metal having been wrapped around trees multiple times. The local medical clinic was destroyed as well, with supplies being scattered around the city.

=== Itawamba County ===
Damage to a home and gravestones in Smithville's cemetery

The large brick E.E. Pickle Funeral Home was reduced to a bare slab as the tornado exited the northeast side of the city, with the debris scattered and wind-rowed into an adjacent wooded area. Extreme debarking and denuding of trees was noted in the same wooded areas and pieces of vehicles and structures were strewn long distances into the nearby treeline. The mangled remains of the Ford Explorer that impacted the water tower was found crushed and flattened in a ditch at the edge of these debarked wooded areas. Around this area, it is possible that a "secondary core" existed, this is evident by nearby granite tombstones from a cemetery being blown over in the opposite direction of the tornado's passage, with some being broken and thrown. The town’s school complex suffered major damage to its roof structure in this area as well. From this point on, the tornado began to gradually weaken as it continued through rural areas northeast of town and moved into Itawamba County, where it uprooted numerous trees and power lines and caused roof damage to a home before exiting the county and crossing the Alabama state line.

=== Crossing into Alabama, weakening and dissipation ===
A home that was completely destroyed near Shottsville

The tornado then continued into Marion County, where it caused EF1 damage to outbuildings and mobile homes near Bexar. Continuing northeast, the tornado re-intensified as it struck the rural community of Shottsville at high-end EF3 intensity, where homes and mobile homes were destroyed, hundreds of trees were snapped and debarked, and eight more people were killed. The tornado produced additional high-end EF3 damage as it continued north of Hamilton, where several mobile homes and frame homes were destroyed, including one frame home at the bottom of a ravine that was swept clean from its foundation (though lack of road access prevented close inspection of the home's construction, precluding a potential higher rating at that location; this implies that the tornado had reached violent intensity once again). Several additional homes were damaged, and a chicken house was destroyed as the tornado approached Franklin County. The tornado then crossed the county line and weakened to EF2 strength, where it snapped and uprooted numerous large trees, damaged or destroyed several chicken houses, totaled a car, destroyed a mobile home, tore much of the roof off of a two-story house, and caused significant roof damage to several other homes. The tornado finally dissipated near the town of Hodges at 4:23 pm. CDT (2123 UTC), only a few miles away from where another EF5 tornado touched down over an hour earlier.

== Aftermath ==
=== Damage and fatalities ===
Smithville residents return to a damaged home to retrieve their personal belongings

Over $14.4 million dollars in damages was inflicted along the tornado's 37.3 miles (60.0 km) long and 3/4 mile (1.2 km) wide path. In Smithville and surrounding areas in Mississippi, at least 70 homes were destroyed, including 18 of which that were completely destroyed and 8 that suffered major structural damage. In Marion and Franklin County, at least 25 homes suffered some degree of damage. In total, 23 people were killed and 137 were injured by the tornado. The town's Piggly Wiggly grocery store was completely demolished, forcing residents to drive to neighboring towns such as Amory and Fulton. The police force lost all of its cars and suffered significant damage to its station, as did the local fire department. four of the town’s churches were completely destroyed, as well its town hall, bank and post office. Many headstones in the local cemetery were thrown and broken. To this day, many foundation slabs, as well as the large dent in the town’s water tower, remain. The town’s demographics were also significantly shifted, with the town’s population dropping nearly 46% from 942 residents down to 509 residents between the 2010 and 2020 censuses, though this has been disputed by the town’s officials.

List of fatalities in Smithville
Name	Refs.
Maxine Chism	
Jesse C. Cox
Courtney Danielle Easter
Mavis Jean Manley
Betty Lou Newkirk
Allen Scott Morris
Hazel Noe
Jessica Leigh Pace
Ruth Estis
Roy Lee Estis
Celia Fay Jackson
Karla Jones
Lucille Parker
Laverne Patterson
Elvin Ray Patterson

List of fatalities in Marion County
Name	Refs.
Rodney Gene Ables	
Michelle Brown
Tammy Johnson
Jacob Ralph Ray
Virginia Jenny Ann Revis
Allan Mark Wideman
Jeanette Cochran Wideman
Mildred Elam

=== Cleanup and recovery ===
A National Guard soldier that was deployed to Smithville carries aid items for civilians

Immediately following the tornado, multiple organizations arrived to offer aid in the town, including the Red Cross and the Salvation Army, which provided $45,000 in food, water, clothes, kid’s toys, tools and safety equipment courtesy of the St. Rose Volunteer Fire Department and many other donors from Alabama and Mississippi. Mississippi's governor Haley Barbour visited Smithville several days after the tornado struck and surveyed the damage. Federal officials provided over $1.8 million to aid in the reconstruction of the town while The Federal Emergency Management Agency (FEMA) provided over $23 million to various regional agencies and organizations to fund 630 projects throughout Mississippi, including the town of Smithville, such as debris removal and expansions of infrastructure. The Mississippi National Guard was deployed to the town of Smithville and a curfew was enforced to crack down on looting and to aid in the cleanup of debris. The Smithville Baptist Church unveiled an over $3 million project to construct an even larger church building than the one before the tornado, two-thirds of which was paid off by insurance and FEMA aid. The local Dollar General had reopened by August, as had the town's bank, the Texaco station, and Mel's Diner. The Monroe Chamber of Commerce provided assistance to eight industries in Smithville, securing $4.1 million in new grant funds for projects throughout town. United Furnishings, a large employer in the region, pledged $150,000 to aid in the cleanup and economic recovery of the town. Townhouse Home Furnishings, whose plant employed 175 workers in Smithville, was forced to move production to other plants such as the one in Mantachie. With help from the Appalachian Regional Commission and the Community Development Block Grant Program, they maintained steady operations at their other plants while simultaneously funding the reconstruction of their Smithville plant. With the combined efforts of the town's businesses and multiple organizations, 1,258 people retained their jobs and 603 new jobs were created. In addition to this aid, two anonymous donors provided a combined total of $150,000 as well as $1000 to each survivor of the tornado.

Various State and Federal officials, including Mississippi Governor Haley Barbour (left, light blue shirt), DHS Secretary Janet Napolitano (left) and Secretary of Agriculture Tom Vilsack ( black shirt, right) attend a speech given by FEMA Administrator Craig Fugate.

The town's officials looked to Greensburg, which had been hit by a similarly devastating tornado 4 years prior, as a model for its reconstruction. 27 fourth-year architecture students from the Carl Small Town Institute visited the town, taking notes of what they had done right, particularly its focus on sustainability and modernization while also noting a need for the maintenance of a "small-town ambiance", later showing what they had learned and their plans to rebuild the town hall, police station, fire station, and library in a presentation to the town's officials in December, which later had to be downscaled as they were significantly over the town's $660,000 budget allotted for the project. The Small Business Association also provided major assistance. Mayor Gregg Kennedy receiving a Phoenix Award from the Small Business Association for his efforts in the town's reconstruction. The destruction of homes in Smithville that had previously blocked development allowed the Department of Transportation to begin work on a project to expand State Highway 25 through town. The Smithville Telephone Co. received a $7.9 million dollar grant through the American Reinvestment and Recovery act (ARRA) to expand its broadband infrastructure to 10 miles in every direction of the city. Students in Smithville were temporarily forced to learn from a temporary campus consisting of 44 double-wide trailers with storm shelters available nearby, and the town's church was moved to two warehouses, with a stained-glass window that had survived the tornado being hung on the wall. Reconstruction of the Smithville Attendance Center costed roughly $14 million, with the new building being among the first schools to utilize a competition dome in Mississippi, which was built to FEMA P-361 standards, doubling as a public tornado shelter for the town. Post boxes that had survived the tornado were moved to the nearby Texaco gas station, where they remain in the present day. The town received a lease on areas on the Tennessee-Tombigbee Waterway that were owned by the U.S. Army Corps of Engineers to build new sports areas, such as a Little League baseball field, in.

=== Legacy ===
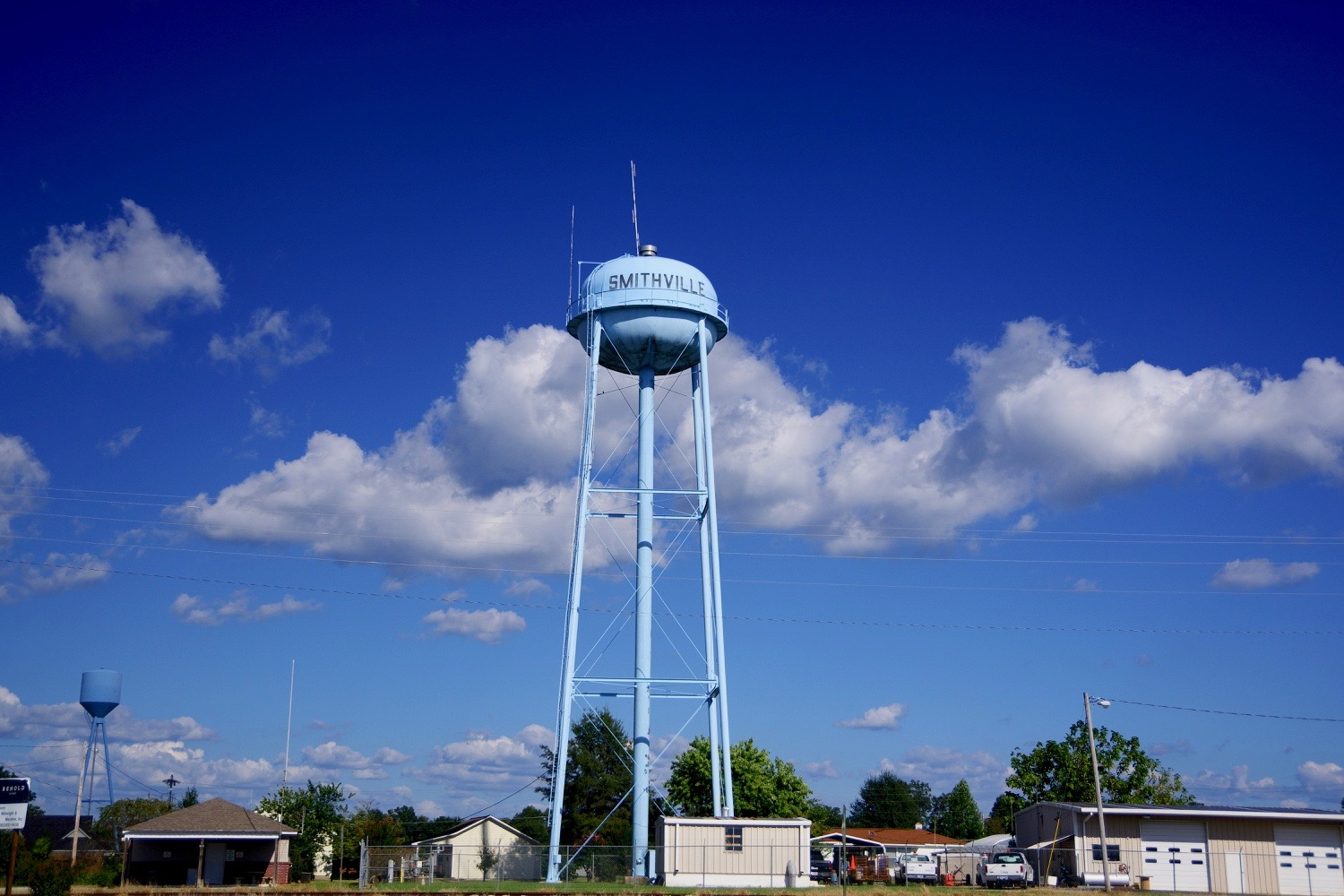
The Smithville water tower, as seen in 2018

Events were held for the tornado's 5-year and 10-year anniversary in the Smithville High School's competition dome. For the 10-year event, the High School's band showcased a before and after slideshow showcasing damage inflicted by the tornado. The local church held similar services honoring the tornado's victims, ringing its bells at 3:47, the time when the tornado was inflicting its worst damage, in their memory during both events. In 2024, the 13th anniversary of the tornado, the town unveiled Johnny Parker Street, located near Memorial Park, in honor of the meteorologist of the same name who had provided significant prior warning for the residents of Smithville online. In the Smithville Memorial Park, a monument was constructed in memory of the 16 people in town that were killed by the tornado. The town has approved plans for the construction of a new Freshly’s Market on Highway 25, which would be the first grocery store located in Smithville since the tornado, however funding and legal complications have led to significant delays in the project.

== Academic studies ==
=== 2011 MSU survey ===
In 2011, members of the Mississippi State University conducted a series of surveys with 29 people in the town of Smithville, ranging from the ages of 19 to 79. The study found that the majority of the 29 residents surveyed relied on TV and the town's tornado sirens to be alerted of the incoming tornado. 22 of the 29 residents that were surveyed had taken shelter, with the most common place that residents who were at their homes sheltered being hallways, with the second most common being bathrooms. The seven residents surveyed who did not shelter most commonly cited that they did not think the tornado sirens were necessary as the towns sirens rarely had to "sound for real tornadoes". The survey also asked the residents what they recommended to improve the town's prior warning, with those over the age of 50 mostly making various suggestions to improve warning systems, such as sirens being able to distinguish between “is it right here or will it be later?”, sirens being louder, and better siren coverage, while those under 50 more frequently made unspecified requests for improvements to digital alert systems.

=== 2013 AMS study ===
In 2013, members of the American Meteorological Society utilized Facebook posts to track the characteristics and trajectories of 934 items and debris thrown by tornadoes throughout the 2011 Super Outbreak, including some that were thrown by the Smithville tornado, such as a metal sign of band member Lee Frederick, which was found 80 km (50 miles) to the northwest of Russellville. The study found that that the majority of heavy debris and items landed within 25 km (15 miles) of their source, while the majority of light items landed within 144 km (89 miles) of their source. It also found that the outbreak's strong upper-level winds allowed items to be carried significantly farther by storms' updrafts than those found during a typical outbreak. Also noted was that the majority of items and debris were thrown to the right of tornadoes, rather than the left, as had been stated in previous studies. The study was the first of its kind to use high-resolution numerical trajectory analysis and was the largest up to that point.

=== 2014 MSU study and survey ===
In 2014, members of the Mississippi State University conducted a study to determine the reasons that residents remained or left following natural disasters and if natural disasters were a significant factor at all. A series of 17 surveys were conducted in Smithville, which found that 8 of the respondents had a neighbor, friend, or relative that left following the tornado. The study found that the most common reason residents remained was attachment to the town, particularly their families and neighbors. The members also conducted studies on where residents of tornado-prone areas moved after tornadoes, finding that more residents moved from tornado-prone areas to non-tornado prone areas, and that the residents most likely to move following a natural disaster such as a tornado were the elderly, Latinos, and African Americans. The surveyors concluded that natural disasters do play a role in migration between regions, and that socioeconomic factors play a major role in residents' decision to leave or to stay.

=== Internet misinformation ===
In 2012, a presentation and paper, given at the 26th Conference on Severe Local Storms by Eugene W. McCaul, with the Universities Space Research Association; Kevin R. Knupp, an atmospheric science professor at the University of Alabama; Chris Darden, a meteorologist at the National Weather Service of Huntsville, Alabama; and Kevin Laws, a meteorologist at the National Weather Service of Birmingham, Alabama, stated fictional information about the tornado was being spread online. Specifically, reports that the tornado had ripped a steel drainage pipe several feet out of the ground were proven to have been fabricated and that road crews had dug up the pipe to ensure vehicular safety as the road was previously declared unsafe.

== See also ==
- 2011 Hackleburg-Phil Campbell tornado - Another deadly EF5 tornado that was ongoing throughout this tornado’s lifespan
- 2011 Philadelphia tornado - Another violent EF5 tornado during the same outbreak that impacted areas in Mississippi
- 2023 Amory Tornado - Another deadly tornado that impacted the town of Smithville
- List of F5, EF5, and IF5 tornadoes
- Tornadoes of 2011
- List of tornadoes in the 2011 Super Outbreak
