= Henry Lloyd Finch =

American politician

Member of the Mississippi Senate from the 2nd district
- In office January 1944 – January 1948

Member of the Mississippi House of Representatives from the Jasper County district
- In office January 1916 – January 1924

Personal details
- Born: March 10, 1883 Polkville, Mississippi
- Party: Democrat

Henry Lloyd Finch was a lawyer Democratic Party member of both houses in the Mississippi legislature in the early-to-mid 20th century.

== Early life and education ==
Henry Lloyd Finch was born on March 10, 1883, in Polkville, Mississippi. He was the son of Christopher Finch and Mary Elizabeth (Evans) Finch.

Finch was educated in the Mississippi Conference Training School. For four years, he taught in the public schools of Jasper County, Mississippi. He graduated from the Law Department of Millsaps College in 1907 with a L. L. B. degree.

== Career ==
He began practicing law the same year in Paulding, Mississippi. He moved to Heidelberg, Mississippi, in 1912 and continued practicing law there. In December 1915, he was elected to represent Jasper County as a Democrat in the Mississippi House of Representatives from 1916 to 1920. He was re-elected to serve from 1920 to 1924. He then represented Mississippi's 2nd senatorial district in the Mississippi State Senate from 1944 to 1948.
