= Tarbutton Creek =

- Location of the mouth within Missouri

Location
- Country: United States
- State: Missouri
- Region: Douglas County

Physical characteristics
- Source
  - coordinates: 37°00′19″N 92°27′49″W
- Mouth
  - coordinates: 36°56′52″N 92°30′14″W
  - elevation: 843 ft (257 m)

Tarbutton Creek is a stream in north central Douglas County in the Ozarks of southern Missouri.

The stream headwaters are just south of County road C-124 west of Missouri Route C. The stream flows south-southwest passing under Missouri Route 76 at Brushyknob where it turns southwest and flows parallel to Route 76 to its confluence with Bryant Creek about two miles north of Vera Cruz.

Tarbutton Creek has the name of the local Tarbutton family.

== See also ==
- List of rivers of Missouri
