= Glover Wilkins Lock =

Lock of the Tennessee-Tombigbee Waterway

Coordinates: 34°3′53.54″N 88°25′33.19″W

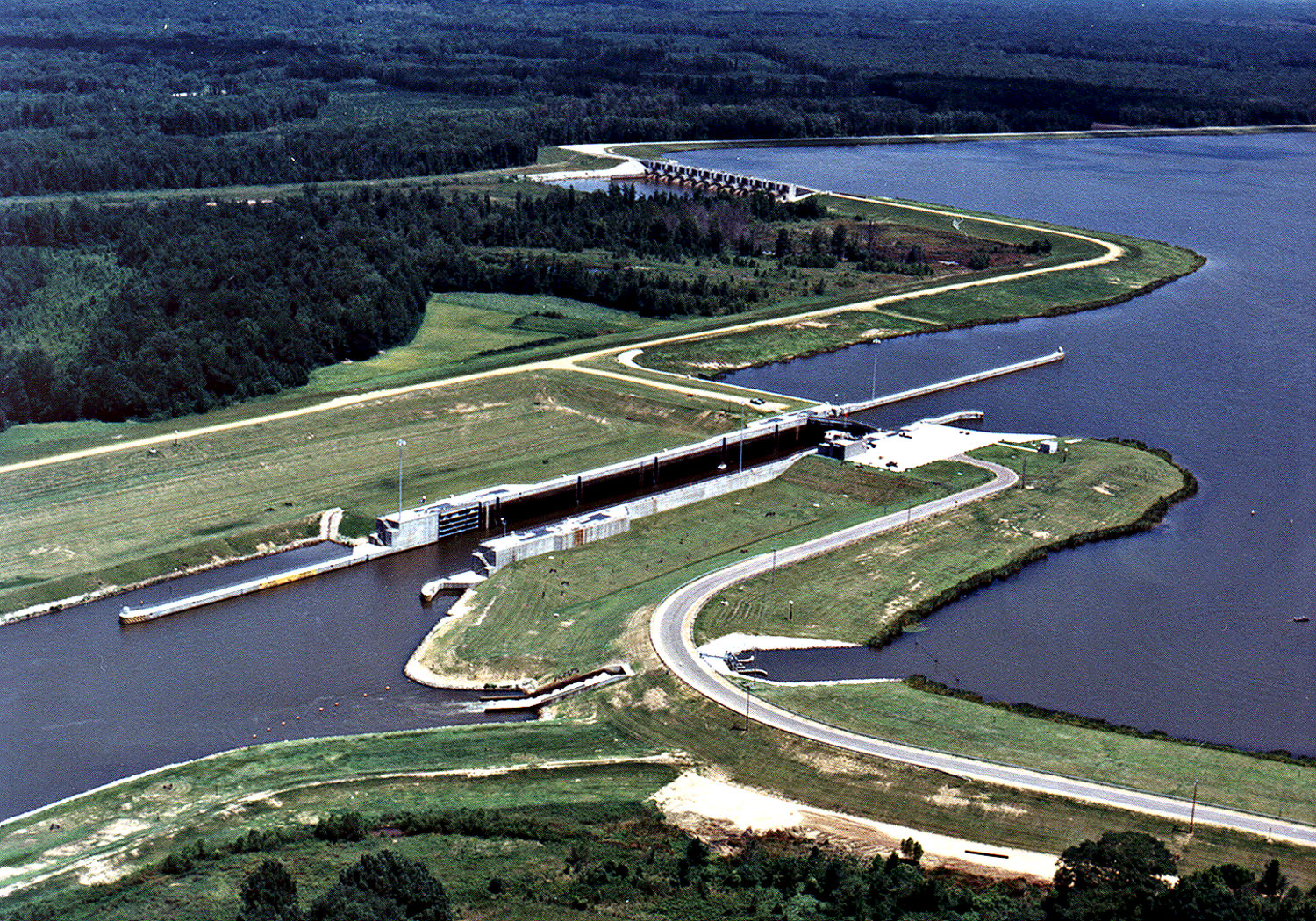
Glover Wilkins Lock and Dam on the Tennessee-Tombigbee Waterway at Smithville, Mississippi

The Glover Wilkins Lock (formerly named Lock B) is a lock of the Tennessee-Tombigbee Waterway. It is located close to Smithville, Mississippi. It was named for Glover Wilkins.
