= 2019 Ruston tornado =

2019 EF3 tornado in Louisiana, U.S.

- Damage to a QuikTrip in Ruston

Meteorological history
- Formed: April 25, 2019, 2:47 a.m. CST (UTC−06:00)
- Dissipated: April 25, 2019, 3:00 a.m. CST (UTC−06:00)
- Duration: 13 minutes

EF3 tornado
- on the Enhanced Fujita scale
- Highest winds: 145 mph (233 km/h)

Overall effects
- Fatalities: 2
- Injuries: 2
- Part of the Tornadoes of 2019

In the early morning hours of April 25, 2019, a large and destructive tornado moved through the western side of Ruston, a city located in the U.S. state of Louisiana. The tornado, which was on the ground for 11 miles (18 km), killed two people and heavily damaged portions of the Louisiana Tech University campus.

== Advanced forecasting ==
The Day 3 convective outlook, outlined by the Storm Prediction Center on April 23, saw a "slight", level 2-of-5 risk for severe weather across eastern Louisiana and southern Mississippi with an additional "marginal", level 1-of-5 risk stretching from East Texas to South Alabama. Meteorologist Chris Broyles noted that "thunderstorms associated with a marginal wind damage and hail threat will be possible across parts of the lower Mississippi Valley and central Gulf Coast States on Thursday".

The Day 2 convective outlook on April 24 maintained a slight risk area across the same areas as the day before. A 5% risk for tornadoes was noted, with a 15% total chance of significant severe weather occurring, including in New Orleans and Baton Rouge. The Day 1 convective outlook retained the marginal risk area over East Texas, Louisiana, South Arkansas and the Mississippi Delta, but had gotten rid of the slight risk region that had been outlined. A 2020 case study noted that the outlook did not properly anticipate the Ruston tornado's formation.

== Tornado summary ==
The tornado first touched down on Lafourche Avenue at 2:47 a.m. CDT, immediately uprooting softwood trees at EF1 intensity. More tree damage occurred as the tornado moved northeast, moving across Cypress Springs Avenue and Magnolia Drive. It reached EF2 intensity for the first time on Robinette Drive, where tree trunks were snapped. The tornado continued producing EF2-rated damage along Wade Drive and University Boulevard on the southwestern side of Ruston. Apartment buildings on the campus of Louisiana Tech University suffered roof damage as the tornado moved over a large portion of the college campus. Sports equipment was also damaged, and the J. C. Love Field at Pat Patterson Park was destroyed. After bending light poles at EF2 intensity along Louisiana Highway 150, the tornado moved over an apartment complex, where EF2-rated damage was inflicted to roofs. More tornadic damage occurred east of Ruston High School.

EF3 damage to buildings in downtown Ruston

More trees were uprooted to the northeast, before the tornado reached EF3 intensity. It cut a swath of EF3-rated tree and structure damage from Garr Avenue to U.S. Route 167. In this corridor, buildings suffered significant damage and the second-story walls of a motel collapsed. To the northeast the tornado passed over a shopping center, damaging storefronts and destroying roofs. after damaging a strip mall on Celebrity Drive the tornado weakened, overturning vehicles in a parking lot and later uprooting trees to the northeast. on East Kentucky Avenue the tornado collapsed a pole, and further northeast several trees were uprooted at EF1 intensity. Along Stable Road it again weakened, inflicting minor damage to tree branches. After passing over Louisiana Highway 820 the tornado briefly intensified, inflicting EF1-rated damage to a row of chicken houses. At 3:00 a.m, the tornado lifted on Honor Lane northwest of Sibley. It was on the ground for 11.32 miles (18.22 km), reaching a maximum width of 1,000 yards (910 m).

== Aftermath ==
Over 100 homes and businesses were damaged by the tornado, and 75% of Ruston was left without power.

Ruston Mayor Ronny Walker stated "You know, when it hits your hometown, when you see businesses, when you see student housing and everything damaged like it was, it was just, you know, a real shock". Lincoln Parish Homeland Security and Emergency Preparedness Director Kip Franklin remarked on residents of Lincoln Parish that "They come back. The people of Ruston came together. They stepped up and volunteered".

Two people, a mother and son, were killed by the tornado, when a tree fell on the home they were occupying.

== Other tornadoes ==
List of confirmed tornadoes – Thursday, April 25, 2019 (Note: All dates are based on the local time zone where the tornado touched down; however, all times are in Coordinated Universal Time for consistency.)
EF#	Location	County / Parish	State	Start Coord.	Time (UTC )	Path length	Max width	Summary
EF1	NNE of Lucky	Bienville	LA	32.2606°N 93.0064°W	06:12–06:15	2.52 mi (4.06 km)	150 yd (140 m)	Tree branches were broken off and about 20 trees were either snapped or uprooted. Power poles were snapped as well.
EF1	E of Bienville	Bienville	LA	32.3550°N 92.9253°W	06:25–06:26	1.03 mi (1.66 km)	200 yd (180 m)	This brief tornado snapped multiple power poles and downed 20 to 30 trees.
EF1	N of Downsville to E of Marion	Union	LA	32.6914°N 92.3973°W	07:10–07:33	21.37 mi (34.39 km)	850 yd (780 m)	A long-tracked tornado snapped or uprooted numerous trees, some of which caused severe structural damage to one home upon falling.
EF2	WNW of Beekman, LA to SSW of Hamburg, AR	Morehouse (LA), Ashley (AR)	LA, AR	32.9716°N 92.0133°W	07:44–08:01	15.99 mi (25.73 km)	2,000 yd (1,800 m)	A very large wedge tornado mowed down hundreds of trees along its path.
EF2	NW of Jena	La Salle	LA	31.6716°N 92.2606°W	07:59–08:14	8.77 mi (14.11 km)	700 yd (640 m)	Numerous trees were snapped or uprooted, some of which fell on a number of mobile homes as well as a church. A house had half of its roof ripped off and its carport completely demolished.
EF1	NW of Sugartown	Beauregard Vernon	LA	30.8626°N 93.1036°W	09:56–10:01	3.17 mi (5.10 km)	500 yd (460 m)	Numerous trees were snapped or uprooted. One home had some of its roofing ripped off.
EF1	S of Kiln	Hancock	MS	30.3935°N 89.4453°W	16:22–16:23	0.25 mi (0.40 km)	25 yd (23 m)	Numerous trees were snapped or uprooted.
EF0	S of Little Texas	Tunica	MS	34.5659°N 90.2685°W	22:25–22:26	0.19 mi (0.31 km)	50 yd (46 m)	A brief landspout tornado caused no damage.
EF1	S of North Vernon	Jennings	IN	38.9213°N 85.609°W	23:19–23:21	0.33 mi (0.53 km)	30 yd (27 m)	A garage was destroyed, and several of its concrete anchors were ripped out of the garage foundation. A trailer was flipped and rolled 5 yd (4.6 m), and two cars were pushed short distances, one of which had a window blown out. A glass patio table was tossed and damaged, and a home sustained substantial loss of roofing. The underside of the roof of its north facing front porch was blown out with insulation debris caked on the north and east sides of the house. A wicker chair from the front porch was tossed, and two logs were impaled through the windshield of a nearby SUV.
EF0	ENE of Standing Pine	Leake	MS	32.6864°N 89.34°W	23:36–23:39	1.35 mi (2.17 km)	25 yd (23 m)	A senior care facility was damaged, as well as a barn, shed, and a fence and scoreboard at a baseball field.
EF1	NE of North Vernon	Jennings	IN	39.1322°N 85.4821°W	23:52–23:53	0.05 mi (0.080 km)	30 yd (27 m)	Several trees were snapped and uprooted.
EF0	W of Greenville	Darke	OH	40.0945°N 84.7771°W	02:07–02:09	0.99 mi (1.59 km)	80 yd (73 m)	A residence suffered roof damage, with pieces of wood and siding ripped from the porch and tossed about 150 yd (140 m). Several rotten trees were uprooted. Another house and some outbuildings sustained minor roof damage.

== See also ==
- List of United States tornadoes in April 2019
- Tornado outbreak of February 7, 2017, which featured an EF3 tornado in New Orleans
