= Brushyknob, Missouri =

- Community
- Location of Brushyknob, Missouri Brushyknob, Missouri (the United States)
- Coordinates: 36°57′53″N 92°29′10″W
- Country: United States
- State: Missouri
- County: Douglas County
- Elevation: 922 ft (281 m)
- Time zone: UTC-6 (CST)
  - Summer (DST): UTC-5 (CDT)
- Zip Code: 65621 (historical)
- GNIS feature ID: 740700

Brushyknob is an unincorporated community in Douglas County, Missouri, United States. The community is located on Route 76, approximately fourteen miles east of Ava. The old townsite is located along Route 76 on Tarbutton Creek, about 1.5 miles east of Bryant Creek at an elevation of 920 feet. The Brushyknob church and cemetery is on a ridge flat about 3500 feet to the south-southeast and some 200 feet higher in elevation. The historic Brushyknob school is 850 feet south of the church.

It previously had a post office (ZIP code was 65621) from 1903 to 1967, but mail is now served by the post office in Ava.
