= Polkville, Mississippi =

- Town
- Location of Polkville, Mississippi

- Location in the United States
- Coordinates: 32°11′47″N 89°41′42″W
- Country: United States
- State: Mississippi
- County: Smith

Area
  - Total: 17.17 sq mi (44.48 km^{2})
  - Land: 17.17 sq mi (44.48 km^{2})
  - Water: 0 sq mi (0.00 km^{2})
- Elevation: 512 ft (156 m)

Population (2020)
  - Total: 588
  - Density: 34.2/sq mi (13.22/km^{2})
- Time zone: UTC-6 (Central (CST))
  - Summer (DST): UTC-5 (CDT)
- FIPS code: 28-58960
- GNIS feature ID: 0694449
- Website: www.polkville.org

Polkville is a town in Smith County, Mississippi. As of the 2020 census, Polkville had a population of 588.

== History ==
Polkville was named for President James K. Polk. In 1900, Polkville had a population of 45. A post office operated under the name Polkville from 1845 to 1974.

== Geography ==
Polkville is located at 32°11′47″N 89°41′42″W (32.196288, -89.695080).

According to the United States Census Bureau, the village has a total area of 2.3 square miles (6.0 km^{2}), all land.

== Demographics ==
Historical population
Census	Pop.	Note	%±
1970	166		—
1980	129		−22.3%
1990	129		0.0%
2000	132		2.3%
2010	833		531.1%
2020	588		−29.4%
U.S. Decennial Census

As of the census of 2000, there were 132 people, 51 households, and 39 families residing in the Town. The population density was 57.0 inhabitants per square mile (22.0/km^{2}). There were 62 housing units at an average density of 26.8 per square mile (10.3/km^{2}). The racial makeup of the town was 90.91% White and 9.09% African American. Polkville annexed nearly 14 square miles (36 km^{2}) of land later, bringing its population to 833 people. This also made it the largest municipal town in Smith County.

There were 51 households, of which 31.4% had children under the age of 18 living with them, 70.6% were married couples living together, 3.9% had a female householder with no husband present, and 23.5% were non-families. 21.6% of all households were made up of individuals, and 9.8% had someone living alone who was 65 years of age or older. The average household size was 2.59 and the average family size was 3.03.

In the village the population was spread out, with 25.0% under the age of 18, 6.1% from 18 to 24, 31.1% from 25 to 44, 21.2% from 45 to 64, and 16.7% who were 65 years of age or older. The median age was 40 years. For every 100 females, there were 106.3 males. For every 100 females age 18 and over, there were 106.3 males.

The median income for a household in the village was $39,375, and the median income for a family was $48,750. Males had a median income of $35,625 versus $16,250 for females. The per capita income for the village was $18,056. There were 2.8% of families and 6.3% of the population living below the poverty line, including none under 18 and 10.3% of those over 64.

The Census 2010 records the population of Polkville as 833. Polkville officially changed its name to the Town of Polkville in 2007.

== Education ==
The Town of Polkville is served by the Smith County School District.

== Notable people ==
- Henry Lloyd Finch, former member of the Mississippi Senate and Mississippi House of Representatives
