= Shottsville, Alabama =

Unincorporated community in Alabama, United States

- Unincorporated community
- Location within Alabama Location within the United States
- Coordinates: 34°15′39″N 88°07′38″W
- Country: United States
- State: Alabama
- County: Marion
- Elevation: 489 ft (149 m)
- Time zone: UTC-6 (Central (CST))
  - Summer (DST): UTC-5 (CDT)
- Area codes: 205, 659
- GNIS feature ID: 126823

Shottsville is an unincorporated community in Marion County, in the U.S. state of Alabama, located 15 miles northwest of Hamilton.

== History ==
Shottsville is named for Lovid McCindry Shotts (b. 1818), who settled in the area in 1839 and who became the town's first postmaster in 1874. The post office operated under the name Shottsville from 1874 to 1905. Prior to being given the name Shottsville, the town was known locally by the name "Stone Town," so-called for the large number of residents in the region who bore the surname Stone.

On April 27, 2011, the town was hit by the Smithville, Mississippi EF5 tornado. After crossing the state line, it produced EF3 damage in the community.
