= Glover Wilkins =

American administrator (d. 1991)

Glover Wilkins (d. 1991) was a long-time administrator of the Tennessee-Tombigbee Waterway Development Authority. One of the canal locks was named in his honor in 1997.
