= List of tornado emergencies =

Since its initial usage in May 1999, the National Weather Service (NWS) in the United States has used the tornado emergency bulletin — a high-end classification of tornado warning — sent through either the issuance of a warning or via a "severe weather statement" that provides updated information on an ongoing warning—that is issued when a violent tornado (confirmed by radar or ground observation) is expected to impact a heavily populated area, and pose a significant threat to life and property. The tornado emergency wording is issued when reliable sources confirm an ongoing tornado with a catastrophic risk to life and property.

To date, a total of 201 (316 unofficially) known tornado emergencies have been issued by the NWS through its local Weather Forecast Offices; all but 16 of these have resulted in a confirmed tornado, with the resulting tornadoes being responsible for a total of 554 fatalities. Currently, the 2011 Super Outbreak holds the all-time record for the most tornado emergencies issued during a 24-hour period, with a cumulative total of 16 issued (between four local NWS Weather Forecast Offices (WFO) serving the southeastern United States) during the outbreak event.

Below is a listing of each individual emergency that has been issued since the terminology was introduced. The individual tornado emergencies are listed based on the specific cities or areas involved, the counties these areas are in, and the states the counties are in. Individual tornado events that had multiple emergencies issued for them are grouped together by the tornadoes' injuries, fatalities and references. Tornado emergencies issued for multiple recorded tornadoes will be displayed with all tornadoes within the emergency section, often grouped by the date of occurrence. All the tornadoes listed occurred between the time the tornado emergency was issued to the time the tornado warning expired.

== List ==
=== 1999–2009 ===
Year	Date	Cities	Counties or Parishes	States	F/EF#	Deaths	Injuries	Event link	Refs
1999	May 3	South Oklahoma City, Moore	Oklahoma, Cleveland	Oklahoma	F5	36	583	1999 Bridge Creek–Moore tornado	
2000	March 28	Fort Worth	Tarrant	Texas	F3	2	80	2000 Fort Worth tornado outbreak	
2000	June 13	Perryton	Ochiltree	Texas	F0	0	0	Tornadoes of 2000#June	
2002	May 7	Pratt	Pratt	Kansas	F2	0	0	Tornadoes of 2002#May 7	
2002	September 20	Bargersville, Greenwood, Homecroft, Beech Grove, Indianapolis	Northern Johnson, Marion	Indiana	F3	0	127	Tornadoes of 2002#September 20	
2002	September 20	Cumberland, Spring Lake, Mccordsville	Hancock	Indiana	F3	0	127	Tornadoes of 2002#September 20	
2002	November 10	Bazemore, Glen Allen	Fayette	Alabama	F3	4	38	2002 Veterans Day weekend tornado outbreak	
2002	November 10	Eldridge, Carbon Hill, Nauvoo	Northwest Walker, Southeast Marion	Alabama	F3	4	38	2002 Veterans Day weekend tornado outbreak	
2002	November 10	Arley, Double Springs, Lynn, Natural Bridge, Poplar Springs, Addison	Winston	Alabama	F3	4	38	2002 Veterans Day weekend tornado outbreak	
2002	November 10	Baileyton, Bremen, Cullman, Fairview, Good Hope, Holly Pond, Logan	Cullman	Alabama	F3	7	53	2002 Veterans Day weekend tornado outbreak	
2003	May 4	Northern Kansas City Metro, Platte City	Northern Platte, Leavenworth	Missouri, Kansas	F2	0	2	Tornado outbreak sequence of May 2003	
2003	May 6	Gurley, Hazel Green, Meridianville, Moores Mill, Huntsville, New Market	Madison	Alabama	F1	0	0	Tornado outbreak sequence of May 2003	
2003	May 6	Meridianville, Skyline, Stevenson	Madison, Jackson	Alabama	F1	0	0	Tornado outbreak sequence of May 2003	
2003	May 6	Skyline, Estillfork, Stevenson	Jackson	Alabama	F0	0	0	Tornado outbreak sequence of May 2003	
2003	May 7	Gattman, Greenwood Springs, Quincy	Monroe	Mississippi	F2	0	6	Tornado outbreak sequence of May 2003	
2003	May 7	Gattman, Greenwood Springs, Quincy	Monroe	Mississippi	F2	0	6	Tornado outbreak sequence of May 2003	
2003	May 7	Ashland	Clay	Alabama	F0	0	0	Tornado outbreak sequence of May 2003	
2003	May 7	Lincoln, Pell City	St. Clair, Northern Talladega	Alabama	F0	0	0	Tornado outbreak sequence of May 2003	
2003	May 7	Wedowee	Randolph	Alabama	F0	0	0	Tornado outbreak sequence of May 2003	
2003	May 7	Ashland	Clay	Alabama	F0	0	0	Tornado outbreak sequence of May 2003	
2003	May 7	Lincoln, Anniston, Blue Mountain, Oxford, West End-Cobb Town	Northern Talladega, Calhoun	Alabama	—N/a	0	0	Tornado outbreak sequence of May 2003	
2003	May 7	Wedowee	Randolph	Alabama	F1	0	0	Tornado outbreak sequence of May 2003	
2003	May 7	Corinth, Wedowee	Randolph	Alabama	—N/a	0	0	Tornado outbreak sequence of May 2003	
2003	May 7	Roanoke	Randolph	Alabama	—N/a	0	0	Tornado outbreak sequence of May 2003	
2003	May 7	Five Points, Lanett, Milltown	Chambers	Alabama	—N/a	0	0	Tornado outbreak sequence of May 2003	
2003	May 8	Moore, Southeast Oklahoma City, Tinker Air Force Base, Midwest City, Choctaw, Harrah, General Motors Plant	Cleveland, McClain, Oklahoma	Oklahoma	F4	0	134	Tornado outbreak sequence of May 2003	
2003	May 9	Western Oklahoma City, Bethany, Warr Acres, Mustang, Wiley Post Airport, Lake Hefner, The Village, Nichols Hills, Baptist Medical Center, Along Northwest Expressway, Along Lake Hefner Parkway, Edmond	Southeast Canadian, Oklahoma	Oklahoma	F1	0	8	Tornado outbreak sequence of May 2003	
2003	May 9	Western Oklahoma City, Bethany, Warr Acres, Mustang, Wiley Post Airport, Lake Hefner, The Village, Nichols Hills, Baptist Medical Center, Along Northwest Expressway, Along Lake Hefner Parkway, Edmond	Southeast Canadian, Oklahoma	Oklahoma	F1	0	0	Tornado outbreak sequence of May 2003	
2003	May 9	North Oklahoma City, Edmond, Along Broadway Extension, Spencer, Arcadia Lake, Along Turner Turnpike east of Interstate 35, Jones, Luther	Oklahoma	Oklahoma	F3	0	2	Tornado outbreak sequence of May 2003	
2004	October 18	Paris, Springville	Henry	Tennessee	F1	0	1	Tornadoes of 2004#October 18–19	
2004	October 18	Friendship, Eaton, Alamo, Trenton, Gadsden, Humboldt	Crockett, Gibson	Tennessee	F1	0	1	Tornadoes of 2004#October 18–19	
2005	April 6	Brandon, Pelahatchie, Leesburg, Forkville	Rankin	Mississippi	F3	0	6	Tornadoes of 2005#April 5–7	
2005	April 6	Leesburg, Mississippi, Forkville	Northeastern Rankin, Northwestern Scott	Mississippi	F1	0	0	Tornadoes of 2005#April 5–7	
2005	August 19	Great Bend	Southwestern Barton	Kansas	F0	0	0	Tornadoes of 2005#August	
2005	August 19	Great Bend	Southwestern Barton	Kansas	F1	0	0	Tornadoes of 2005#August	
2006	March 12	Southern Sedalia, Smithson	Eastern Pettis	Missouri	F1	0	0	Tornado outbreak sequence of March 9–13, 2006	
2006	March 12	Southern Sedalia, Smithson	Eastern Pettis	Missouri	F2	1	6	Tornado outbreak sequence of March 9–13, 2006	
2006	March 12	Stockton	Cedar	Missouri	F0	0	0	Tornado outbreak sequence of March 9–13, 2006	
2006	March 12	South Springfield	Southern Greene	Missouri	F3	1	8	Tornado outbreak sequence of March 9–13, 2006	
2006	March 12	Table Rock Lake	Southern Stone	Missouri	F1	0	0	Tornado outbreak sequence of March 9–13, 2006	
2006	March 12	Rogersville, Duncan	Southern & East Central Webster, West Central Wright	Missouri	F2	0	13	Tornado outbreak sequence of March 9–13, 2006	
2006	March 12	Rogersville, Duncan	Southern & East Central Webster, West Central Wright	Missouri	F3	0	0	Tornado outbreak sequence of March 9–13, 2006	
2006	March 12	Duncan	Wright	Missouri	F3	0	0	Tornado outbreak sequence of March 9–13, 2006	
2006	March 30	Sedalia	Northern Pettis	Missouri	F1	1	0	Tornadoes of 2006#March 30–31	
2006	April 2	Beech Grove, Lafe	Greene	Arkansas	F3	2	177	Tornado outbreak of April 2, 2006	
2006	April 2	Rector, Kennett, Dunklin County Airport	Dunklin	Missouri	F3	2	177	Tornado outbreak of April 2, 2006	
2006	April 2	Caruthersville	Pemiscot	Missouri	F3	2	177	Tornado outbreak of April 2, 2006	
2006	April 7	Huntsville International Airport, Huntsville, Mooresville, Trianna, Madison, Redstone Arsenal, Haden, Hampton Cove, Big Cove	Southern Madison, Southeast Limestone	Alabama	F0	0	0	Tornado outbreak of April 6–8, 2006	
2007	March 28	McLean	Central Gray	Texas	EF2	0	0	Tornado outbreak of March 28–31, 2007	
2007	May 4	Greensburg	Central Kiowa	Kansas	EF5	11	63	Greensburg tornado	
2007	May 4	Greensburg	Central Kiowa	Kansas	EF1	0	0	Greensburg tornado	
2007	May 4	Greensburg	Central Kiowa	Kansas	EF1	0	0	Greensburg tornado	
2007	May 4	Greensburg	Central Kiowa	Kansas	EF1	0	0	Greensburg tornado	
2007	May 4	Greensburg	Central Kiowa	Kansas	EF0	0	0	Greensburg tornado	
2007	May 4	Greensburg	Central Kiowa	Kansas	EF0	0	0	Greensburg tornado	
2007	May 4	Greensburg	Central Kiowa	Kansas	EF0	0	0	Greensburg tornado	
2007	May 4	Greensburg	Central Kiowa	Kansas	EF0	0	0	Greensburg tornado	
2007	May 4	Greensburg	Central Kiowa	Kansas	EF0	0	0	Greensburg tornado	
2007	May 5	Great Bend	Southern Barton	Kansas	EF1	0	0	Tornado outbreak of May 4–6, 2007	
2007	May 5	Great Bend	Southern Barton	Kansas	EF1	0	0	Tornado outbreak of May 4–6, 2007	
2007	October 18	Nappanee, Foraker, Goshen, New Paris, Millersburg, Waterford Mills, Gravelton	Southern Elkhart	Indiana	EF3	0	8	Tornado outbreak of October 17–19, 2007	
2008	January 7	Springfield, Bassville	Eastern Greene	Missouri	EF3	3	18	Tornado outbreak sequence of January 7–11, 2008	
2008	February 5	Lynchburg, Horn Lake, Southaven, Whitehaven, Southwest Memphis, Downtown Memphis, Olive Branch, Midtown Memphis, Southeast Memphis, Frayser, Germantown, Collierville, Bartlett, Ellendale, Millington, Lakeland, Eads, Arlington, Somerville, Oakland, Gallaway	Shelby, Northern Fayette, DeSoto	Mississippi, Tennessee	EF2	3	13	2008 Super Tuesday tornado outbreak	
2008	February 5	Jackson, Cedar Grove, Bargerton, Atwood, Middle Fork, Trezevant, Parker's Cross Roads McLemoresville, Wildersville, Clarksburg, Huntingdon, Buena Vista, Hollow Rock, Vale, Bruceton, Springville	Northeastern Madison, Northern Henderson, Southeastern Gibson, Carroll, South Central Henry	Tennessee	EF3	3	14	2008 Super Tuesday tornado outbreak	
2008	February 5	Jackson, Cedar Grove, Bargerton, Atwood, Middle Fork, Trezevant, Parker's Cross Roads McLemoresville, Wildersville, Clarksburg, Huntingdon, Buena Vista, Hollow Rock, Vale, Bruceton, Springville	Northeastern Madison, Northern Henderson, Southeastern Gibson, Carroll, South Central Henry	Tennessee	EF4	0	51	2008 Super Tuesday tornado outbreak	
2008	February 6	Decatur, Priceville, Mooresville, Belle Mina,	Southeastern Limestone, Northwestern Morgan	Alabama	EF4	4	23	2008 Super Tuesday tornado outbreak	
2008	February 17	Elmore, Bob Woodruff Lake, Speigner, Wetumpka, Wallsboro, Ten Cedar Estates, Dexter	Elmore, Eastern Autagua, Northwestern Montgomery	Alabama	EF3	0	50	Tornadoes of 2008#February 16–18	
2008	March 15	Six Flags, Atlanta, Hapeville, Turner Field, Piedmont Park, Grant Park	Central Fulton, South Central Cobb, Northern Douglas	Georgia	—N/a	0	0	Tornado outbreak of March 14–15, 2008	
2008	April 4	Ridgeland, Fannin, Goshen Springs, Pisgah, Leesburg, Branch, Morton, Forkville, Pelahatchie	South Central Madison, Western Scott, Northern Rankin, Extreme Northeastern Hinds	Mississippi	EF2	0	20 (+1 indirect)	Tornadoes of 2008#April 3–5	
2008	April 9	Breckenridge	Stephens	Texas	EF1	0	6	Tornadoes of 2008#April 8–11	
2008	July 11	Mahkonce, Pine Bend	Southern Mahnomen	Minnesota	EF2	0	0	Tornadoes of 2008#July 7–11 (North America)	
2008	December 9	Yazoo City, Benton, Midway, Eden, Coxburg, Tolarville, Brozville, Ebenezer, Franklin	Northern Yazoo, Southwestern Holmes	Mississippi	EF2	0	0	Tornadoes of 2008#December 9–11	
2009	February 18	Saks, Oxford, Fort McClellan, Cobb Town, Anniston, Heflin	St. Clair, Calhoun, Clay, Cleburne, Randolph, Talladega	Alabama	—N/a	0	0	Tornadoes of 2009#February 18	
2009	February 18	Jacksonville, Fort McClellan, Edwardsville, Fruithurst, Muscadine	Calhoun, Cleburne	Alabama	—N/a	0	0	Tornadoes of 2009#February 18	
2009	April 10	Murfreesboro	Wilson, Rutherford, Cannon	Tennessee	EF4	2	58	Tornado outbreak of April 9–11, 2009	
2009	June 17	Aurora	Hamilton	Nebraska	EF2	0	0	Tornadoes of 2009#June 17	

=== 2010–2019 ===
Year	Date	Cities	Counties or Parishes	States	F/EF#	Deaths	Injuries	Event link	Refs
2010	March 28	Southeastern Forsyth County, Guilford County, northeastern Davidson County, northern Randolph County	Forsyth, Davidson, Randolph, Guilford	North Carolina	EF3	0	0	Tornado outbreak of March 28–29, 2010	
2010	April 24	Yazoo County, Attala County, Holmes County, Madison County, Issaquena County, Sharkey County, Warren County, Choctaw County, Oktibbeha County	Yazoo, Attala, Holmes, Madison, Issaquena, Sharkey, Warren, Choctaw, Oktibbeha	Mississippi	EF4	10	146	2010 Yazoo City tornado	
2010	April 24	Southwestern Blount County, east central Walker County, north central Jefferson County	Blount, Walker, Jefferson	Alabama	EF3	0	45	Tornado outbreak of April 22–25, 2010	
2010	June 5	Peoria	Peoria, Tazewell, Woodford	Illinois	EF2	0	0	Tornado outbreak of June 5–6, 2010	
2010	June 17	Sebeka, Nimrod	Wadena, Hubbard, Becker, Clearwater, Otter Tail	Minnesota	EF4	0	20	2010 Wadena tornado	
2010	June 17	Plummer, Highlanding	Mahnomen, Red Lake, Pennington, Marshall, Polk, Clearwater	Minnesota	EF3	1	0	June 2010 Northern Plains tornado outbreak	
2010	June 17	Yellow Lake	Washburn, Burnett, Pine	Minnesota, Wisconsin	EF2	0	2	June 2010 Northern Plains tornado outbreak	
2010	August 12	Lidgerwood	Sargent, Richland	North Dakota	EF0	0	0	Tornadoes of 2010#August 12	
2010	October 24	Columbia	Maury	Tennessee	—N/a	0	0	October 2010 North American storm complex	
2010	December 31	Richland, Jackson, Pearl, Flowood, Brandon	Rankin, Hinds	Mississippi	EF2	0	0	2010 New Year's Eve tornado outbreak	
2011	February 24	Mt. Juliet, Lebanon	Wilson, Rutherford	Tennessee	EF2	0	0	Tornadoes of 2011#February 24 (United States)	
2011	February 24	Mt. Juliet, Lebanon	Wilson, Rutherford	Tennessee	EF2	0	2	Tornadoes of 2011#February 24 (United States)	
2011	February 28	Tullahoma	Moore, Franklin	Tennessee	EF2	1	4	Tornadoes of 2011#February 27–28 (United States)	
2011	April 15	Jackson, Ridgeland, Madison	Madison, Hinds	Mississippi	EF3	0	10	Tornado outbreak of April 14–16, 2011	
2011	April 15	Goshen Springs, Pisgah	Madison, Rankin	Mississippi	EF1	0	0	Tornado outbreak of April 14–16, 2011	
2011	April 15	Geiger, Panola, Pleasant Ridge, Clinton, Union	Greene, Sumter	Alabama	EF3	0	0	Tornado outbreak of April 14–16, 2011	
2011	April 15	McIntosh, Deer Park	Washington	Alabama	EF3	3	3	Tornado outbreak of April 14–16, 2011	
2011	April 16	Apex, Carpenter, Cary, Morrisville, Garner, Raleigh, Holly Springs, Knightdale, Rolesville	Durham, Wake, Chatham, Lee, Harnett, Nash, Franklin	North Carolina	EF3	6	103	Tornado outbreak of April 14–16, 2011	
2011	April 16	Benson, Four Oaks, Smithfield, Selma, Pine Level, Princeton, Micro, Kenly	Sampson, Harnett, Johnston	North Carolina	EF3	1	101	Tornado outbreak of April 14–16, 2011	
2011	April 16	Louisburg, Centerville, Littleton	Nash, Franklin, Halifax, Warren	North Carolina	EF2	0	0	Tornado outbreak of April 14–16, 2011	
2011	April 16	Salemburg, Clinton, Turkey	Cumberland, Sampson	North Carolina	EF2	0	13	Tornado outbreak of April 14–16, 2011	
2011	April 16	Micro, Kenly, Lucama	Johnston, Wilson, Nash	North Carolina	EF1	0	0	Tornado outbreak of April 14–16, 2011	
2011	April 16	Micro, Kenly, Lucama	Johnston, Wilson, Nash	North Carolina	EF2	0	10	Tornado outbreak of April 14–16, 2011	
2011	April 25	Vilonia, Romance	Cleburne, White, Faulkner, Lonoke	Arkansas	EF1	0	0	2011 Super Outbreak	
2011	April 25	Vilonia, Romance	Cleburne, White, Faulkner, Lonoke	Arkansas	EF2	4	15	2011 Super Outbreak	
2011	April 27	Philadelphia, Vernon, Gholson, Mashulaville, Shuqualak, Scooba, Macon, Brooksville, Deerbrook, Bigbee Valley	Neshoba, Kemper, Noxubee, Winston	Mississippi	EF5	3	6	2011 Philadelphia, Mississippi tornado	
2011	April 27	Kemper County, Geiger, Panola	Kemper, Tuscaloosa, Pickens, Greene, Hale, Sumter	Mississippi, Alabama	EF3	0	0	2011 Super Outbreak	
2011	April 27	Southeastern Noxubee County	Noxubee	Mississippi	EF1	0	0	2011 Super Outbreak	
2011	April 27	Chunky, Little Rock, Duffee	Scott, Newton, Smith	Mississippi	EF3	0	0	2011 Super Outbreak	
2011	April 27	Chunky, Little Rock, Duffee	Scott, Newton, Smith	Mississippi	EF3	1	0	2011 Super Outbreak	
2011	April 27	Montrose, Garlandville, Rose Hill, Orange	Newton, Jasper	Mississippi	EF4	2	0	2011 Super Outbreak	
2011	April 27	Stonewall, Zero, Middleton, Sykes, Increase, Alamucha	Clarke, Lauderdale	Mississippi	EF4	4	14	2011 Super Outbreak	
2011	April 27	Reform, Lubbub, New Lexington, Concord, Sandtown, Southern Berry, Boley Springs, Pleasant Ridge, Oakman, Parrish, Dora, Sumiton, Cleveland, Blountsville, Oneonta, Sipsey, Arkadelphia, Kimberly, Albertville, Hustleville, Chigger Hill, Douglas, Horton, Boaz, Crossville, Hopewell, Geraldine	Pickens, Tuscaloosa, Walker, Fayette, Blount, Jefferson, DeKalb, Marshall	Alabama	EF4	13	54	2011 Super Outbreak	
2011	April 27	Ralph, Fosters, Taylorville, Tuscaloosa, Brookwood, Abernant, North Johns, McCalla, Hueytown, Bessemer, Fairfield, Birmingham Metro, Minor	Pickens, Greene, Tuscaloosa, Jefferson, Shelby	Alabama	EF4	64	1,500	2011 Tuscaloosa–Birmingham tornado	
2011	April 27	Sawyerville, North Greensboro, Eoline, North Centreville, Six Mile, Marvel, Montevallo, Maylene, Alabaster, Southern Helena, Southern Pelham, Chelsea	Tuscaloosa, Bibb, Hale, Perry, Chilton, Shelby, Talladega	Alabama	EF3	7	52	2011 Sawyerville–Eoline tornado	
2011	April 27	Rainbow City, Glencoe, Hokes Bluff, Southeastern Etowah County, Northern Calhoun County, Ellisville, Spring Garden, Cherokee County	Blount, Calhoun, Etowah, St. Clair, Cherokee	Alabama	EF4	22	85	2011 Shoal Creek Valley–Ohatchee tornado	
2011	April 27	Wind Creek State Park, Dadeville, Camp Hill, White Plains, Penton	Chambers, Elmore, Lee, Tallapoosa	Alabama	EF4	7	30	2011 Super Outbreak	
2011	April 27	Northern Cullman County, Southeastern Morgan County, Baileyton, Ryan Crossroads, Eddy, Union Grove, Guntersville, Morgan City, New Hope, Owens Crossroads, Grant, Woodville, Lim Rock, Section, Langston	Cullman, Morgan, Madison, Marshall, Jackson	Alabama	EF4	6	48	2011 Cullman–Arab tornado	
2011	April 27	Hackleburg, Belgreen, Phil Campbell, Spruce Pine, Russellville, Pleasant Ridge, Littleville, Spring Valley, Landersville, Tanner, Athens, Capshaw, Harvest, Toney, Meridianville, Plevna, Moores Mill, Hazel Green, Lincoln, New Market, Flintville, Elora, Huntland, Belvidere, Decherd, Cowan, Sherwood, Sewanee, Winchester	Colbert, Franklin, Lawrence, Limestone, Madison, Morgan, Jackson, Lincoln (TN), Franklin	Alabama, Tennessee	EF5	71	145	2011 Hackleburg–Phil Campbell tornado	
2011	April 27	Joppa, New Hope, Grant	Madison, Marshall	Alabama	—N/a	0	0	2011 Super Outbreak	
2011	April 27	Huntsville, Meridianville, Moores Mill, Princeton, Francisco, Hytop	Madison, Jackson, Franklin	Alabama, Tennessee	—N/a	0	0	2011 Super Outbreak	
2011	April 27	Geraldine, Fyffe, Guest, Shiloh, Powell, Rainsville, Dog Town, Pine Ridge, Fort Payne, Sylvania, Adamsburg, Henagar, Hammondville, Valley Head, Mentone, Beaty Crossroads, Ider, Sulphur Springs	DeKalb, Jackson, Marshall	Alabama	EF5	25	Unknown	2011 Rainsville tornado	
2011	April 27	Geraldine, Fyffe, Guest, Shiloh, Powell, Rainsville, Dog Town, Pine Ridge, Fort Payne, Sylvania, Adamsburg, Henagar, Hammondville, Valley Head, Mentone, Beaty Crossroads, Ider, Sulphur Springs	DeKalb, Jackson, Marshall	Alabama	EF2	0	0	2011 Super Outbreak	
2011	May 22	Harmony	Fillmore	Minnesota	EF2	0	1	Tornado outbreak sequence of May 21–26, 2011	
2012	January 22	West central Lincoln County, southwestern Jefferson County, northern Cleveland County	Lincoln, Jefferson, Cleveland	Arkansas	EF2	0	0	Tornadoes of 2012#January 22–23 (United States)	
2012	January 23	Chilton County	Coosa, Chilton	Alabama	EF2	0	0	Tornadoes of 2012#January 22–23 (United States)	
2012	January 23	Clay, Springville, Argo	Blount, Calhoun, Etowah, Jefferson, St. Clair	Alabama	EF3	1	75	2012 Center Point–Clay tornado	
2012	March 2	Little Sandy, Sandy Hook, Isonville	Elliott, Morgan, Rowan	Kentucky	EF3	0	0	Tornado outbreak of March 2–3, 2012	
2012	March 2	Jamestown	Pickett, Overton, Fentress	Tennessee	EF0	0	0	Tornado outbreak of March 2–3, 2012	
2012	March 2	Northern Madison County, Meridianville	Lincoln, Franklin, Madison, Jackson	Alabama, Tennessee	EF2	0	0	Tornado outbreak of March 2–3, 2012	
2012	March 2	Gallatin County, Carroll County, Ripley County, Dearborn County, Ohio County, Switzerland County	Gallatin, Carroll, Ripley, Dearborn, Ohio, Switzerland	Kentucky, Indiana	EF1	0	0	Tornado outbreak of March 2–3, 2012	
2012	March 2	Carrollton, Vevay, Warsaw	Boone, Carroll, Gallatin, Grant, Owen, Switzerland	Kentucky, Indiana	EF2	0	3	Tornado outbreak of March 2–3, 2012	
2012	March 2	Northern Gallatin County, Boone County, Kenton County, Switzerland County	Northern Gallatin, Boone, Kenton, Switzerland	Kentucky, Indiana	EF4	4	8	Tornado outbreak of March 2–3, 2012	
2012	March 2	Campton, Salyersville, Paintsville, Riceville, Van Lear	Breathitt, Floyd, Johnson, Lee, Magoffin, Morgan, Wolfe, Martin	Kentucky	EF3	2	37	Tornado outbreak of March 2–3, 2012	
2012	March 2	Laurel County	Laurel	Kentucky	EF2	6	40	Tornado outbreak of March 2–3, 2012	
2012	March 2	New Liberty, Henryville, Marysville, Lexington	Clark, Scott, Jefferson, Trimble	Indiana, Kentucky	EF4	11	6	2012 Henryville tornado	
2012	March 2	Wellington, Arnett, West Liberty, Index, Elamton	Elliott, Bath, Rowan, Morgan, Menifee, Johnson, Wolfe, Magoffin, Martin	Kentucky	EF3	10	89	Tornado outbreak of March 2–3, 2012	
2012	April 3	Lancaster, Dallas, Hutchins, Garland, Mesquite	Dallas	Texas	EF2	0	10	Tornado outbreak of April 3, 2012	
2012	April 3	Arlington, Pantego	Tarrant, Dallas	Texas	EF2	0	8	Tornado outbreak of April 3, 2012	
2012	April 14	Macksville	Edwards, Stafford, Pawnee, Pratt	Kansas	EF3	0	0	Tornado outbreak of April 13–16, 2012	
2012	April 14	Wichita	Butler, Sedgwick	Kansas	EF3	0	38	Tornado outbreak of April 13–16, 2012	
2012	April 14	Conway Springs	Sumner	Kansas	EF3	0	0	Tornado outbreak of April 13–16, 2012	
2012	December 25	Mobile	Mobile, Baldwin	Alabama	EF2	0	1	Late December 2012 North American storm complex	
2013	February 10	Hattiesburg	Lamar, Forrest	Mississippi	EF4	0	82	2013 Hattiesburg tornado	
2013	April 10	Clinton	Van Buren, Stone, Searcy, Conway	Arkansas	EF2	0	5	Tornadoes of 2013#April 7–11 (United States)	
2013	April 10	Clinton	Van Buren, Stone, Searcy, Conway	Arkansas	EF1	0	0	Tornadoes of 2013#April 7–11 (United States)	
2013	April 11	Shuqualak, Macon	Noxubee	Mississippi	EF3	0	4	Tornadoes of 2013#April 7–11 (United States)	
2013	May 19	Wichita	Sedgwick	Kansas	EF2	0	0	Tornado outbreak of May 18–21, 2013	
2013	May 20	Oklahoma City, Moore	McClain, Cleveland, Oklahoma	Oklahoma	EF5	24	212	2013 Moore tornado	
2013	May 31	Eastern El Reno, Yukon, Richland, Bethany, Valley Brook, Oklahoma City, Del City, Moore, The Village, Wiley Post Airport	Oklahoma, Canadian	Oklahoma	EF3	8	151	2013 El Reno tornado	
2013	May 31	Eastern El Reno, Yukon, Richland, Bethany, Valley Brook, Oklahoma City, Del City, Moore, The Village, Wiley Post Airport	Oklahoma, Canadian	Oklahoma	EF2	0	0	Tornado outbreak of May 26–31, 2013	
2013	May 31	Eastern El Reno, Yukon, Richland, Bethany, Valley Brook, Oklahoma City, Del City, Moore, The Village, Wiley Post Airport	Oklahoma, Canadian	Oklahoma	EF1	0	0	Tornado outbreak of May 26–31, 2013	
2013	May 31	Eastern El Reno, Yukon, Richland, Bethany, Valley Brook, Oklahoma City, Del City, Moore, The Village, Wiley Post Airport	Oklahoma, Canadian	Oklahoma	EF0	0	0	Tornado outbreak of May 26–31, 2013	
2013	October 4	Cherokee, Aurelia	Cherokee	Iowa	EF4	0	0	October 2013 North American storm complex	
2014	April 27	El Paso, Floyd, Maumelle, Oil Trough, Mayflower, Thida, Vilonia	Faulkner, Independence, Pulaski, White	Arkansas	EF4	16	193	2014 Mayflower–Vilonia tornado	
2014	April 28	Tupelo	Lee, Prentiss, Tishomingo	Mississippi	EF3	1	40	Tornado outbreak of April 27–30, 2014	
2014	April 28	Stallo, Noxapater, Louisville, Center Ridge, Vernon, Millcreek	Neshoba, Attala, Winston	Mississippi	EF4	10	84	2014 Louisville, Mississippi tornado	
2014	April 28	Athens, Cartwright, Elkmont	Limestone	Alabama	EF3	2	12	Tornado outbreak of April 27–30, 2014	
2014	April 28	Bexar, Hackleburg, Hamilton, Pigeye, Shottsville, Weston	Marion	Alabama	EF0	0	0	Tornado outbreak of April 27–30, 2014	
2014	April 28	Kelso, Flintville, Winchester, Lynchburg, Decherd, Estill Springs, Lincoln, Smithland, Molino, Crystal Springs, Hurdlow, Marble Hill, Oak Grove	Lincoln, Moore, Franklin	Tennessee	EF3	2	Unknown	Tornado outbreak of April 27–30, 2014	
2014	April 28	Lake Wildwood, Deerlick Creek Campgrounds, Coaling, Brookwood, Vance, Abernant, Bull City, Lake View	Southern Tuscaloosa	Alabama	EF1	0	0	Tornado outbreak of April 27–30, 2014	
2014	June 16	Burwell	Loup, Garfield, Custer	Nebraska	EF2	0	0	Tornado outbreak of June 16–18, 2014	
2015	May 6	Newcastle, Bridge Creek	McClain, Grady	Oklahoma	EF3	0	6	Tornado outbreak sequence of May 5–10, 2015	
2015	December 23	Holly Springs	Marshall	Mississippi	EF4	9	30	2015 Holly Springs–Ashland tornado	
2016	February 2	Carrollton	Pickens	Alabama	EF2	0	0	February 2016 North American winter storm	
2016	February 24	Cedar Creek, Stedman, Vander, Hobbton, Newton Grove	Cumberland, Sampson	North Carolina	—N/a	0	0	Tornado outbreak of February 23–24, 2016	
2016	May 9	Roff, Hickory	Pontotoc, Murray, Garvin	Oklahoma	EF3	0	Unknown	Tornado outbreak of May 7–10, 2016	
2016	May 9	Roff, Hickory	Pontotoc, Murray, Garvin	Oklahoma	EF1	0	Unknown	Tornado outbreak of May 7–10, 2016	
2016	May 24	Dodge City	Ford	Kansas	EF2	0	2	Tornado outbreak sequence of May 22–26, 2016	
2016	May 25	Chapman	Dickinson	Kansas	EF4	0	8	2016 Abilene–Chapman tornado	
2016	August 24	Kokomo	Howard	Indiana	EF3	0	20	Tornado outbreak of August 24, 2016	
2016	August 24	Napoleon	Henry	Ohio	EF1	0	0	Tornado outbreak of August 24, 2016	
2017	January 22	Albany	Dougherty	Georgia	EF3	4	50	Tornado outbreak of January 21–23, 2017	
2017	February 7	Madisonville	St. Tammany	Louisiana	EF2	0	3	Tornado outbreak of February 7, 2017	
2017	April 2	Alexandria, Woodworth, Pineville, Tioga, Libuse	Rapides	Louisiana	EF2	0	0	Tornadoes of 2017#April 2–3 (United States)	
2017	April 2	Alexandria, Woodworth, Pineville, Tioga, Libuse	Rapides	Louisiana	EF1	0	0	Tornadoes of 2017#April 2–3 (United States)	
2017	April 2	Midway, Jena	LaSalle	Louisiana	EF2	0	0	Tornadoes of 2017#April 2–3 (United States)	
2017	April 2	Midway, Jena	LaSalle	Louisiana	EF2	0	0	Tornadoes of 2017#April 2–3 (United States)	
2017	April 5	Lumpkin, Preston, Richland, Weston, Americus, Plains, Cordele, Vienna, Leslie, Lilly, De Soto, Cobb, Georgia Veterans State Park	Stewart, Webster, Sumter, Dooly, Crisp	Georgia	EF2	0	Unknown	Tornadoes of 2017#April 4–6 (United States)	
2018	April 6	Coushatta, Edgefield, Grand Bayou, Armistead	DeSoto, Red River	Louisiana	EF2	0	0	Tornadoes of 2018#April 6–7 (United States)	
2018	July 19	Marshalltown	Marshall, Tama	Iowa	EF3	0	22	2018 Iowa tornado outbreak	
2018	December 1	Taylorville, Stonington	Christian	Illinois	EF3	0	22	Tornado outbreak of November 30 – December 2, 2018	
2019	March 3	Phenix City, Smiths Station, Ladonia, Hamilton, Waverly Hall, Bibb City	Lee, Russell, Muscogee, Harris	Alabama, Georgia	EF4	23	97	2019 Beauregard tornado	
2019	May 20	Leach	Delaware, Cherokee	Oklahoma	EF2	0	0	Tornado outbreak of May 20–23, 2019	
2019	May 22	Oronogo	Jasper	Missouri	EF3	3	1	Tornado outbreak of May 20–23, 2019	
2019	May 22	Jefferson City	Cole, Callaway	Missouri	EF3	0	32	Tornado outbreak of May 20–23, 2019	
2019	May 27	Dayton, Kettering, Beavercreek, Huber Heights, Fairborn, Xenia, Trotwood	Greene, Montgomery	Ohio	EF4	1	166	2019 Dayton tornado	
2019	May 28	Lawrence, Eudora, Kansas City, Shawnee, Lenexa, De Soto	Douglas, Johnson, Wyandotte, Leavenworth	Kansas	EF4	0	4	2019 Linwood tornado	
2019	December 16	Alexandria, Pineville	Rapides	Louisiana	EF3	1	Unknown	Tornado outbreak of December 16–17, 2019	

=== 2020–present ===
Year	Date	Cities	Counties or Parishes	States	F/EF#	Deaths	Injuries	Event link	Refs
2020	March 24	Allsboro, Mynot, Maud, Redrock	Colbert	Alabama	EF1	0	0	List of United States tornadoes from January to March 2020#March 24 event	
2020	April 12	Monroe	Ouachita	Louisiana	EF3	0	0	2020 Monroe tornado	
2020	April 12	Collins, Sumrall, Seminary, Bassfield, Williamsburg, Laurel, Ellisville, Sharon, Sandersville, Quitman, Stonewall, Enterprise	Marion, Lawrence, Covington, Lamar, Jefferson Davis, Jasper, Jones, Clarke	Mississippi	EF4	4	≥3	2020 Easter tornado outbreak	
2020	April 12	Collins, Sumrall, Seminary, Bassfield, Williamsburg, Laurel, Ellisville, Sharon, Sandersville, Quitman, Stonewall, Enterprise	Marion, Lawrence, Covington, Lamar, Jefferson Davis, Jasper, Jones, Clarke	Mississippi	EF4	8	95	2020 Bassfield–Soso tornado	
2020	April 12	Collins, Taylorsville, Mount Olive, Soso, Stringer	Covington, Lamar, Smith, Jones	Mississippi	EF3	0	2	2020 Easter tornado outbreak	
2020	April 12	Ooltewah, Collegedale	Hamilton	Tennessee	EF3	3	19	2020 Easter tornado outbreak	
2020	April 13	Walterboro	Colleton	South Carolina	EF1	0	0	2020 Easter tornado outbreak	
2020	April 13	Walterboro	Colleton	South Carolina	EF1	1	1	2020 Easter tornado outbreak	
2020	April 22	Jasper	Northeastern Jasper	Texas	EF2	0	0	Tornado outbreak of April 21–23, 2020	
2020	April 22	Fort Polk	Southern Vernon	Louisiana	EF2	0	0	Tornado outbreak of April 21–23, 2020	
2021	March 25	Hoover, Vestavia Hills, Trussville, Leeds, Moody	Shelby, Jefferson	Alabama	EF3	0	5	Tornado outbreak sequence of March 24–28, 2021	
2021	March 25	Greensboro, Centreville, Montevallo, Calera, Columbiana	Hale, Bibb, Perry, Chilton, Shelby, Talladega	Alabama	EF3	0	13	Tornado outbreak sequence of March 24–28, 2021	
2021	March 25	Newnan, Peachtree City, Madras, Fayetteville, Jonesboro	Fayette, Coweta, Fulton, Clayton	Georgia	EF4	1	0	Tornado outbreak sequence of March 24–28, 2021	
2021	May 2	Tupelo	Lee, Itawamba, Tishomingo, Prentiss	Mississippi	EF1	0	0	Tornado outbreak of May 2–4, 2021	
2021	May 2	Tupelo	Lee, Itawamba, Tishomingo, Prentiss	Mississippi	EF1	0	0	Tornado outbreak of May 2–4, 2021	
2021	September 1	Trenton, Bensalem, Ewing, Willingboro, Florence, Burlington, Bristol, Bordentown, Pennington, Beverly, Yardley, Tullytown, Langhorne, Washington Crossing, Windsor, Florence-Roebling, Woodside, Edinburg, White Horse, Andalusia	Mercer, Burlington, Bucks	New Jersey, Pennsylvania	EF1	0	0	Hurricane Ida tornado outbreak	
2021	October 24	Chester, Bremen, New Palestine	Randolph	Illinois	EF2	0	0	Tornadoes of 2021#October 24–25 (United States)	
2021	December 10	Denton, Steele, Caruthersville, Hayti, Tiptonville	Mississippi, Pemiscot, Dunklin, Dyer, Lake	Arkansas, Missouri, Tennessee	EF4	8	16	2021 Monette–Samburg tornado	
2021	December 10	Mayfield, Benton, Princeton, Dawson Springs, St. Charles, Earlington, Anton, Bremen	Graves, Marshall, Caldwell, Hopkins, Muhlenberg, McLean	Kentucky	EF4	57	519	2021 Western Kentucky tornado	
2022	April 5	Allendale, Sycamore, Seigling	Allendale	South Carolina	EF3	0	1	Tornado outbreak of April 4–7, 2022	
2022	April 11	Cato, Gibson, Olmstead, Macon, Little Rock AFB, Jacksonville	Lonoke, Faulkner, Pulaski	Arkansas	EF1	0	0	April 2022 North American storm complex	
2022	April 15	Viola, Salem, Mammoth Spring, Sturkie, Glencoe, Hardy, Ash Flat, Highland, Cherokee Village, Imboden, Ravenden, Ravenden Springs, Black Rock, Walnut Ridge, Fontaine, Bono	Fulton, Randolph, Jackson, Lawrence, Sharp, Greene, Craighead	Arkansas	—N/a	0	0	—N/a	
2022	November 4	Idabel, Broken Bow	McCurtain, Red River	Oklahoma, Texas	EF4	0	13	Tornado outbreak of November 4–5, 2022	
2022	November 4	New Boston, Hooks, Foreman, Richmond, Ashdown, Redbank	Little River, Bowie	Texas, Arkansas	EF3	0	0	Tornado outbreak of November 4–5, 2022	
2023	January 12	Vida Junction, Marbury, Deatsville, New Prospect, Equality, Nixburg, Titus, Alexander City, Wind Creek State Park	Autauga, Elmore, Chilton, Coosa, Tallapoosa	Alabama	EF3	7	16	Tornado outbreak of January 12, 2023	
2023	January 24	Pasadena, Deer Park, Houston Ship Channel, Morgan's Point, San Jacinto State Park, Baytown, Highlands, Channelview, Barrett, Mont Belvieu, Cove, Old River-Winfree	Southern Harris, Western Chambers	Texas	EF3	0	0	2023 Pasadena–Deer Park tornado	
2023	March 24	Rolling Fork, Anguilla, Louise, Midnight, Silver City, Tchula	Humphreys, Sharkey, Holmes, Carroll, Leflore	Mississippi	EF4	17	165	2023 Rolling Fork tornado	
2023	March 24	Winona	Carroll, Webster, Montgomery	Mississippi	EF3	3	5	Tornado outbreak of March 24–27, 2023	
2023	March 24	New Wren, Amory, Hatley, Smithville	Itawamba, Monroe	Mississippi	EF3	2	55	2023 Amory tornado	
2023	March 31	Metro Little Rock, Sherwood, Jacksonville	Prairie, Lonoke, Faulkner, White, Pulaski	Arkansas	EF3	1	54	2023 Little Rock tornado	
2023	March 31	Parkin, Earle, Dixonville, Quito, Drummonds, Gilt Edge	Crittenden, Cross, Tipton, Shelby	Arkansas, Tennessee	EF3	4	26	2023 Wynne–Parkin tornado	
2023	March 31	Covington	Tipton, Lauderdale, Haywood	Tennessee	EF3	1	28	Tornado outbreak of March 31 – April 1, 2023	
2023	March 31	Robinson	Crawford	Illinois	EF3	6	16	2023 Robinson–Sullivan tornado	
2023	June 23	Scottsbluff, Gering	Scotts Bluff, Morrill, Sioux	Nebraska	EF2	0	1	Tornado outbreak sequence of June 20–26, 2023	
2023	December 9	Hendersonville, Gallatin	Davidson, Sumner, Wilson	Tennessee	EF2	3	22	2023 Hendersonville tornado	
2024	April 26	Elkhorn, Bennington, Blair	Sarpy, Douglas, Saunders, Washington, Pottawattamie, Harrison	Nebraska, Iowa	EF4	0	4	2024 Elkhorn–Blair tornado	
2024	April 26	Minden, Shelby, Tennant, Harlan	Pottawattamie, Harrison, Shelby	Iowa	EF3	1	3	2024 Minden–Harlan tornado	
2024	May 6	Barnsdall, Bartlesville, Dewey	Osage, Washington	Oklahoma	EF4	2	33	2024 Barnsdall tornado	
2024	May 7	Union City, Hodunk, Sherwood, Girard	Branch	Michigan	EF2	0	20	Tornado outbreak of May 6–10, 2024	
2024	May 8	Spring Hill, Chapel Hill, Holts Corner, College Grove, Eagleville	Marshall, Rutherford, Maury, Williamson	Tennessee	EF3	1	4	Tornado outbreak of May 6–10, 2024	
2024	May 8	Henagar, Hammondville, Mentone	DeKalb	Alabama	EF3	0	7	Tornado outbreak of May 6–10, 2024	
2024	May 19	Custer City	Custer	Oklahoma	EF2	0	0	Tornado outbreak of May 19–22, 2024	
2024	May 24	New Boston, Hooks	Bowie	Texas	—N/a	0	0	—N/a	
2024	May 26	Crider, Dawson Springs, Charleston, Earlington, Mortons Gap	Caldwell, Lyon, Hopkins	Kentucky	EF3	1	21	Tornado outbreak of May 25–27, 2024	
2024	May 30	None (Note: No populated places were included in the warning, however it did include rural areas south of Midland International Airport.)	Midland, Upton	Texas	EF2	0	0	Tornadoes of 2024#May 30 (United States)	
2025	March 14	Van Buren, Fremont	Carter	Missouri	EF3	0	0	Tornado outbreak of March 14–16, 2025	
2025	March 15	Prentiss, Bassfield, Silver Creek	Walthall, Lawrence, Marion, Jefferson Davis	Mississippi	EF4	6	14	2025 Kentwood–Carson tornado	
2025	April 2	Lake City, Monette	Craighead, Poinsett, Mississippi, Pemiscot, Dunklin	Arkansas, Missouri	EF3	0	8	Tornado outbreak and floods of April 2–7, 2025	
2025	April 3	Slayden, Moscow, Williston, Grand Junction	Marshall, Benton, Fayette, Hardeman	Mississippi, Tennessee	EF3	2	3	Tornado outbreak and floods of April 2–7, 2025	
2025	April 17	Essex	Fremont, Montgomery, Page	Iowa	EF1	0	0	Tornadoes of 2025#April 17–20 (United States)	
2025	May 16	Marion, Creal Springs, Dykersburg, Carrier Mills	Williamson, Saline	Illinois	EF4	0	7	2025 Marion, Illinois tornado	
2025	May 18	Greensburg	Kiowa	Kansas	EF3	0	0	2025 South Kansas tornado family	
2025	May 18	Plevna	Reno	Kansas	EF3	0	0	2025 South Kansas tornado family	
2025	May 20	Madison, Huntsville	Madison, Limestone	Alabama	EF2	0	0	Tornado outbreak of May 18–21, 2025	
2026	March 10	Knox	Starke	Indiana	EF2	0	0	Tornado outbreak of March 10–12, 2026	
2026	April 23	Enid	Garfield	Oklahoma	EF4	0	10	Tornado outbreak sequence of April 23–28, 2026	
2026	May 6	Meadville, Bude, McCall Creek, Brookhaven, Bogue Chitto, Monticello, Silver Creek	Franklin, Lincoln, Lawrence, Jefferson Davis	Mississippi	EF3	0	13	Tornadoes of 2026#May 6–7 (United States)	
2026	May 17	Hebron	Thayer	Nebraska	EF1	0	0	Tornadoes of 2026#May 17–18 (United States)	
2026	May 18	Pawnee City	Pawnee	Nebraska	—N/a	0	0	Tornadoes of 2026#May 17–18 (United States)	
2026	June 11	La Rose, Toluca, Wenona	Marshall	Illinois	EF3	0	0	Tornado outbreak and derecho of June 9–11, 2026	

== See also ==
- List of Storm Prediction Center extremely critical days
- List of Storm Prediction Center high risk days
- List of tornadoes and tornado outbreaks
- Particularly Dangerous Situation
