= 2023 Little Rock tornado =

High-end EF3 tornado event in Arkansas

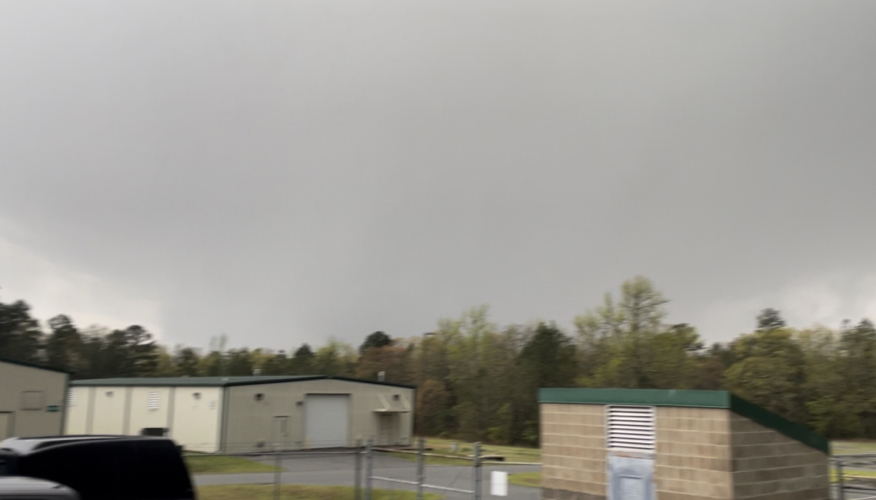
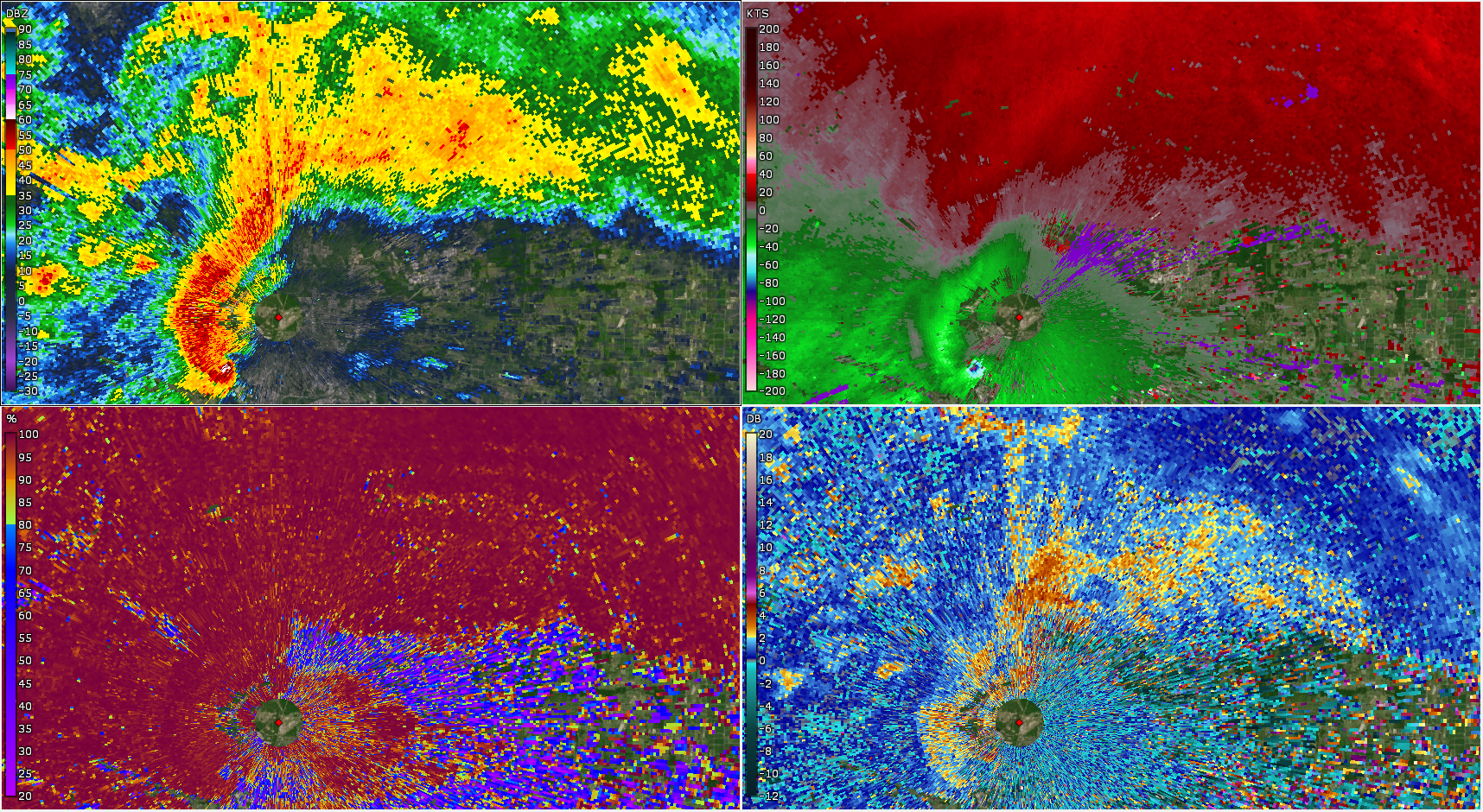
- Top: The Little Rock EF3 wedge tornado as seen from Camp Joseph T. Robinson; Bottom: NEXRAD radar scan of the Little Rock, Arkansas EF3 tornado.

Meteorological history
- Formed: March 31, 2023, 2:18 p.m. CDT (UTC−05:00)
- Dissipated: March 31, 2023, 2:58 p.m. CDT (UTC−05:00)
- Duration: 40 minutes

EF3 tornado
- on the Enhanced Fujita scale
- Highest winds: 165 mph (266 km/h)

Overall effects
- Fatalities: 0 (1 indirect)
- Injuries: 54
- Damage: >$90 million
- Economic losses: >$489 million (total insurance payouts)
- Part of the Tornado outbreak of March 31 – April 1, 2023 and Tornadoes of 2023

On the afternoon of March 31, 2023, a large and destructive tornado struck Little Rock and the North Little Rock subdivisions of Martindale and Indian Hills, as well as Jacksonville and areas south of Cabot, in the US state of Arkansas. The tornado, the first of the historic March 31 outbreak, would move through heavily populated areas of the Little Rock metro while also causing significant damage to multiple parks.

Numerous casualties, estimated at 600 at one point, were reported, alongside one indirect fatality and widespread damage primarily in Little Rock and North Little Rock. Significant damage occurred to structures, with nearly 600 receiving major damage, and damage to forested areas produced a significant volume of organic debris. Cleanup and recovery efforts were still underway a year later. The Walnut Valley neighborhood of Little Rock was the most heavily affected, however, recovery efforts in the area were criticized for crime and a weakening rebuilding effort. Widespread effects to insurance rates in Arkansas occurred in the aftermath of the tornado and other severe weather in the region.

== Meteorological synopsis ==
Radar loop highlighting Arkansas and the evolution of the Little Rock and Wynne supercells

The Storm Prediction Center outlined a high risk convective outlook, the highest risk level, over much of central and western Arkansas on March 31, as a significant severe weather outbreak was expected to occur.

The system initially posed a threat of large hail, but atmospheric conditions later became more conducive to the development of long-track, potentially violent tornadoes. During the early afternoon, a capped environment initially limited the potential for tornado development. However the cap eventually weakened, allowing atmospheric instability to increase. MLCAPE values reached 1500–2500 J/kg and storm-relative helicity values reached 300–600 m^{2}s^{2} as storms pushed towards the state's borders with Tennessee and Mississippi. Little Rock was included in that afternoon's outlook's Moderate risk (4/5) contour.

A supercell moving over Pike and Saline counties began exhibiting signs of tornadic development as it approached Little Rock, dropping a funnel cloud over Garland County at 1:18 pm. The National Weather Service in Little Rock issued a tornado warning at 2:03 pm as the storm made its final approach to Pulaski County, fifteen minutes before the Little Rock tornado was first spotted. The tornado first began causing damage at 2:18 p.m. in the Martindale subdivision of Little Rock, becoming the first to touch down of the March 31 outbreak.

== Tornado summary ==
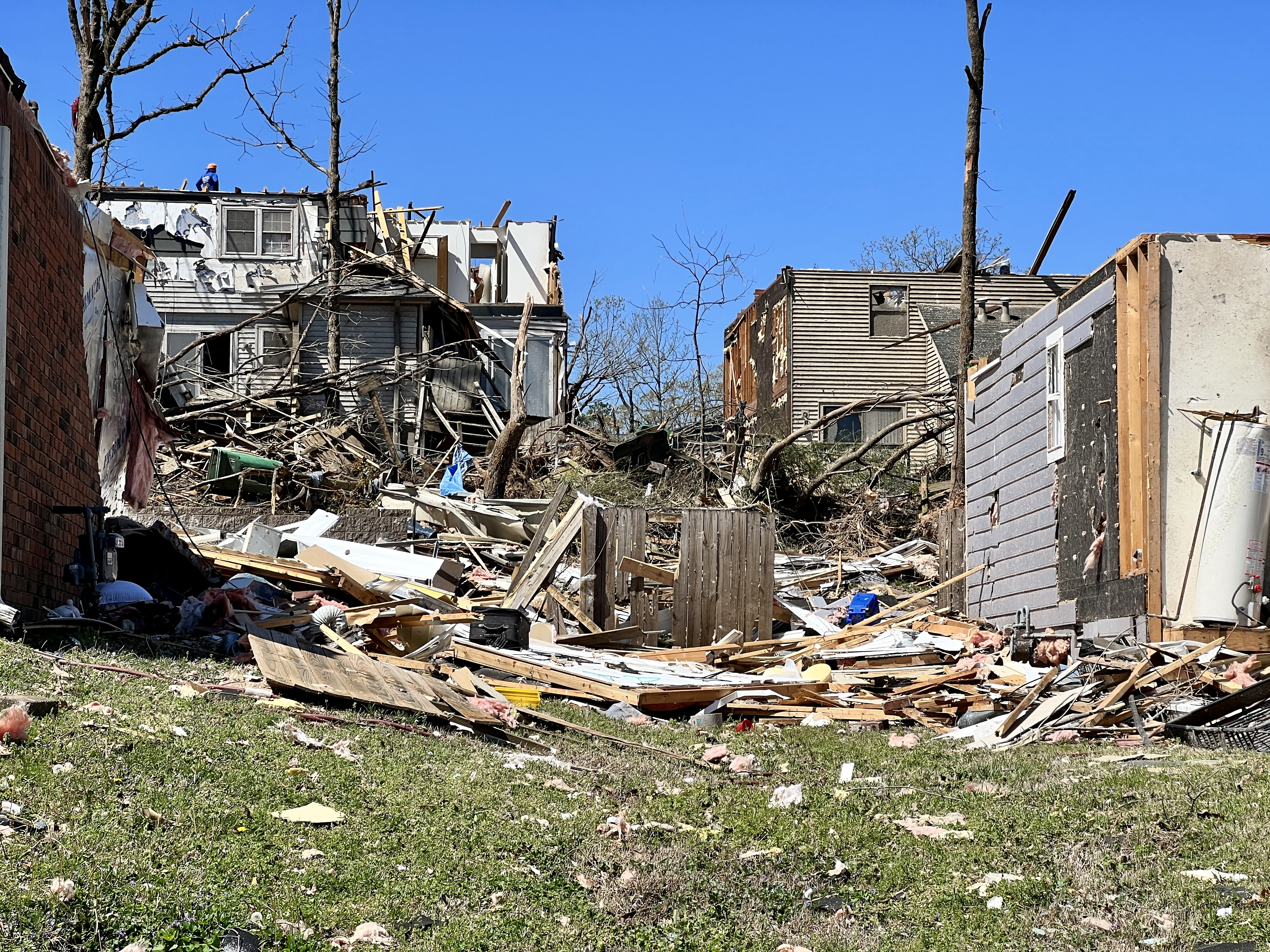
Much of the most significant damage from the tornado occurred in residential areas of the Little Rock metro.

=== Formation and path through Little Rock ===
The tornado developed just southwest of the Martindale community, near the intersection of Colonel Glenn Road and Marsh Road in Pulaski County at 2:18 p.m. CDT. Moving through Martindale into densely forested areas to the northeast, the tornado produced EF0 to EF1 damage, downing many trees and ripping a portion of a roof off an outbuilding. The tornado continued causing minor damage as it entered a subdivision off of Capitol Hill Boulevard, where some trees were snapped and fences were blown down. As it moved into the more populated Chenal Valley area of western Little Rock at EF1 intensity, the tornado damaged the roofs of homes in residential areas, inflicted considerable damage to a funeral home, damaged some businesses, and downed more trees.

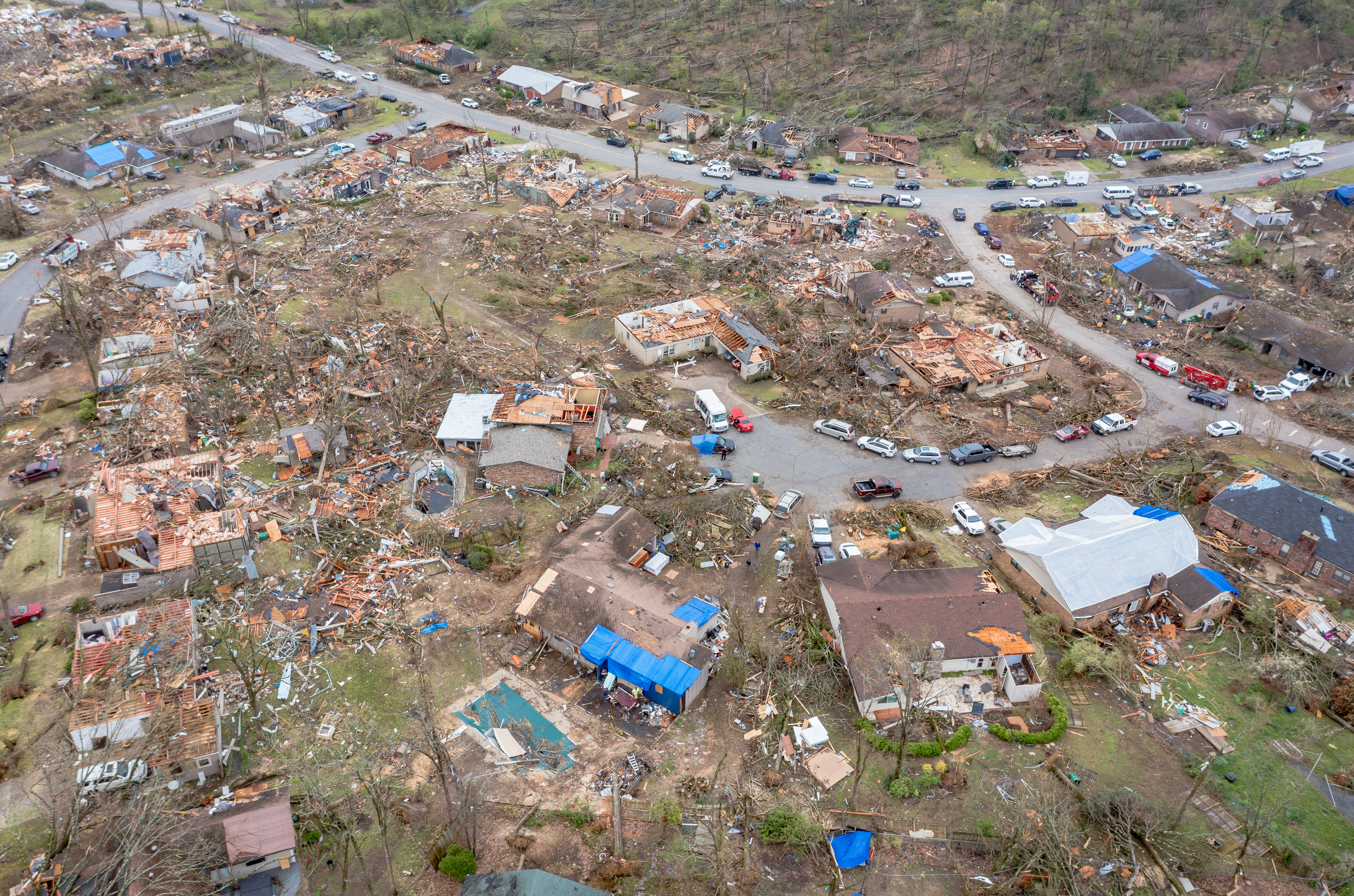
Aerial view of major damage to homes in a residential area of Little Rock after the tornado struck.

As it crossed over the Chenal Parkway, the tornado rapidly intensified to EF3 strength and struck the Calais Forest Apartments, where multiple three-story apartment buildings had roofs and exterior walls ripped off, and some sustained destruction of their top floors. A large radio tower was knocked over, and the nearby Turtle Creek Apartments were damaged to a lesser extent. The tornado then caused widespread major damage as it entered the Breckenridge neighborhood at high-end EF2 strength, where numerous homes were severely damaged and had their roofs torn off, including some that had their exterior walls knocked down. The tornado then reached its peak intensity at the intersection of North Shackelford Road and Breckenridge Drive, where two neighboring two-story homes were completely flattened. These homes were anchored with nails rather than bolts, earning a high-end EF3 rating. The nearby Little Rock Fire Station 9, Shepherd Fold Church, a few businesses, and homes in surrounding neighborhoods sustained major damage, with damage intensity ranging from EF2 to EF3. Briefly weakening, the tornado caused EF1 damage as it crossed I-430 at the Rodney Parham Road interchange, damaging a shopping center and a Kroger, as well as flipping cars in a parking lot. Continuing northeastward through more residential areas on the west side of Reservoir Road, it became strong again, producing EF2 to EF3 damage as many homes and apartment buildings sustained total loss of their roofs and exterior walls. A cell tower was collapsed at Little Rock Reservoir Park, and damage at that location was rated EF2. Northeast of this area, the tornado weakened some but continued to cause extensive damage at EF1 to EF2 strength, crossing Cantrell Road and moving through more residential areas into the suburb of Cammack Village. Many homes, apartments, and businesses were damaged, and many trees were downed along this segment of the path, some of which landed on structures. A shopping mall had its roof damaged, the Pulaski County Title Office sustained total collapse of a large brick exterior wall, vehicles were moved and damaged, and several houses had large portions of their roofs removed. The National Weather Service Office in Little Rock issued a tornado emergency for Metro Little Rock as the tornado was impacting Cammack Village before being forced to take cover themselves shortly after that as the tornado was approaching their office, which is located just north of the North Little Rock Municipal Airport. Warning responsibilities were transferred to the Memphis, Tennessee, office during this time.

=== North Little Rock, Lonoke County, and dissipation ===
The tornado weakened further as it moved across the Arkansas River and through Burns Park, where hundreds, if not thousands, of trees were snapped or uprooted at EF1 strength. Continuing across I-40/US 65 into the Amboy neighborhood in North Little Rock, it strengthened back to EF2 intensity. A motel, some apartment buildings, and multiple houses were unroofed in this area. Several restaurants and businesses were damaged as well, including Dog Town Pizza, which had its roof torn off and sustained some collapse of exterior walls. Large light poles were bent to the ground at a baseball field, power poles were snapped, and a new fire station that was under construction along Military Drive was also damaged. Large trees were also downed throughout Amboy, some of which landed on residences and caused structural damage. EF1 to EF2 damage continued into the Indian Hills neighborhood, where a church, some apartment buildings, and many homes sustained roof damage, including a few houses that had partial to total roof loss. The tornado then crossed AR 107 into Sherwood, prompting the issuance of another tornado emergency for both Sherwood and Jacksonville. A majority of the damage in Sherwood was rated EF1, as homes sustained heavy roof and garage damage, garden sheds were destroyed, some businesses were damaged, and numerous trees were downed. However, an isolated area of EF2 damage was noted on Austin Bay Court, where a residence was significantly damaged. In addition, the Longstreth Apartments suffered high-end EF1 damage, sustaining roof loss.

After crossing over Indianhead Lake, the tornado briefly moved through unpopulated marshland as it approached Jacksonville, producing only EF0 to EF1 tree damage. Highway signs were damaged, and a tractor-trailer was flipped as the tornado crossed US 67/US 167/Future I-57 at the Redmond Road interchange. The tornado began to strengthen again as it entered Jacksonville and moved through the baseball fields at Dupree Park, where large light poles were snapped at the base, many trees were snapped or uprooted, a building was damaged, and damage at the park was rated EF1 to EF2. Mainly EF2 damage occurred as the tornado severely damaged many homes, apartment buildings, and businesses throughout the town, many of which had their roofs torn off. A small strip mall, some self-storage buildings, a gas station, and a laundromat were destroyed, and debris from the laundromat was thrown into a nearby church, inflicting major structural damage. A small pocket of EF3 damage occurred along North Elm Street south of Graham Road, where the First Assembly of God Church was almost completely destroyed. The tornado then entered the Holland Bottoms State Wildlife Area, snapping or uprooting many trees at EF1 to EF2 strength as it moved into Lonoke County. EF1 to EF2 damage continued as the tornado moved into the Parnell community, where multiple homes sustained varying degrees of roof damage, including one home that was heavily damaged and sustained destruction of its attached garage, and many trees and power poles were snapped. Multiple metal-framed garage buildings were damaged or completely destroyed in Parnell, and a mobile home along AR 89 was also destroyed. After exiting Parnell, the tornado inflicted EF0 to EF1 damage to a few homes and some trees along AR 321 before dissipating southeast of Cabot at around 2:57 p.m. CDT.

The tornado was on the ground for 34.44 miles (55.43 km) and reached a peak width of 600 yards (550 m). A total of 2,648 structures were damaged or destroyed throughout the city. Little Rock officials deployed 115 city workers to clear debris from roadways, and all routes were cleared for traffic by the afternoon of April 1. Shortly after the tornado struck, a mass casualty event was declared for the area, with the initial casualty count being over 600 injuries, though this figure was later found to be untrue. Fifty-four injuries were directly attributed to the tornado, with one indirect fatality occurring due to the tornado as well. $90 million in damages were attributed to the tornado.

== Aftermath ==
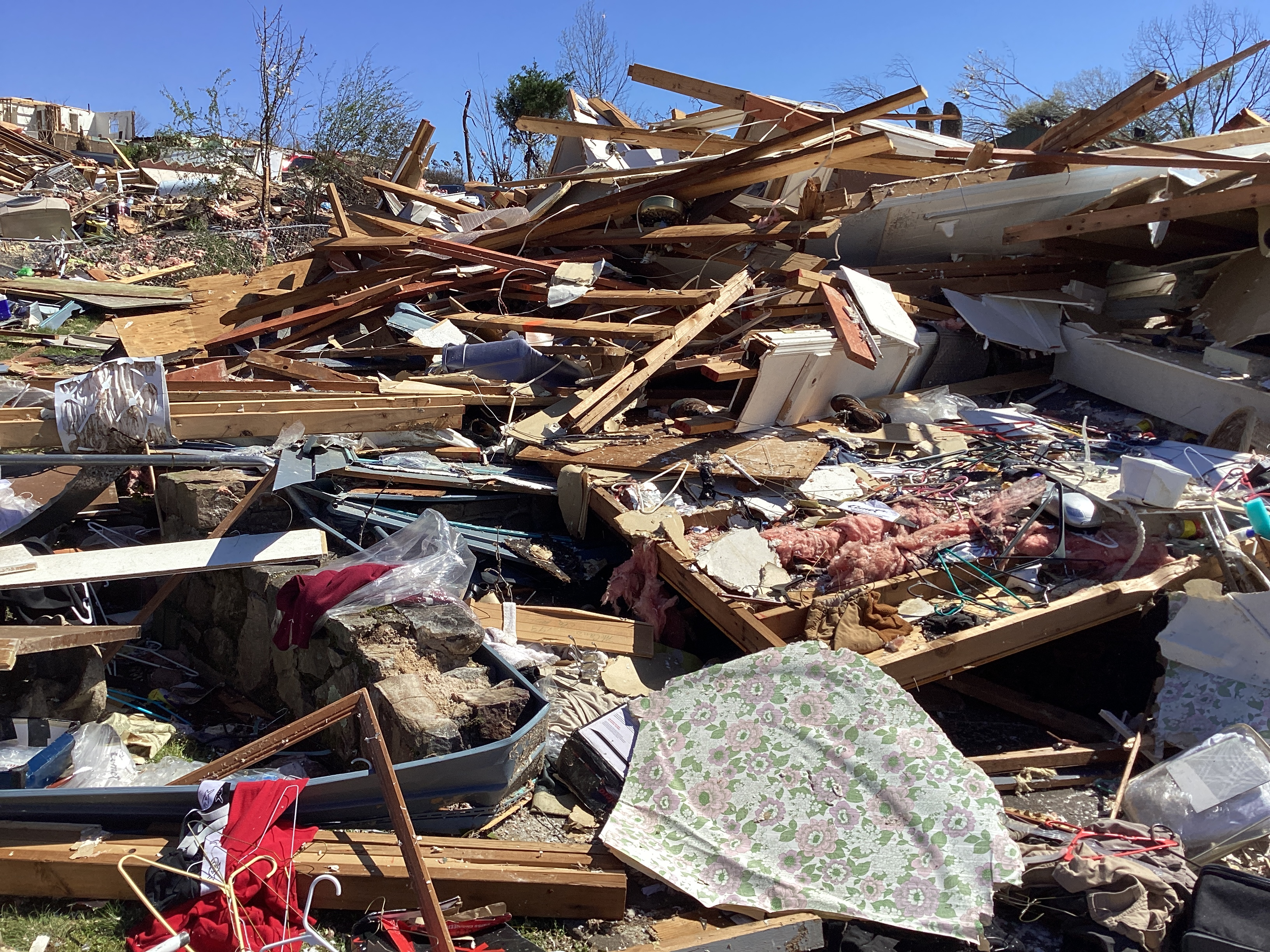
Houses leveled at high-end EF3 intensity by tornado in the Walnut Valley neighborhood of Little Rock.

Initial estimates from emergency management stated that 600 had been injured. This figure fell sharply to 24 in a statement by mayor Frank Scott Jr. that evening. A mass casualty event was declared as hospitals in the region reported a surge of hospitalizations. In addition, a curfew was put in effect for North Little Rock in the days following the tornado. 130,000 cubic yards (99,000 m^{3}) of organic debris, including piles up to 20 feet (6.1 m) high at Reservoir Park, were collected in Little Rock.

On September 12, 2023, the National September 11 Memorial & Museum selected Little Rock as one of three cities, alongside Uvalde, Texas (following a school shooting) and Waukesha, Wisconsin (following a vehicle ramming attack) to receive a seedling as part of their Survivor Tree program. The tree was to be planted in Walnut Valley. In August 2024, the Arkansas Association of the Deaf held courses to increase disaster preparedness for the regional deaf community after electricity and means to be alerted to severe weather were cut during and following the Little Rock tornado.

=== Recovery efforts ===
The city of Little Rock determined that 588 properties in the city received major damage. A representative of Little Rock's Walnut Valley stated that the recovery in the neighborhood, where the most devastating damage occurred, had been unsatisfactory. Frequent incidents of theft in the neighborhood led to a request for increased police presence, but the Little Rock Police Department responded with saying they lacked the staffing to do so. A separate statement from the police department and the mayor state that areas affected by the tornado were already receiving additional police patrol. One resident stated that a cul-de-sac in the neighborhood was being used for illegal dumping, while area roads were covered in nails and other debris.

=== Insurance claims ===
Over $489 million of insurance claims from Little Rock were paid by December 31, 2023, including from other area severe weather that day. One area policy holder reported that their $1100 monthly Farm Bureau policy rose $600 following the tornado, up to $1700 per month. Arkansas had the second highest insurance loss ratio in the United States in 2023 at 144% (i.e. $1.44 paid as compensation to $1.00 received by insurance companies).

== See also ==
- List of United States tornado emergencies
- Weather of 2023
