= Abernant =

Abernant may refer to:

== Places ==
=== United Kingdom ===
- Abernant, Carmarthenshire, Wales
- Abernant, Powys, Wales
- Abernant, Rhondda Cynon Taf, Wales

=== United States ===
- Abernant, Alabama

== Other uses ==
- Abernant (horse), an English thoroughbred racehorse
