= List of shipwrecks in May 1859 =

The list of shipwrecks in May 1859 includes ships sunk, foundered, grounded, or otherwise lost during May 1859.

== 1 May ==
List of shipwrecks: 1 May 1859
Ship	State	Description
Royal Thistle	United Kingdom	The brig was driven ashore at Truro, Cornwall.

== 2 May ==
List of shipwrecks: 2 May 1859
Ship	State	Description
Celt	United Kingdom	The steamship was driven ashore at Calshot Castle, Hampshire. She was on a voyage from the Cape of Good Hope, Cape Colony to Southampton, Hampshire. She was refloated the next day and taken in to Southampton.
Curlew	United Kingdom	The brig was driven ashore in the Dardanelles. She was refloated on 4 May.
Thor	Sweden	The ship ran aground on the Haisborough Sands, in the North Sea off the coast of Norfolk, United Kingdom. She was refloated but was subsequently driven ashore at Lowestoft, Suffolk, United Kingdom. She was on a voyage from Gothenburg to Paimbœuf, Loire-Inférieure, France. She was refloated and taken in to Lowestoft.

== 3 May ==
List of shipwrecks: 3 May 1859
Ship	State	Description
Blossom	United Kingdom	The schooner was destroyed by fire at Inverness. She was on a voyage from Sunderland, County Durham to Inverness.
Fairy Queen	United Kingdom	The schooner was driven ashore at La-Tranche-sur-Mer, Vendée, France.
Giaour	United Kingdom	The brig was driven ashore and wrecked 20 nautical miles (37 km) south of Cape Henry, Virginia, United States. She was on a voyage from Pernambuco, Brazil to Baltimore, Maryland, United States.
Glen Isla	United Kingdom	The ship ran aground at Calcutta, India. She was on a voyage from Sydney, New South Wales to Calcutta. She was refloated.
Mary and Eliza	United Kingdom	The ship sprang a leak and was beached in the Tagus. She was on a voyage from Sunderland to Lisbon, Portugal.
Vestal	United Kingdom	The brig was driven ashore and wrecked 20 nautical miles (37 km) south of Cape Henry. She was on a voyage from Pernambuco to Baltimore.

== 4 May ==
List of shipwrecks: 4 May 1859
Ship	State	Description
Delta	United Kingdom	The ship ran aground at South Shields, County Durham. She was on a voyage from South Shields to Callao, Peru. She was refloated with assistance from seven tugs.
Elizabeth	United Kingdom	The barque collided with the pier at South Shields, drove her anchor through her bows and sank. She was on a voyage from Scarborough, Yorkshire to the West Indies. She was refloated in mid-May.
Fleetwood	United States	The ship collided with an iceberg and foundered off Cape Horn, Chile. All 21 people on board took to two boats. Five crew in one boat were rescued on 10 May by the barque Imogene (United Kingdom). Seventeen people in the second boat were reported as making for the Falkland Islands. They were not heard of again. Fleetwood was on a voyage from Boston, Massachusetts to the Society Islands.
Governor	United Kingdom	The sloop ran aground in the Old End Channel. She was on a voyage from Hartlepool, County Durham to Ramsgate, Kent. She was driven ashore in Pegwell Bay and wrecked. Her crew were rescued.
Marie	United Kingdom	The ship ran aground at Thornham, Norfolk, United Kingdom and was damaged. She was on a voyage from Danzig to Thorham. She had been refloated by 13 May and taken in to Thornham.
Ocean	United Kingdom	The smack was driven ashore on Kerrera, Inner Hebrides. She capsized and was wrecked. Harmony was on a voyage from Ardrossan, Ayrshire to the Isle of Mull, Inner Hebrides.

== 5 May ==
List of shipwrecks: 5 May 1859
Ship	State	Description
Australië	Netherlands	The ship was wrecked on the Shipwash Sand, in the North Sea off the coast of Suffolk, United Kingdom with the loss of all 23 people on board. She was on a voyage from South Shields, County Durham, United Kingdom to Cádiz, Spain.
Eliza Monterio	Portugal	The ship was driven ashore near Cascais. Her crew were rescued. She was on a voyage from Liverpool, Lancashire, United Kingdom to Lisbon.
Kingston	United Kingdom	The ship capsized at Shanghai, China and was wrecked.
Mary	United Kingdom	The ship Tivy (flag unknown) collided with and sank Mary in the Irish Sea, and then rescued her crew.
Pacific	United Kingdom	The barque ran aground on the Cross Sand, in the North Sea off the coast of Suffolk. She was on a voyage from Hartlepool, County Durham to Aden. She was refloated and taken in to Lowestoft, Suffolk, where she sank.

== 6 May ==
List of shipwrecks: 6 May 1859
Ship	State	Description
Broughton Hall	United Kingdom	The ship was driven ashore at Egremont, Lancashire. She was on a voyage from Birkenhead, Cheshire to Aden. She was refloated.
Canrobert	United Kingdom	The ship was driven ashore at Punta Mala, Spain. She was on a voyage from Bristol, Gloucestershire to Gibraltar or from Agrigento, Sicily to Newcastle upon Tyne, Northumberland. She was refloated the next day.
Jacob Taylor	United States	The steamship struck a submerged object, sank and caught fire at Cincinnati, Ohio. She was declared a total loss.
Lady May	United States	The steamship collided with the steamship Cedar Rapids (United States) and sank in the Mississippi River at Quincy, Mississippi with the loss of three lives.

== 7 May ==
List of shipwrecks: 7 May 1859
Ship	State	Description
Anne	United Kingdom	The ship was towed in to Holyhead, Anglesey in a sinking condition. She was on a voyage from Poole, Dorset to Liverpool, Lancashire.
Sabina	Netherlands	The ship was wrecked on the coast of Borneo. Her crew were rescued.

== 8 May ==
List of shipwrecks: 8 May 1859
Ship	State	Description
John Ravanel	United States	The ship ran aground on the London Chest, in the Baltic Sea. She was on a voyage from Charleston, South Carolina to Kronstadt, Russia.
Mary Ann	United Kingdom	The brig sprang a leak and foundered about 10 nautical miles (19 km) off Islay, Inner Hebrides. She was on a voyage from the Clyde to Dublin and Saint John, New Brunswick, British North America. Mary Ann was subsequently boarded and beached on Islay where she became a wreck and was plundered by the local inhabitants.

== 9 May ==
List of shipwrecks: 9 May 1859
Ship	State	Description
Donnington	United Kingdom	The coaster ran aground on Scroby Sands, Norfolk and sank. Her crew were rescued. She was on a voyage from Newcastle upon Tyne, Northumberland to London.
Eclipse	Belgium	The schooner ran aground on the Spit of Duncannon, in the Irish Sea. She was on a voyage from Bruges, West Flanders to Liverpool, Lancashire, United Kingdom. She was refloated and taken in to Duncannon, County Wexford, United Kingdom.
HMS Heron	Royal Navy	The Acorn-class brig-sloop was capsized by a tornado and sank in the Atlantic Ocean 200 nautical miles (370 km) off the coast of Sierra Leone (5°01′N 15°30′W) with the loss of most of her crew, at least 107 lives. Forty of the survivors were rescued by the barque Eleanor (United Kingdom).
John Spear	United States	The ship was holed by ice and sank at Kronstadt, Russia.
Lisbon	United Kingdom	The barque ran aground on the Newcombe Sand, in the North Sea off the coast of Suffolk. She was on a voyage from London to South Shields, County Durham. She was refloated.

== 10 May ==
List of shipwrecks: 10 May 1859
Ship	State	Description
Emma	United Kingdom	The ship sprang a leak and sank in the Atlantic Ocean 68 nautical miles (126 km) west by south of Cape St. Vincent, Portugal. Her crew were rescued by the brig Meloditz (Russia). Emma was on a voyage from Glasgow, Renfrewshire to Vigo, Spain and Havana, Cuba.

== 11 May ==
List of shipwrecks: 11 May 1859
Ship	State	Description
Alma	Duchy of Holstein	The schooner was driven ashore on Poel, Prussia. She was on a voyage from Hartlepool, County Durham, United Kingdom to Lübeck. She was later refloated and taken in to Travemünde, where she arrived on 19 May.
Arctic	Flag unknown	The steamship was damaged by fire at Riga.
Isis	United Kingdom	The ship was driven ashore at Great Yarmouth, Norfolk. She was on a voyage from Whitby, Yorkshire to London. She was refloated and taken in to Great Yarmouth.
Ocean Queen	United Kingdom	The ship was driven ashore on Hogland, Russia and sank. Her crew were rescued.

== 12 May ==
List of shipwrecks: 12 May 1859
Ship	State	Description
Eugenia	France	The full-rigged ship struck rocks off the Isle of Glass Lighthouse, Outer Hebrides, United Kingdom and was wrecked. She was on a voyage from Liverpool, Lancashire, United Kingdom to the Gulf of Bothnia.
Fairy Queen	United Kingdom	The schooner was driven ashore at the entrance to the Pertuis Breton. She was on a voyage from L'Orient, Morbihan to Marans, Charente-Inférieure, France. She was refloated on 18 May and taken in to La Rochelle, Charente-Inférieure.
Refuge	France	The ship foundered in the English Channel 40 nautical miles (74 km) west of Havre de Grâce, Seine-Inférieure. Her eighteen crew survived. She was on a voyage from Bordeaux, Gironde to Havre de Grâce.
Wanderer	United Kingdom	The ship foundered off the Skerries. Her crew were rescued by a fishing smack. She was on a voyage from Liverpool, Lancashire to Saint John, New Brunswick, British North America.

== 13 May ==
List of shipwrecks: 13 May 1859
Ship	State	Description
Mary Hammond	United States	The ship ran aground in the Hudson River. She was on a voyage from Liverpool, Lancashire, United Kingdom to New York. She was refloated with the assistance of a tug and taken in to New York.
Wilhelmina	United Kingdom	The ship was abandoned in the Atlantic Ocean. Her crew were rescued by Alexander (United Kingdom). Wilhelmina was on a voyage from Liverpool to Harbour Grace, Nova Scotia, British North America.

== 14 May ==
List of shipwrecks: 14 May 1859
Ship	State	Description
Clyde	United Kingdom	The ship ran aground and was damaged at Saint-Valery-sur-Somme, Somme, France. She was on a voyage from South Shields, County Durham to Saint-Valery-sur-Somme. She was refloated.
Eamont	United Kingdom	The ship ran aground off Brake, Kingdom of Hanover. She was on a voyage from Newcastle upon Tyne, Northumberland to Bremen. She was refloated and taken in to the Weser in a leaky condition.
Favourite	(United Kingdom of Great Britain and Ireland) New South Wales	The ship was driven ashore at Antechamber Bay, South Australia. She was on a voyage from Newcastle to Adelaide, South Australia. She was consequently condemned, but was sold. Favourite had been refloated by 15 August and later towed in to Adelaide.
Leonie	France	The lugger struck rocks near "Parquettes" and was damaged. She was beached near Camaret-sur-Mer, Finistère. She was on a voyage from Sunderland, County Durham to Luçon, Vendée.
Swallow	United Kingdom	The brig was driven ashore and severely damaged near Brake. She was on a voyage from South Shield to Bremen. She was refloated and taken in to Brake.

== 15 May ==
List of shipwrecks: 15 May 1859
Ship	State	Description
Thames	United Kingdom	The ship caught fire at Liverpool, Lancashire.

== 16 May ==
List of shipwrecks: 16 May 1859
Ship	State	Description
Pleiades	United States	The ship caught fire 20 nautical miles (37 km) north west of Great Isaac Cay, Bahamas and was scuttled. Her crew were rescued. She was on a voyage from New Orleans, Louisiana to Queenstown, County Cork, United Kingdom. She was a total loss.
Roseneath	United Kingdom	The ship was driven ashore 50 nautical miles (93 km) south of Cape Henry, Virginia, United States. She was on a voyage from Halifax, Nova Scotia, British North America to Charleston, South Carolina, United States. She was refloated two days later and towed in to Norfolk, Virginia.
Vancouver	United States	The ship was wrecked near Shanghai, China. Her crew were rescued. She was on a voyage from New York to Shanghai.
Virginia	United Kingdom	The ship was wrecked on New Nantucket. Her 25 crew survived. She was on a voyage from Liverpool, Lancashire to the Pacific islands.

== 17 May ==
List of shipwrecks: 17 May 1859
Ship	State	Description
Jessie	United Kingdom	The ship ran aground on the Haisborough Sands, in the North Sea off the coast of Norfolk and sank. Her crew were rescued by the steamship Bruiser (United Kingdom). Jessie was on a voyage from Sunderland, County Durham to London.
Notre Dame des Victoires	France	The ship was driven ashore at South Shields, County Durham, United Kingdom. She was refloated and taken in to South Shields for repairs.
Two Brothers	United Kingdom	The sloop was driven ashore at Wells-next-the-Sea, Norfolk. She was on a voyage from Hartlepool, County Durham to Wells-next-the-Sea. She was refloated.

== 18 May ==
List of shipwrecks: 18 May 1859
Ship	State	Description
Elizabeth	Prussia	The brig ran aground on the Hittark Reef, off the Swedish coast. She was on a voyage from Newcastle upon Tyne, Northumberland, United Kingdom to Swinemünde. She was refloated the next day and resumed her voyage.
John Murray	United Kingdom	The schooner ran aground on the Cockle Sand, in the North Sea off the coast of Norfolk. She was refloated and taken in to Great Yarmouth, Norfolk.

== 19 May ==
List of shipwrecks: 19 May 1859
Ship	State	Description
Alicore	United Kingdom	The ship ran aground on the Seaton Lea Rocks, on the coast of County Durham. She was refloated and taken in to Hartlepool.
George Andrews	United Kingdom	The ship was driven ashore west of Sheringham, Norfolk. She was on a voyage from Sunderland, County Durham to London. She was refloated.
Juno	United Kingdom	The smack ran aground on The Skerries, in the Irish Sea off the coast of County Down and sank. Her crew were rescued.
Leopold	Sweden	The barque was destroyed by fire in Hobsons Bay.
Vulcan	United Kingdom	The ship was driven ashore at Brielle, South Holland, Netherlands.

== 20 May ==
List of shipwrecks: 20 May 1859
Ship	State	Description
Neva	United Kingdom	The brig was driven ashore and wrecked at Wylfa Point near Cemaes, Anglesey. Her crew were rescued. She was on a voyage from Montevideo, Uruguay to Liverpool, Lancashire.

== 22 May ==
List of shipwrecks: 22 May 1859
Ship	State	Description
Vanguard	United Kingdom	The ship ran aground on the Newcombe Sand, in the North Sea off the coast of Suffolk. She was refloated.

== 23 May ==
List of shipwrecks: 23 May 1859
Ship	State	Description
Emelie Jenkins	United Kingdom	The brig was driven ashore in the Dardanelles. She was refloated.
Prince Llewellyn	United Kingdom	The barque was driven ashore in the Dardanelles. She was refloated.

== 24 May ==
List of shipwrecks: 24 May 1859
Ship	State	Description
Bidston	United Kingdom	The full-rigged ship was abandoned in the Atlantic Ocean. Her crew were rescued by Selina (United Kingdom). Bidston was on a voyage from Liverpool, Lancashire to Bombay, India.
Preterinda Marchiena	Netherlands	The koff collided with the barque O. A. (Russia and sank off the Kullen Lighthouse, Sweden. She was on a voyage from Stettin to Leith, Lothian, United Kingdom.

== 26 May ==
List of shipwrecks: 26 May 1859
Ship	State	Description
Maid of the Isles	United Kingdom	The brig ran aground on the Holme Sand, in the North Sea off the coast of Suffolk. She was on a voyage from London to Newcastle upon Tyne, Northumberland. She was refloated and resumed her voyage.
William	United Kingdom	The brig foundered off Sidmouth, Devon. Her crew were rescued. She was on a voyage from Swansea, Glamorgan to Dieppe, Seine-Inférieure, France.

== 28 May ==
List of shipwrecks: 28 May 1859
Ship	State	Description
Cambria	United Kingdom	The ship ran aground on the coast of County Durham. She was refloated and put back to South Shields.
Edward Herbert	United Kingdom	The ship was severely damaged by fire at Valparaíso, Chile.
Standard	United Kingdom	The barque was driven ashore on "Madame Island".
Queen of England	United Kingdom	The ship was driven ashore in the Yangtze Kiang. She was on a voyage from Liverpool, Lancashire to Shanghai, China. She was refloated on 3 June and completed her voyage.

== 29 May ==
List of shipwrecks: 29 May 1859
Ship	State	Description
Iris	United Kingdom	The ship was run down and sunk 20 nautical miles (37 km) west north west of the Bishop's Rock Lighthouse by Aglides (Norway). Her crew were rescued by Aglides. Iris was on a voyage from Swansea, Glamorgan to Liverpool, Lancashire.

== 31 May ==
List of shipwrecks: 31 May 1859
Ship	State	Description
Briton's Pride	United Kingdom	The ship was abandoned at sea. Her crew were rescued by Mayflower (United States).
Mary Ann	United Kingdom	The schooner was driven ashore at Wells-next-the-Sea, Norfolk. She was on a voyage from Newcastle upon Tyne, Northumberland to Swansea, Glamorgan. She was refloated the next day and resumed her voyage.
Pride of the Wear	United Kingdom	The barque ran aground on the Goodwin Sands, Kent. She was on a voyage from Sunderland, County Durham to Alexandria, Egypt. She was refloated and towed in to Ramsgate, Kent.
Princess Royal, or Princess Victoria	United Kingdom	The ship ran aground on the Minerva Bank, in te Atlantic Ocean off Maranhão, Brazil and was wrecked. She was on a voyage from Liverpool, Lancashire to Maranhão.

== Unknown date ==
List of shipwrecks: Unknown date in May 1859
Ship	State	Description
Amelia	United Kingdom	The schooner foundered in the Bristol Channel off Cardiff, Glamorgan. Her four crew were rescued.
Hinton	United Kingdom	The ship was abandoned in the Atlantic Ocean on or before 3 May. Her crew were rescued by Evangeline (United Kingdom). She was on a voyage from Poole, Dorset to Runcorn, Cheshire.
John Fyfe	United Kingdom	The ship ran aground on Flynn's Knoll. She was on a voyage from the Clyde to New York. She was refloated on 9 May and towed in to New York.
Julia Slavianski	Flag unknown	The ship sank at Buenos Aires, Argentina.
Ocean Bride	United Kingdom	The schooner was abandoned in the Atlantic Ocean. Her crew were rescued by Sunbeam (United States). Ocean Bride was on a voyage from the Turks Islands to Port Medway, Nova Scotia, British North America.
Thalia	United Kingdom	The barque was wrecked in the Bahamas before 27 May. She was on a voyage from Saint John, New Brunswick, British North America to Havana, Cuba.
Wilhelmina	Denmark	The ship sank at Kingston, Jamaica. She was on a voyage from Kingston to Liverpool. She had been refloated by 26 May.
