= 2011 Philadelphia, Mississippi tornado =

EF5 tornado in 2011

Coordinates: 32.7992°N 89.1088°W

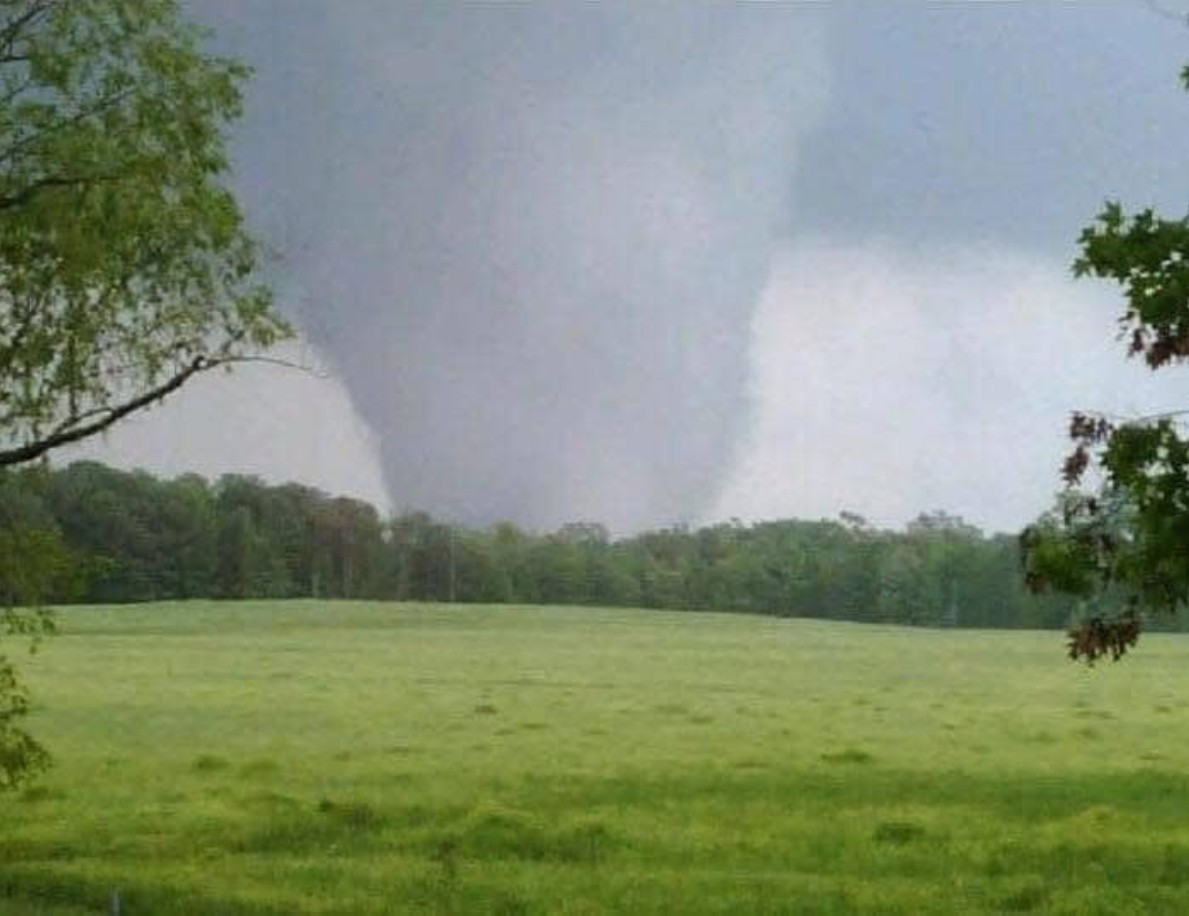
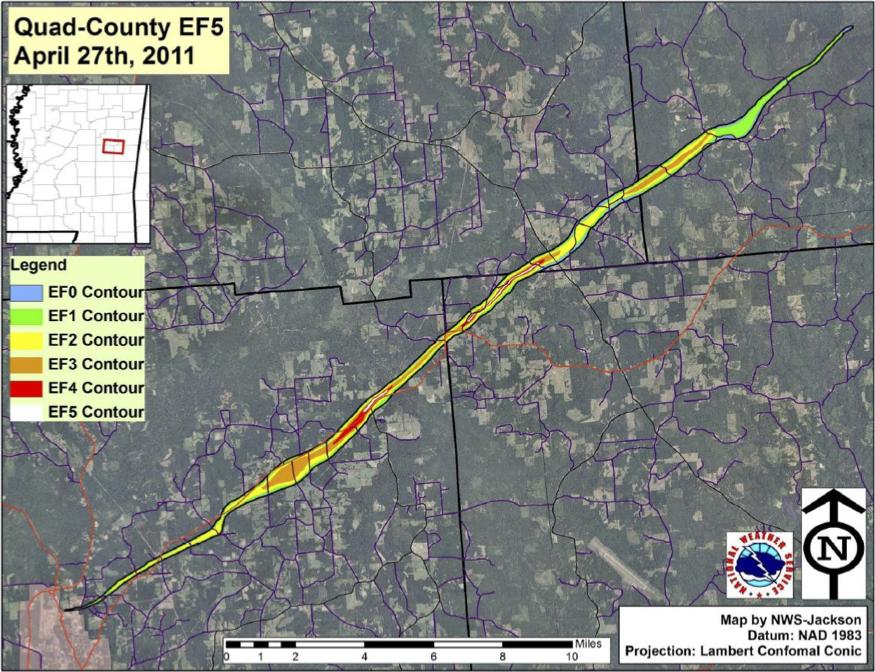
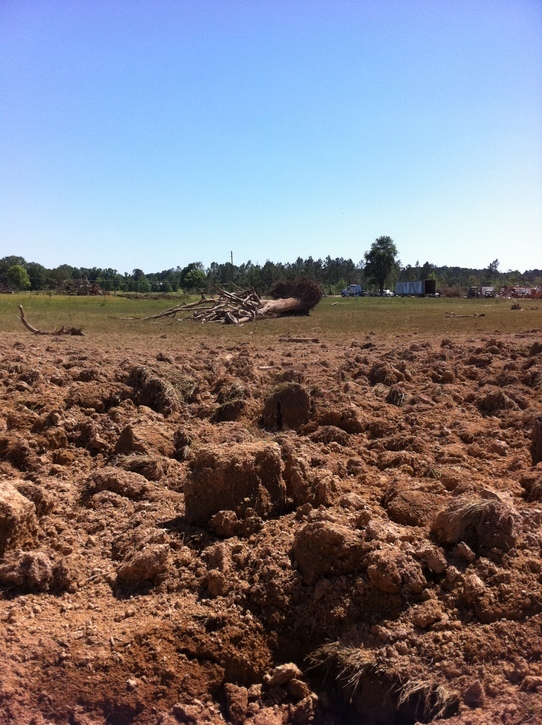
- Clockwise from top: The tornado seen at peak intensity northeast of Philadelphia, Mississippi; tremendous ground scouring left behind by the tornado, with a large, debarked, and defoliated tree that was ripped out by its roots and thrown can also be seen in the background; damage swath of the tornado across eastern Mississippi

Meteorological history
- Formed: April 27, 2011, 2:30 p.m. CDT (UTC−05:00)
- Dissipated: April 27, 2011, 3:00 pm. CDT (UTC−05:00)
- Duration: 30 minutes

EF5 tornado
- on the Enhanced Fujita scale
- Max width: 900 yards (0.51 mi; 0.82 km)
- Path length: 28.28 miles (45.51 km)
- Highest winds: 205 mph (330 km/h)

Overall effects
- Fatalities: 3
- Injuries: 8
- Damage: $1.1 million (2011 USD)
- Areas affected: Neshoba, Kemper, Winston, and Noxubee counties in Mississippi
- Part of the 2011 Super Outbreak and Tornadoes of 2011

During the afternoon hours of April 27, 2011, an extremely powerful and fast-moving EF5 multi-vortex tornado, known commonly as the Philadelphia, Mississippi tornado or the Philadelphia EF5, touched down in eastern Mississippi causing catastrophic damage to the northern outskirts of the town of Philadelphia. Part of the historic 2011 Super Outbreak, the largest tornado outbreak on record, this was both the first of four EF5 tornadoes to touch down that day and the first violent tornado of the outbreak. it would also be the first such storm in Mississippi since the 1966 Candlestick Park tornado. during its 30 minutes lifetime, it traveled along a 28.28-mile (45.51 km) path through four counties, leaving behind three deaths, eight injuries, and $1.1 million in damage.

The supercell thunderstorm that produced this tornado formed around 1:00 p.m. CDT south of Jackson, Mississippi. Traveling briskly to the northeast, it became severe within 25 minutes and potentially tornadic by 1:36 p.m. CDT. The tornado finally touched down at 2:30 p.m. CDT just east of the Philadelphia Municipal Airport. It quickly intensified and began producing EF5 damage by 2:38 pm. CDT; extreme ground scouring, up to .5 metres (1.6 ft) deep in places, occurred in northeastern Neshoba County. After crossing into Kemper County, the tornado obliterated a mobile home, killing all three inside. It reached EF5 strength a second time near the Kemper–Winston county line where extreme ground scouring again took place and pavement was scoured from roads. Extensive tree damage took place elsewhere along the track and it ultimately dissipated at 3:00 p.m. CDT about 6 miles (9.7 km) north of Mashulaville.

== Meteorological synopsis ==
=== Setup ===
The environmental conditions leading up to the 2011 Super Outbreak were among the "most conducive to violent tornadoes ever documented". On April 25, a vigorous upper-level shortwave trough moved into the Southern Plains states. Ample instability, low-level moisture, and wind shear all fueled a significant tornado outbreak from Texas to Tennessee; at least 64 tornadoes touched down on this day. An area of low pressure consolidated over Texas on April 26 and traveled east while the aforementioned shortwave trough traversed the Mississippi and Ohio River valleys. Another 50 tornadoes touched down on this day. The multi-day outbreak culminated on April 27 with the most violent day of tornadic activity since the 1974 Super Outbreak. Multiple episodes of tornadic activity ensued with two waves of mesoscale convective systems in the morning hours followed by a widespread outbreak of supercells from Mississippi to North Carolina during the afternoon into the evening.

Tornadic activity on April 27 was precipitated by a 995 mbar (hPa; 29.39 inHg) surface low situated over Kentucky and a deep, negatively tilted (aligned northwest to southeast) trough over Arkansas and Louisiana. A strong southwesterly surface jet intersected these systems at a 60° angle, an ageostrophic flow that led to storm-relative helicity values in excess of 500 m^{2}s^{−2}—indicative of extreme wind shear and a very high potential for rotating updrafts within supercells. Ample moisture from the Gulf of Mexico was brought north across the Deep South, leading to daytime high temperatures of 77 to 81 °F (25 to 27 °C) and dewpoints of 66 to 72 °F (19 to 22 °C). Furthermore, convective available potential energy (CAPE) values reached 2,500–3,000 J/kg.

=== Forecast ===
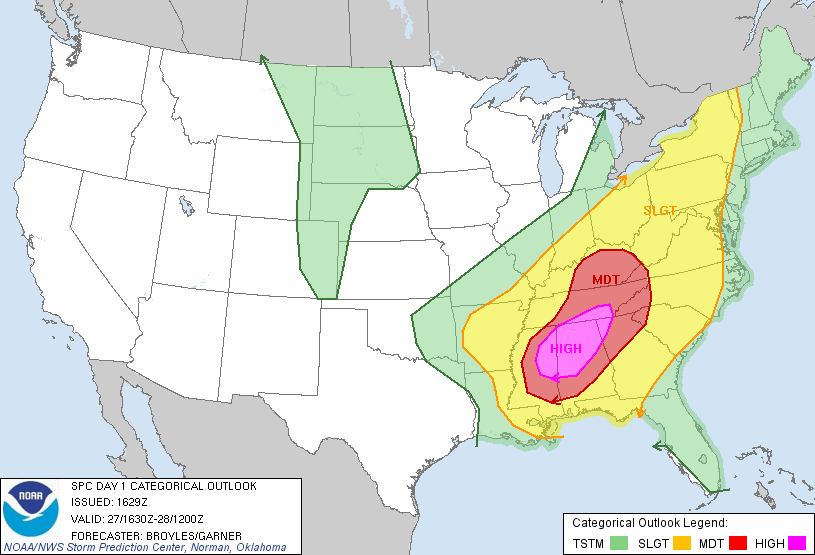
The National Weather Service Storm Prediction Center's Day 1 Convective Outlook for April 27, showing the Categorical Graphic

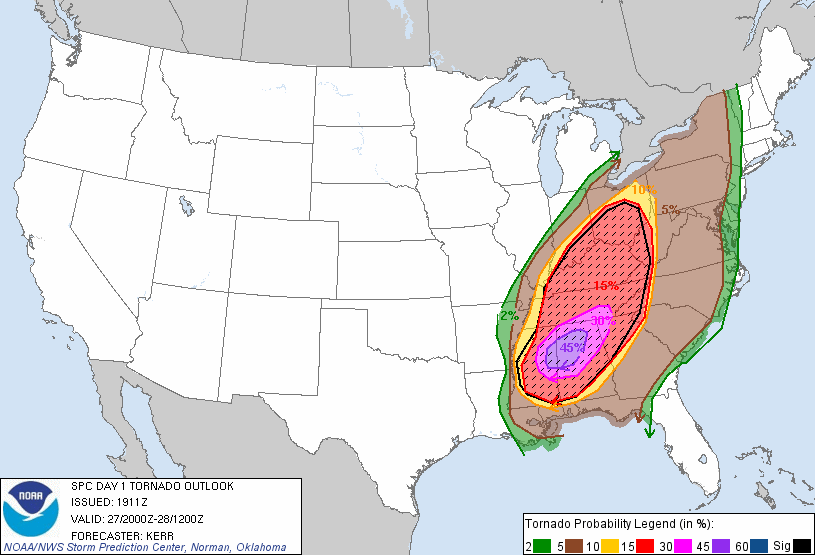
The probability of a tornado within 25 miles of a point (cross-hatched area: 10% or greater probability of EF2+ tornadoes)

On the morning of April 27, a strong cold front with several areas of embedded low pressure extended from the Texas Hill Country northeastward towards the Arklatex and the Ozarks, and later into the lower Ohio Valley. Warm moist air was in place due to strong southerly flow ahead of the front over Mississippi, Alabama, and Tennessee. An upper level disturbance sparked a broad area of showers and thunderstorms as it moved across the frontal boundary on the previous evening. The eastern edge of the line of showers and storms continued to move eastward, in concert with the upper disturbance, reaching the northwest Alabama border around 2:00 a.m. CDT.

This produced the last and most violent round of severe weather, which began around 2:30 p.m. CDT for northern Alabama and parts of Mississippi as supercells began to line up to the southwest of the area. During the early afternoon hours, the potential for destructive tornadoes was highlighted by the Storm Prediction Center's upgrade to a high risk for severe weather around 1:00 p.m. CDT. This prompted a particularly dangerous situation (PDS) tornado watch, which was issued for northern Alabama and portions of southern Tennessee at 1:45 p.m. CDT. The bulletin that accompanied the watch read:

THE NWS STORM PREDICTION CENTER HAS ISSUED A TORNADO WATCH FOR PORTIONS OF: MUCH OF ALABAMA, NORTHWEST GEORGIA, SOUTHEAST MISSISSIPPI, SOUTHERN MIDDLE TENNESSEE, EFFECTIVE THIS WEDNESDAY AFTERNOON AND EVENING FROM 145 PM UNTIL 1000 PM CDT.

...THIS IS A PARTICULARLY DANGEROUS SITUATION...

DESTRUCTIVE TORNADOES...LARGE HAIL TO 4 INCHES IN DIAMETER. THUNDERSTORM WIND GUSTS TO 80 MPH...AND DANGEROUS LIGHTNING ARE POSSIBLE IN THESE AREAS.

The potential for tornadoes ramped up from noon through 9:00 p.m. CDT. During this period, much of Alabama and Mississippi experienced numerous supercell thunderstorms that produced violent tornadoes, including four EF5 tornadoes, one being the Philadelphia tornado.

== Tornado summary ==
- Damage survey track of this tornado, as well as the tracks of other EF3+ tornadoes that occurred during 2011 Super Outbreak. (Interactive map, click or tap to view in detail); View mapdata Key EF0 65–85 mph (105–137 km/h); EF1 86–110 mph (138–177 km/h); EF2 111–135 mph (179–217 km/h); EF3 136–165 mph (219–266 km/h); EF4 166–200 mph (267–322 km/h); EF5 ≥201 mph (323 km/h)

=== Formation and rapid strengthening ===
Around 1:00 pm. CDT, a supercell thunderstorm developed south of Jackson, Mississippi, and traveled northeast at 55 mph (89 km/h). About 25 minutes later, the intensifying storm became severe and prompted a severe thunderstorm warning—advising residents of damaging winds in excess of 60 mph (97 km/h) and 1-inch (2.5 cm) diameter hail—from the National Weather Service office in Jackson for Leake, Rankin, and Scott counties. The developing storm gradually developed a hook echo signature, and a tornado warning was issued for Leake and Scott counties at 1:36 pm. CDT, and extended to Neshoba County at 2:03 pm. CDT. At 2:30 p.m. CDT, the storm produced a small tornado along the northern edge of Philadelphia, just east of Philadelphia Municipal Airport and near an Army National Guard armory. Here, large trees were downed and a building sustained significant roof damage. Within minutes, the tornado began producing EF2 damage to homes and other structures. It soon grew to 900 yards (820 m) in diameter and warranted the issuance of a tornado emergency for northeastern Neshoba County at 2:36 pm. CDT.

=== Northern Philadelphia and Neshoba–Kemper County ===
Traveling along and parallel to MS 21, the tornado leveled and partially swept away a brick home near the intersection with MS 491, indicative of low-end EF4 damage. A debris ball was apparent on Doppler weather radar imagery by this time. The storm began producing EF5 damage at 2:38 pm. CDT in northeastern Neshoba County. Tremendous ground scouring took place in the county, including in one field where the tornado dug a large trench into the ground, removing up to 1.6 feet (0.49 m) of soil in places. Grass was torn out by the roots and in clumps by suction vortices embedded within the tornado. Large trees were entirely uprooted, debarked, defoliated, and thrown up to 20 yards (18 m) as well. Maximum winds in the tornado were estimated at 205 mph (330 km/h). The storm moved through the Pearl River Resort, where it destroyed a historic log cabin, fencing, lighting, and dugouts at two baseball fields. As the storm neared the edge of Neshoba County, the tornado emergency was extended to include northern Kemper County, southeastern Winston County, and all of Noxubee County. The tornado weakened briefly as it passed through the small community of Coy along the Neshoba–Kemper County line. Some trees took some extensive damage and a mobile home was destroyed. Upon leaving the community, the tornado intensified and produced EF5 damage again by 2:47 pm. CDT. Throughout Neshoba County, the tornado damaged or destroyed 91 structures, leaving about 32 people homeless.

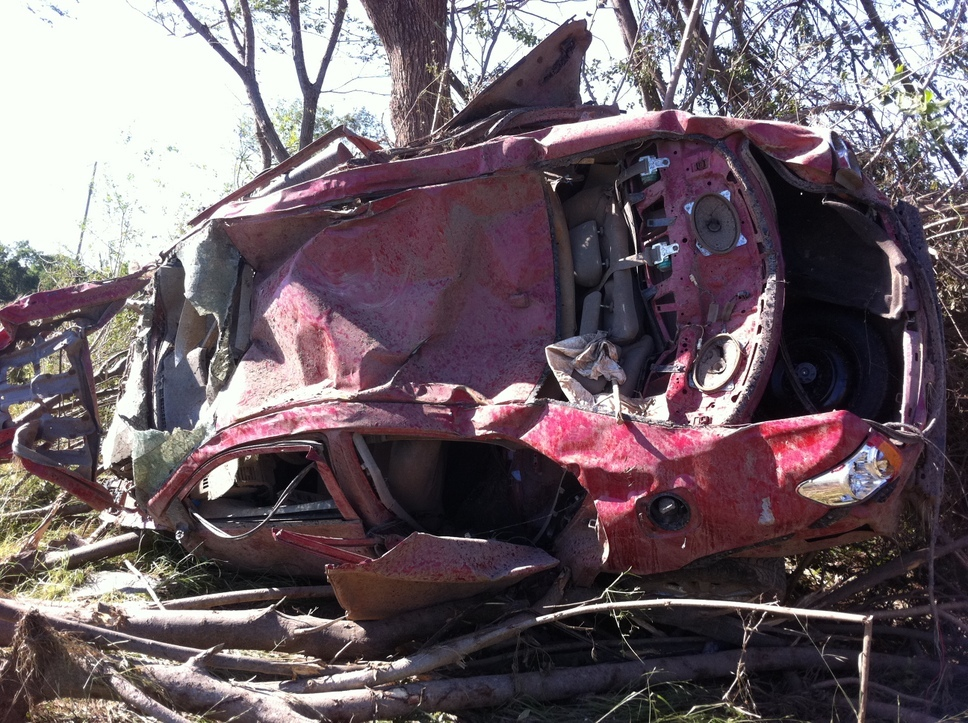
Remains of a car wrapped around a tree.

In Kemper County, a 3,000 sq-ft (280 m^{2}) mini-mart was damaged beyond repair. Eleven people sought refuge inside the building's bathroom when the tornado struck; all escaped without injuries. Along the Kemper-Winston County line, EF5 damage occurred as extremely deep ground scouring took place again and asphalt was ripped from roads. On Green Road, a double-wide mobile home, anchored to the ground, was lofted 300 yards (270 m) and obliterated when it landed in a nearby tree line; debris from the home was scattered hundreds of yards farther. The survey team found no evidence of it having bounced or rolled from where it was picked up to where it impacted the tree line. All three occupants were killed, the sole fatalities from this tornado. Nearby, the tornado weakened to EF3 strength as two brick homes were destroyed with barely any interior walls left standing; two people sustained serious injuries. A well-built frame wood home was nearly swept clean off its foundation and two trailers were destroyed. Cars were hurled hundreds of yards, often bouncing along the way, and some were rendered almost unrecognizable and were wrapped around trees. Continuing through southeastern Winston County, the tornado weakened slightly to EF2 strength but continued to produce extensive tree and property damage. As it crossed Central McDonald Road, it destroyed a single-wide mobile home and leveled a nearby grove of pine trees.

=== Weakening and dissipation ===
As the tornado approached the Winston–Noxubee border, it caused substantial roof damage to a church and left impact holes in the back wall. Extreme tree damage was noted along the border as the tornado regained EF3 intensity. Along Butler Road, to the southwest of Macon, additional pavement scouring took place, along with the destruction of a shop and a bus being rolled. Thereafter, the tornado steadily weakened before dissipating roughly 6 miles (9.7 km) north of Mashulaville at 3:00 pm. CDT. Throughout its 30-minute track, the tornado traveled 28.28 miles (45.51 km), killed three people, injured eight others, and caused $1.1 million in damage.

The supercell that produced this EF5 tornado later spawned an EF1 tornado in northeastern Noxubee County at 3:18 p.m. CDT. The parent storm dissipated around 3:29 p.m. CDT as another supercell overtook it near the Mississippi–Alabama state line. That cell produced an exceptionally long-lived EF4 tornado that traveled nearly 128 miles (206 km) across Alabama. The Philadelphia tornado marked the first instance of an F5 or EF5 tornado in Mississippi since the March 3, 1966, Candlestick Park tornado. Following another EF5 tornado that struck Smithville later on April 27, the outbreak marked the first known instance of two EF5 tornadoes on a single day in Mississippi.

== Aftermath ==
Immediately following the destructive tornadoes, Mississippi Governor Haley Barbour declared a state of emergency for 39 counties. On April 29, President Barack Obama signed a major disaster declaration for 29 Mississippi counties in the wake of the Super Outbreak and another deadly outbreak stretching from April 14th to April 16th, 2011. This allowed residents and some local governments to sign up to receive federal funding to repair damage incurred from the storms. More than 60 members of the Longino Baptist Church assisted residents of Neshoba County with debris removal and cleaning; also providing refreshments. The Salvation Army established a feeding center at the Coy Methodist Church. Disaster unemployment assistance was made available for people who lost their jobs due to storms and flooding, starting on May 17. By July, a total of $15,734,072 in federal funding was approved through the Federal Emergency Management Agency for victims of the April 15–28 storms.

== See also ==
- List of F5 and EF5 tornadoes
- List of tornadoes in the 2011 Super Outbreak
- List of United States tornado emergencies
- 1966 Jackson, Mississippi tornado - The last F/EF5 tornado in Mississippi before the Philadelphia tornado.
