= Tornado emergency =

Severe weather statement indicating an observed violent tornado in the warned area

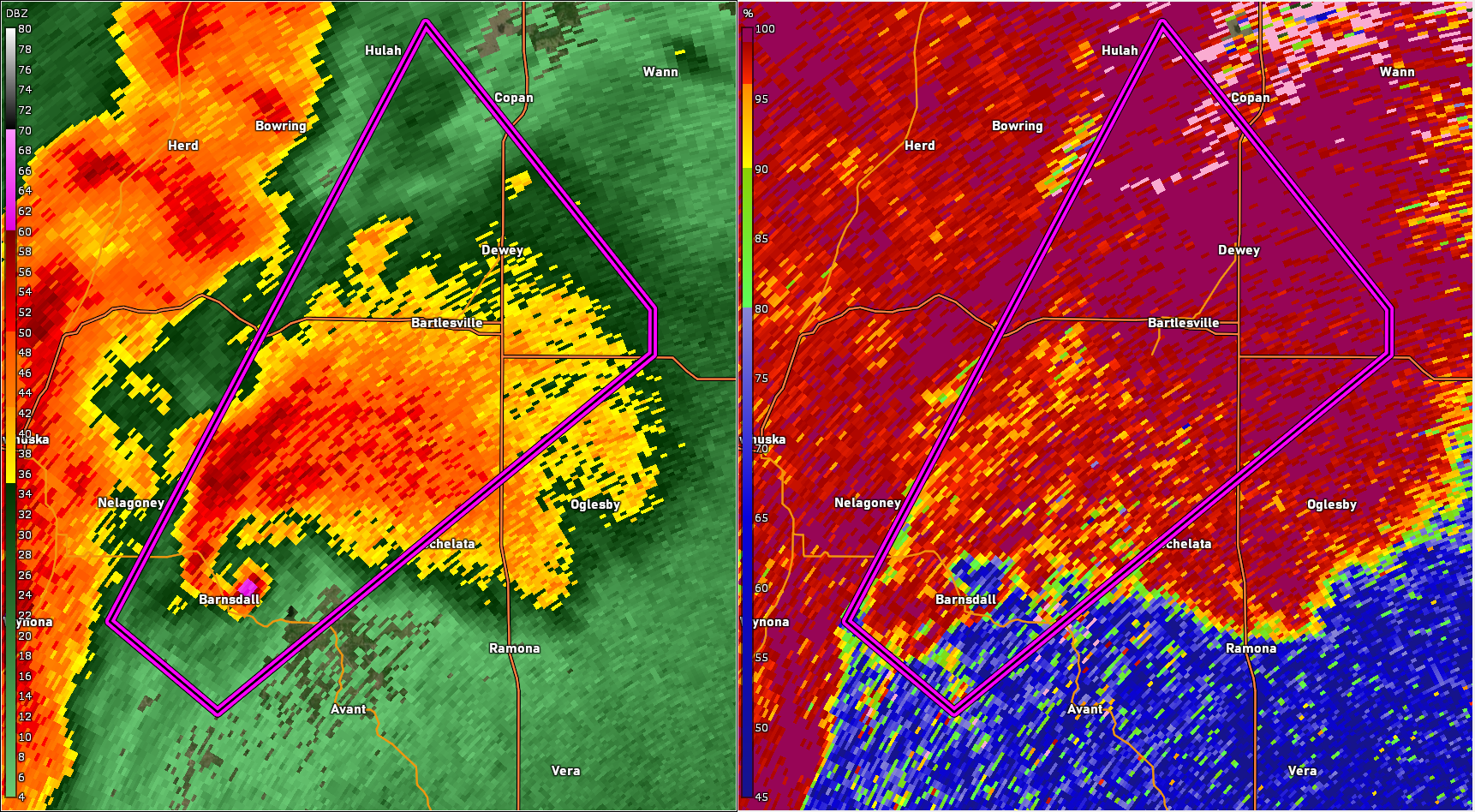
A tornado emergency issued for the 2024 Barnsdall-Bartlesville tornado.

A tornado emergency is an enhanced version of a tornado warning, which is used by the National Weather Service (NWS) in the United States during imminent, significant tornado occurrences. Although it is not a new warning type from the NWS, issued instead within a severe weather statement or in the initial tornado warning, a tornado emergency generally means that catastrophic, widespread damage is expected to occur and a high likelihood of numerous fatalities is expected with a large, strong to violent tornado.

These enhanced warnings are intended to convey the urgency of the weather situation to the general public, who are advised to take safety precautions immediately if they are in or near the projected path of a large tornado or its accompanying thunderstorm; tornado emergencies are usually identified following the preceding storm summary in the tornado warning product, which itself will denote visual or radar confirmation of "a large and extremely dangerous [or destructive] tornado" that is ongoing; precautionary action statements in the product also recommend that people in the storm's path find shelter in an underground shelter or safe room to protect themselves from the storm, if available.

While many tornadoes observed to be at or larger than ¼-mile in width have been documented to have produced catastrophic damage falling under the "strong" or "violent" categories (EF2–EF5) of the Enhanced Fujita Scale, there have been instances in which tornadoes of this intensity have resulted in very few to no fatalities and, occasionally, have produced damage corresponding to the Enhanced Fujita Scale's "weak" category (EF0–EF1).

The usage of tornado emergencies to alert major population centers to the imminent threat of a catastrophic tornado impact has also led to the development of the flash flood emergency which is similarly employed when severe flash floods threaten populated areas.

== History ==
=== First use ===
The term was first used during the May 3, 1999 tornado outbreak that spawned an F5 tornado which struck the municipalities of Bridge Creek and Moore, located just south of Oklahoma City, followed by southern and eastern parts of the city itself, Del City, and Midwest City. On that day, between 5:30 and 6:30 p.m., David Andra, the Science and Operations Officer at the National Weather Service Weather Forecast Office in Norman watched as the large, destructive tornado approached Oklahoma City. This led to the issuance of the first tornado emergency, which in this instance was released as a standalone weather statement issued separately from the original tornado warning.

SEVERE WEATHER STATEMENT  
NATIONAL WEATHER SERVICE NORMAN OK  
657 PM CDT MON MAY 3 1999  

...TORNADO EMERGENCY IN SOUTH OKLAHOMA CITY METRO AREA...  

AT 657 PM CDT...A LARGE TORNADO WAS MOVING ALONG INTERSTATE 44 WEST OF NEWCASTLE. ON ITS PRESENT PATH...THIS LARGE...DAMAGING TORNADO WILL ENTER SOUTHWEST SECTIONS OF THE OKLAHOMA CITY METRO AREA BETWEEN 715 PM AND 730 PM. PERSONS IN MOORE AND SOUTH OKLAHOMA CITY SHOULD TAKE IMMEDIATE TORNADO PRECAUTIONS.  

THIS IS AN EXTREMELY DANGEROUS AND LIFE THREATENING SITUATION. IF YOU ARE IN THE PATH OF THIS LARGE AND DESTRUCTIVE TORNADO...TAKE COVER IMMEDIATELY. 

DOPPLER RADAR HAS INDICATED THIS STORM MAY CONTAIN DESTRUCTIVE HAIL TO THE SIZE OF BASEBALLS...OR LARGER.  

As the large tornado approached western sections of the OKC metro area, we asked ourselves more than once, 'Are we doing all we can do to provide the best warnings and information?' It became apparent that unique and eye-catching phrases needed to be included in the products. At one point we used the phrase 'Tornado Emergency' to paint the picture that a rare and deadly tornado was imminent in the metro area. We hoped that such dire phrases would prompt action from anyone that still had any questions about what was about to happen.

=== Standardization and recent usage ===
Tornado Emergency Alabama
An audio example of a tornado emergency issued for Sumiton, Alabama, in 2010.

The prolific 2011 Super Outbreak set the all-time record for the most tornado emergencies issued by the National Weather Service during a 24-hour period. During the afternoon and early evening of April 27, 2011, which saw a record-breaking 216 tornadoes reported across the southeastern U.S., local NWS offices in Birmingham and Huntsville, Alabama, Memphis, Tennessee, and Jackson, Mississippi, issued a combined total of 16 tornado emergencies during the regional outbreak for multiple long-track tornadoes; among others, the emergency declarations covered the EF4 Tuscaloosa–Birmingham, Alabama tornado, and the EF5-rated Philadelphia and Smithville, Mississippi, and Hackleburg–Phil Campbell and Rainsville, Alabama, tornadoes. (The previous single-day record, 11, was set on May 7, 2003, during an outbreak of 18 tornadoes—among 30 reported that day across the central and southern United States that occurred as part of a broader nine-day outbreak sequence—that struck much of the same region affected by the 2011 outbreak.)

On April 2, 2012, the National Weather Service began an experimental program within its Wichita, Topeka, Springfield, St. Louis and Kansas City/Pleasant Hill offices in Kansas and Missouri called Impact Based Warning (IBW), which allows the respective offices to enhance warning information, such as adding tags to the warning messages which signify the potential damage severity. In regards to tornadoes, the creation of this multi-tiered system resulted in the implementation of an intermediate tornado warning product, a Particularly Dangerous Situation Tornado Warning.

On April 1, 2013, the IBW experiment expanded to include all National Weather Service WFOs within the Central Region; the IBW experiment was expanded again to include eight additional offices within the Eastern, Southern and Western Regions in the spring of 2014.

In 2016, Impact-Based Tornado Warnings were implemented nationwide and all offices began standardized training and practice for tornado emergencies. National directive allows for the use of tornado emergency products when a severe threat to human life exists and catastrophic damage is imminent or occurring.

The first tornado emergency ever issued in the Northeastern United States was issued by the National Weather Service in Mount Holly, New Jersey, on September 1, 2021, at 7:04 pm for Bristol, Croydon and Burlington when a confirmed large and destructive tornado was observed over Beverly heading towards the highly populated areas of Levittown, Trenton, and Hamilton Square. The alert for areas in Pennsylvania and New Jersey occurred as the remnants of Hurricane Ida passed through the region. The tornado was rated EF1.

On very rare occasions, tornado emergencies have been issued by local NWS offices that either do not verify a tornado touchdown in subsequent surveys or are based on false reports. One notable instance occurred on April 15, 2022, when the National Weather Service office in Little Rock, Arkansas, issued tornado emergencies for several communities across seven counties in north-central and northeastern parts of the state. (Note: Fulton County, Randolph County, Jackson County, Lawrence County, Sharp County, Greene County, and Craighead County, including the towns of Viola, Cherokee Village, Walnut Ridge and Bono.) Although strong rotation was detected in the storm as it crossed from south-central Missouri into north-central Arkansas, prompting tornado warnings for the supercell, surveys conducted that weekend by NWS Little Rock—which issued the initial emergency around 7:30 p.m. CDT, based on an emergency management report of a wedge tornado and damage to structures and trees near Hardy—indicated a tornado had not touched down and that damage produced by the storm was caused by straight-line winds and hail. The area where the emergencies were issued were within coverage “dead zones” in the radii of NEXRAD radars based in Little Rock, Springfield, Missouri, and Memphis, Tennessee; the supercell was within the highest beam tilt of each radar (ranging roughly 6,000–10,000 feet above ground level), impairing the ability of the radars to provide accurate wind velocity and correlation coefficient data, with large hail being produced by the storm contaminating the correlation coefficient data, producing lower values often indicative of lofted debris. The storm occurring at nightfall in a mostly rural area also complicated matters, with video taken by residents and posted on social media erroneously confusing a tube cloud that extended to near surface level for a tornado. Five days earlier, on April 11, NWS Little Rock issued a tornado emergency for Jacksonville and Cabot, based in part on reports of a large tornado on the ground in Jacksonville; although the storm—which was within 15 miles (24 km) of the Little Rock NEXRAD site—did produce an EF1 tornado, the report of a large tornado that prompted the emergency, along with several additional damage reports associated with the storm filed with the NWS’s Little Rock and Tulsa, Oklahoma, offices associated with that day’s convection, were later attributed to an Ohio woman who used a Spotter Network account with spoofed coordinates.

A similar situation occurred on May 24, 2024, when the NWS office in Shreveport, Louisiana issued a tornado emergency for Bowie County, Texas, where no tornado threat materialized. A brief EF1 tornado occurred to the north of New Boston, Texas, which had lifted before the upgrade to a tornado emergency occurred.

A more recent example of a tornado emergency issuance was for a strong EF3 tornado near Washburn, Illinois on June 11th, 2026, and the warning text stated:

BULLETIN - EAS ACTIVATION REQUESTED

Tornado Warning National Weather Service Lincoln IL 511 PM CDT Thu Jun 11 2026

...TORNADO EMERGENCY FOR LA ROSE...TOLUCA...WENONA...

The National Weather Service in Lincoln has issued a

Tornado Warning for... Eastern Marshall County in central Illinois...

Until 545 PM CDT.

At 510 PM CDT, a confirmed large and destructive tornado was observed over Washburn, or 8 miles southeast of Lacon, moving northeast at 40 mph.

TORNADO EMERGENCY for LA ROSE...TOLUCA...WENONA. This is a PARTICULARLY DANGEROUS SITUATION. TAKE COVER NOW!

HAZARD...Deadly tornado.

SOURCE...Emergency management confirmed tornado.

IMPACT...You are in a life-threatening situation. Flying debris may be deadly to those caught without shelter. Mobile homes will be destroyed. Considerable damage to homes, businesses, and vehicles is likely and complete destruction is possible.

Locations impacted include... Toluca, Wenona, Varna, and La Rose.

This includes Interstate 39 between mile markers 29 and 40.

PRECAUTIONARY/PREPAREDNESS ACTIONS... To repeat, a large, extremely dangerous and potentially deadly tornado is on the ground. To protect your life, TAKE COVER NOW! Move to an interior room on the lowest floor of a sturdy building. Avoid windows. If in a mobile home, a vehicle or outdoors, move to the closest substantial shelter and protect yourself from flying debris.

A large and extremely dangerous tornado is on the ground Take immediate tornado precautions. This is an emergency situation.

&&

LAT...LON 4093 8905 4093 8930 4097 8936 4111 8917 4110 8905

TIME...MOT...LOC 2210Z 242DEG 36KT 4096 8928

TORNADO...OBSERVED

TORNADO DAMAGE THREAT...CATASTROPHIC

MAX HAIL SIZE...2.00 IN

== Criteria ==
With the national implementation of Impact-Based tornado warnings in 2016, common criteria were established for the use of tornado emergency. National guidance requires the confirmation of a tornado via radar or spotter confirmation, with evidence the ongoing tornado is strong to violent.

Before usage, the following criteria must be met:

- A large and catastrophic tornado has been confirmed and will continue
- The tornado will have a high impact
- The tornado is expected to cause numerous fatalities.

The National Weather Service Weather Forecast Office in Jackson, Mississippi, defines a tornado emergency as "an enhanced Tornado Warning that will be issued by NWS Jackson when there is a heightened risk for a killer or violent tornado of EF3 rating or greater."

The National Weather Service office in Nashville, Tennessee, also created criteria to declare a tornado emergency within a tornado warning statement effective January 1, 2011. It states, "Tornado Emergency can be inserted in the third bulletin of the initial tornado warning (TOR) or in a severe weather statement (SVS)." Before the phrase can be used:

- A confirmed large tornado doing significant damage must be going through a highly populated area
- Radar must indicate tornadic debris
- The tornado must be expected to cause significant, widespread damage and loss of life.

== Tornado safety ==
It is recommended that people in the path of a large and violent tornado, whether referenced in a tornado warning or a tornado emergency, seek shelter in a basement, cellar or safe room, as stronger tornadoes (particularly those significant enough to warrant the inclusion of a tornado emergency declaration within a tornado warning) pose a significant risk of major injury or death for people above ground level. Those who do not have below-ground shelter are still advised to take cover in a room in the center of the home on the lowest floor, and cover themselves with some type of thick padding (such as mattresses or blankets), to protect against falling debris in the event that the roof and ceiling collapse.

== See also ==
- List of tornado emergencies
- Tornado warning
- List of tornadoes and tornado outbreaks
