= Leesburg, Mississippi =

- Unincorporated community
- Location within Mississippi Location within the United States
- Coordinates: 32°26′26″N 89°45′37″W
- Country: United States
- State: Mississippi
- County: Rankin
- Elevation: 371 ft (113 m)
- Time zone: UTC-6 (Central (CST))
  - Summer (DST): UTC-5 (CDT)
- Area codes: 601 & 769
- GNIS feature ID: 690919

Leesburg (also spelled Leesburgh), is an unincorporated community in Rankin County, Mississippi, United States.

In 1900, Leesburg had a population of 50.

A post office operated under the name Leesburgh from 1879 to 1890 and under Leesburg from 1900 to 1938.

Leesburg was once home to a school. In 1956, the school closed and its students were transferred to the school in Pisgah.

The Leesburg Baptist Church was one of the founding churches in the Rankin County Baptist Association.
