= Pleasant Ridge, Alabama =

Unincorporated community in Alabama, US

- Unincorporated community
- Location within Alabama Location within the United States
- Coordinates: 33°00′51″N 88°05′01″W
- Country: United States
- State: Alabama
- County: Greene
- Elevation: 305 ft (93 m)
- Time zone: UTC-6 (Central (CST))
  - Summer (DST): UTC-5 (CDT)
- Area codes: 205, 659
- GNIS feature ID: 155209

Pleasant Ridge, also known as Ridge, is an unincorporated community in Greene County, Alabama, United States. Pleasant Ridge is located on Alabama State Route 14, 17.2 miles (27.7 km) northwest of Eutaw.

== History ==
A post office operated under the name Pleasant Ridge from 1825 to 1918. On April 6, 1865, there was a skirmish between Union forces under the command of Brigadier General John T. Croxton and Confederate forces under the command of Brigadier-General William Wirt Adams near Pleasant Ridge. Croxton was leaving Tuscaloosa, having burned the University of Alabama on April 4. The 6th Kentucky Cavalry Regiment and the 2nd Michigan Volunteer Cavalry Regiment engaged with Adams' forces. Union casualties were three killed in action, eight wounded, sixty-eight captured. Adams's Confederate force suffered nine killed, twenty-five wounded, and one captured.
