= West End-Cobb Town, Alabama =

- Census-designated place
- Location within Alabama
- Coordinates: 33°39′08″N 85°52′40″W
- Country: United States
- State: Alabama
- County: Calhoun

Area
  - Total: 4.12 sq mi (10.68 km^{2})
  - Land: 4.12 sq mi (10.67 km^{2})
  - Water: 0.0039 sq mi (0.01 km^{2})
- Elevation: 728 ft (222 m)

Population (2020)
  - Total: 3,128
  - Density: 759.2/sq mi (293.13/km^{2})
- Time zone: UTC-6 (Central (CST))
  - Summer (DST): UTC-5 (CDT)
- ZIP code: 36201
- Area codes: 256 and 938
- FIPS code: 01-81084
- GNIS feature ID: 2403002

West End-Cobb Town is a census-designated place (CDP) and unincorporated community in Calhoun County, Alabama, United States. At the 2020 census, the population was 3,128. It is included in the Anniston-Oxford Metropolitan Statistical Area.

== Geography ==
West End-Cobb Town is located in southern Calhoun County. It is bordered to the east and south by the city of Anniston.

According to the U.S. Census Bureau, the CDP has a total area of 4.15 square miles (10.75 km^{2}), of which 0.004 square miles (0.01 km^{2}), or 0.06%, is water.

== Demographics ==
Historical population
Census	Pop.	Note	%±
1950	3,228		—
1960	5,485		69.9%
1970	5,515		0.5%
1980	5,189		−5.9%
1990	4,034		−22.3%
2000	3,924		−2.7%
2010	3,465		−11.7%
2020	3,128		−9.7%

=== Racial and ethnic composition ===
West End-Cobb Town CDP, Alabama – Racial and ethnic composition Note: the US Census treats Hispanic/Latino as an ethnic category. This table excludes Latinos from the racial categories and assigns them to a separate category. Hispanics/Latinos may be of any race.
Race / Ethnicity (NH = Non-Hispanic)	Pop 2000	Pop 2010	Pop 2020	% 2000	% 2010	% 2020
White alone (NH)	3,030	2,604	2,222	77.22%	75.15%	71.04%
Black or African American alone (NH)	784	723	614	19.98%	20.87%	19.63%
Native American or Alaska Native alone (NH)	24	17	16	0.61%	0.49%	0.51%
Asian alone (NH)	2	8	6	0.05%	0.23%	0.19%
Native Hawaiian or Pacific Islander alone (NH)	1	1	0	0.03%	0.03%	0.00%
Other race alone (NH)	0	1	7	0.00%	0.03%	0.22%
Mixed race or Multiracial (NH)	48	56	154	1.22%	1.62%	4.92%
Hispanic or Latino (any race)	35	55	109	0.89%	1.59%	3.48%
Total	3,924	3,465	3,128	100.00%	100.00%	100.00%

=== 2020 census ===
As of the 2020 census, West End-Cobb Town had a population of 3,128. The median age was 40.6 years. 20.7% of residents were under the age of 18 and 17.1% of residents were 65 years of age or older. For every 100 females there were 98.7 males, and for every 100 females age 18 and over there were 98.2 males age 18 and over.

97.1% of residents lived in urban areas, while 2.9% lived in rural areas.

There were 1,271 households in West End-Cobb Town, of which 28.6% had children under the age of 18 living in them. Of all households, 33.2% were married-couple households, 25.4% were households with a male householder and no spouse or partner present, and 31.9% were households with a female householder and no spouse or partner present. About 32.2% of all households were made up of individuals and 13.9% had someone living alone who was 65 years of age or older.

There were 1,545 housing units, of which 17.7% were vacant. The homeowner vacancy rate was 1.1% and the rental vacancy rate was 13.6%.

=== 2010 census ===
As of the census of 2010, there were 3,465 people, 1,381 households, and 938 families residing in the community. The population density was 322.7 inhabitants per square mile (124.6/km^{2}). There were 1,631 housing units at an average density of 393 per square mile (152/km^{2}). The racial makeup of the community was 76.1% White, 20.9% Black or African American, 0.5% Native American, 0.2% Asian, 0.0% Pacific Islander, 0.4% from other races, and 1.9% from two or more races. 1.6% of the population were Hispanic or Latino of any race.

There were 1,381 households, out of which 24.1% had children under the age of 18 living with them, 41.6% were married couples living together, 19.2% had a female householder with no husband present, and 32.1% were non-families. 28.2% of all households were made up of individuals, and 11.1% had someone living alone who was 65 years of age or older. The average household size was 2.51 and the average family size was 3.08.

In the community, the population was spread out, with 23.3% under the age of 18, 8.3% from 18 to 24, 24.4% from 25 to 44, 27.8% from 45 to 64, and 16.2% who were 65 years of age or older. The median age was 40.4 years. For every 100 females, there were 94.0 males. For every 100 females age 18 and over, there were 100.1 males.

The median income for a household in the community was $23,269, and the median income for a family was $30,469. Males had a median income of $26,438 versus $28,719 for females. The per capita income for the community was $13,201. About 24.5% of families and 28.3% of the population were below the poverty line, including 45.3% of those under age 18 and 14.1% of those age 65 or over.
