= Abernant, Alabama =

- Unincorporated community
- Location within Alabama Location within the United States
- Coordinates: 33°17′25″N 87°11′53″W
- Country: United States
- State: Alabama
- County: Tuscaloosa
- Elevation: 466 ft (142 m)
- Time zone: UTC-6 (Central (CST))
  - Summer (DST): UTC-5 (CDT)
- ZIP code: 35440
- Area codes: 205, 659
- GNIS feature ID: 112892

Abernant is an unincorporated community in Tuscaloosa County, Alabama, United States. Abernant is located along Alabama State Route 216, 3.6 miles (5.8 km) west of Lake View. Abernant has a post office with ZIP code 35440.

Shares a name with Welsh settlements of Abernant, Rhondda Cynon Taf, Abernant, Powys and Abernant, Carmarthenshire. In the Welsh language, “Aber” is translated as Estuary and “Nant” is translated as Stream.

== History ==
Abernant was named for a local family which also lent their name to a nearby coal company. A post office has been in operation at Abernant since 1902.

== Demographics ==
=== Abernant Census Division (1960-) ===
Historical population
Census	Pop.	Note	%±
1960	1,819		—
1970	1,958		7.6%
1980	3,064		56.5%
1990	4,398		43.5%
2000	7,013		59.5%
2010	9,955		42.0%
U.S. Decennial Census

Abernant village has never reported a population figure separately on the U.S. Census as an unincorporated community. However, the census division formed in 1960 was named for Abernant (superseding the former name of Parsons-Yolande, Precinct 12 of Tuscaloosa County).
