= Wind Creek State Park =

State park in Alabama, United States

- Location within Alabama
- Location: Tallapoosa County, Alabama, United States
- Coordinates: 32°51′47″N 85°56′02″W
- Area: 1,445 acres (585 ha)
- Elevation: 617 ft (188 m)
- Administrator: Alabama Department of Conservation and Natural Resources
- Website: Official website

Wind Creek State Park is a public recreation area located seven miles (11 km) south of Alexander City, Alabama, on the western side of Lake Martin, a 41,000-acre (17,000 ha) reservoir on the Tallapoosa River. The state park occupies 1,445 acres (585 ha) and is managed by the Alabama Department of Conservation and Natural Resources.

== Activities and amenities ==
The park offers boating, fishing, swimming, picnicking, hiking and equestrian trails, a large camping area, and rental cabins. A grain silo built in 1915 that sits on the edge of the lake is topped by a viewing platform and has a nature center in its base.

The park has equestrian trails totalling over 20 miles (32 km) and two hiking trails that total more than 5 miles (8.0 km) in length. Its trail system was designated as a National Recreation Trail in 2011. The park has nearly 600 camping sites in one of the largest state-owned campgrounds in the United States. Park events include fishing competitions and skiing/wake-boarding shows. The park also has multiple playgrounds.
