= National Weather Service Little Rock, Arkansas =

National Weather Service Little Rock, Arkansas is a local weather forecast office responsible for monitoring weather conditions for 47 of Arkansas's 75 counties, excluding 7 counties in Northwestern Arkansas, 9 counties in Southwestern and South Central Arkansas, Ashley and Chicot counties in Extreme Southeastern Arkansas, and 14 counties in Eastern Arkansas. Those counties are monitored by the Weather Service offices in Tulsa, Shreveport, Jackson (MS), and Memphis respectively. The current office in North Little Rock maintains a WSR-88D (NEXRAD) radar system and Advanced Weather Interactive Processing System (AWIPS) that greatly improve forecasting in the region. North Little Rock is in charge of weather forecasts, warnings and local statements as well as aviation weather. The name of the Doppler weather radar (WSR-88D) code used by this office is LZK. The National Weather Service at North Little Rock, Arkansas programs 12 NOAA Weather Radio transmitters across Arkansas, with 25 transmitters statewide.

== NWS NLR Team ==
- Meteorologist-in-Charge (MIC) - Dennis Cavanaugh (Acting)
- Administrative Support Assistant (ASA) - Vacant
- Warning Coordination Meteorologist (WCM) - Dennis Cavanaugh
- Science and Operations Officer (SOO) - Christopher Buonanno
- Electronic Systems Administrator (ESA) - Gary Heifner
- Information Technology Officer (ITO) - Daniel Koch
- Service Hydrologist - Tabitha Clarke
- Observations Program Leader - Sean Clarke
- 6 Senior Forecasters
- 6 Meteorologist/Forecasters
- 1 Electronics Technician

== Terminal Aerodrome Forecast (TAF) Sites served by this office ==
- KADF - Dexter B. Florence Memorial Field
- KBPK - Ozark Regional Airport
- KHOT - Memorial Field Airport
- KHRO - Boone County Airport
- KLIT - Clinton National Airport
- KLLQ - Monticello Municipal Airport (Ellis Field)
- KPBF - Grider Field

== NOAA Weather Radio Stations served by this office ==
- KXI91 - Morrilton, 162.475 MHz
- KXI92 - High Peak, 162.425 MHz
- KXI96 - Russell-Russell Mtn., 162.400 MHz
- KXI97 - Mena-Eagle Mtn., 162.400 MHz
- WNG639 - Cherokee Village-Agnos, 162.475 MHz
- WWF96 - Russellville, 162.525 MHz
- WWG54 - Yellville-Rea Valley, 162.500 MHz
- WXJ48 - Gurdon, 162.475 MHz
- WXJ54 - Star City, 162.400 MHz
- WXJ55 - Little Rock-Shinall Mtn., 162.500 MHz
- WXL66 - Mountain View, 162.450 MHz
- WXN92 - Harrison, 162.525 MHz
