= Pisgah, Mississippi =

- Unincorporated community
- Location within Mississippi Location within the United States
- Coordinates: 32°28′12″N 89°52′12″W
- Country: United States
- State: Mississippi
- County: Rankin
- Elevation: 364 ft (111 m)
- Time zone: UTC-6 (Central (CST))
  - Summer (DST): UTC-5 (CDT)
- Area codes: 601 & 769
- GNIS feature ID: 675928

Pisgah is an unincorporated community in Rankin County, Mississippi, United States.

A post office operated under the name Pisgah from 1897 to 1921.

Pisgah High School and Pisgah Elementary School serve the community as part of the Rankin County School District.

The Mount Pisgah Association was founded at Mount Pisgah Baptist Church in 1837.
