= Quincy, Mississippi =

- Unincorporated community
- Location within Mississippi Location within the United States
- Coordinates: 33°54′35″N 88°22′01″W
- Country: United States
- State: Mississippi
- County: Monroe
- Elevation: 387 ft (118 m)
- Time zone: UTC-6 (Central (CST))
  - Summer (DST): UTC-5 (CDT)
- Area code: 662
- GNIS feature ID: 692163

Quincy is an unincorporated community in Monroe County, Mississippi, United States.

Quincy is located approximately 8 miles east of Amory on U.S. Route 278.

== History ==
Quincy is located along the BNSF Railway.

In 1900, Quincy had a church and population of 32.

A post office operated under the name Quincy from 1827 to 1956.
