= Abernant, Powys =

Coordinates: 52.566133°N 3.219816°W

Abernant
- Location within Powys
- OS grid reference: SO 174 972
  - Cardiff: 75 mi (121 km)
  - London: 150.4 mi (242.0 km)
- Community: Aberriw
- Principal area: Powys
- Country: Wales
- Sovereign state: United Kingdom
- Post town: Montgomery
- Postcode district: SY15
- Police: Dyfed-Powys
- Fire: Mid and West Wales
- Ambulance: Welsh
- UK Parliament: Montgomeryshire and Glyndŵr
- Senedd Cymru – Welsh Parliament: Montgomeryshire

Abernant is a hamlet near Montgomery, Powys and is 75 miles (121 km) from Cardiff and 150 miles (242 km) from London.

The spring forms above Abernant, near the summit of Banc y Celyn (472m), and runs through Abernant to join the River Wye. There is a large adventure centre, a branch of Manor Adventure, that operates from an old hotel in Abernant.

There is also a mine in the hills outside the village.

== See also ==
- List of localities in Wales by population
