= Tornado outbreak of April 13–15, 2019 =

Severe weather effect in the Southeastern United States

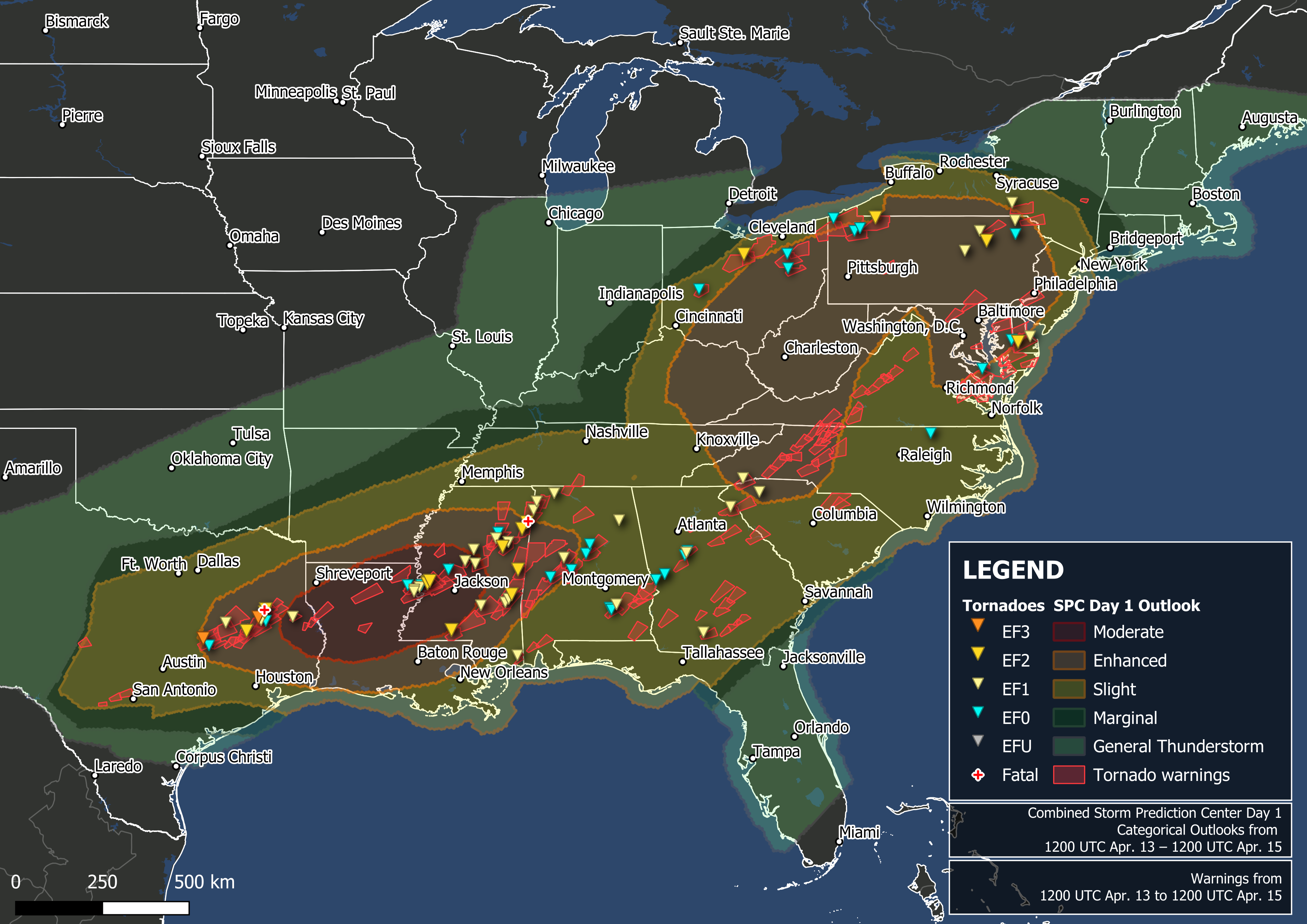
- Map of tornado warnings and confirmed tornadoes during the outbreak (from April 13–15)

Meteorological history
- Duration: April 13–15, 2019

Tornado outbreak
- Tornadoes: 75
- Max. rating: EF3 tornado
- Duration: 40 hours, 17 minutes
- Highest winds: Tornadic – 182 mph (293 km/h) in Greenwood Springs, Mississippi EF2 on April 13 (unofficial academic/published analysis); Straight-line – 80 mph (130 km/h) near McKean, Pennsylvania on April 14
- Largest hail: 3 in (7.6 cm) in Bexar County, Texas on April 13

Overall effects
- Fatalities: 3 (+6 non-tornadic)
- Injuries: 53 injuries
- Damage: $1.4 billion (2019 USD)
- Areas affected: Midwestern, Northeastern, Southeastern United States
- Part of the Tornadoes of 2019

A significant severe weather and tornado outbreak affected multiple regions of the Eastern United States in mid-April 2019. Over the course of 40 hours, 75 tornadoes touched down. The outbreak produced numerous strong tornadoes throughout portions of the Deep South, while additional significant tornadoes occurred as far north as Ohio, Pennsylvania, and Delaware. The most significant tornado of the event was a long-tracked, high-end EF3 tornado that struck Alto, Texas and killed two people. Numerous weak tornadoes were also confirmed, along with numerous reports of hail and damaging straight line winds.

A total of nine people were killed during this outbreak of severe weather. Three fatalities occurred as a result of the tornadoes that struck Alto, Texas and Hamilton, Mississippi. In addition, six other non-tornadic fatalities were also associated with this storm event. On April 13, two children aged 3 and 8 were killed in Pollok, Texas after a tree fell on and crushed the vehicle they were riding in. In Louisiana, two more people were killed as a result of flash flooding in Monroe and Bawcomville. On April 14, a rescue worker in Alabama was struck by a vehicle while clearing debris off a roadway, killing him. An additional fatality occurred on April 15 when a tree fell on a home in Stafford, Virginia, killing an occupant.

== Meteorological synopsis ==
=== April 13 ===
The first indications for an organized severe weather event came on April 9, when the Storm Prediction Center (SPC) outlined a risk area across much of the Ark-La-Tex region. The following day, a broader region for severe thunderstorms was introduced, with a heightened threat level across far eastern Texas into western Mississippi. A day 3 enhanced risk was outlined across those same regions on April 11, although SPC noted concerns about system timing and the availability of instability as numerous storms developed. As weather models came into broad consensus with regard to the potential for discrete supercell thunderstorms and a succeeding squall line, confidence in a significant severe weather outbreak increased, prompting the SPC to issue a day 2 moderate risk across far eastern Texas, northern Louisiana, southeastern Arkansas, and far western Mississippi. The moderate risk was extended eastward on the morning of April 13, and SPC forecasters contemplated issuing a high risk for portions of the area. Ultimately, however, lingering concerns about the longevity of discrete storms precluded such an upgrade.

Progression of tornadoes and tornado warnings across the Eastern United States between April 13–April 15

The synoptic scale setup was expected to come together as a vigorous upper-level trough pushed eastward across the Southwest United States into the Southern Plains, developing a closed 500mb low near the Dallas–Fort Worth metroplex late on April 13. At the surface, a primary area of low pressure was forecast to develop near San Angelo, Texas, supporting a trailing cold front across central Texas as well as a lifting warm front across the Ark-La-Tex region. Within the warm sector of this low-pressure system, dew points were expected to rise into the upper-60s to near 70 °F, with precipitable water values in excess of 1.5 in (38 mm) and generally low cloud bases. Steep lapse rates were forecast to contribute to mid-level Convective Available Potential Energy (CAPE) values of 2,500–3,000 J/kg across eastern Texas, with slightly lower values of 1,000–2,000 J/kg over portions of Louisiana and Mississippi. Intense speed and directional shear throughout the entirety of the atmosphere led to large, looping hodographs, and effective storm relative helicity values ranging from 250 to 600 J/kg along and south of the aforementioned warm front as depicted by forecast atmospheric soundings. The culmination of these ingredients was forecast to support an outbreak of supercell thunderstorms across the Moderate risk, with the potential for strong to violent (EF2+) tornadoes with the most sustained cells, followed by the development of an eastward-progressing squall line overnight. As the event itself unfolded, numerous supercell thunderstorms and embedded semi-discrete supercell structures overspread the threat area, resulting in numerous strong tornadoes.

=== April 14–15 ===
On April 10, the SPC noted the potential for organized severe weather farther east across the United States, encompassing portions of Alabama, Georgia, South Carolina, and Florida in their day 5 threat area valid for April 14. Minimal changes were made in the next day's outlook, before the outlook was expanded northward into the Ohio Valley, including the introduction of an enhanced risk from central Alabama and Georgia into southern Ohio. Into April 14, as a line of severe thunderstorms shifted eastward across the Southern United States, this Enhanced risk was pushed north to encompass more of the Ohio Valley and portions of the Mid-Atlantic states. This included a large 5% risk area for tornadoes. There, cool morning temperatures were expected to give way to sufficient destabilization, characterized by mid-level CAPE values around 500–1,000 J/kg. Despite an intense low-level jet, dewpoints were only expected to rise into the upper 50s to near 60 °F, mitigating a more substantial tornado threat as severe thunderstorm clusters were forecast to congeal into a squall line overnight. While storm mode during the event was mostly linear, several supercell thunderstorms did develop, resulting in a few significant tornadoes. Numerous circulations and semi-discrete supercell structures embedded within the line of storms produced numerous weak tornadoes as well. Tornado activity continued throughout portions of the Northeastern United States into the early morning hours of April 15 before the outbreak came to an end. One tornado in the Northeast, an EF2 in Delaware, became the strongest tornado in the state since 2004.

== Confirmed tornadoes ==
Confirmed tornadoes by Enhanced Fujita rating
EFU	EF0	EF1	EF2	EF3	EF4	EF5	Total
0	26	31	16	2	0	0	75

=== April 13 event ===
List of confirmed tornadoes – Saturday, April 13, 2019 (Note: All dates are based on the local time zone where the tornado touched down; however, all times are in Coordinated Universal Time for consistency.)
EF#	Location	County / Parish	State	Start Coord.	Time (UTC)	Path length	Max width
EF3	NW of Hearne to Franklin to SSW of Marquez	Milam, Robertson, Leon	TX	30.8832°N 96.6999°W	15:50–16:45	32.48 mi (52.27 km)	250 yd (230 m)
EF3	See section on this tornado						
EF1	NW of Ratcliff to SSW of Alto	Houston	TX	31.3846°N 95.202°W	16:26–16:37	8.9 mi (14.3 km)	200 yd (180 m)
EF1	This tornado snapped and uprooted trees and severely damaged a double-wide mobile home, pushing it into a wooded area. Four of its occupants were injured but later released from the hospital.						
EF2	SSW of Alto	Cherokee	TX	31.5612°N 95.1042°W	16:46–16:48	0.8 mi (1.3 km)	400 yd (370 m)
EF2	This tornado initially snapped hundreds of trees before destroying two mobile homes and tearing the roof off of a house. Several vehicles were tossed and damaged as well.						
EF2	Alto	Cherokee	TX	31.6405°N 95.0805°W	16:52–17:00	2.5 mi (4.0 km)	400 yd (370 m)
EF2	This tornado struck Alto after the previous event lifted. Several homes were significantly damaged in town, including one home that was shifted off of its foundation and largely destroyed. It then passed over the Alto ISD campus, where a gymnasium sustained collapse of a masonry exterior wall. The roofs of other structures on campus were also damaged. Trees were snapped or uprooted as well. The EF3 tornado that hit Alto a couple hours later crossed the damage path of this tornado.						
EF1	E of Buffalo to SE of Jewett	Leon	TX	31.3242°N 96.1165°W	17:12–17:19	11.22 mi (18.06 km)	150 yd (140 m)
EF1	This tornado ripped small portions of roofing material off of two houses and snapped trees.						
EF0	SSE of Hearne	Robertson	TX	30.7303°N 96.5496°W	17:14–17:19	2.3 mi (3.7 km)	50 yd (46 m)
EF0	A weak tornado was caught on video over open farmland. No damage was reported.						
EF2	W of Lovelady	Houston	TX	31.0789°N 95.5773°W	17:20–17:24	6.03 mi (9.70 km)	100 yd (91 m)
EF2	A house had its metal roof torn off, with roofing scattered up to 100 yd (91 m) away. A double-wide mobile home was completely destroyed, trees were snapped and denuded, and vehicles were tossed and damaged.						
EF3	ENE of Crockett to NE of Reklaw	Houston, Cherokee, Nacogdoches, Rusk	TX	31.428°N 95.2718°W	18:00–19:00	41.13 mi (66.19 km)	880 yd (800 m)
EF3	2 deaths – See section on this tornado – 20 people were injured.						
EF0	SE of Ratcliff	Houston	TX	31.367°N 95.079°W	18:45–18:47	0.16 mi (0.26 km)	50 yd (46 m)
EF0	Tornado occurred in the Davy Crockett National Forest, however the full path is unknown.						
EF1	SW of Chireno	Nacogdoches	TX	31.4732°N 94.3811°W	19:38–19:39	0.77 mi (1.24 km)	100 yd (91 m)
EF1	This tornado uprooted numerous trees in a heavily wooded area.						
EF1	E of Newellton to N of Gilbert	Tensas	LA	32.1768°N 91.2305°W	21:04–21:30	17.25 mi (27.76 km)	1,230 yd (1,120 m)
EF1	A large, rain-wrapped, high-end EF1 wedge tornado destroyed one mobile home while rolling a second. An empty fertilizer tank and farm equipment tires were lofted a considerable distance. An older home had its roof ripped off and several other houses suffered lesser roof damage as well. Some outbuildings and mobile homes were damaged, including a few that were pushed off their cinder blocks. Many trees were snapped or uprooted.						
EF1	N of Newellton	Tensas	LA	32.1284°N 91.2393°W	21:13–21:19	4.98 mi (8.01 km)	950 yd (870 m)
EF1	Trees and power poles were snapped.						
EF1	SW of Mound	Madison	LA	32.2438°N 91.097°W	21:35–21:38	0.97 mi (1.56 km)	840 yd (770 m)
EF1	Several trees were snapped or uprooted, and some tree limbs fell onto an outbuilding.						
EF0	SSW of Mound	Madison	LA	32.2916°N 91.0522°W	21:44–21:50	2.81 mi (4.52 km)	50 yd (46 m)
EF0	Trained storm spotters observed a tornado. No damage occurred.						
EF2	Northeastern Vicksburg to SSW of Phoenix	Warren, Yazoo	MS	32.3737°N 90.8291°W	21:57–22:43	20.2 mi (32.5 km)	700 yd (640 m)
EF2	This was the first of three strong tornadoes that touched down in Vicksburg. Numerous trees were snapped or uprooted in subdivisions at the northeastern edge of town, some of which fell on homes and power lines. The most intense damage occurred farther along the path, where several power poles and numerous large trees were snapped at their bases.						
EF2	Southern Vicksburg	Warren	MS	32.309°N 90.8909°W	22:04–22:15	4.33 mi (6.97 km)	440 yd (400 m)
EF2	This was the second of three strong tornadoes that touched down in Vicksburg. At the beginning of the path, plants and materials were damaged at a Walmart. A strip mall had much of its roof torn off and its front windows and doors blown outward. A large metal Taco Bell sign pole was bent over nearby. The roof of another business, the canopy of a Kroger gas station, a nearby sign, and several trees were damaged as well.						
EF2	Vicksburg	Warren	MS	32.34°N 90.88°W	22:08–22:16	2.44 mi (3.93 km)	175 yd (160 m)
EF2	This tornado struck Vicksburg immediately after the previous one. The roof of a home was ripped off, collapsing the front facade of the structure. A small business building suffered minor roof damage. Numerous trees were snapped and uprooted, one of which caused extensive damage to a home upon falling.						
EF0	NW of Bentonia	Yazoo	MS	32.6992°N 90.347°W	23:00–23:06	2.92 mi (4.70 km)	25 yd (23 m)
EF0	A few trees were snapped and uprooted.						
EF1	S of Goodman	Attala, Holmes	MS	32.9184°N 89.9163°W	23:42–23:44	1.55 mi (2.49 km)	100 yd (91 m)
EF1	A brief tornado snapped trees in the Big Black River bottom.						
EF1	ENE of West	Attala	MS	33.2165°N 89.6931°W	00:06–00:07	0.51 mi (0.82 km)	50 yd (46 m)
EF1	Numerous trees were snapped and a power pole was broken as well.						
EF0	SSE of Delhi	Madison	LA	32.2927°N 91.4037°W	00:09–00:16	4.43 mi (7.13 km)	50 yd (46 m)
EF0	A tornado debris signature was evident on radar.						
EF1	NW of Redwater	Leake	MS	32.8523°N 89.6516°W	00:35–00:43	4.86 mi (7.82 km)	300 yd (270 m)
EF1	Numerous trees were snapped and uprooted.						
EF2	W of Tylertown	Pike, Walthall	MS	31.1005°N 90.2688°W	01:12–01:21	4.41 mi (7.10 km)	150 yd (140 m)
EF2	A strong, multiple-vortex tornado caused major tree damage as it moved through heavily forested areas.						
EF1	Mathiston	Choctaw, Webster	MS	33.5069°N 89.1165°W	02:08–02:15	2.66 mi (4.28 km)	400 yd (370 m)
EF1	A tornado touched down to the south of Mathison, where a small shed was damaged and numerous trees and tree limbs were snapped. One tree fell on and destroyed a truck. Additional tree limbs were snapped in Mathison before the tornado dissipated.						
EF0	S of Mantee	Webster	MS	33.6543°N 89.0586°W	02:26–02:27	0.34 mi (0.55 km)	100 yd (91 m)
EF0	A weak, brief tornado uprooted several trees, with one falling on a shed. A utility pole was bent over as well.						
EF1	SW of Taylorsville	Covington, Smith	MS	31.7685°N 89.506°W	02:39–02:46	4.1 mi (6.6 km)	250 yd (230 m)
EF1	One mobile home lost its skirting while a second had its porch covering and tin roof ripped off. Debris from the second home was tossed into a third mobile home, causing the door to fly open and resulting in one injury. A carport and some of the tin roof of one home was removed, while a metal shed had its roof ripped off too.						
EF2	SE of Sturgis to SSW of Starkville	Winston, Oktibbeha	MS	33.2596°N 88.9459°W	02:55–03:10	8.81 mi (14.18 km)	830 yd (760 m)
EF2	A tornado snapped and uprooted numerous trees, with several falling on a house, truck, and camper. More were blown down on a horse barn, which was destroyed. At peak intensity, the tornado snapped almost a dozen power poles, caused significant tree damage, and completely destroyed a mobile home. Many houses sustained roof damage due to both wind and falling trees, and a church had moderate shingle damage.						
EF1	Southeastern Starkville	Oktibbeha	MS	33.4105°N 88.7961°W	03:18–03:26	4.46 mi (7.18 km)	400 yd (370 m)
EF1	This tornado snapped and uprooted several trees throughout its path, including at the Mississippi State University campus. Several homes sustained roof and shingle damage, one of which had a tree fall on it.						
EF2	SW of Hamilton to WSW of Greenwood Springs	Monroe	MS	33.7248°N 88.4409°W	04:06–04:23	11.3 mi (18.2 km)	800 yd (730 m)
EF2	1 death – This strong tornado rapidly developed and intensified before striking Hamilton at high-end EF2 strength, causing major damage to homes and other structures. Several frame homes were left with only interior rooms standing, and mobile homes were destroyed, along with a fire station building. A mechanic shop, apartment complex, self-storage building, local clinic, and the Monroe County Morgue were all damaged or destroyed. Power lines were downed, and outbuildings were destroyed as well. A tree fell on a mobile home outside of Hamilton, killing the occupant. Elsewhere, minor structural damage occurred, and trees were snapped or uprooted along the path. 19 people were injured.						
EF2	SE of De Kalb	Kemper	MS	32.6688°N 88.5451°W	04:19–04:31	8.43 mi (13.57 km)	700 yd (640 m)
EF2	Numerous large trees were uprooted or snapped near their bases, some of which fell on hunting cabins and mobile homes, causing minor or moderate damage. A large outbuilding had its tin roof peeled off, with sheet metal strewn downwind and wrapped around trees.						
EF2	W of Greenwood Springs to E of Smithville	Monroe	MS	33.8931°N 88.3215°W	04:22–04:39	13.2 mi (21.2 km)	800 yd (730 m)
EF2	This tornado tracked through wooded areas and downed numerous trees. A few homes sustained roof damage as well. In a later analysis, published in the Monthly Weather Review, it was noted “this tornado produced forest devastation and electrical infrastructure damage up to at least EF4 intensity”. Near the end of the report, it was stated that this was “a violent tornado, potentially even EF5 intensity.”						
EF1	SE of Vossburg	Clarke	MS	31.848°N 88.8748°W	04:36–04:46	7.03 mi (11.31 km)	300 yd (270 m)
EF1	Several trees were snapped or uprooted. A private property suffered roof damage. Two metal high tension power line V-trusses were toppled. A chain link fence was downed as well.						
EF1	W of De Soto	Clarke	MS	31.938°N 88.7868°W	04:48–04:52	4.57 mi (7.35 km)	200 yd (180 m)
EF1	A home sustained minor shingle damage and numerous trees were snapped or uprooted. One tree was blown over onto an old church building, causing the structure to collapse.						
EF2	E of Quitman	Clarke	MS	32.0247°N 88.7102°W	04:55–05:12	6.09 mi (9.80 km)	400 yd (370 m)
EF2	A strong tornado completely mowed down dozens of trees in a heavily wooded area. Seven to nine power poles were broken as well.						
EF1	SW of Shottsville	Marion	AL	34.2415°N 88.1425°W	04:57–04:59	1.21 mi (1.95 km)	440 yd (400 m)
EF1	Dozens of trees were uprooted, and the tin was partially torn off a small barn.						

=== April 14 event ===
List of confirmed tornadoes – Sunday, April 14, 2019
EF#	Location	County / Parish	State	Start Coord.	Time (UTC)	Path length	Max width
EF1	NE of Red Bay	Franklin	AL	34.4617°N 88.0607°W	05:14–05:26	6.31 mi (10.15 km)	80 yd (73 m)
EF1	A barn and a wooden outbuilding were damaged, and a tree was blown over onto a house. Tin from a nearby outbuilding was scattered several hundred yards away. Throughout its path, this tornado snapped and uprooted numerous trees.						
EF0	NE of Gallion	Hale	AL	32.5051°N 87.7038°W	06:26–06:35	8.72 mi (14.03 km)	220 yd (200 m)
EF0	A shed was destroyed. A trailer was knocked over at a church, significant portions of metal roofing were ripped from two more sheds and a barn, and numerous trees were snapped or uprooted. A home suffered minor damage to its shingles and overhangs as well.						
EF1	WSW of Leighton	Colbert	AL	34.6738°N 87.6075°W	06:35–06:36	1.1 mi (1.8 km)	70 yd (64 m)
EF1	A tornado moved through the Aycock Heights subdivision, damaging roofs and destroying several unanchored outbuildings and sheds. The tornado damaged a billboard, inflicted minor roof damage on a home nearby, and flipped an RV on its side. Many trees were also uprooted or snapped.						
EF1	NE of Low Gap to N of Hagler	Tuscaloosa	AL	33.0055°N 87.3586°W	07:20–07:25	3.51 mi (5.65 km)	475 yd (434 m)
EF1	This tornado touched down over inaccessible land just north of the Bibb County line. The roof was removed from a barn, shingles were peeled off a house, and another house also sustained roof damage. Many trees were either snapped or uprooted, with some blocking roads and one killing a cow.						
EF1	N of Escatawpa	Jackson	MS	30.4754°N 88.5595°W	07:50–07:52	1.1 mi (1.8 km)	50 yd (46 m)
EF1	A high-end EF1 tornado caused extensive roof damage and shifted the wall of a house. At one house, a roof was lifted into the air then placed back on top of the house, causing roof and siding damage as well as blown out windows. Some tree damage also occurred.						
EF0	ENE of Sprott	Perry	AL	32.6895°N 87.1621°W	08:21–08:31	6.67 mi (10.73 km)	400 yd (370 m)
EF0	A farm shed suffered minor structural damage. Several homes sustained damage to their roofs and siding, including one that saw two out of three of its support columns for the carport pulled out, resulting in partial roof failure. Trees were damaged.						
EF0	Highland Lakes	Shelby	AL	33.3539°N 86.6857°W	09:05–09:14	6.48 mi (10.43 km)	600 yd (550 m)
EF0	Some homes sustained roof and gutter damage, fences and an outdoor grill were blown over, and a church sustained minor damage. Trees were snapped or uprooted, one of which landed on a vehicle.						
EF0	W of Calera	Shelby	AL	33.1109°N 86.7851°W	09:14–09:19	2.97 mi (4.78 km)	125 yd (114 m)
EF0	One home had a portion of its wooden fence broken, with plywood, shingles, and tools lofted nearby. A second home suffered more severe damage, with the roof significantly damaged, including a small portion of the roof to an upstairs room that was ripped off. Numerous trees were snapped or uprooted, and additional fences were destroyed.						
EF1	NNE of Glencoe	Etowah	AL	33.9768°N 85.9276°W	11:28–11:33	3.76 mi (6.05 km)	95 yd (87 m)
EF1	One home had minor trim damage, while a few others sustained considerable roof, window, and exterior wall damage, including one poorly anchored home that was shifted off of its foundation. A car was moved from it original location, and trees were downed. Some outbuildings were destroyed, and a dock on the Coosa River was damaged.						
EF0	W of Henderson	Pike	AL	31.6594°N 86.1261°W	11:50–11:52	1 mi (1.6 km)	150 yd (140 m)
EF0	This tornado remained mainly over fields and farmland, though a few trees were uprooted.						
EF0	W of Goshen	Crenshaw, Pike	AL	31.7073°N 86.1688°W	11:53–11:59	2.58 mi (4.15 km)	70 yd (64 m)
EF0	The roof was ripped off a chicken barn, a gas station canopy was damaged, and trees were uprooted.						
EF1	Troy	Pike	AL	31.7949°N 85.9947°W	12:10–12:16	2.81 mi (4.52 km)	300 yd (270 m)
EF1	This tornado struck a mobile home park in town, moving about a dozen mobile homes off their foundations and rolling several others multiple times. Two cars were rolled at this location. Several businesses suffered damage, and large amounts of sheet metal was wrapped around power lines. Multiple homes had minor roof damage, and power poles and trees were snapped.						
EF0	Phenix City, AL to Columbus, GA	Russell (AL), Muscogee (GA)	AL	32.432°N 84.9714°W	14:14–14:23	3.24 mi (5.21 km)	50 yd (46 m)
EF0	A tornado inflicted substantial roof damage to the Phenix City Water Treatment facility and uprooted or snapped several trees. It crossed the Chattahoochee River into Georgia and struck Columbus, where a gas station had its metal roof damaged and several gas pumps knocked out. Metal panels were pulled from a one-story metal warehouse building as well.						
EF0	E of Midland	Muscogee, Harris, Talbot	GA	32.5795°N 84.7448°W	14:46–14:55	8.45 mi (13.60 km)	100 yd (91 m)
EF0	A home sustained minor shingle damage, two small trailers were rolled at a hunting camp, and dozens of trees were snapped or uprooted.						
EF0	SW of Milner	Lamar	GA	33.0686°N 84.2245°W	15:39–15:42	1.13 mi (1.82 km)	75 yd (69 m)
EF0	Several trees were snapped or uprooted, and a few power lines were downed.						
EF1	NNE of Milner	Lamar	GA	33.1380°N 84.1843°W	15:45–15:54	4.33 mi (6.97 km)	150 yd (140 m)
EF1	Numerous trees were snapped or uprooted. A house suffered minor shingle damage and its carport was damaged by a fallen tree. Utility poles were snapped as well.						
EF0	E of Orchard Hill	Spalding	GA	33.1788°N 84.1541°W	15:52–15:54	1.01 mi (1.63 km)	150 yd (140 m)
EF0	A few trees were snapped or uprooted.						
EF1	ENE of Autreyville	Colquitt	GA	31.07°N 83.7418°W	18:43–18:49	5.04 mi (8.11 km)	180 yd (160 m)
EF1	Three homes sustained major roof damage as a result of this high-end EF1 tornado. Debris was lofted into treetops, and numerous trees were snapped or uprooted.						
EF0	Northwestern Springfield	Clark	OH	39.9602°N 83.8561°W	19:12–19:15	2.68 mi (4.31 km)	80 yd (73 m)
EF0	This tornado struck the northwestern edge of Springfield, where several mobile homes suffered roof and awning damage at a mobile home park. One mobile home had its roof torn off and thrown 150 yd (140 m), with insulation scattered into nearby treetops. Two semi-trailers were blown over at an industrial facility, and soccer nets were blown over at a soccer field. Trees and fences were downed as well.						
EF2	SW of Shelby to N of Olivesburg	Richland	OH	40.8388°N 82.6943°W	20:42–21:00	17.0 mi (27.4 km)	880 yd (800 m)
EF2	A strong tornado impacted the southern fringes of Shelby, where a Chevrolet dealership sustained roof loss and collapse of multiple cinder block exterior walls. Vehicles were damaged in the parking lot, and metal light poles were bent to the ground. A nearby warehouse building had metal roofing peeled off as well. Homes along the path sustained partial to total roof loss, one of which sustained some collapse of exterior walls. Barns were destroyed, and trees and power poles were snapped. 6 people were injured.						
EF0	SE of Canal Fulton	Stark, Summit	OH	40.88°N 81.57°W	21:15-21:18	3.6 mi (5.8 km)	50 yd (46 m)
EF0	A small outbuilding was largely destroyed and treetops were damaged.						
EF0	W of Dover	Tuscarawas	OH	40.504°N 81.551°W	21:49-21:50	0.5 mi (0.80 km)	75 yd (69 m)
EF0	A 100-year-old barn was blown apart, with several items inside displaced. Several large branches were downed.						
EF0	Springboro	Crawford	PA	41.798°N 80.3734°W	22:48-22:49	0.4 mi (0.64 km)	100 yd (91 m)
EF0	Several homes in town were damaged by tornadic winds or fallen trees. Telephone poles and street signs were snapped or bent as well.						
EF0	SE of Cooperstown	Venango	PA	41.471°N 79.829°W	23:43–23:45	1.2 mi (1.9 km)	100 yd (91 m)
EF0	Several tree limbs were snapped.						
EF0	NE of Cherrytree	Venango	PA	41.545°N 79.687°W	23:53–23:55	1 mi (1.6 km)	75 yd (69 m)
EF0	Several tree limbs were snapped.						
EF2	Starbrick to N of Scandia	Warren	PA	41.7897°N 79.2857°W	00:20–00:40	18 mi (29 km)	400 yd (370 m)
EF2	A high-end EF2 tornado caused significant damage in Starbrick, where large metal buildings were completely destroyed at a lumber company. Several other buildings sustained extensive damage, and a boat was lifted off the ground. The tornado then struck North Warren, where multiple homes were damaged, and trees were downed. A communications tower was toppled to the ground in the Scandia area before the tornado dissipated.						
EF1	SW of Cedar Mountain	Greenville	SC	35.066°N 82.718°W	00:51-00:55	1.63 mi (2.62 km)	200 yd (180 m)
EF1	Hundreds of trees were snapped or uprooted. This is the first tornado in the Greenville County mountains since official recordkeeping began in 1950.						
EF1	SE of Bowersville	Hart	GA	34.327°N 83.04°W	00:53–00:58	2.88 mi (4.63 km)	100 yd (91 m)
EF1	Two large metal barns sustained significant roof or wall damage. One home had a small cinderblock wall collapsed while a second suffered damage to a single wall. A metal road sign was snapped at its base, free-standing carports were lofted, and the roof rack of an SUV was detached and thrown several hundred feet. Numerous trees were snapped or uprooted, one of which fell on a home.						
EF1	Simpsonville	Greenville	SC	34.71°N 82.293°W	02:03–02:13	6.9 mi (11.1 km)	100 yd (91 m)
EF1	Numerous homes suffered minor to moderate roof and shingle damage. Dozens of large trees were snapped or uprooted, including some that fell on homes. A trampoline was lifted hundreds of feet into the air, and a garage was collapsed on to three vehicles inside.						
EF1	Buffalo Valley	Union	PA	40.9579°N 76.9708°W	04:35-04:37	1.45 mi (2.33 km)	150 yd (140 m)
EF1	Several barns had their roofs taken off, and one barn was destroyed. Some homes sustained minor damage and many trees were uprooted or snapped.						

=== April 15 event ===
List of confirmed tornadoes – Monday, April 15, 2019
EF#	Location	County / Parish	State	Start Coord.	Time (UTC)	Path length	Max width
EF2	Benton	Columbia	PA	41.1887°N 76.4065°W	05:00–05:08	3.69 mi (5.94 km)	300 yd (270 m)
EF2	A strong tornado caused considerable damage in Benton, where approximately 50 homes and businesses were damaged, including one well-constructed home that had its roof torn off. Nine trailers sustained significant damage as well. Two people were injured.						
EF1	Dushore	Sullivan	PA	41.4716°N 76.5824°W	05:05–05:13	10.43 mi (16.79 km)	350 yd (320 m)
EF1	This tornado touched down near Worlds End State Park, where it snapped or uprooted numerous trees. A barn was destroyed at a farm as well. It then moved directly into Dushore, where 7 to 8 homes and a church steeple were moderately damaged.						
EF1	Port Crane	Broome	NY	42.2031°N 75.7473°W	05:32-05:35	2.15 mi (3.46 km)	175 yd (160 m)
EF1	Houses and outbuildings sustained minor damage.						
EF0	Scranton	Lackawanna	PA	41.3899°N 75.6593°W	05:45–05:49	3.22 mi (5.18 km)	100 yd (91 m)
EF0	Trees and wires were downed, some of which landed on buildings. Residences sustained roof damage, and a small structure was overturned.						
EF1	Harford Township	Susquehanna	PA	41.7474°N 75.6674°W	05:50–05:52	2.35 mi (3.78 km)	150 yd (140 m)
EF1	A silo was damaged, and a barn was destroyed. Trees and power lines were downed as well.						
EF0	N of Glenview	Halifax	NC	36.229°N 77.8557°W	06:16–06:18	0.98 mi (1.58 km)	50 yd (46 m)
EF0	A building had a part of its tin roof peeled back and a grain bin was damaged. One double-wide manufactured home suffered major damage to its roof and partial damage to a couple of its exterior walls, while a second sustained minor roof damage. Several trees were severely damaged as well.						
EF0	W of Heathsville	Northumberland	VA	37.9008°N 76.5189°W	06:29–06:31	1.3 mi (2.1 km)	50 yd (46 m)
EF0	This tornado caused roof damage to a few buildings along with minor tree damage.						
EF0	SE of Federalsburg	Dorchester	MD	38.65°N 75.76°W	07:31-07:32	0.5 mi (0.80 km)	100 yd (91 m)
EF0	A brief tornado damaged or destroyed small sheds, tipped over an empty trailer, and snapped or downed some trees.						
EF2	NW of Laurel to SE of Seaford	Sussex	DE	38.57°N 75.59°W	07:38–07:45	6.2 mi (10.0 km)	400 yd (370 m)
EF2	Numerous homes were damaged along the path, some of which had roofs or exterior walls ripped off. Barns, garages, and irrigation systems were destroyed, and many trees were snapped or uprooted. Power poles were snapped, and an Utz Quality Foods warehouse was badly damaged. One person was injured.						
EF1	Harbeson to Broadkill Beach	Sussex	DE	38.7400°N 75.2788°W	08:00–08:07	6.2 mi (10.0 km)	50 yd (46 m)
EF1	A few trees were snapped, the roof of a barn was removed, and some other structures suffered some roof damage as well.						

=== Hearne–Franklin–New Baden–Easterly–Ridge, Texas ===
Hearne–Franklin–New Baden–Easterly–Ridge, Texas
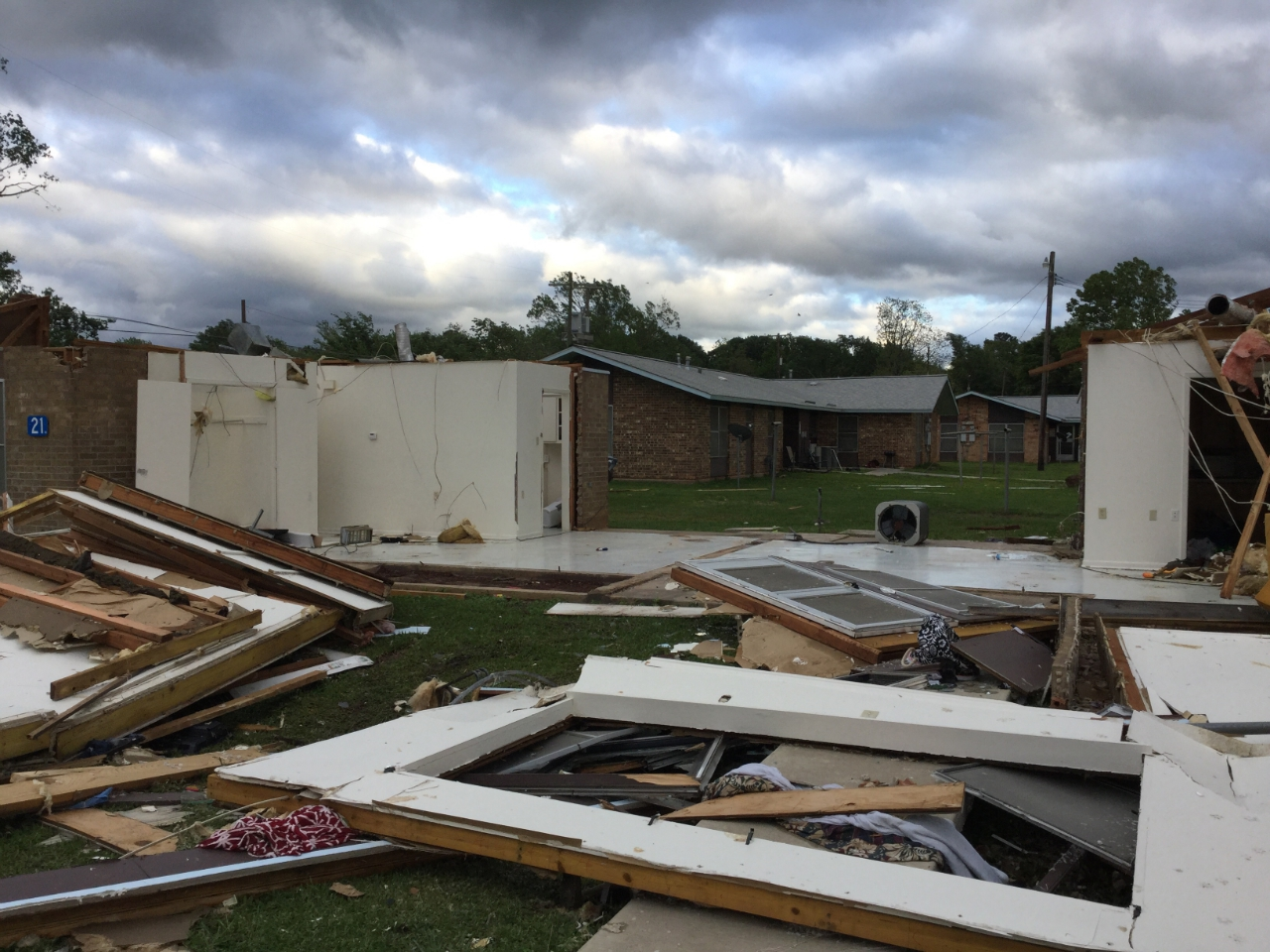
- Low-end EF3 damage to a home on E Grant St in Franklin, TX.

Meteorological history
- Formed: April 13, 2019, 10:50 a.m. CDT (UTC−05:00)
- Dissipated: April 13, 2019, 11:45 a.m. CDT
- Duration: 55 minutes

EF3 tornado
- on the Enhanced Fujita scale
- Highest winds: 140 mph (230 km/h)

Overall effects
- Fatalities: 0
- Injuries: 0

This relatively narrow but intense tornado first formed just west of the Brazos River in extreme eastern Milam County, northwest of Hearne at 10:50 am CDT on April 13. It first caused some EF0-EF1 tree damage as it moved northeastward before crossing the river as well as the county line three times before fully entering Robertson County. The tornado then grew in size as it approached SH 6 north of Hearne. Along Red Hill Road, the tornado bent a pole to the ground, damaged the roof of a home, and damaged or uprooted several trees. The tornado reached its peak width as it crossed SH 6, unroofing an outbuilding with parts of its displaced to the east, damaging the roof of another home, and damaging more trees. The tornado then narrowed significantly as it continued northeastward and then moved along US 79 towards Franklin, damaging an outbuilding along the highway.

As the tornado entered Franklin, the tornado rapidly intensified and reached low-end EF3 strength. Within a two-block-long corridor on the south side of Franklin, two residences lost most or all of their exterior walls along with some interior walls. Other homes lost exterior walls and roofs, outbuildings were unroofed, multiple mobile homes were rolled and destroyed, including one that was rolled into a house, multiple vehicles were damaged or thrown and destroyed, pieces of lumber were impaled into the side of several structures, and many power poles and trees were downed, with some trees being denuded. In all, one duplex, 55 homes, four businesses, and two churches were destroyed in Franklin. The path through the city was narrow and very concentrated, with several cases of homes neighboring destroyed homes sustaining little to no notable damage. The tornado then weakened again and narrowed even more as it continued up US 79, damaging trees with some uprooting noted along with damaging an outbuilding. The tornado passed through New Baden before veering away from US 79 and passing south of Easterly. The tornado then moved back over and moved along US 79 again, damaging and uprooting more trees as it continued northeastward and moved through Ridge. The tornado caused EF0 tree damage along the remainder of its path along US 79, crossing the Navasota River into Leon County before dissipating, south-southwest of Marquez at 11:45 a.m. CDT.

The tornado tracked 32.48 mi (52.27 km) in 55 minutes, and reached a peak width of 250 yd (230 m). Despite the damage, there were no casualties from this tornado.

=== Weches–Weeping Mary–Alto–Sacul, Texas ===
Weches–Weeping Mary–Alto–Sacul, Texas
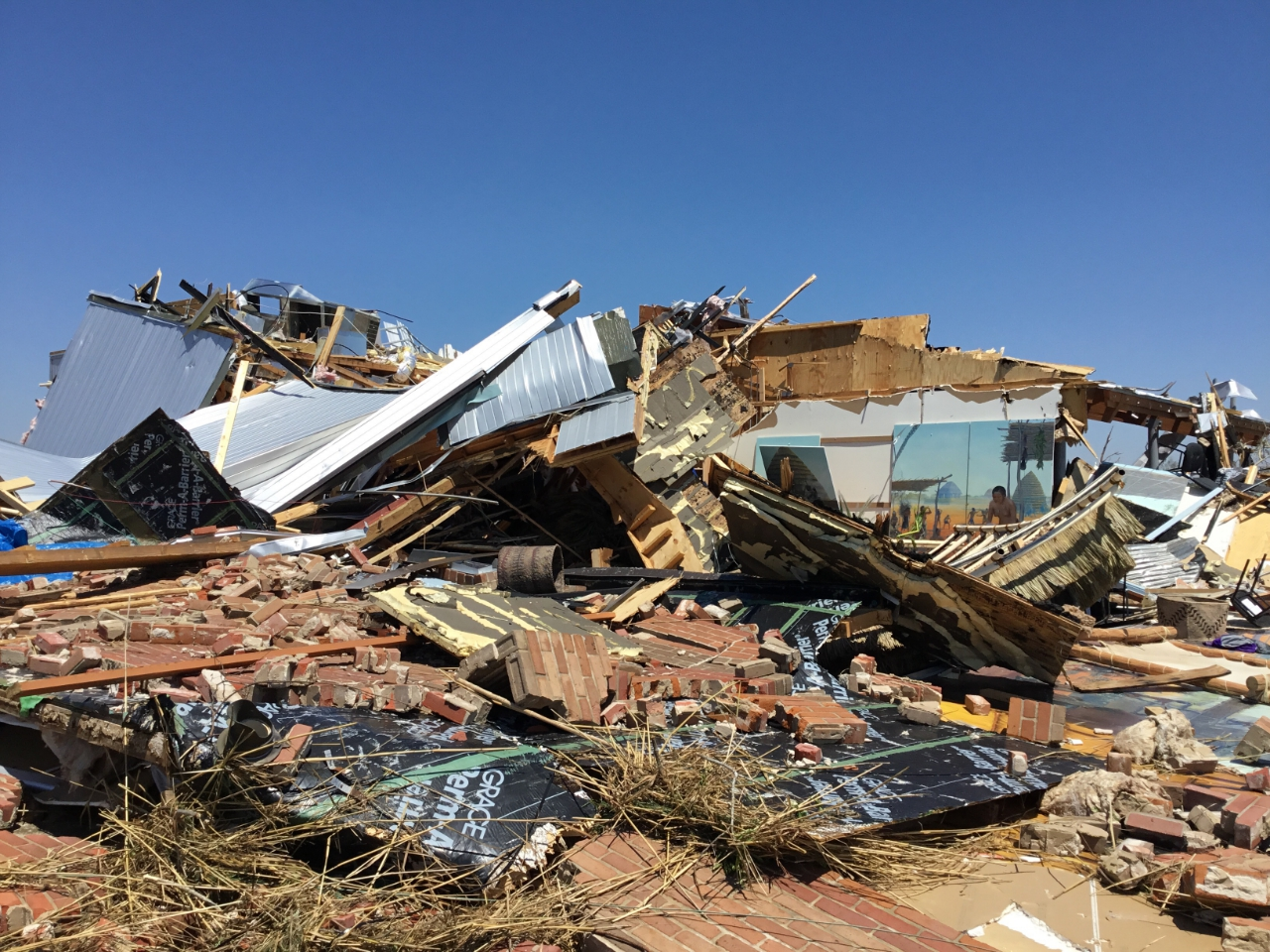
- EF3 damage to the Caddo Mounds State Historic Site museum in Weeping Mary, TX. One person was killed here, and several others were injured.

Meteorological history
- Formed: April 13, 2019, 1:00 p.m. CDT (UTC−06:00)
- Dissipated: April 13, 2019, 2:00 p.m. CDT
- Duration: 1 hour

EF3 tornado
- on the Enhanced Fujita scale
- Highest winds: 160 mph (260 km/h)

Overall effects
- Fatalities: 2
- Injuries: 20
- Damage: >$11.25 million (2019 USD)

This long-tracked, high-end EF3 tornado touched down east-northeast of Crockett, Texas in Houston County at 1:00 p.m. CDT (1:00 UTC), downing numerous trees at EF1 intensity as it tracked to the northeast through the Davy Crockett National Forest. The tornado intensified to low-end EF3 strength as it passed near Weches, where a large swath of trees was flattened, and an anchored double-wide manufactured home was thrown 150 yd (140 m) and obliterated, killing the occupant. Continuing into Cherokee County, the tornado maintained its strength as it closely followed SH 21 and struck the rural community of Weeping Mary, where approximately 20 homes and mobile homes were severely damaged or destroyed. The roof and exterior walls of the Caddo Mounds State Historic Site museum were destroyed while people were running inside for safety, resulting in several injuries and another fatality. Several well-built homes and a brick church sustained total roof and exterior wall loss in this area; trees were denuded and partially debarked, and vehicles were thrown up to 200 yd (180 m). Some outbuildings were damaged or destroyed as well. High-end EF3 damage occurred as the tornado then struck the town of Alto, where a two-story brick home was swept from its foundation, with the first floor completely destroyed and the second floor left partially intact and displaced downwind from the foundation. Metal power poles were bent in half, and several other homes and mobile homes in and around town were damaged or destroyed. Alto had already sustained damage from a separate EF2 tornado that struck the town earlier in the day.

The tornado exited Alto and continued to the northeast, where numerous trees were snapped, denuded, and partially debarked at low-end EF3 intensity. A home in this area had half of its second story torn off, and a second home was shifted off of its foundation and lost much of its roof. Damage to these two structures was rated EF2. Farther along the path, EF1 tree damage occurred as the tornado moved through sparsely populated wooded areas. The tornado then struck the small town of Sacul at EF1 strength, where trees and power poles were downed, headstones were shifted at a cemetery in town, and a flagpole was bent over. A frame home lost a large portion of its roof, and several trees were blown over onto the structure. Past Sacul, the tornado began moving nearly due north as it approached and crossed into Rusk County. A final area of significant damage occurred near the county line east-southeast of Reklaw, where a well-built home had a large portion of its roof torn off at EF2 intensity. The tornado continued through southwestern Rusk County before it weakened and dissipated at 2:00 p.m. CDT (19:00 UTC), after downing additional trees at EF0 to EF1 intensity. Along the entirety of its path, this tornado snapped, debarked, or uprooted thousands of trees.

Remaining on the ground for 60 minutes, the tornado traveled 41.13 miles (66.19 km) and achieved a maximum path width of 880 yards (800 m), resulting in two deaths and at least 20 injuries.

== See also ==
- List of North American tornadoes and tornado outbreaks
- List of United States tornadoes in April 2019
