= The Church of Jesus Christ of Latter-day Saints in Mississippi =

- Area: NA Southeast
- Members: 22,000 (2025)
- Stakes: 4
- Wards: 30
- Branches: 19
- Total Congregations: 49
- Missions: 1
- FamilySearch Centers: 20

The Church of Jesus Christ of Latter-day Saints in Mississippi refers to the Church of Jesus Christ of Latter-day Saints (LDS Church) and its members in Mississippi. The first small branch was established in 1842. It has since grown to 22,000 members in 49 congregations.

Official church membership as a percentage of general population was 0.72% in 2014. According to the 2014 Pew Forum on Religion & Public Life survey, 1% of Mississippins self-identify themselves most closely with The Church of Jesus Christ of Latter-day Saints. The LDS Church is the 10th largest denomination in Mississippi.

== History ==
Membership in Mississippi
Year	Membership
1839	6
1890	123
1906	1,018
1930	2,170
1970	6,527
1980	10,403
1990	13,000
1999	17,578
2008	20,811
2019	21,649
2025	22,000
*Membership was published as a rounded number. Source: Windall J. Ashton; Jim M. Wall, Deseret News, various years, Church Almanac Country Information: Mississippi

Missionaries John D. Hunter and Benjamin L. Clapp arrived in Tishomingo County in 1839. On December 26, 1839, Hunter reported they baptized six people. Seven more were baptized in 1840 by Norvel M. Head. Five more people were baptized on December 1, 1841, by elders Daniel Tyler and R. D. Sheldon.

Escaping persecution, a group of 80–90 members in 40 wagons arrived in Nauvoo from Mississippi in April 1842. A small branch was organized in Monroe County in 1842, where others were converted. Other branches were created in Mississippi as membership increased.

On April 8, 1846, a company of settlers left Monroe County expecting to join the main body of Latter-day Saints in Winter Quarters that was then planning to travel to the Rocky Mountains. This group was led by John Brown, who had been a leading missionary in Alabama and Mississippi. They instead became the first group of Mormons to cross the plains, wintering with fur trappers in Pueblo, Colorado that same year. These were the first to establish a religious colony in the west since the Spanish priests of 1769. Later, they founded a second colony at Cottonwood and Holladay in the Salt Lake Valley (once called the Mississippi Ward). They also helped found San Bernardino and were involved in other colonies along the Little Colorado in Arizona. Alice Rowan, one of the children of these first pioneers who taught at Riverside California, was among the first African American women to teach at a public school in the U.S.

Missionary work in Mississippi halted during the Civil War. This was resumed in 1877 with the arrival of W. H. Crawford and others. The Baldwin Branch was organized on July 27, 1877. In 1880, opposition tried, but failed to enlist the governor's help in forcing missionaries to leave the state. Missionary Alma P Richards was murdered in 1888, though a church investigation committee concluded that the motive was likely a robbery rather than persecution.

On July 24, 1935, the first "Pioneer Day" celebration in Mississippi honoring the Utah pioneers was held in Columbia. Members of the Columbia and Darbun Branches dressed in pioneer outfits and paraded down Main Street to the City Park for a pioneer picnic and activities. Townsfolk were invited and participated. An impromptu rodeo was held at the end of the day-long celebration when a missionary from Canada, Elder Weldon Bascom, showed his rodeo cowboy skills by riding a wild bucking mule for entertainment. This bucking exhibition sparked such interest in the town that a professional rodeo was organized a month later by Weldon Bascom and his brother Earl Bascom, assisted by other Mormon cowboys including Jake Lybbert, Waldo Ross, Ashel Evans, Horace and Lester Flake, and Don and Ferral Pearce. Some of these cowboys were still serving as missionaries. This historic rodeo in Columbia is now known as the world's first night rodeo held outdoors under electric lights.

The first two stakes in Mississippi (Jackson and Hattiesburg) were created in 1965. The Jackson Stake was created on May 2, 1965. It consisted of wards in Jackson, Meridian, Natchez, Columbus, Vicksburg, and Red Star, and a branch in Greenville.

The Hattiesburg Stake was created on June 27, 1965, with wards in Biloxi, Columbia, Gulfport, Hattiesburg, Liberty and Pascagoula. The Bayou La Croix, Darburn, Laurel, McNiel, Sand Hill and Seminary branches were also organized into that stake.

A monument at Mormon Springs (where many of the early saints were baptized) was dedicated in memory of the early pioneers from Mississippi, known as the Mississippi Saints. Also that year, a program was held commemorating the temporary colony in Pueblo, Colorado established by the Mississippi Saints.

On March 1, 2003, President Gordon B. Hinckley spoke to 6,000 members at the DeSoto Civic Center in Southaven, Mississippi. With no assignments for that weekend, President Hinckley said he wished to visit an area where he had never been.

Following Hurricane Katrina in 2005, several thousand Latter-day Saint volunteers, from a seven-state area (including Mississippi), went to the hurricane-devastated areas. Many of them took time out of their jobs or came down on the weekends to help anyone needing assistance (Mormon and non-Mormon).

In September 2008, Mississippi Latter-day Saints went to the Baton Rouge area to aid cleanup efforts following Hurricane Gustav.

== Stakes ==
Temples & Stakes in and near Mississippi that serve 2 or more congregations in Mississippi
Red = Temples
Green = Stake Centers

As of May 2026, Mississippi is currently part of 10 stakes. 4 of those stakes have their stake center within the state.

Mississippi Stakes

Stake	Organized	Mission	Temple District
Gulfport Mississippi	Oct. 10, 1982	Mississippi Jackson	Baton Rouge Louisiana
Hattiesburg Mississippi	June 27, 1965	Mississippi Jackson	Baton Rouge Louisiana
Jackson Mississippi	May 2, 1965	Mississippi Jackson	Baton Rouge Louisiana
Tupelo Mississippi	June 9, 1991	Arkansas Little Rock	Memphis Tennessee

Other Stakes with congregations in Mississippi

Stake	Organized	Mission	Temple District
Alexandria Louisiana	August 27, 1978	Louisiana Baton Rouge	Baton Rouge Louisiana
Denham Springs Louisiana	April 19, 1981	Louisiana Baton Rouge	Baton Rouge Louisiana
Memphis Tennessee	April 18, 1965	Arkansas Little Rock	Memphis Tennessee
Monroe Louisiana	August 18, 1985	Mississippi Jackson	Baton Rouge Louisiana
Slidell Louisiana	November 17, 1985	Louisiana Baton Rouge	Baton Rouge Louisiana
Tuscaloosa Alabama	September 12, 1982	Birmingham Alabama	Alabama Birmingham

== Missions ==
Mississippi forms parts of several church missions. Originally a conference of the Southern States Mission, it later became part of Central States Mission, Texas-Louisiana Mission, Gulf States Mission, Louisiana Baton Rouge Mission and ultimately the Mississippi Jackson Mission formed in 1979 with Frank W. Hirschi as president, but was discontinued in 2018. In 2026, the mission was reinstated and covers most of Mississippi, Northern Louisiana, portions of Southern Arkansas and a portion of Northeast Texas.

Parts of the state are located in the Alabama Birmingham, Arkansas Little Rock, and Louisiana Baton Rouge Missions (see Stakes).

== Temples ==
While there are no temples in Mississippi, 2 temples that lie in close proximity serve the large majority of the members in the state. While most congregations are in the Memphis and Baton Rouge temple districts, one congregation, the Columbus Ward, on the eastern side of the state is in the Birmingham Alabama Temple District.

== See also ==
- The Church of Jesus Christ of Latter-day Saints membership statistics (United States)
- Mississippi: Religion
