= Darracott =

Darracott may refer to:

== People ==
- Joseph Darracott (1934–1998), British writer
- Risdon Darracott (1717–1759), English independent minister
- Terry Darracott (born 1950), English footballer
- Henry Young Darracott Scott (1822–1883), English military officer
- E. Darracott Vaughan (1939–2016), American urologist and professor

== Locations ==
- Darracott, Mississippi, United States
- Stone-Darracott House, in Dublin, New Hampshire, United States
