= Anthony J. Cox =

American politician

Member of the Mississippi State Senate from the 38th district
- In office January 17, 1916 – January 1920 Serving with Thomas K. Boggan

Personal details
- Born: October 21, 1890 Smithville, Mississippi, U.S.
- Died: January 12, 1972 (aged 81) Concord, Tennessee, U.S.
- Party: Democratic

Anthony Jerome Cox (October 21, 1890 - January 13, 1972) was an American politician. He was a member of the Mississippi State Senate, representing the 38th District, from 1916 to 1920.

== Biography ==
Anthony Jerome Cox was born on October 21, 1890, near Smithville, Mississippi. He was the son of James P. Cox and Polly Annie (Irvin) Cox. Cox attended the public schools of Monroe County, Mississippi, and attended high schools in Hatley, Mississippi, and Smithville. He then taught for several years before engaging in farming and raising livestock. In 1915, Cox was elected to represent the 38th District as a Democrat in the Mississippi State Senate for the 1916-1920 term. In 1961, Cox moved to Tennessee. He died at his home in Concord, Tennessee, on January 13, 1972.

== Personal life ==
Cox was a member of the Woodmen of the World. He was married to Jeffie Mae, and they had at least three children, including a son and two daughters.
