= Bristow, Mississippi =

- Unincorporated community
- Location within Mississippi Location within the United States
- Coordinates: 34°00′19″N 88°21′50″W
- Country: United States
- State: Mississippi
- County: Monroe
- Elevation: 151 ft (46 m)
- Time zone: UTC-6 (Central (CST))
  - Summer (DST): UTC-5 (CDT)
- Area code: 662
- GNIS feature ID: 687368

Bristow is an unincorporated community in Monroe County, Mississippi. Bristow is located northeast of Hatley and southeast of Smithville.

== History ==
A post office operated under the name Bristow from 1893 to 1903.
