= Parham, Mississippi =

- Unincorporated community
- Location within Mississippi Location within the United States
- Coordinates: 34°00′35″N 88°20′26″W
- Country: United States
- State: Mississippi
- County: Monroe
- Elevation: 492 ft (150 m)
- Time zone: UTC-6 (Central (CST))
  - Summer (DST): UTC-5 (CDT)
- Area code: 662
- GNIS feature ID: 675443

Parham is an unincorporated community in Monroe County, Mississippi. Parham is located northeast of Hatley and southeast of Smithville.

The Parham Field is a natural gas field located in Parham.
