= Bolivar, Monroe County, Mississippi =

Bolivar, Mississippi
- Ghost town
- Location within Mississippi Location within the United States
- Coordinates: 33°53′50″N 88°26′36″W
- Country: United States
- State: Mississippi
- County: Monroe
- Elevation: 285 ft (87 m)
- Time zone: UTC-6 (Central (CST))
  - Summer (DST): UTC-5 (CDT)
- GNIS feature ID: 709317

Bolivar is a ghost town located in Monroe County, Mississippi, United States.

Bolivar appeared on a map of Mississippi from 1831, and was located on a road midway between Hamilton and Cotton Gin Port.

The New Hope Primitive Baptist Church was located there, and there may have also been one store.
