= Becker, Mississippi =

- Unincorporated community
- Location within Mississippi Location within the United States
- Coordinates: 33°55′59″N 88°28′52″W
- Country: United States
- State: Mississippi
- County: Monroe
- Elevation: 233 ft (71 m)
- Time zone: UTC-6 (Central (CST))
  - Summer (DST): UTC-5 (CDT)
- ZIP code: 38825
- Area code: 662
- GNIS feature ID: 666738

Becker (also known as Howells Crossing) is an unincorporated community in Monroe County, Mississippi.

== History ==
Becker is located along the BNSF Railway and Mississippi Highway 25.

Becker is served by the Becker Community Center.

The Monroe County Advanced Learning Center, part of the Monroe County School District, is located in Becker.

A post office first began operations under the name Becker in 1928.

The Becker Corner Notch, a provisional projectile point type found at the Hester Site, is named for Becker.
