= Sipsey Fork, Mississippi =

- Unincorporated community
- Location within Mississippi Location within the United States
- Coordinates: 33°56′57″N 88°14′37″W
- Country: United States
- State: Mississippi
- County: Monroe
- Elevation: 302 ft (92 m)
- Time zone: UTC-6 (Central (CST))
  - Summer (DST): UTC-5 (CDT)
- Area code: 662
- GNIS feature ID: 677852

Sipsey Fork is an unincorporated community located in Monroe County, Mississippi, United States.

It is situated east of Splunge.

== History ==
The community derives its name from the nearby Sipsey Creek.

In 1896, a post office operated under the name Sipsey.

Sipsey Fork is home to Center Point Church, founded in 1845, which also served as the community's school.
