= Splunge, Mississippi =

- Unincorporated community
- Location within Mississippi Location within the United States
- Coordinates: 33°58′08″N 88°16′07″W
- Country: United States
- State: Mississippi
- County: Monroe
- Elevation: 341 ft (104 m)
- Time zone: UTC-6 (Central (CST))
  - Summer (DST): UTC-5 (CDT)
- GNIS feature ID: 678059

Splunge, (also known as Lannsdale or Lanndale), is an unincorporated community in Monroe County, Mississippi.

Splunge is located on Splunge Creek, east of Hatley and north of Greenwood Springs.

== History ==
In 1900, Splunge had a population of 18.

A post office operated under the name Splung from 1848 to 1867 and the name Splunge from 1881 to 1918.

The Splunge Free Will Baptist Church was built in 1844 and is the oldest surviving church building in Monroe County and the oldest Free Will Baptist church in Mississippi.

The Splunge Lookout Tower is listed on the National Historic Lookout Register.

The community is served by two volunteer fire departments.

In 1973, natural gas reserves were discovered in Splunge.
