= Lynching of Keith Bowen =

- Part of the Jim Crow era
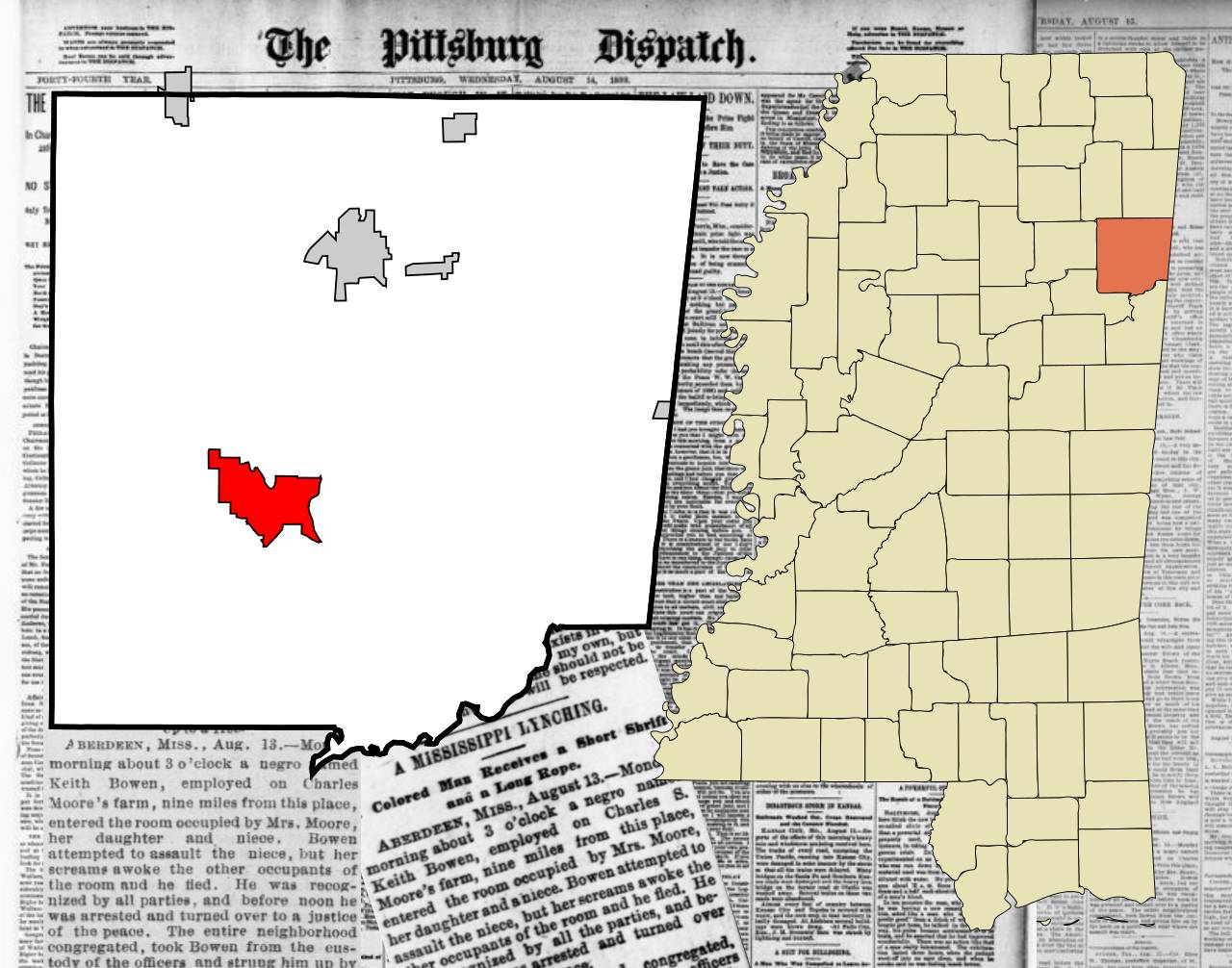
- News coverage of Lynching of Keith Bowen
- Date: August 14, 1889
- Location: Aberdeen, Monroe County, Mississippi
- Deaths: Keith Bowen

Keith Bowen was an African-American man who was lynched near Aberdeen, Monroe County, Mississippi by a white mob on August 14, 1889.

== Discovery ==
Bowen was found in the bedroom of a young white woman in the Lebanon community, about six miles south of Aberdeen and about nine miles from his place of employment, the farm of Charles Keith, while other reports say Charles Moore. After being discovered about 3:00 AM, Bowen fled but was hunted down by a posse in a field two to three miles away from the young woman's house, turning him over to a justice of the peace.

== Lynching ==
He was then taken quietly from his captors and hanged. The entire neighborhood was alleged to have taken Bowen from the custody of others and hanged him on the public road near where the alleged assault occurred.

== Other county lynchings ==
In 1914, Mayho Miller, an 18-year-old African-American man, was lynched by a mob after an alleged assault.

In 1922, an 18-year-old African-American man, William Baker was lynched in Aberdeen, Monroe County, Mississippi by a white mob on March 8. According to the United States Senate Committee on the Judiciary it was the 14th of 61 lynchings during 1922 in the United States.

== See also ==
- List of lynching victims in the United States

== Bibliography ==
Notes

References

- "Mississippi shows low lynching record during 1914". East Mississippi Times. January 15, 1915. OCLC 16396509.
- "Swift Justice". Fort Worth Daily Gazette. August 15, 1889. pp. 1–8. ISSN 1946-6080. OCLC 13695711.
- "Negro Item". Kansas City Gazette. Kansas City, Wyandotte, Kansas. August 15, 1889. OCLC 12990378.
- "Lynched. Strung up for attempting an assault upon a young woman". Indiana Progress. Indiana, Pa.: R.M. Birkman. 1889. OCLC 10215219.
- "Lynching". Montgomery Advertiser. April 22, 2018. ISSN 2993-9151. OCLC 1393208361.
- "Negro Hanged by Citizens". Okolona Messenger. Okolona, Chickasaw, Mississippi: Abe Steinberger & Sons. March 9, 1922. pp. 1–8. ISSN 2469-7559. OCLC 16103582.
- "A Mississippi Lynching". Pittsburg Dispatch. Pittsburgh, Allegheny, Pennsylvania: Rook, O'Neil & Co. August 14, 1889. pp. 1–8. ISSN 2157-1295. OCLC 2266159.
- United States Senate Committee on the Judiciary (1926). "To Prevent and Punish the Crime of Lynching: Hearings Before the United States Senate Committee on the Judiciary, Subcommittee on S. 121, Sixty-Ninth Congress, First Session, on Feb. 16, 1926". United States Government Publishing Office.
- "The Winston Signal". The Winston Signal. Louisville, Miss.: E.M. Hight & W.J. Newsom. 1889. OCLC 17689629.
- "Women seize Negro later found hanging to tree". The Washington Times. Washington, District of Columbia: William Randolph Hearst. March 8, 1922. pp. 1–22. ISSN 1941-0697. OCLC 10630160.
