= Lackey, Mississippi =

- Unincorporated community
- Location within Mississippi Location within the United States
- Coordinates: 33°48′11″N 88°27′44″W
- Country: United States
- State: Mississippi
- County: Monroe
- Elevation: 220 ft (67 m)
- Time zone: UTC-6 (Central (CST))
  - Summer (DST): UTC-5 (CDT)
- Area code: 662
- GNIS feature ID: 672238

Lackey, (also known as Noah) is an unincorporated community in Monroe County, Mississippi. Lackey is located between Aberdeen and Hamilton on U.S. Route 45.

== History ==
Lackey is served by the Lackey Community Center.

A post office operated under the name Lackey from 1891 to 1903.
