= Central Grove =

Central Grove may refer to:

- Central Grove, Mississippi
- Central Grove, Nova Scotia
