= New Hamilton, Mississippi =

- Census-designated place
- Location within Mississippi Location within the United States
- Coordinates: 33°44′16″N 88°26′41″W
- Country: United States
- State: Mississippi
- County: Monroe

Area
  - Total: 3.56 sq mi (9.2 km^{2})
  - Land: 3.56 sq mi (9.2 km^{2})
  - Water: 0.01 sq mi (0.026 km^{2})
- Elevation: 223 ft (68 m)

Population (2020)
  - Total: 533
  - Density: 149.93/sq mi (57.89/km^{2})
- Time zone: UTC-6 (Central (CST))
  - Summer (DST): UTC-5 (CDT)
- ZIP Code: 39746 (Hamilton)
- GNIS feature ID: 674635
- FIPS Code: 28-51240

New Hamilton is a census-designated place and unincorporated community in Monroe County, Mississippi, United States, next to the older community of Hamilton. As of the 2020 census, it had a population of 533. The Hamilton post office, serving both communities, is located in New Hamilton.

== History ==
Hamilton was the first county seat of Monroe County. In 1830, Monroe County was split to form Lowndes County to the south, and the county seat of Monroe County was moved north to Aberdeen.

New Hamilton was established in the late 1880s 2 miles (3 km) west of the original Hamilton with the arrival of the Kansas City, Memphis and Birmingham Railroad and is now a larger community than "Old Hamilton".

== Geography ==
New Hamilton is in southern Monroe County and is bordered to the east by the Hamilton CDP. U.S. Route 45 passes through the east side of New Hamilton as a four-lane bypass. Aberdeen, the county seat, is 10 miles (16 km) to the northwest via US 45, and Columbus is 17 miles (27 km) to the south.

According to the U.S. Census Bureau, the New Hamilton CDP has an area of 3.6 square miles (9.3 km^{2}), of which 0.01 square miles (0.03 km^{2}), or 0.17%, are water. The community is drained by west-flowing tributaries of the Tombigbee River.

== Demographics ==
Historical population
Census	Pop.	Note	%±
2020	533		—
U.S. Decennial Census

New Hamilton first appeared as a census designated place in the 2010 U.S. census.

== Economy ==
Tronox operates a titanium dioxide manufacturing facility in Hamilton, producing 225,000 tonnes annually.

== Education ==
It is in the Monroe County School District.
