= Westville, Monroe County, Mississippi =

Westville, Mississippi
- Unincorporated community
- Location within Mississippi Location within the United States
- Coordinates: 33°51′14″N 88°23′09″W
- Country: United States
- State: Mississippi
- County: Monroe
- Elevation: 381 ft (116 m)
- Time zone: UTC-6 (Central (CST))
  - Summer (DST): UTC-5 (CDT)
- Area code: 662
- GNIS feature ID: 711140

Westville is an unincorporated community in Monroe County, Mississippi, United States.

Westville is located northeast of Aberdeen on Mississippi Highway 8.
