= Mormon Springs, Mississippi =

- Unincorporated community
- Location within Mississippi Location within the United States
- Coordinates: 33°49′35″N 88°17′44″W
- Country: United States
- State: Mississippi
- County: Monroe
- Elevation: 266 ft (81 m)
- Time zone: UTC-6 (Central (CST))
  - Summer (DST): UTC-5 (CDT)
- Area code: 662
- GNIS feature ID: 709363

Mormon Springs is an unincorporated community in Monroe County, Mississippi. Mormon Springs is located southwest of Gattman.

== History ==
Mormon Springs is named for the nearby spring used to baptize local converts to The Church of Jesus Christ of Latter-day Saints (LDS). On April 8, 1846, 43 people, led by John Brown, left Mormon Springs with the planned destination of the Salt Lake Valley. Among the settlers was John Holladay and Hark Wales, one of the earliest African-American members of the LDS church. The settlers became known as the "Mississippi Saints", and established one of the first settlements outside of Salt Lake City. This community became what is today Holladay, Utah. The Mississippi Saints also became the first American settlers of San Bernardino, California.

A post office operated under the name Mormon Springs from 1854 to 1860.

A granite monument describes the history of Mormon Springs and the Mississippi Saints.
