= Stone Farm (Dublin, New Hampshire) =

Historic house in New Hampshire, United States

- U.S. National Register of Historic Places
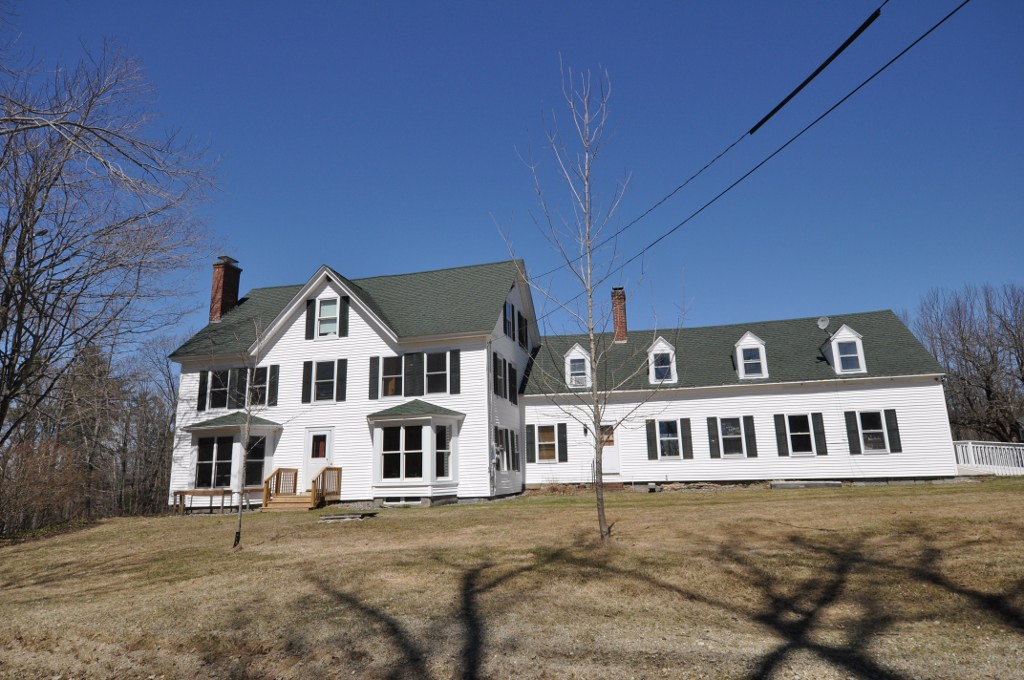

- Location within New Hampshire Location within the United States
- Location: Old Marlborough Rd., Dublin, New Hampshire
- Coordinates: 42°53′41″N 72°8′54″W
- Area: 1.9 acres (0.77 ha)
- Built: 1806
- Architect: John Stone, Sr. and Jr.
- Architectural style: Greek Revival
- MPS: Dublin MRA
- NRHP reference No.: 83004076
- Added to NRHP: December 18, 1983

The Stone Farm is a historic farmhouse on Old Marlborough Road in Dublin, New Hampshire. Built about 1806 with several 19th-century alterations, it is a well-preserved example of a period farmhouse. The property was listed on the National Register of Historic Places in 1983.

== Description and history ==
The Stone Farm is located in a rural setting in western Dublin on the north side of Old Marlborough Road west of East Stone Road, with a fine view north toward Stone Pond. It is a 2 1/2-story wood-frame structure, with a gabled roof and clapboarded exterior. Its main facade is five bays wide, with bay windows on either side of the main entrance on the ground floor, and five sash windows arranged symmetrically on the second floor. A gabled wall dormer is centered on the front roof face. To the right of the main block is an elongated single-story ell, with four gabled dormers. East of the house stands a large T-shaped 19th-century barn with cupola.

The main block was built c. 1806 by John Stone, Jr. It was enlarged, possibly in several stages, during the 19th century, giving it its present Greek Revival styling, with some Italianate touches. The property was bought in 1905 by Alberta Houghton (of the Houghton Mifflin publishing family), and operated as a "gentleman's farm" into the 1940s. Houghton also purchased the nearby Stone-Darracott House property as part of her farm.

== See also ==
- National Register of Historic Places listings in Cheshire County, New Hampshire
