= Binford, Mississippi =

- Unincorporated community
- Location within Mississippi Location within the United States
- Coordinates: 33°45′11″N 88°34′51″W
- Country: United States
- State: Mississippi
- County: Monroe
- Elevation: 262 ft (80 m)
- Time zone: UTC-6 (Central (CST))
  - Summer (DST): UTC-5 (CDT)
- Area code: 662
- GNIS feature ID: 667175

Binford is an unincorporated community in Monroe County, Mississippi. Binford is located southwest of Aberdeen.

== History ==
Binford is located along the CPKC Railway, ex Kansas City Southern Railway and in 1910 had a general store.

A cotton gin once operated in Binford.

A post office operated under the name Binford from 1890 to 1905.
