= Thomas K. Boggan =

American politician

Member of the Mississippi State Senate from the 38th district
- In office January 1916 – January 1920 Serving with Anthony J. Cox

Personal details
- Born: February 2, 1880 Mooresville, Mississippi
- Died: March 28, 1958 (aged 78) Jackson, Mississippi
- Party: Democratic

Thomas Kendall Boggan (February 2, 1880 - March 28, 1958) was an American teacher, lawyer, and Democratic politician. He was a member of the Mississippi State Senate, from the 38th District, from 1916 to 1920.

== Early life and education ==
Thomas Kendall Boggan was born on February 2, 1880, in Mooresville, Mississippi. He was the son of Thomas Armstrong Boggan, a former member of the Mississippi House of Representatives, and Mittie Catherine (Mitchener) Boggan, a descendant of Daniel Boone. Boggan was of Irish and English descent. He attended the public schools of Mooresville and Fulton, Mississippi. He attended Tupelo High School from 1898 to 1899, and the University of Mississippi from 1899 to 1903, graduating with a B. P. degree in 1903. He then attended the University of Michigan Law School for three semesters and then did a senior course in the University of Mississippi School of Law, graduating with a Bachelor of Laws degree in 1912.

== Professional career ==
While studying law, Boggan was also working in the field of education. He was the Superintendent of public schools in Collins, Mississippi, from 1903 to 1907, of Magnolia, Mississippi, from 1907 to 1908, and of Biloxi, Mississippi, from 1908 to 1911. He was a member of the Mississippi State Textbook Commission from the 6th Congressional District from 1905 to 1910. He began practicing law in November 1912 in Meridian, Mississippi. Soon afterwards, he moved to Tupelo, Mississippi, and continued practicing law there. In 1915, Boggan was elected to represent the 38th District in the Mississippi State Senate for the 1916-1920 term. Boggan stopped practicing law in the 1920s, and continued teaching until 1947.

== Personal life ==
Boggan was a member of the Methodist Church, and of the Freemasons, Woodmen of the World, and the Knights of Pythias. He married Shirley Sue Neill in 1904. Boggan died at his home in Jackson, Mississippi, on March 28, 1958, from a self-inflicted bullet wound, after being "in ill health and despondent for a month."
