= Riggins, Mississippi =

Unincorporated community in Mississippi, US

- Unincorporated community
- Location within Mississippi Location within the United States
- Coordinates: 34°03′02″N 88°15′10″W
- Country: United States
- State: Mississippi
- County: Monroe
- Elevation: 495 ft (151 m)
- Time zone: UTC-6 (Central (CST))
  - Summer (DST): UTC-5 (CDT)
- Area code: 662
- GNIS feature ID: 711139

Riggins is an unincorporated community in Monroe County, Mississippi, United States.

== History ==
Riggins is located on Splunge Creek, a tributary of the Buttahatchee River. In 1900, Riggins had a population of 22.

A post office operated under the name Riggins from 1886 to 1906.
