= Strong, Mississippi =

- Unincorporated community
- Location within Mississippi Location within the United States
- Coordinates: 33°41′43″N 88°36′16″W
- Country: United States
- State: Mississippi
- County: Monroe
- Elevation: 253 ft (77 m)
- Time zone: UTC-6 (Central (CST))
  - Summer (DST): UTC-5 (CDT)
- Area code: 662
- GNIS feature ID: 678365

Strong (also known as Strongs or Strongs Station) is an unincorporated community in Monroe County, Mississippi, United States.

Strong is located southwest of Aberdeen.

== History ==
Strong is located along the CPKC Railway, ex Kansas City Southern Railway.

In 1900, Strong had a population of 63.

A post office operated under the name Strongs from 1884 to 1914 and under the name Strong from 1944 to 1963.

The Strong Field is a natural gas field located in Strong.
