= Darracott, Mississippi =

- Unincorporated community
- Location within Mississippi Location within the United States
- Coordinates: 33°43′25″N 88°31′55″W
- Country: United States
- State: Mississippi
- County: Monroe
- Elevation: 292 ft (89 m)
- Time zone: UTC-6 (Central (CST))
  - Summer (DST): UTC-5 (CDT)
- Area code: 662
- GNIS feature ID: 709330

Darracott (also known as Darracott Crossroads, Fousts Shop, or Southern Crossroads) is an unincorporated community in Monroe County, Mississippi. Darracott is located south of Aberdeen.

== History ==
Darracott is served by the Darracott Community Center.

A post office operated under the name Darracott from 1895 to 1904.
