= Stone-Darracott House =

Historic house in New Hampshire, United States

- U.S. National Register of Historic Places
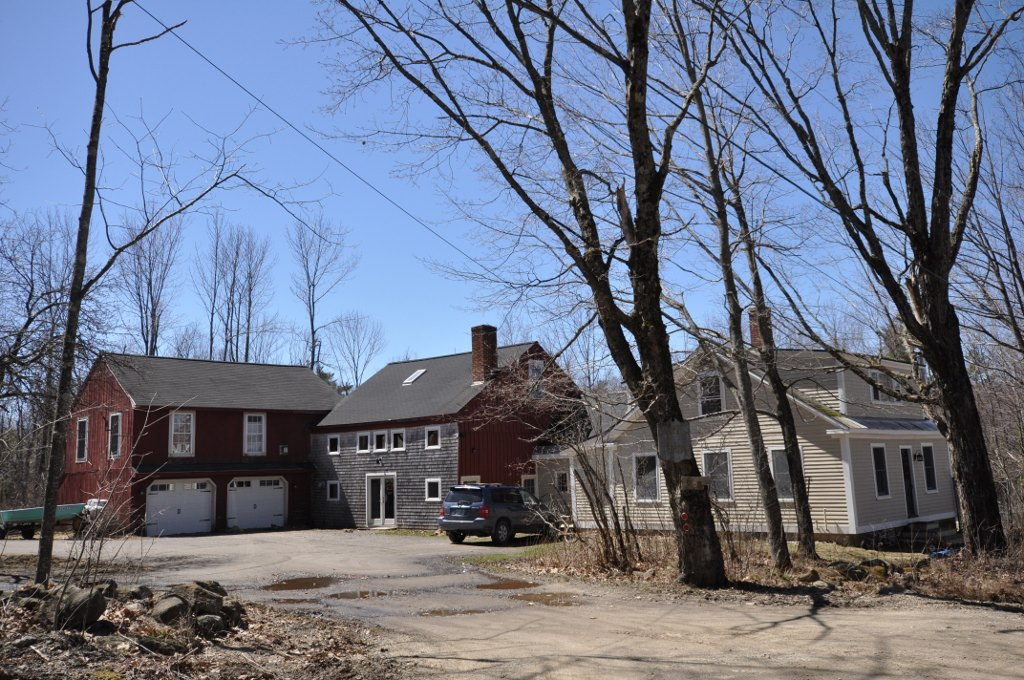

- Location within New Hampshire Location within the United States
- Location: Old Marlborough Rd., Dublin, New Hampshire
- Coordinates: 42°53′34″N 72°8′54″W
- Area: 0.6 acres (0.24 ha)
- Built: 1792
- Built by: Stone, John
- Architectural style: Colonial
- MPS: Dublin MRA
- NRHP reference No.: 83004077
- Added to NRHP: December 15, 1983

The Stone-Darracott House is a historic house on Old Marlborough Road in Dublin, New Hampshire. It was built in 1792 by John Stone, an early settler of Dublin for whom nearby Stone Pond is named. The house was also made part of a "gentleman's farm" by Mrs. Alberta Houghton (of the Houghton Mifflin publishing family) in the early 20th century, along with the adjacent Stone Farm. The house was listed on the National Register of Historic Places in 1983.

== Description and history ==
The Stone-Darracott House is located in a rural setting in western Dublin, on the south side of Old Marlborough Road a short way west of East Shore Road. It is a 1 1/2-story Cape style house, with a gabled roof, central chimney, and clapboarded exterior. Its main facade is three bays wide, with a simply framed center entrance and sash windows. Shed-roof dormers extend across most of the front and back roof faces. A single-story ell connects the house to a modern two-story barn-like addition, itself attached to a 19th-century barn.

The main house was built in 1792 by John Stone, and was next occupied by his son Samuel. It was then purchased by William Darracott, whose daughter Sarah Darracott Allison was the next resident. In 1910 the Allisons sold the property to Alberta Houghton, who formed a summer property and gentleman's farm anchored by this property and the old Stone Farm across the street. Another 20th-century owner of the property was Holman Hamilton, a history professor and biographer of Zachary Taylor.

== See also ==
- National Register of Historic Places listings in Cheshire County, New Hampshire
