= John Brown (Mormon pioneer) =

American politician

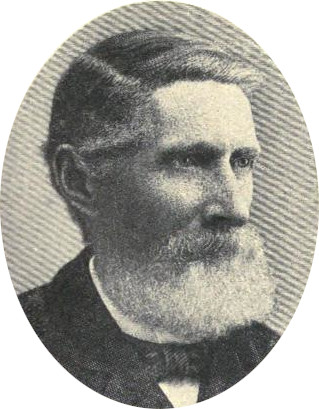
- Born: October 23, 1820; Sumner County, Tennessee
- Died: November 4, 1896 (aged 76); Pleasant Grove, Utah

John Brown (October 23, 1820 – November 4, 1896) was a leader among the Mormons in the southern United States and in the pioneer exodus to the West. He was also a member of the Utah Territorial Legislature.

Brown was born in Sumner County, Tennessee. He was baptized as a member of the Church of Jesus Christ of Latter Day Saints in Perry County, Illinois, by George P. Dykes. Brown later served as a Mormon missionary in Tennessee, Alabama, Mississippi, and Liverpool, England. He headed a group of Latter-day Saints, mainly from Mormon Springs, Mississippi, who moved west in 1846. They did not realize that the main body of the church had stopped at Winter Quarters, Nebraska, and they ended up wintering in Pueblo, Colorado. Brown himself had headed back east to meet with higher up church leaders, and was part of the pioneer company headed by Brigham Young that arrived in the Salt Lake Valley in July 1847. Brown was in charge of looking over the four slaves that were given to help with the westward emigration. He himself owned one slave through marriage to Elizabeth Crosby, and he gave that slave to the church as tithing. Brown made 13 trips across the country leading Latter-day Saints to Utah and other parts in the West.

From 1860 to 1862, Brown served as a missionary in Great Britain. From 1863 until 1891, he was the bishop of the Pleasant Grove Ward in Pleasant Grove, Utah. He also served for a time as mayor of Pleasant Grove. From 1867 to 1868, he served another mission in the Southern States Mission. He was later made a patriarch in the church. Brown suffered from lung problems in his later years and died at his home on November 4, 1896.
