= Lynching of William Baker =

- Part of Jim Crow Era
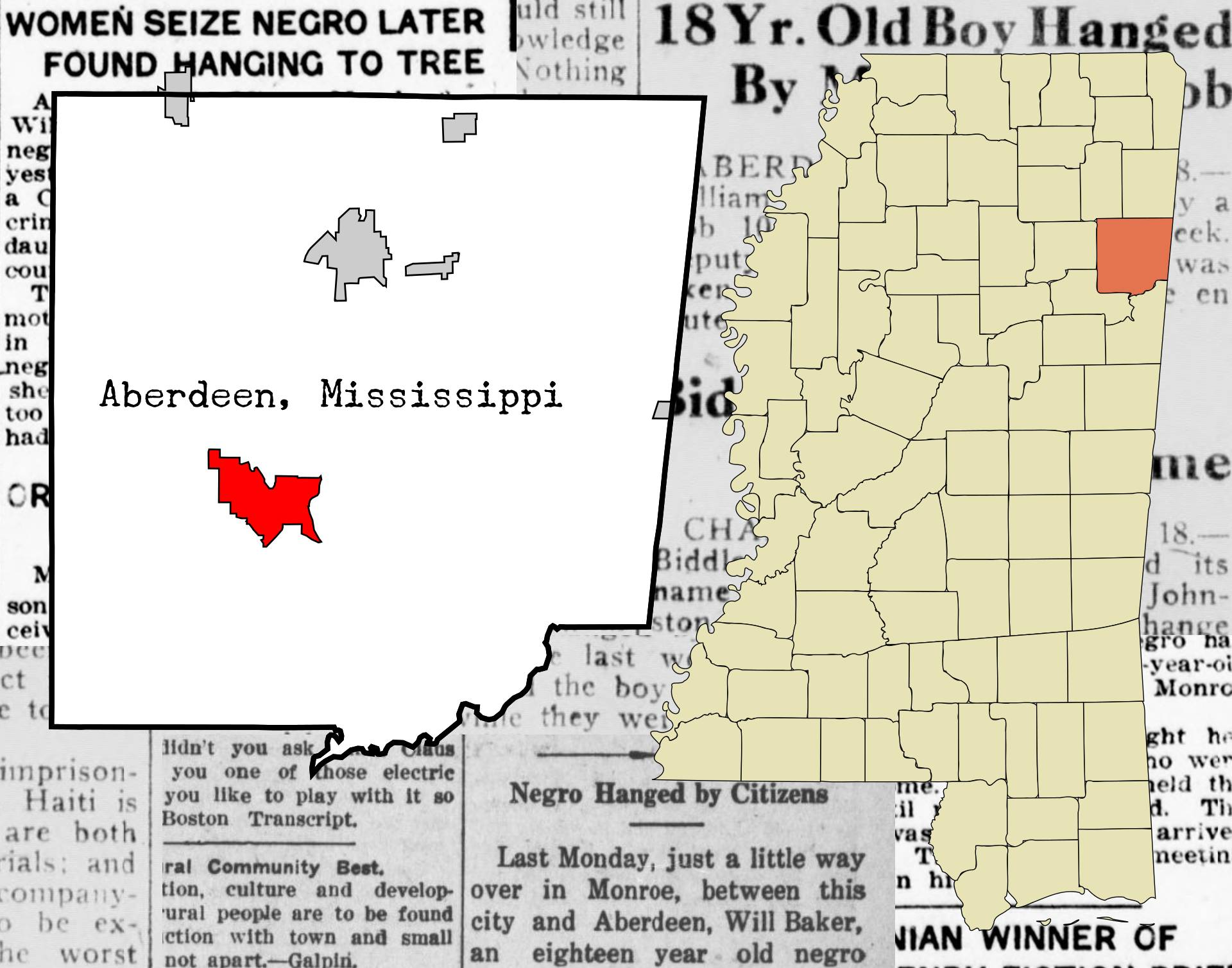
- News coverage of the Lynching of William Baker
- Date: March 8, 1922
- Location: Monroe County, Mississippi
- Deaths: William Baker

William Baker was an 18-year-old African-American man who was lynched in Monroe County, Mississippi by a white mob on March 8, 1922. According to the United States Senate Committee on the Judiciary it was the 14th of 61 lynchings during 1922 in the United States.

== Lynching ==
Between Okolona and Aberdeen, Mississippi, 18-year-old farmhand William Baker was putting a buggy into its shed when the six-year-old daughter of Constable Sidney Johnson got into it. Baker allegedly then took the girl to a shed where she started screaming. Her mother came running and grabbed hold of him. A white mob quickly gathered and hanged Baker. His body was discovered by Sheriff Lewis hanging from a Chinaberry tree. The Chicago Whip writes the lynching took place 10 miles (16 km) from Aberdeen, Mississippi.

== See also ==
In 1899, Keith Bowen, a black man was lynched by a mob after an alleged assault. In 1914, Mayho Miller, an 18-year-old black man, was lynched by a mob after an alleged assault.

== Bibliography ==
Notes

References

- "18 Yr. old boy hanged by Mississippi Mob". The Chicago Whip. Chicago, Cook County, Illinois: Whip Pub. Co. March 18, 1922. pp. 1–8. ISSN 2694-099X. OCLC 15192974.
- "Mississippi shows low lynching record during 1914". East Mississippi Times. January 15, 1915. OCLC 16396509.
- "Negro Hanged by Citizens". Okolona Messenger. Okolona, Chickasaw, Mississippi: Abe Steinberger & Sons. March 9, 1922. pp. 1–8. ISSN 2469-7559. OCLC 16103582.
- United States Senate Committee on the Judiciary (1926). "To Prevent and Punish the Crime of Lynching: Hearings Before the United States Senate Committee on the Judiciary, Subcommittee on S. 121, Sixty-Ninth Congress, First Session, on Feb. 16, 1926". United States Government Publishing Office.
- "Women seize Negro later found hanging to tree". The Washington Times. Washington, District of Columbia: William Randolph Hearst. March 8, 1922. pp. 1–22. ISSN 1941-0697. OCLC 10630160.

| Number | Name | Date | Place | Method of lynching | Number of victims |
|---|---|---|---|---|---|
| 1 | Bill McAllister | January 8, 1922 | Williamsburg, S.C. | Shot | 1 |
| 2 | Lincoln Hickson | January 8, 1922 | Williamsburg, S.C. | Shot | 1 |
| 3 | Willie Jenkins | January 10, 1922 | Eufaula, Alabama | Shot | 1 |
| 4 | Jake Brooks | January 14, 1922 | Oklahoma City, Oklahoma | Hanged | 1 |
| 5 | Charles Strong | January 17, 1922 | Mayo, Florida | Hanged | 1 |
| 6 | Will Bell | January 29, 1922 | Pontotoc, Mississippi | Shot | 1 |
| 7 | Unidentified | January 29, 1922 | Pontotoc, Mississippi | Shot | |
| 8 | Drew Conner (White) | January 28, 1922 | Bolinger, Alabama | Burned | 1 |
| 9 | Will Thrasher | February 1, 1922 | Crystal Springs, Mississippi | Hanged | 1 |
| 10 | Harry Harrison | February 2, 1922 | Malvern, Arkansas | Shot | 1 |
| 11 | Manuel Duarte | February 2, 1922 | Cameron County, Texas | Shot | 1 |
| 12 | P. Norman | February 11, 1922 | Texarkana, Arkansas | Shot | 1 |
| 13 | Will Jones | February 13, 1922 | Ellaville, Georgia | Shot | 1 |
| 14 | William Baker | March 8, 1922 | Aberdeen, Mississippi | Hanged | 1 |
| 15 | Alfred Williams | March 12, 1922 | Harlem, Georgia | Hanged | 1 |
| 16 | Brown Culpepper (White) | March 13, 1922 | Holly Grove, Louisiana | Shot | 1 |
| 17 | Jerry Ingram | March 17, 1922 | Crawford, Mississippi | Shot | 1 |
| 18 | Unidentified (white) | March 19, 1922 | Okay, Oklahoma | Drowned | 1 |
| 19 | Alexander Smith | March 22, 1922 | Gulfport, Mississippi | Hanged | 1 |
| 20 | Snap Curry | May 6, 1922 | Kirvin, Texas | Burned | 1 |
| 21 | H. Varney (or Johnnie Cornish) | May 6, 1922 | Kirvin, Texas | Burned | 1 |
| 22 | Mose Jones | May 6, 1922 | Kirvin, Texas | Burned | 1 |
| 23 | Tom Cornish | May 8, 1922 | Kirvin, Texas | Hanged | 1 |
| 24 | Thomas Early | May 17, 1922 | Conroe, Texas | Burned | 1 |
| 25 | Charles Atkins | May 18, 1922 | Davisboro, Georgia | Burned | 1 |
| 26 | Hullen Owens | May 19, 1922 | Texarkana, Texas | Hanged (body burned) | 1 |
| 27 | Joe Winters | May 20, 1922 | Conroe, Texas | Burned | 1 |
| 28 | Mose Bozier | May 20, 1922 | Alleyton, Texas | Hanged | 1 |
| 29 | Gilbert Wilson | May 23, 1922 | Bryan, Texas | Beaten to death | 1 |
| 30 | Jesse Thomas | May 26, 1922 | Waco, Texas | Shot (body burned) | 1 |
| 31 | William Byrd | May 28, 1922 | Brentwood, Georgia | Shot (body burned) | 1 |
| 32 | Robert Collins | June 20, 1922 | Summit, Mississippi | Hanged | 1 |
| 33 | Warren Lewis | June 23, 1922 | New Dacus, Texas | Hanged | 1 |
| 34 | James Harvey | July 1, 1922 | Lanes Bridge, Georgia | Hanged | 1 |
| 35 | Joe Jordan | July 1, 1922 | Lanes Bridge, Georgia | Hanged | 1 |
| 36 | Philip Tankard | July 5, 1922 | Belhaven, North Carolina | Shot | 1 |
| 37 | Joe Pemberton | July 7, 1922 | Benton, Louisiana | Hanged | 1 |
| 38 | Jake "Shake" Davis | July 14, 1922 | Miller County, Georgia | Hanged | 1 |
| 39 | Oscar Mack | July 18, 1922 | Orange County, Florida | Hanged (False report, Oscar Mack survived) | 1 |
| 40 | Will Anderson | July 24, 1922 | Allentown, Georgia | Shot | 1 |
| 41 | John West | July 28, 1922 | Guernsey, Arkansas | Shot | 1 |
| 42 | Gilbert Harris | August 1, 1922 | Hot Springs, Arkansas | Hanged | 1 |
| 43 | John Glover | August 1, 1922 | Holton, | Shot | 1 |
| 44 | Bayner Blackwell | August 6, 1922 | Swansboro, North Carolina | Shot | 1 |
| 45 | John Steelman | August 23, 1922 | Lambert, Mississippi | Burned | 1 |
| 46 | Thomas Rivers | August 30, 1922 | Bossier Parish, Louisiana | Hanged | 1 |
| 47 | F. Watt Daniels (White) | August 1922 | Mer Rouge, Louisiana | Ku-Klux Klan | 1 |
| 48 | Thomas F. Richards (White) | August 1922 | Mer Rouge, Louisiana | Ku-Klux Klan | 1 |
| 49 | Jim Reed Long | September 2, 1922 | Winder, Georgia | Ku-Klux Klan | 1 |
| 50 | O.J. Johnson | September 7, 1922 | Newton, Texas | Hanged | 1 |
| 51 | Jim Johnston | September 28, 1922 | Sandersville, Georgia | Hanged | 1 |
| 52 | Grover C. Everett | September 28, 1922 | Abilene, Texas | Shot | 1 |
| 53 | John Brown | October 3, 1922 | Montgomery, Alabama | Shot | 1 |
| 54 | Ed Hartley (white) | October 20, 1922 | Camden, Tennessee | Shot | 1 |
| 55 | George Hartley (white) | October 20, 1922 | Camden, Tennessee | Shot | 1 |
| 56 | Elias V. Zarate | November 11, 1922 | Weslaco, Texas | Shot | 1 |
| 57 | Cupid Dickson / Cubrit Dixon | December 5, 1922 | Madison, Florida | Shot | 1 |
| 58 | Charles Wright | December 8 ,1922 | Perry, Florida | Burned | 1 |
| 59 | Less Smith | December 9, 1922 | Morrilton, Arkansas | Burned | 1 |
| 60 | George Gay | December 11, 1922 | Streetman, Texas | Hanged | 1 |
| 61 | Arthur Young | December 11, 1922 | Perry, Florida | Hanged | 1 |
