= Central Grove, Mississippi =

- Unincorporated community
- Location within Mississippi Location within the United States
- Coordinates: 34°00′32″N 88°36′20″W
- Country: United States
- State: Mississippi
- County: Monroe
- Elevation: 220 ft (67 m)
- Time zone: UTC-6 (Central (CST))
  - Summer (DST): UTC-5 (CDT)
- Area code: 662
- GNIS feature ID: 687372

Central Grove (also rendered as Centralgrove) is an unincorporated community in Monroe County, Mississippi. Central Grove is located west of Amory and south of Nettleton.

== History ==
In 1900, Central Grove had an estimated population of 23.

A post office operated under the name Central Grove from 1879 to 1905.
