= Gattman, Mississippi =

- Village
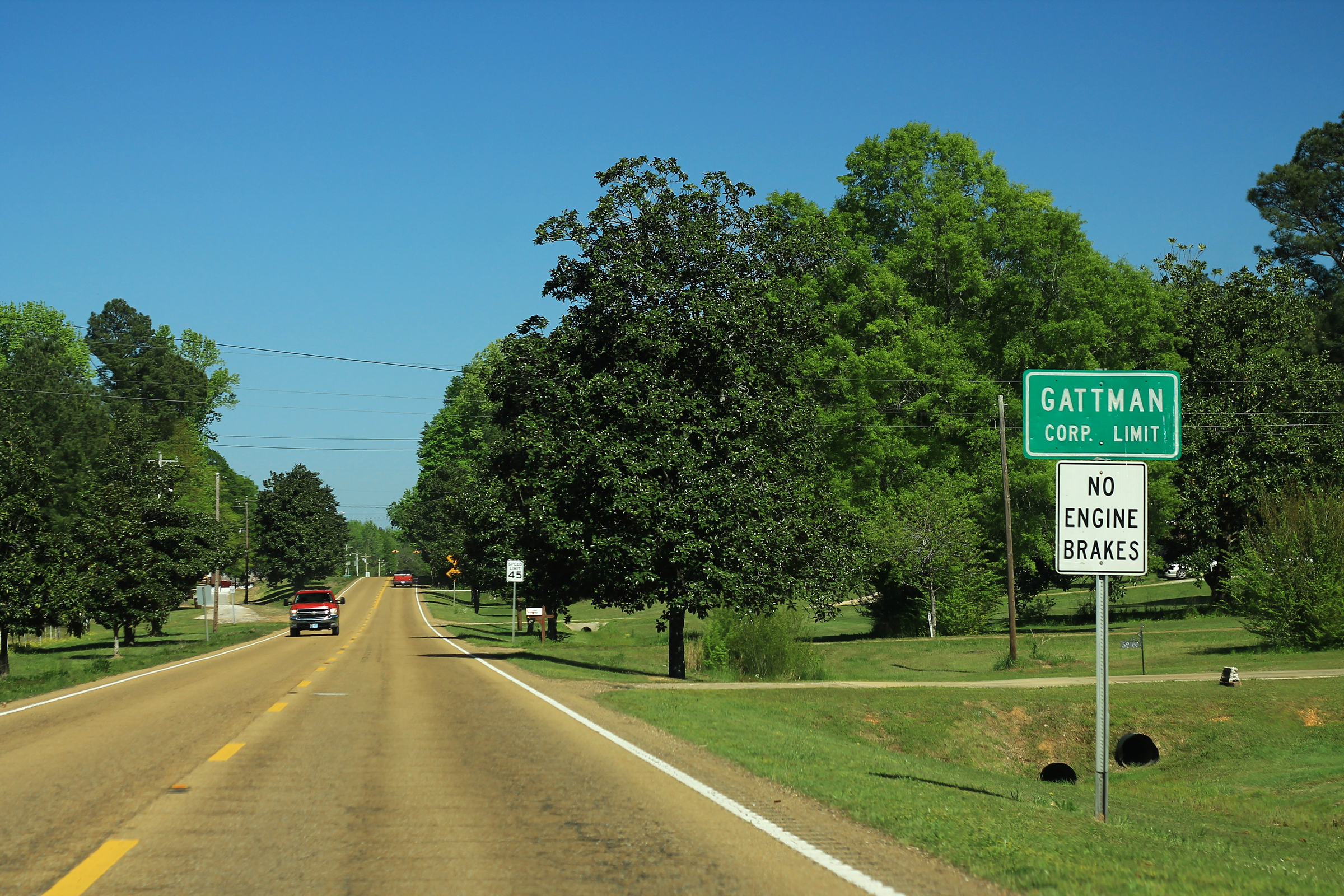

- Location in Monroe County and the state of Mississippi

- Location in the United States
- Coordinates: 33°53′7.39″N 88°14′7.13″W
- Country: United States
- State: Mississippi
- County: Monroe

Area
  - Total: 0.56 sq mi (1.46 km^{2})
  - Land: 0.56 sq mi (1.46 km^{2})
  - Water: 0 sq mi (0.00 km^{2})
- Elevation: 300 ft (90 m)

Population (2020)
  - Total: 77
  - Density: 136.9/sq mi (52.87/km^{2})
- Time zone: UTC-6 (Central (CST))
  - Summer (DST): UTC-5 (CDT)
- ZIP codes: 38844 (Gattman); 39740 (Caledonia)
- Area code: 662
- FIPS code: 28-26780
- GNIS feature ID: 670338

Gattman is a village in Monroe County, Mississippi. The population was 77 at the 2020 census, down from 90 in 2010.

== Geography ==
Gattman is located in eastern Monroe County at 33°53′7.39″N 88°14′7.13″W (33.8853865, -88.2353142). It is bordered to the east by the state of Alabama. U.S. Route 278 passes through the village, leading northwest 17 miles (27 km) to Amory and east 6 miles (10 km) to Sulligent. Aberdeen, the Monroe county seat, is 20 miles (32 km) to the southwest via US 278 and Mississippi Highway 8.

According to the U.S. Census Bureau, the village of Gattman has a total area of 0.56 square miles (1.5 km^{2}), all land. The Buttahatchee River passes just north of the village limits, flowing west and then south to join the Tombigbee River near Columbus Air Force Base.

== Demographics ==
Historical population
Census	Pop.	Note	%±
1900	111		—
1910	155		39.6%
1920	151		−2.6%
1930	158		4.6%
1940	186		17.7%
1950	150		−19.4%
1960	145		−3.3%
1970	175		20.7%
1980	151		−13.7%
1990	120		−20.5%
2000	114		−5.0%
2010	90		−21.1%
2020	77		−14.4%
U.S. Decennial Census

As of the census of 2000, there were 114 people, 50 households, and 34 families residing in the village. The population density was 202.8 inhabitants per square mile (78.3/km^{2}). There were 53 housing units at an average density of 94.3 per square mile (36.4/km^{2}). The racial makeup of the village was 95.61% White and 4.39% African American.

There were 50 households, out of which 22.0% had children under the age of 18 living with them, 54.0% were married couples living together, 10.0% had a female householder with no husband present, and 32.0% were non-families. 32.0% of all households were made up of individuals, and 10.0% had someone living alone who was 65 years of age or older. The average household size was 2.28 and the average family size was 2.79.

In the village, the population was spread out, with 16.7% under the age of 18, 9.6% from 18 to 24, 21.9% from 25 to 44, 35.1% from 45 to 64, and 16.7% who were 65 years of age or older. The median age was 46 years. For every 100 females, there were 86.9 males. For every 100 females age 18 and over, there were 86.3 males.

The median income for a household in the village was $35,357, and the median income for a family was $37,000. Males had a median income of $27,083 versus $18,750 for females. The per capita income for the village was $15,533. There were no families and 2.2% of the population living below the poverty line, including no under eighteens and 11.8% of those over 64.

== Education ==
Gattman is served by the Monroe County School District.
