= Monroe County School District (Mississippi) =

School district in Mississippi

The Monroe County School District is a public school district based in Monroe County, Mississippi (USA).

The district serves the communities of Smithville, Hatley, Gattman, Hamilton, and New Hamilton as well as a small portion of Amory.

== Schools ==
Home Campus sites

- Hamilton School (Grades K-12)
- Hatley School (Grades K-12)
- Smithville School (Grades K-12)

Off Campus sites

- Monroe County Advanced Learning Center (Grades 10-12)
- Monroe County Vocational and Technical Center (Grades 10-12)

== Demographics ==
=== 2019-20 school year ===
As of the 2019-20 school year there were 2,137 students enrolled in Monroe County School District & 167 teachers working in the district.

=== 2006-07 school year ===
There were a total of 2,378 students enrolled in the Monroe County School District during the 2006–2007 school year. The gender makeup of the district was 49% female and 51% male. The racial makeup of the district was 9.67% African American, 89.53% White, 0.63% Hispanic, and 0.17% Asian. 37.7% of the district's students were eligible to receive free lunch.

Pre 2007-07 school years
School Year	Enrollment	Gender Makeup		Racial Makeup				
School Year	Enrollment	Female	Male	Asian	African American	Hispanic	Native American	White
2005-06	2,494	48%	52%	0.12%	9.90%	0.64%	–	89.33%
2004-05	2,524	48%	52%	0.12%	9.90%	0.91%	0.08%	88.99%
2003-04	2,602	48%	52%	0.19%	9.92%	0.73%	0.08%	89.09%
2002-03	2,619	48%	52%	0.19%	9.74%	1.76%	–	88.32%

== Accountability statistics ==
2002-2007
	2002-03	2003-04	2004-05	2005-06	2006-07
District Accreditation Status	Accredited	Accredited	Accredited	Accredited	Accredited
School Performance Classifications					
Level 5 (Superior Performing) Schools	1	1	0	0	0
Level 4 (Exemplary) Schools	3	2	2	3	3
Level 3 (Successful) Schools	0	1	2	1	0
Level 2 (Under Performing) Schools	0	0	0	0	0
Level 1 (Low Performing) Schools	0	0	0	0	0
Not Assigned	0	0	0	0	1

== See also ==
- Amory School District
- Aberdeen School District
- List of school districts in Mississippi
