= Greenwood Springs, Mississippi =

- Unincorporated community
- Location within Mississippi Location within the United States
- Coordinates: 33°53′13″N 88°18′32″W
- Country: United States
- State: Mississippi
- County: Monroe
- Elevation: 295 ft (90 m)
- Time zone: UTC-6 (Central (CST))
  - Summer (DST): UTC-5 (CDT)
- ZIP code: 38848
- Area code: 662
- GNIS feature ID: 670727

Greenwood Springs is an unincorporated community in Monroe County, Mississippi. Greenwood Springs is located east of Amory on U.S. Route 278.

== History ==
Greenwood Springs is named for the nearby mineral spring, which is in turn named for Thomas Greenwood, who moved to the area from Alabama in 1821. Multiple hotels have existed near the springs to allow visitors to take part in the purported healing qualities of the mineral springs. The community was also once home to a sawmill and school.

Greenwood Springs is located along the BNSF Railway.

Greenwood Springs is served by the Greenwood Springs Community Center.

A post office first began operating under the name Greenwood Springs in 1896.

Natural gas is collected at the Greenwood Springs Field near Greenwood Springs.
