= Monroe County, Mississippi =

County in Mississippi, United States

- County
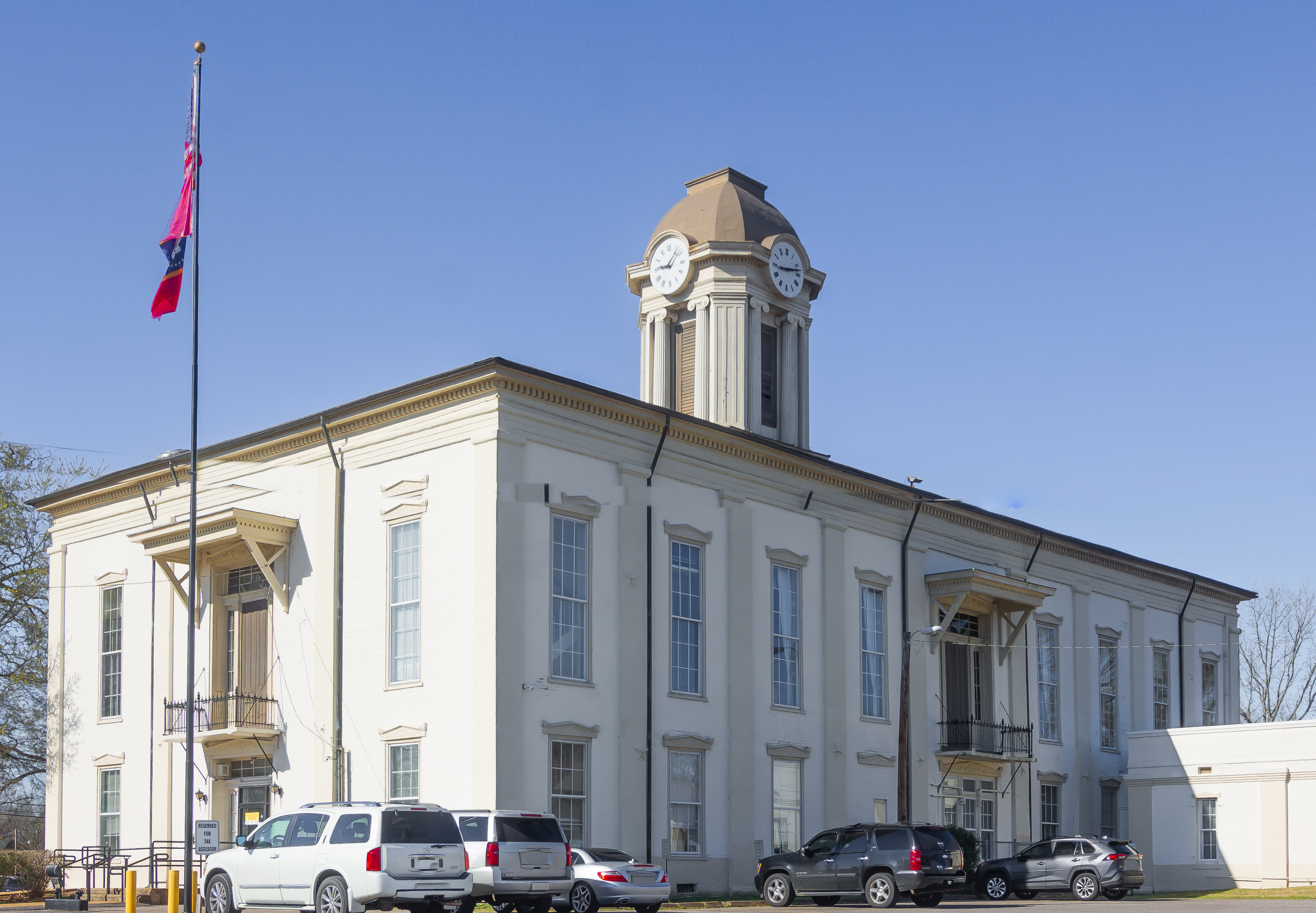
- Monroe County Courthouse in Aberdeen

- Location within the U.S. state of Mississippi
- Coordinates: 33°53′N 88°29′W
- Country: United States
- State: Mississippi
- Founded: 1821
- Named for: James Monroe
- Seat: Aberdeen
- Largest city: Amory

Area
  - Total: 772 sq mi (2,000 km^{2})
  - Land: 765 sq mi (1,980 km^{2})
  - Water: 7.0 sq mi (18 km^{2}) 0.9%

Population (2020)
  - Total: 34,180
  - Estimate (2025): 33,318 ▼
  - Density: 44.7/sq mi (17.3/km^{2})
- Time zone: UTC−6 (Central)
  - Summer (DST): UTC−5 (CDT)
- Congressional district: 1st
- Website: www.monroems.com

Monroe County is a county on the northeast border of the U.S. state of Mississippi next to Alabama. As of the 2020 census, the population was 34,180. Its county seat is Aberdeen.

== History ==
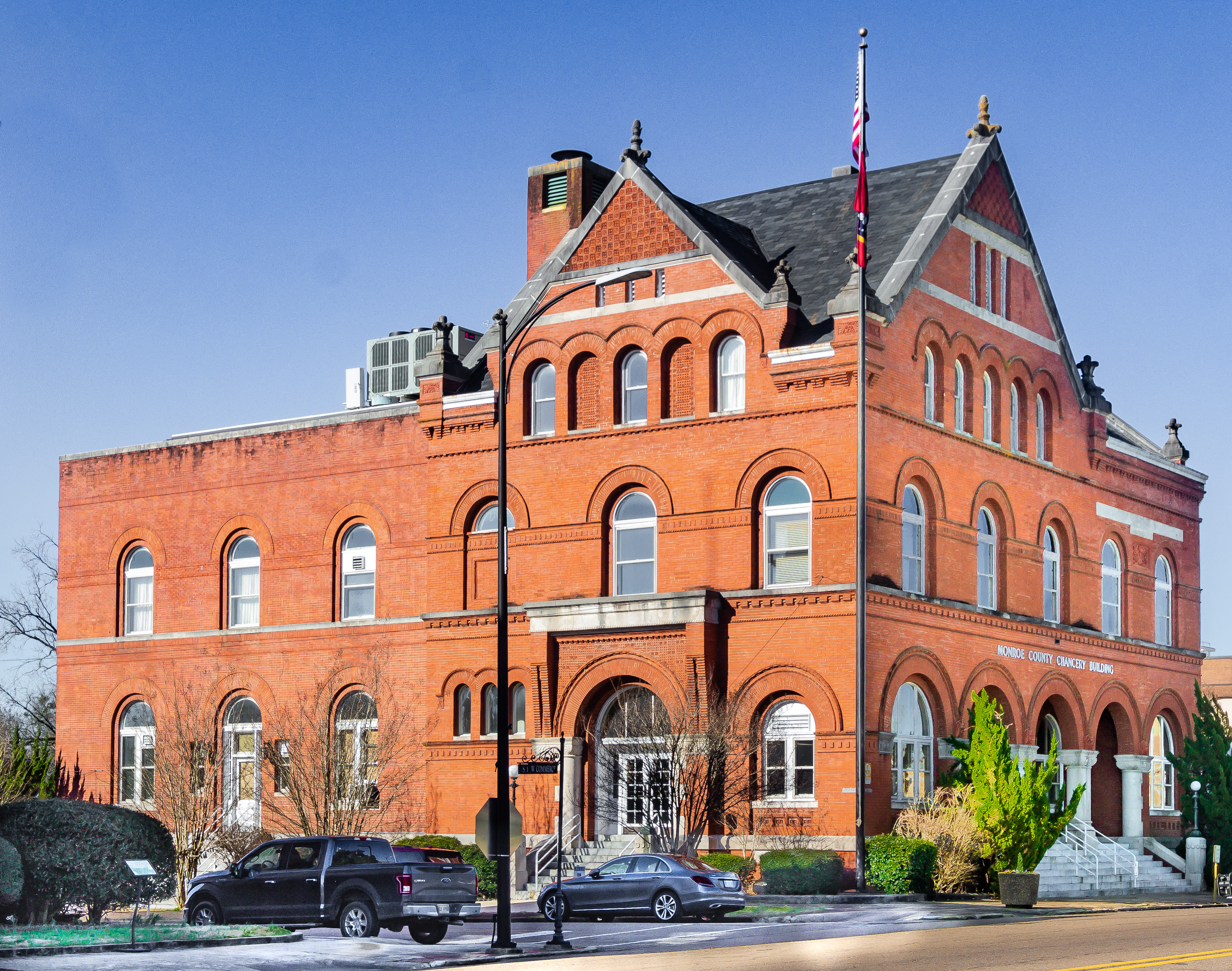
The U.S. Courthouse and Post Office (now the Monroe County Chancery Building) in Aberdeen.

The county is named in honor of James Monroe, the fifth President of the United States. Part of the county east of the Tombigbee River originally made-up part of the Alabama Territory, belonging to Marion County, until new lines of demarcation put it in the State of Mississippi in 1821.

In 1889, an African-American man, Keith Bowen was lynched by a mob in the Lebanon community six miles south of Aberdeen after he was found in a white girl's bedroom at 3:00 AM."

In 1922, William Baker, an 18-year-old African-American man was lynched in Monroe County by a white mob.

== Geography ==
According to the U.S. Census Bureau, the county has a total area of 772 square miles (2,000 km^{2}), of which 765 square miles (1,980 km^{2}) is land and 7.0 square miles (18 km^{2}) (0.9%) is water.

In 1922, the Commissioner of Agriculture for the county published a report in a local newspaper which described in some detail the soil conditions and agriculture of the county. He described the areas as the Black Lands and the soil as black lime, a "stiff" soil, derived from the Selma chalk formation and extremely rich in potassium and phosphorus.

=== Flora ===
Sweet clover is an indigenous wild ground cover in the county.

=== Major highways ===
- U.S. Highway 45
- U.S. Highway 278
- Mississippi Highway 6
- Mississippi Highway 8
- Mississippi Highway 25
- Mississippi Highway 145

=== Adjacent counties ===
- Lowndes County (south)
- Clay County (southwest)
- Chickasaw County (west)
- Lee County (northwest)
- Itawamba County (north)
- Lamar County, Alabama (east)
- Marion County, Alabama (northeast)

== Demographics ==
Historical population
Census	Pop.	Note	%±
1820	2,721		—
1830	3,861		41.9%
1840	9,250		139.6%
1850	21,172		128.9%
1860	21,283		0.5%
1870	22,631		6.3%
1880	28,553		26.2%
1890	30,730		7.6%
1900	31,216		1.6%
1910	35,178		12.7%
1920	32,613		−7.3%
1930	36,141		10.8%
1940	37,648		4.2%
1950	36,543		−2.9%
1960	33,953		−7.1%
1970	34,043		0.3%
1980	36,404		6.9%
1990	36,582		0.5%
2000	38,014		3.9%
2010	36,989		−2.7%
2020	34,180		−7.6%
2025 (est.)	33,318	▼	−2.5%
U.S. Decennial Census; 1790-1960 1900-1990; 1990-2000 2010–2020

=== Racial and ethnic composition ===
Monroe County, Mississippi – Racial and ethnic composition Note: the US Census treats Hispanic/Latino as an ethnic category. This table excludes Latinos from the racial categories and assigns them to a separate category. Hispanics/Latinos may be of any race.
Race / Ethnicity (NH = Non-Hispanic)	Pop 1980	Pop 1990	Pop 2000	Pop 2010	Pop 2020	% 1980	% 1990	% 2000	% 2010	% 2020
White alone (NH)	25,460	25,321	25,832	24,847	22,487	69.94%	69.22%	67.95%	67.17%	65.79%
Black or African American alone (NH)	10,674	11,021	11,652	11,381	10,311	29.32%	30.13%	30.65%	30.77%	30.17%
Native American or Alaska Native alone (NH)	12	24	36	57	50	0.03%	0.07%	0.09%	0.15%	0.15%
Asian alone (NH)	15	28	66	71	67	0.04%	0.08%	0.17%	0.19%	0.20%
Native Hawaiian or Pacific Islander alone (NH)	x	x	4	4	3	x	x	0.01%	0.01%	0.01%
Other race alone (NH)	13	2	10	13	44	0.04%	0.01%	0.03%	0.04%	0.13%
Mixed race or Multiracial (NH)	x	x	153	261	745	x	x	0.40%	0.71%	2.18%
Hispanic or Latino (any race)	230	186	261	355	473	0.63%	0.51%	0.69%	0.96%	1.38%
Total	36,404	36,582	38,014	36,989	34,180	100.00%	100.00%	100.00%	100.00%	100.00%

=== 2020 census ===
As of the 2020 United States census, the county had a population of 34,180. The median age was 43.1 years. 22.1% of residents were under the age of 18 and 20.4% of residents were 65 years of age or older. For every 100 females there were 92.4 males, and for every 100 females age 18 and over there were 89.2 males age 18 and over.

The racial makeup of the county was 66.2% White, 30.2% Black or African American, 0.2% American Indian and Alaska Native, 0.2% Asian, <0.1% Native Hawaiian and Pacific Islander, 0.6% from some other race, and 2.6% from two or more races. Hispanic or Latino residents of any race comprised 1.4% of the population.

17.5% of residents lived in urban areas, while 82.5% lived in rural areas.

There were 13,981 households in the county, of which 29.2% had children under the age of 18 living in them. Of all households, 45.0% were married-couple households, 18.5% were households with a male householder and no spouse or partner present, and 31.8% were households with a female householder and no spouse or partner present. About 29.2% of all households were made up of individuals and 13.7% had someone living alone who was 65 years of age or older.

There were 16,714 housing units, of which 16.4% were vacant. Among occupied housing units, 76.8% were owner-occupied and 23.2% were renter-occupied. The homeowner vacancy rate was 1.0% and the rental vacancy rate was 29.4%.

=== 2000 census ===
As of the census of 2000, there were 38,014 people, 14,603 households, and 10,660 families residing in the county. The population density was 50 people per square mile (19 people/km^{2}). There were 16,236 housing units at an average density of 21 units per square mile (8.1 units/km^{2}). The racial makeup of the county was 68.37% White, 30.77% Black or African American, 0.10% Native American, 0.17% Asian, 0.01% Pacific Islander, 0.11% from other races, and 0.47% from two or more races. 0.69% of the population were Hispanic or Latino of any race.

There were 14,603 households, out of which 34.70% had children under the age of 18 living with them, 52.00% were married couples living together, 17.20% had a female householder with no husband present, and 27.00% were non-families. 24.70% of all households were made up of individuals, and 11.80% had someone living alone who was 65 years of age or older. The average household size was 2.57 and the average family size was 3.07.

In the county, the population was spread out, with 27.20% under the age of 18, 8.70% from 18 to 24, 27.60% from 25 to 44, 22.50% from 45 to 64, and 14.00% who were 65 years of age or older. The median age was 36 years. For every 100 females there were 89.70 males. For every 100 females age 18 and over, there were 84.70 males age 18 and over.

The median income for a household in the county was $30,307, and the median income for a family was $36,749. Males had a median income of $30,232 versus $20,411 for females. The per capita income for the county was $14,072. About 13.60% of families and 17.20% of the population were below the poverty line, including 22.30% of those under age 18 and 21.70% of those age 65 or over.

== Economy ==
As of 1922, both the largest creamery and the largest hog-feeding plant "in the South" were located in the county.

As of 1922, corn was the most important grain crop grown in the county. Corn was typically planted after the planting and harvest of a crop of clover or oats. At that time, oat crops typically yielded forty to sixty bushels per acre. Other crops grown, either for harvest or pasture, included wheat, rye, barley, rape, cotton, Japan clover. Monroe had the largest acreage devoted to alfalfa production and exported more alfalfa hay than any other county in the state.

As of 2021, US Silica operates a bentonite mine located several miles south of Aberdeen, near the community of Darracott, where bentonite is extracted before being refined into petrochemicals and animal feed.

== Communities ==
=== Cities ===
- Aberdeen (county seat)
- Amory
- Nettleton (partly in Lee County)

=== Towns ===
- Hatley
- Smithville

=== Village ===
- Gattman

=== Census-designated places ===
- Hamilton
- New Hamilton

=== Other unincorporated communities ===
- Athens
- Becker
- Bigbee
- Binford
- Bristow
- Central Grove
- Darracott
- Flinn
- Gibson
- Greenwood Springs
- Lackey
- Mormon Springs
- Muldon
- Parham
- Prairie
- Quincy
- Riggins
- Sipsey Fork
- Splunge
- Strong
- Tranquil
- Westville
- Wise Gap
- Wren

=== Ghost towns ===
- Bolivar
- Camargo
- Cotton Gin Port

== Politics ==
Ever since 1980, when Democrat Jimmy Carter carried the county by 18 points, Monroe has shifted to becoming a Republican stronghold, increasingly so in recent presidential elections. Donald Trump's 2024 performance was the best by a Republican since the lopsided 1972 election.

United States presidential election results for Monroe County, Mississippi
Year	Republican		Democratic		Third party(ies)	
Year	No.	%	No.	%	No.	%
1912	25	1.74%	1,377	95.76%	36	2.50%
1916	82	4.60%	1,684	94.55%	15	0.84%
1920	139	6.83%	1,881	92.48%	14	0.69%
1924	121	4.88%	2,326	93.83%	32	1.29%
1928	376	11.03%	3,033	88.97%	0	0.00%
1932	82	2.32%	3,448	97.59%	3	0.08%
1936	55	1.69%	3,199	98.22%	3	0.09%
1940	94	2.80%	3,263	97.11%	3	0.09%
1944	159	4.87%	3,104	95.13%	0	0.00%
1948	54	1.82%	624	21.09%	2,281	77.09%
1952	1,417	28.75%	3,512	71.25%	0	0.00%
1956	705	15.25%	3,630	78.50%	289	6.25%
1960	1,400	28.81%	1,901	39.12%	1,559	32.08%
1964	5,627	85.10%	985	14.90%	0	0.00%
1968	1,167	11.08%	1,506	14.30%	7,856	74.61%
1972	7,273	84.10%	1,279	14.79%	96	1.11%
1976	4,737	42.17%	6,097	54.27%	400	3.56%
1980	4,793	39.16%	6,998	57.18%	448	3.66%
1984	7,387	62.28%	4,437	37.41%	36	0.30%
1988	6,447	57.70%	4,669	41.79%	57	0.51%
1992	5,994	49.03%	4,933	40.36%	1,297	10.61%
1996	5,206	45.97%	5,184	45.78%	934	8.25%
2000	7,397	55.37%	5,783	43.29%	180	1.35%
2004	9,308	59.54%	6,237	39.90%	87	0.56%
2008	10,184	58.21%	7,169	40.98%	143	0.82%
2012	9,723	57.47%	7,056	41.71%	139	0.82%
2016	10,167	64.01%	5,524	34.78%	193	1.22%
2020	11,177	64.76%	5,874	34.03%	208	1.21%
2024	10,861	67.59%	5,090	31.68%	118	0.73%

== Education ==
School districts in the county include:

- Aberdeen School District
- Amory School District
- Monroe County School District
- Nettleton School District
- Okolona Separate School District

== See also ==
- National Register of Historic Places listings in Monroe County, Mississippi
- Camp Seminole, Pushmataha Area Council
