= Hamilton, Mississippi =

- Census-designated place
- Location within Mississippi Location within the United States
- Coordinates: 33°44′24″N 88°24′41″W
- Country: United States
- State: Mississippi
- County: Monroe

Area
  - Total: 3.18 sq mi (8.2 km^{2})
  - Land: 3.15 sq mi (8.2 km^{2})
  - Water: 0.02 sq mi (0.052 km^{2})
- Elevation: 243 ft (74 m)

Population (2020)
  - Total: 404
  - Density: 128.09/sq mi (49.46/km^{2})
- Time zone: UTC-6 (Central (CST))
  - Summer (DST): UTC-5 (CDT)
- ZIP Code: 39746
- GNIS feature ID: 670857
- FIPS Code: 28-30220

Hamilton is a census-designated place and unincorporated community in Monroe County, Mississippi, United States. As of the 2020 census, it had a population of 404.

== History ==
Hamilton was the first county seat of Monroe County. In 1830, Monroe County was split to form Lowndes County to the south, and the county seat of Monroe County was moved north to Aberdeen.

The community of Hamilton, also referred to as "Old Hamilton", is approximately 2 miles (3 km) east of the larger community of New Hamilton, established in the late 1880s with the arrival of the Kansas City, Memphis and Birmingham Railroad.

== Geography ==
Hamilton is in southern Monroe County and is bordered to the west by New Hamilton. Aberdeen, the county seat, is 11 miles (18 km) to the northwest. According to the U.S. Census Bureau, the Hamilton CDP has an area of 3.2 square miles (8.3 km^{2}), of which 0.02 square miles (0.05 km^{2}), or 0.76%, are water. Cedar Grove Creek forms the southeast edge of the community, while Wilson Creek runs just west of the town center. The two creeks join at the southwest corner of the community to form McKinley Creek, a short west-flowing tributary of the Tombigbee River.

== Demographics ==
Historical population
Census	Pop.	Note	%±
2010	457		—
2020	404		−11.6%
U.S. Decennial Census

Hamilton first appeared as a census designated place in the 2010 U.S. census.

=== Racial and ethnic composition ===
Hamilton CDP, Mississippi – Racial and ethnic composition Note: the US Census treats Hispanic/Latino as an ethnic category. This table excludes Latinos from the racial categories and assigns them to a separate category. Hispanics/Latinos may be of any race.
Race / Ethnicity (NH = Non-Hispanic)	Pop 2010	Pop 2020	% 2010	% 2020
White alone (NH)	426	372	93.22%	92.08%
Black or African American alone (NH)	18	22	3.94%	5.45%
Native American or Alaska Native alone (NH)	0	0	0.00%	0.00%
Asian alone (NH)	1	1	0.22%	0.25%
Native Hawaiian or Pacific Islander alone (NH)	0	0	0.00%	0.00%
Other race alone (NH)	0	0	0.00%	0.00%
Mixed race or Multiracial (NH)	7	4	1.53%	0.99%
Hispanic or Latino (any race)	5	5	1.09%	1.24%
Total	457	404	100.00%	100.00%

== Education ==
It is in the Monroe County School District.

Hamilton Attendance Center (also known as Hamilton School), a K-12 school of that district, is located in the community.

== Notable people ==
- J. W. Alexander, gospel musician
- Don Smith, professional football player
