= Smithville, Mississippi =

- Town
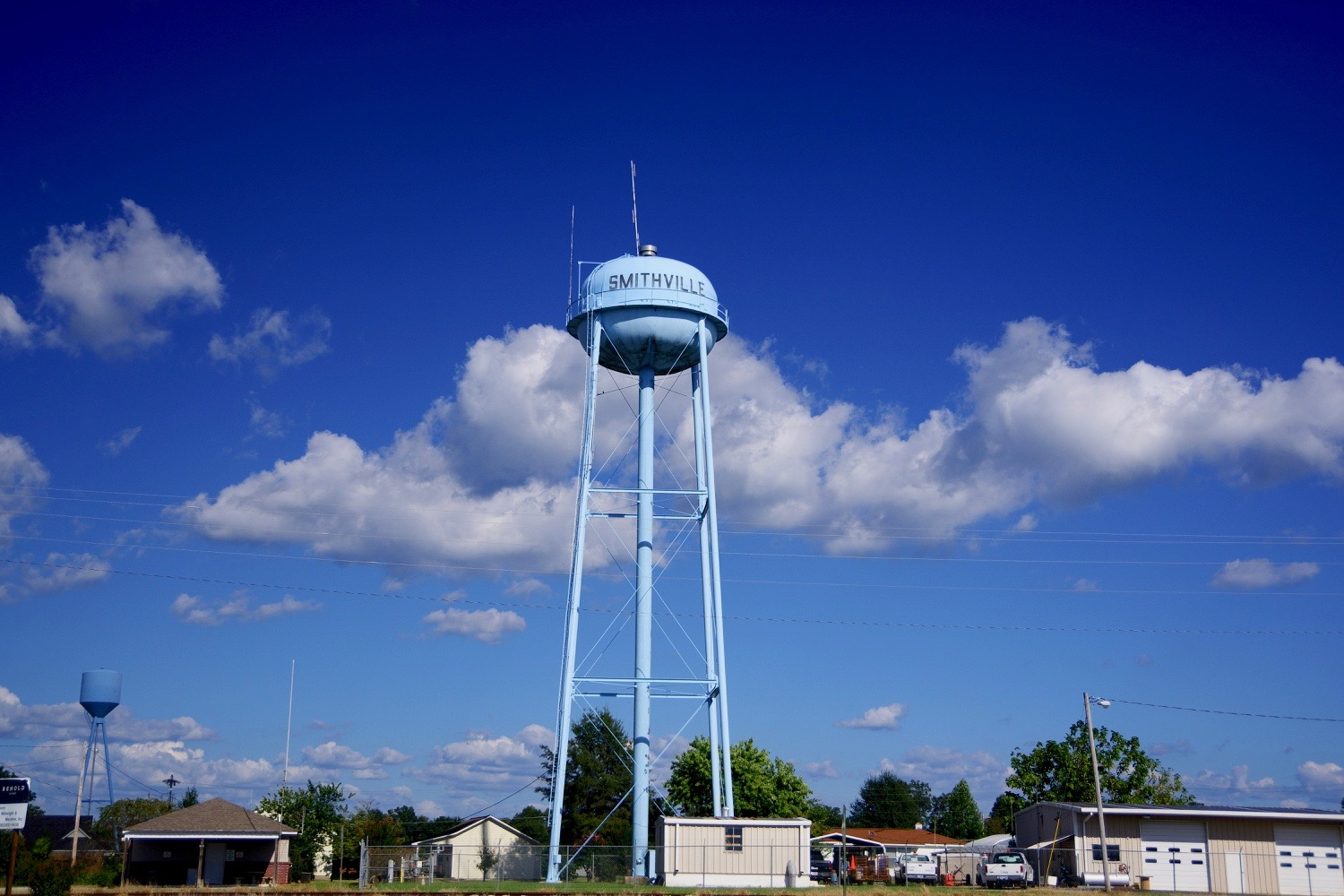
- Water tower in Smithville (2018)
- Motto: "Dig in and grow with us"
- Location in Monroe County and the state of Mississippi

- Location in the United States
- Coordinates: 34°4′7″N 88°23′44″W
- Country: United States
- State: Mississippi
- County: Monroe

Area
  - Total: 1.61 sq mi (4.17 km^{2})
  - Land: 1.48 sq mi (3.84 km^{2})
  - Water: 0.12 sq mi (0.32 km^{2})
- Elevation: 260 ft (80 m)

Population (2020)
  - Total: 509
  - Density: 343.0/sq mi (132.45/km^{2})
- Time zone: UTC-6 (Central (CST))
  - Summer (DST): UTC-5 (CDT)
- ZIP code: 38870
- Area code: 662
- FIPS code: 28-68720
- GNIS feature ID: 0677945
- Website: smithvillems.org

Smithville is a town in Monroe County, Mississippi, United States. The population was 509 at the 2020 census, down from 942 in 2010.

== History ==
Smithville is located on lands purchased from Chickasaw chief Che-lah-cha-chubby in 1836. The town is named for William Smith, an early settler who established a store at the site around 1840. The town was incorporated in 1845.

=== 2011 tornado ===
On April 27, 2011, at approximately 3:45 p.m. CDT, an EF5 tornado struck the town with winds which were estimated to have peaked at 205 mph (330 km/h). A total of 16 people were killed, and 40 people were injured. In total, 117 structures were destroyed and 50 more sustained major damage from the storm in Monroe County alone, before the tornado continued into Itawamba County. In Smithville, an SUV was lofted and thrown a half mile into the water tower, making a dent, before being carried even further downwind. Other damage included the destruction of the city hall, post office, police station, and four churches, along with appliances and plumbing fixtures being shredded or ripped away from foundations and numerous granite tombstones being knocked down.

== Geography ==
Smithville is located in northern Monroe County at 34°4′7″N 88°23′44″W (34.068605, -88.395486). The town is situated along the east bank of the Tennessee-Tombigbee Waterway. The waterway's Glover Wilkins Lock is located just downstream (west). Mississippi Highway 25 traverses Smithville, connecting the town with Fulton to the north and Amory to the south.

According to the U.S. Census Bureau, the town has a total area of 1.6 square miles (4.1 km^{2}), of which 1.5 square miles (3.9 km^{2}) are land and 0.1 square miles (0.26 km^{2}), or 7.71%, are water.

== Demographics ==
Historical population
Census	Pop.	Note	%±
1900	150		—
1910	179		19.3%
1920	138		−22.9%
1930	401		190.6%
1940	402		0.2%
1950	419		4.2%
1960	489		16.7%
1970	552		12.9%
1980	866		56.9%
1990	871		0.6%
2000	882		1.3%
2010	942		6.8%
2020	509		−46.0%
U.S. Decennial Census

As of the census of 2000, there were 882 people, 365 households, and 243 families residing in the town. The population density 602.1 people per square mile (233.2/km^{2}). There were 404 housing units at an average density of 275.8 per square mile (106.5/km^{2}). The racial makeup of the town is 97.62% White, 1.59% African American, 0.11% Native American, 0.23% Asian, 0.23% from other races, and 0.23% from two or more races. Hispanic or Latino of any race were 0.79% of the population.

There were 365 households, out of which 33.7% had children under the age of 18 living with them, 47.9% were married couples living together, 14.5% had a female householder with no husband present, and 33.4% were non-families. 32.1% of all households were made up of individuals, and 18.4% had someone living alone who 65 years of age or older. The average household size 2.42 and the average family size 3.03.

In the town, the population spread out, with 26.2% under the age of 18, 10.2% from 18 to 24, 25.2% from 25 to 44, 22.9% from 45 to 64, and 15.5% who were 65 years of age or older. The median age 36 years. For every 100 females, there were 95.1 males. For every 100 females age 18 and over, there were 83.9 males.

The median income for a household in the town $32,583, and the median income for a family $38,750. Males had a median income of $30,294 versus $23,958 for females. The per capita income for the town $14,030. About 7.1% of families and 11.2% of the population were below the poverty line, including 9.7% of those under age 18 and 18.7% of those age 65 or over.

== Education ==
Smithville is served by the Monroe County School District.

Smithville High School won two 1A football state championships in 1993 and 1998. The school previously vied for the title in 1989, losing to a Mt. Olive (MS) team quarterbacked by future NFL great Steve McNair. The Smithville High School softball team won the 1A state championship in 2008, 2011, and 2012. The Smithville High School Band has won two state marching championships.

== Notable people ==
- Rod Brasfield, a member of the Country Music Hall of Fame and former member of the Grand Ole Opry
- Anthony J. Cox, former member of the Mississippi State Senate
- Mississippi Slim, country singer and former member of the Grand Ole Opry
- Frances Irene Reels, screenwriter and actress
