= Hatley, Mississippi =

- Town
- Location in Monroe County and the state of Mississippi

- Location in the United States
- Coordinates: 33°58′47″N 88°25′34″W
- Country: United States
- State: Mississippi
- County: Monroe

Area
  - Total: 1.37 sq mi (3.54 km^{2})
  - Land: 1.37 sq mi (3.54 km^{2})
  - Water: 0 sq mi (0.00 km^{2})
- Elevation: 351 ft (107 m)

Population (2020)
  - Total: 495
  - Density: 362.3/sq mi (139.88/km^{2})
- Time zone: UTC-6 (Central (CST))
  - Summer (DST): UTC-5 (CDT)
- ZIP code: 38821
- Area code: 662
- FIPS code: 28-30980
- GNIS feature ID: 0671011

Hatley is a town in Monroe County, Mississippi. The population was 495 at the 2020 census.

== History ==
When Hatley became a town it was on land owned by the Tubb family and named "Tubb's Crossroads". Several years later a group of Seventh-day Adventists migrated into the area, took control of town government in subsequent elections and renamed it "Hatley" in honor of a minister in the church they left when they moved to the Hatley area.

== Geography ==
Hatley is located in northeastern Monroe at 33°58′36″N 88°25′14″W, 4 miles (6 km) east of the center of Amory. According to the U.S. Census Bureau, the town has a total area of 1.4 square miles (3.6 km^{2}), all land. The town sits on a ridge that drains north to Burketts Creek and Turner Branch, and south to Weaver Creek, all of which are tributaries of the Tombigbee River to the west.

== Demographics ==
Historical population
Census	Pop.	Note	%±
1970	385		—
1980	497		29.1%
1990	529		6.4%
2000	476		−10.0%
2010	482		1.3%
2020	495		2.7%
U.S. Decennial Census

As of the 2010 United States census, there were 482 people residing in the town. 99.4% were White, 0.2% Native American, 0.2% Pacific Islander and 0.2% of two or more races.

As of the census of 2000, there were 476 people, 188 households, and 144 families residing in the town. The population density was 354.4 inhabitants per square mile (136.8/km^{2}). There were 202 housing units at an average density of 150.4 per square mile (58.1/km^{2}). The racial makeup of the town was 98.53% White, 1.26% African American and 0.21% Native American.

There were 188 households, out of which 34.0% had children under the age of 18 living with them, 64.4% were married couples living together, 9.6% had a female householder with no husband present, and 23.4% were non-families. 22.3% of all households were made up of individuals, and 9.6% had someone living alone who was 65 years of age or older. The average household size was 2.53 and the average family size was 2.98.

In the town, the population was spread out, with 24.4% under the age of 18, 7.6% from 18 to 24, 27.3% from 25 to 44, 25.4% from 45 to 64, and 15.3% who were 65 years of age or older. The median age was 40 years. For every 100 females, there were 93.5 males. For every 100 females age 18 and over, there were 91.5 males.

The median income for a household in the town was $44,167, and the median income for a family was $51,667. Males had a median income of $32,813 versus $26,875 for females. The per capita income for the town was $17,726. About 8.7% of families and 10.8% of the population were below the poverty line, including 12.2% of those under age 18 and 14.3% of those age 65 or over.

== Education ==
Hatley is served by the Monroe County School District.
