= 2023 Amory tornado =

2023 EF3 tornado in Mississippi, U.S.

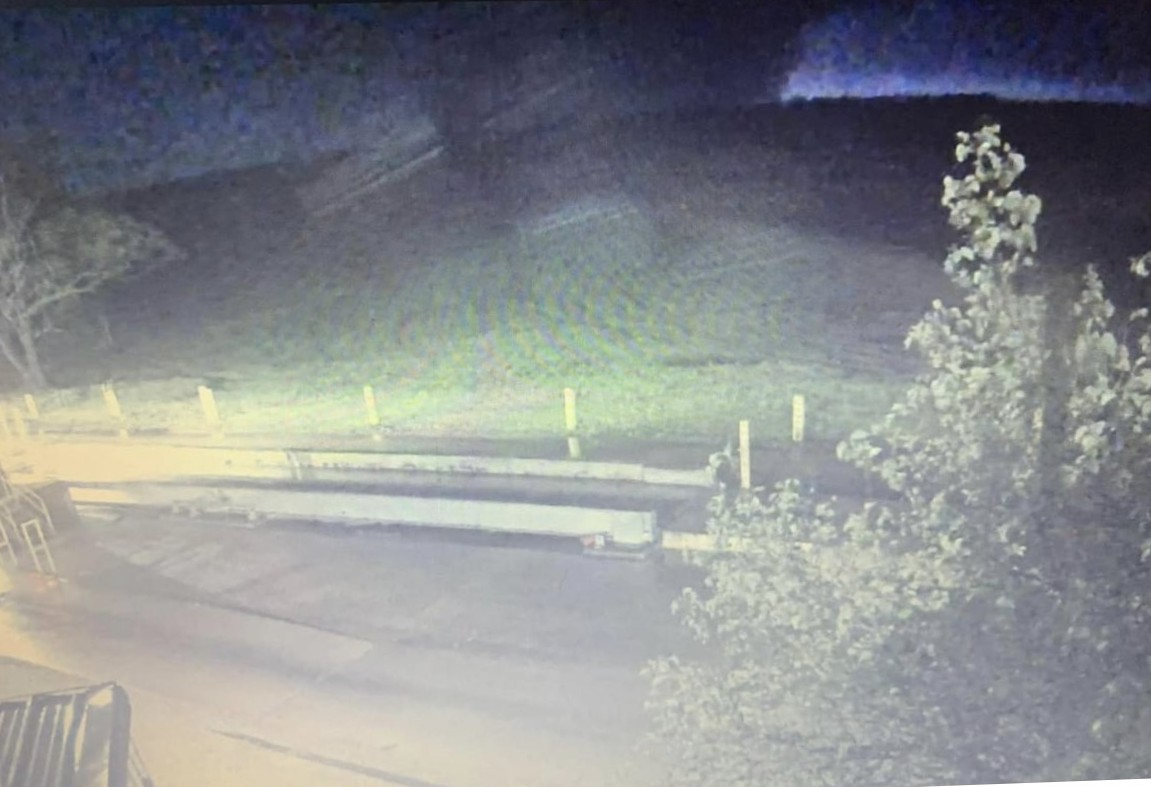
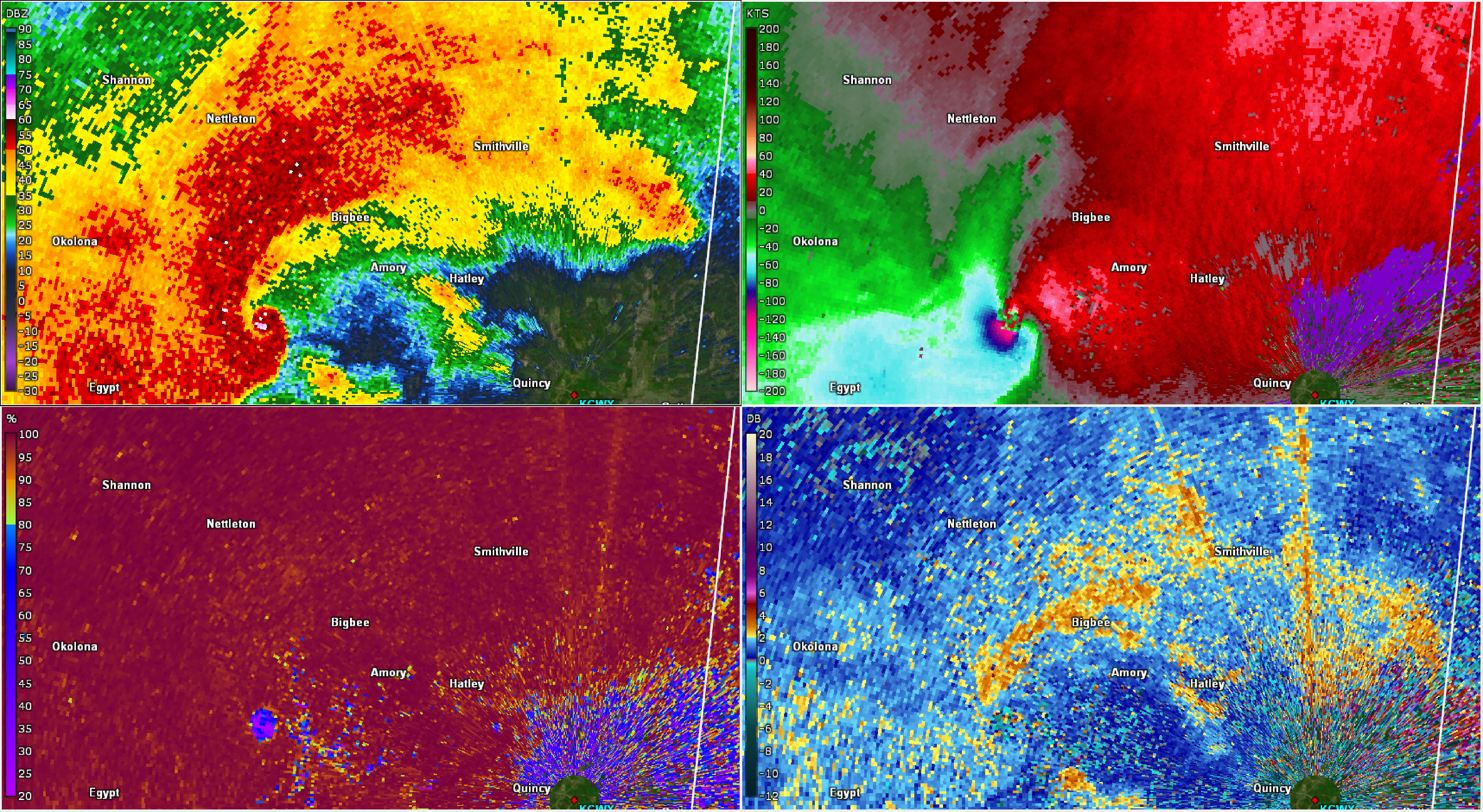
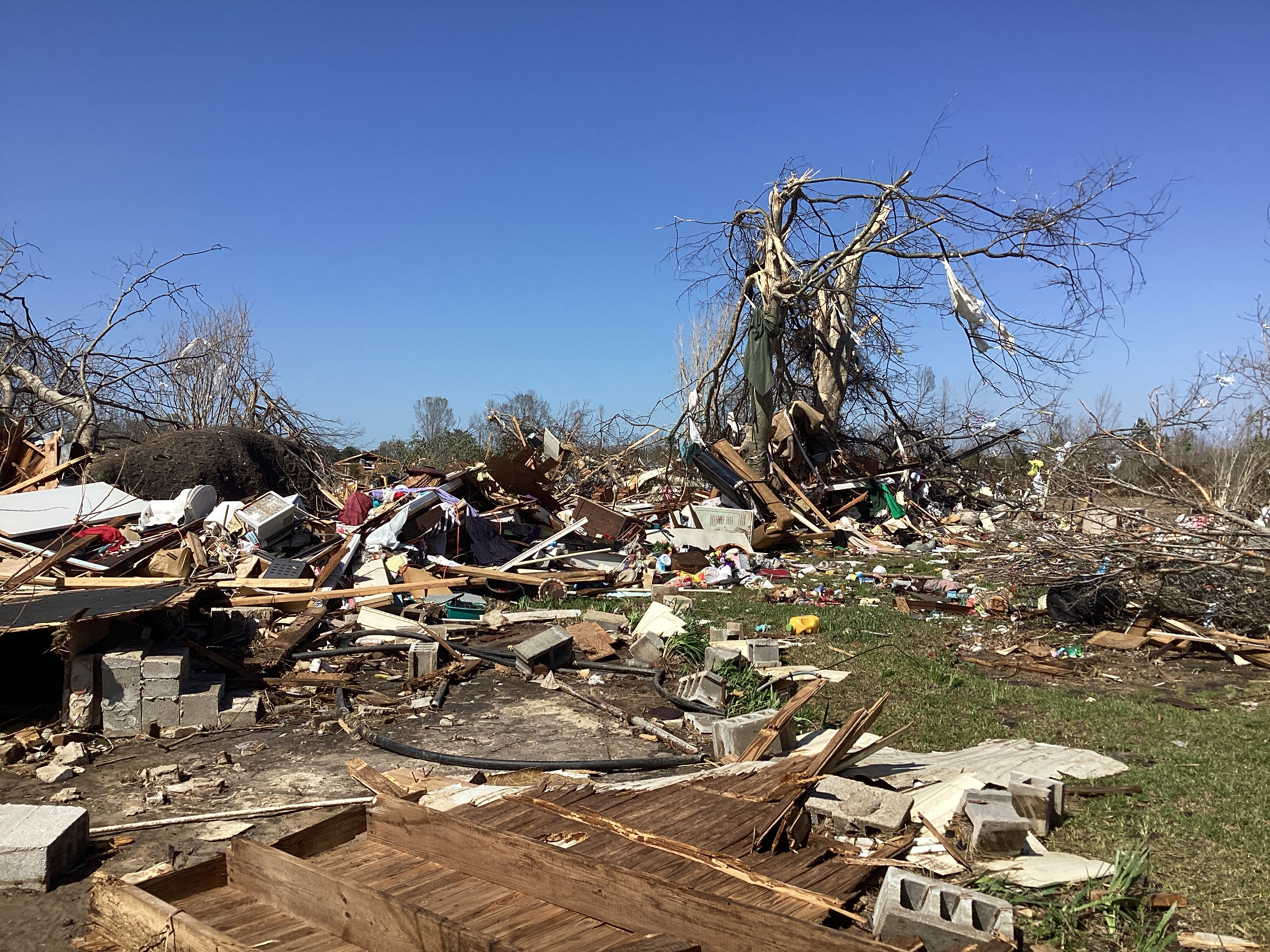
- Clockwise from top: A CCTV still of the tornado as it crossed US 278; Shredded trees and remains of a mobile home that was obliterated at EF3 intensity near New Wren; NEXRAD radar scan of the tornado as it approached Amory.

Meteorological history
- Formed: March 24, 2023, 10:38 p.m. CDT (UTC−05:00)
- Dissipated: March 24, 2023, 11:09 p.m. CDT (UTC−05:00)
- Duration: 31 minutes

EF3 tornado
- on the Enhanced Fujita scale
- Max width: 1,600 yards (0.91 mi; 1.5 km)
- Path length: 36.91 miles (59.40 km)
- Highest winds: 155 mph (249 km/h)

Overall effects
- Fatalities: 2
- Injuries: 55
- Damage: $80.045 million (2023 USD)
- Areas affected: Chickasaw, Monroe, and Itawamba counties; specifically in or around Egypt, New Wren, Tranquil, Amory, Flinn, Smithville, and Turon, Mississippi, United States.
- Part of the Tornado outbreak of March 24–27, 2023 and Tornadoes of 2023

On the night of March 24, 2023, a large, extremely fast-moving, and intense EF3 tornado tracked across Chickasaw, Monroe, and Itawamba Counties in Mississippi, most notably striking the city of Amory. It was one of four EF3+ tornadoes in a large tornado outbreak in late March including the 2023 Rolling Fork tornado. The tornado was on the ground for 31 minutes, traveled 36.91 miles (59.40 km), had an average forward windspeed of 71.4 mph (114.9 km/h), and caused 2 fatalities as well as 55 injuries. The tornado also caused $80.045 million worth of damages.

The tornado was produced by a long-track supercell that had formed that had formed around 7:57 p.m. (Note: For consistency, all times in the article are in Central Daylight Time.) along the Louisiana-Mississippi border and traveled northeast spawning two tornadoes, a high-end EF4 tornado that devastated Rolling Fork, Mississippi and a high-end EF3 tornado that struck near the city of Winona, before entering Chickasaw County. At 10.38 p.m. the tornado would touch down southwest of Egypt immediately causing EF1 damage as it crossed U.S. Route 45, before intensifying to EF2 intensity on Egypt Road. Now at EF3 intensity, the tornado would enter Tranquil and produced EF3 damage. Shortly after this, the tornado passed near New Wren where a tornado emergency would be issued for the community as well as Amory. Now at peak intensity, the tornado would enter Amory. Numerous buildings would be damaged, however no deaths occurred within city limits. After this, the tornado would continue to weaken to EF2 intensity as it approached Flinn and Smithville, producing EF0–EF1 damage before dissipating northeast of Turon at 11:09 p.m.

== Meteorological synopsis ==
=== Setup & forecast ===
On March 18, an upper-level trough was situated across the Western United States. As time progressed, the trough began to progress to the east. By March 20, forecasters at the National Weather Service's Storm Prediction Center were calling attention to "some potential for discrete storms" in Mississippi on March 24 ahead of the cold front, their severity contingent on prior destabilization of the atmosphere. On March 22, the National Weather Service's Storm Prediction Center (SPC) issued a level 3/5 enhanced risk of severe weather across portions of Louisiana, Arkansas, and Mississippi for supercell thunderstorms capable of large hail, damaging winds, and strong tornadoes (EF2+ on the Enhanced Fujita scale). The enhanced risk was expanded northward the following day, and the original outlined area was upgraded to a level 4/5 moderate risk.

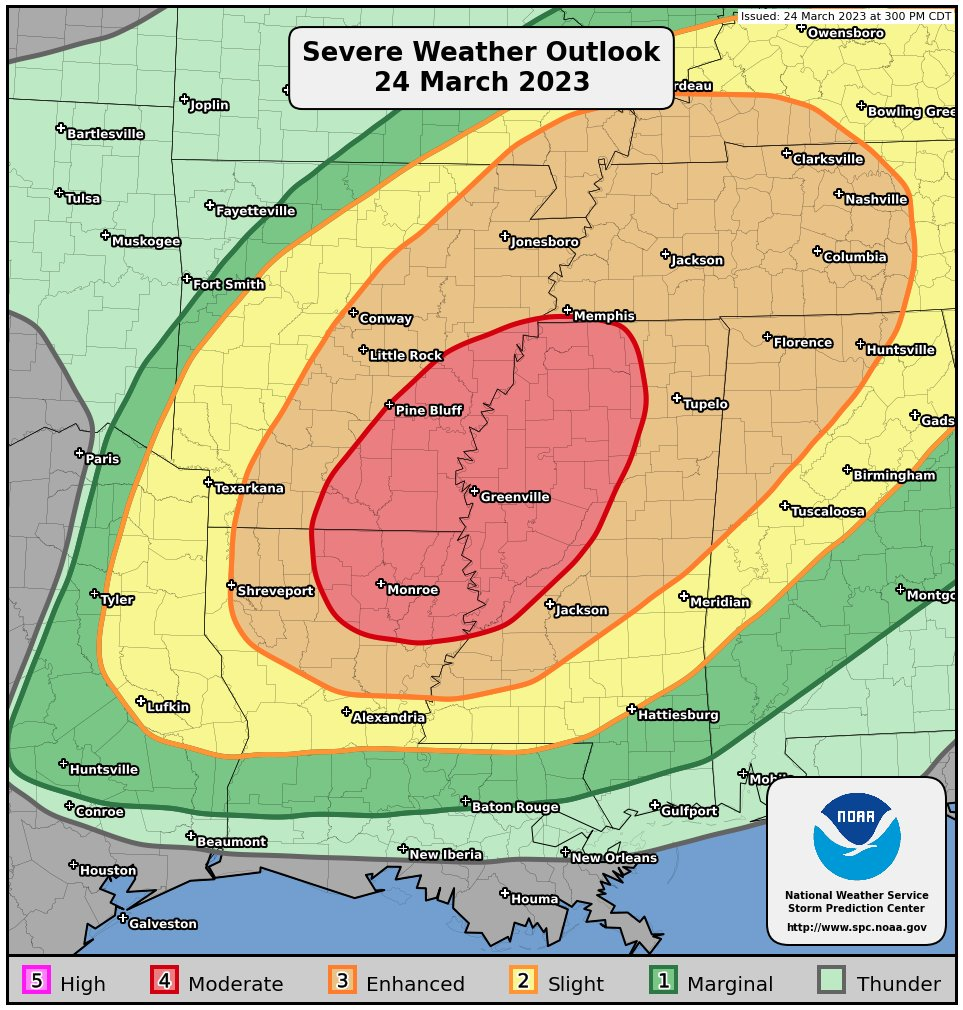
The Storm Prediction Center’s Severe Weather Outlook for March 24, 2023.

On March 24, water vapor imagery showed a potent mid-level trough. Strong mid-level winds between the trough and strong high-pressure area across the Southeastern United States were displaying in models as well. Meanwhile, a quickly deepening low-pressure area was expected to drag a warm front northward, leading to a broad, unstable air mass to its south. Although some reduction in moisture was expected across Mississippi due to drier air aloft and warm surface temperatures into the 80s Fahrenheit, continued advection of moist air from the Gulf of Mexico seemed supportive of dewpoints in the upper 60s and lower 70's across Louisiana, Arkansas, and Mississippi, by the evening hours. Thus, mixed-layer convective available potential energy was expected to rise into the 1,500–2,000 J/kg range. Forecasters initially thought that strong forcing of ascent across Arkansas would lead to an organized squall line capable of both tornadoes and damaging winds, whereas more discrete supercells would be possible farther south, particularly along north–south oriented confluence bands in the open warm sector. The tornado threat relied on the amount of wind shear in the lower levels, which would aid in sustaining supercells.

=== Supercell formation & storm development ===
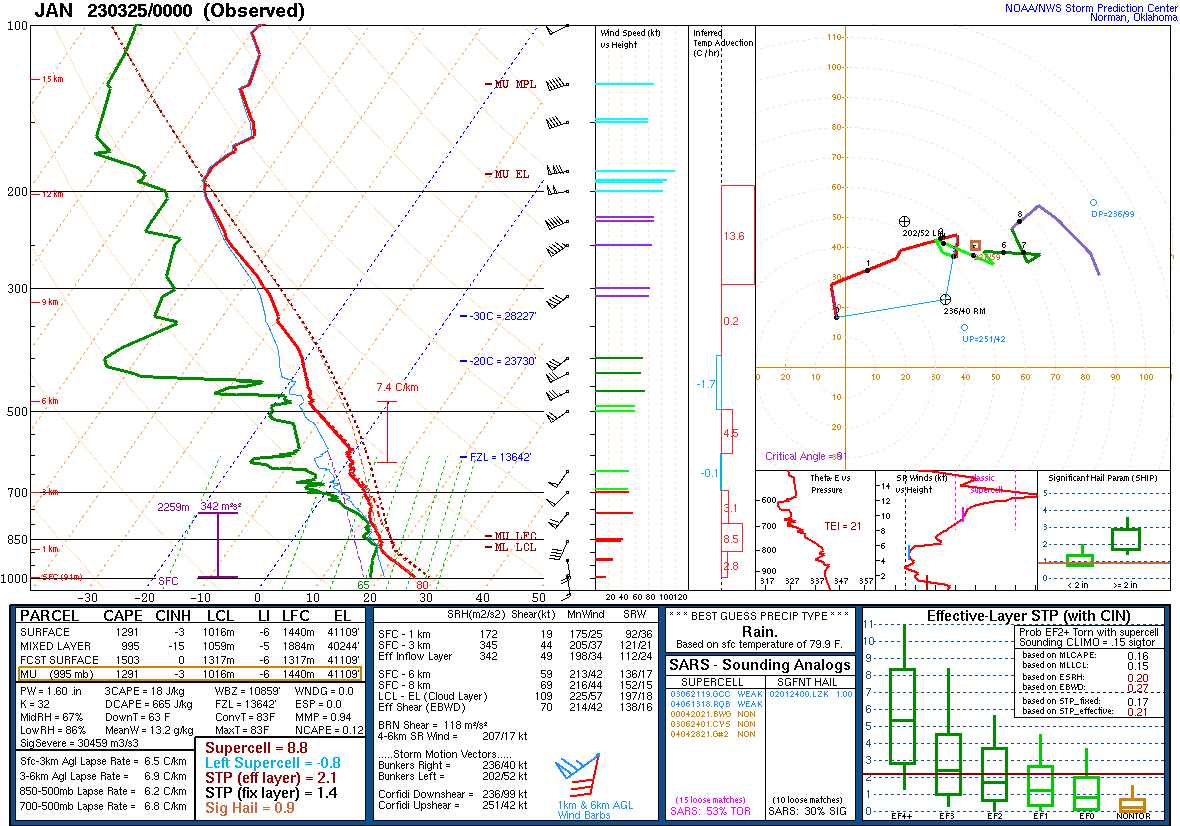
An observed sounding from Jackson, Mississippi, launched less than an hour before the Rolling Fork EF4 began.

A tornado watch was issued at 5:15 p.m. for portions of eastern Arkansas, northeastern Louisiana, central and northern Mississippi, and western Tennessee. The watch mentioned the possibility of several strong to intense tornadoes with persistent supercells. Clusters of storms evolved along the confluence bands in conjunction with improving wind shear profiles. However, given their displacement from the surface low and better forcing, there was some uncertainty as to whether they would become better organized. A strengthening low-level jet and surface moisture increased confidence in the maturation of these cells, but tornadic development had not yet begun in the area as of 00:00 UTC.

At their 01:00 UTC outlook, the SPC lowered the probability of tornadoes to a 10% (significant) tornado area, thus downgrading the moderate risk to an enhanced risk. The SPC cited weaker than expected instability in the area, with increased confidence in only limited buoyancy developing. However, the same update noted that "a couple of longer-track supercells" and "a few strong tornadoes" remained possible.

As the update was being issued, a strong supercell evolved near the Louisiana-Mississippi border. By 7:57 p.m., a strong velocity couplet formed at the base of the supercell, which then produced what would become a long-tracked, violent EF4 tornado, and at 8:04 p.m., as the storm approached the town of Rolling Fork, a tornado emergency was placed. This tornado would be rated EF4 with maximum winds estimated at 195 mph (314 km/h). After the Rolling Fork tornado had dissipated, the supercell would continue northeast, soon being embedded within a line segment of storms. Despite this, the supercell continued tornadic activity, producing a high-end EF3 tornado near Winona. After this, the supercell continued east as it soon reached the Chickasaw-Monroe County line.

== Tornado summary ==
=== Formation near Egypt and New Wren ===
At 10:38 p.m., the tornado touched down south of County Road 173, quickly moving west and uprooting several trees at EF0–EF1 intensity. The tornado then impacted a row of homes on County Road 179, where several trees were uprooted nearby at EF1 intensity. The tornado continued towards U.S. Route 45A buckling road signs and snapping large tree branches. The tornado began to intensify east of Egypt when two outbuildings were completely destroyed at high-end EF2 intensity, furthermore tree trunks were snapped at mid-range EF2 intensity. On Egypt Road, the tornado weakened slightly, however high-end EF1 damage was inflicted to multiple homes that lost roof shingles. The tornado re-intensified along White Rock Road were homes lost their roof shingles at EF1 intensity, and power poles were damaged at EF2 intensity. Furthermore, EF2 tree damage continued to occur. The tornado continued to race east, where a mobile home would be completely destroyed at mid-range EF2 intensity along Herndon Lane, injuring several members of the Herndon family and killing two, which were the only fatalities attributed to the tornado. Additional EF2 damage also occurred to another home. Tree trunks were also snapped before the tornado continued northeast.

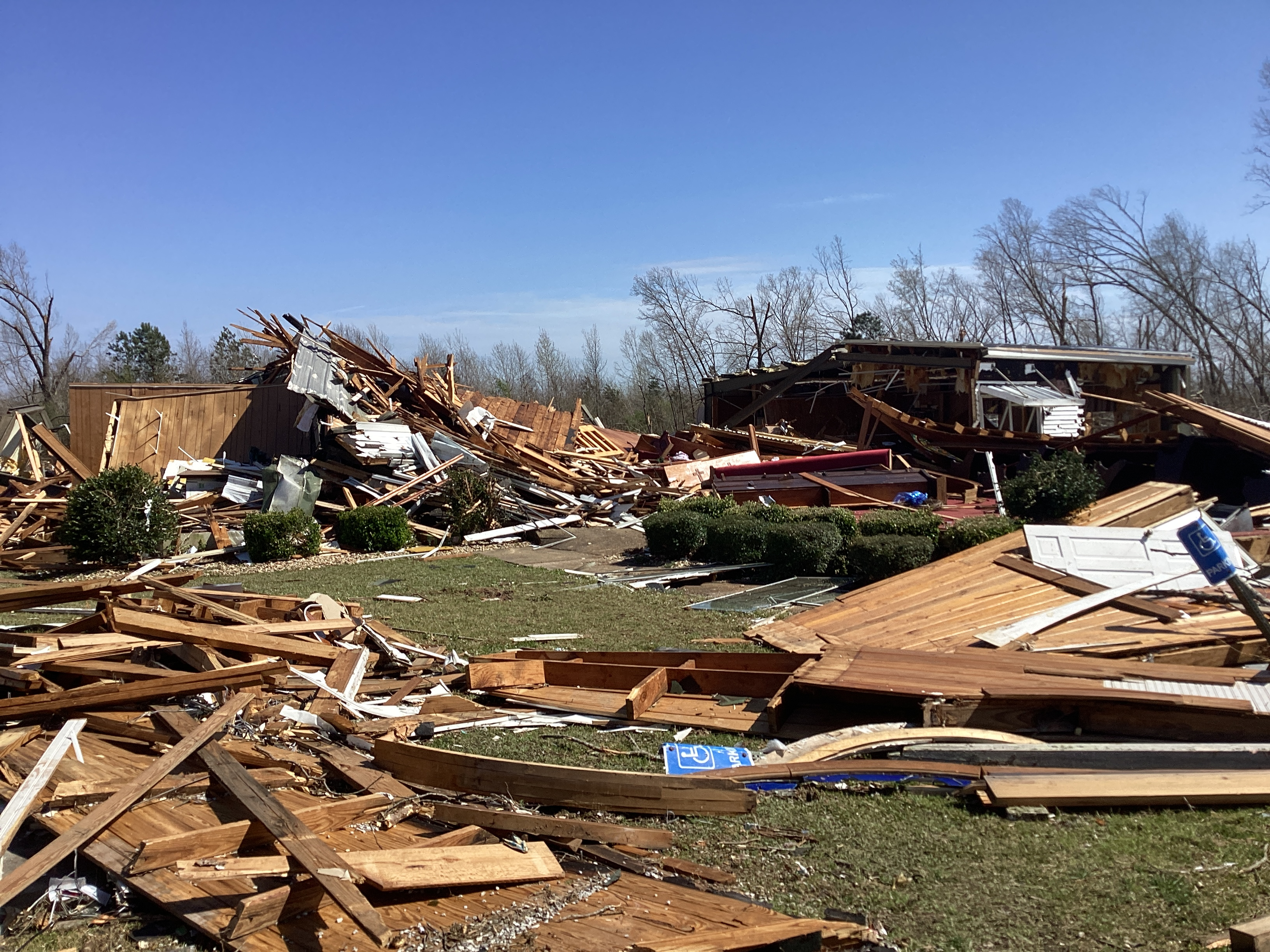
A home that had all of its exterior walls collapse at EF3 intensity east of Tranquil.

The tornado soon impacted a row of homes along McAllister Road, removing the roofs of a manufactured home at high-end EF1 intensity, before completely destroying four mobile homes at high-end EF2 intensity, as well as removing portions of roofs from other homes. The tornado then entered Tranquil, continuing to intensify further when along Whatley Road, a mobile home was destroyed, tree trunks were snapped, and portions of roofs were removed off of homes at low-mid range EF2 intensity. At this location, the tornado also reached low-end EF3 intensity where a home had most of its outer wall's collapse. Along Little Coontail Road, another row of homes was impacted as wooden poles and trees were snapped at low-end EF2 intensity, before a mobile home was completely destroyed at EF3 intensity and causing the walls of two homes to collapse at EF3 intensity. After this, the tornado weakened slightly to EF2 intensity as it continued towards Lake Monroe near New Wren.

=== Peak intensity in Amory ===
Around this time, a tornado emergency would be issued for New Wren and Amory. Along Coontail Road, multiple trees would be uprooted at EF2 intensity as the tornado continued eastward. More trees would be uprooted at EF2 intensity along Cotton Ginn Road as the tornado entered Amory. Along Mississippi Highway 278 West, wooden power poles and trees would be snapped at EF2 intensity. As the tornado entered downtown, more power poles and trees would be snapped along I and H Avenue. Along F Avenue, the Saint James Methodist Church was directly hit, losing significant portions of its roofing at EF2 intensity. Along D Avenue, a row of mobile homes was impacted, two of which were completely destroyed, and another two were severely damaged at high-end EF2 intensity. Along Wren Street and May Avenue, a mobile home would be completely destroyed at EF2 intensity, multiple other buildings in the area sustained damage, including the West Amory Church of Christ, which suffered its entire roof collapsing at EF2 intensity. Along A Avenue, 2 more buildings would be damaged at EF2 intensity before the tornado intensified.

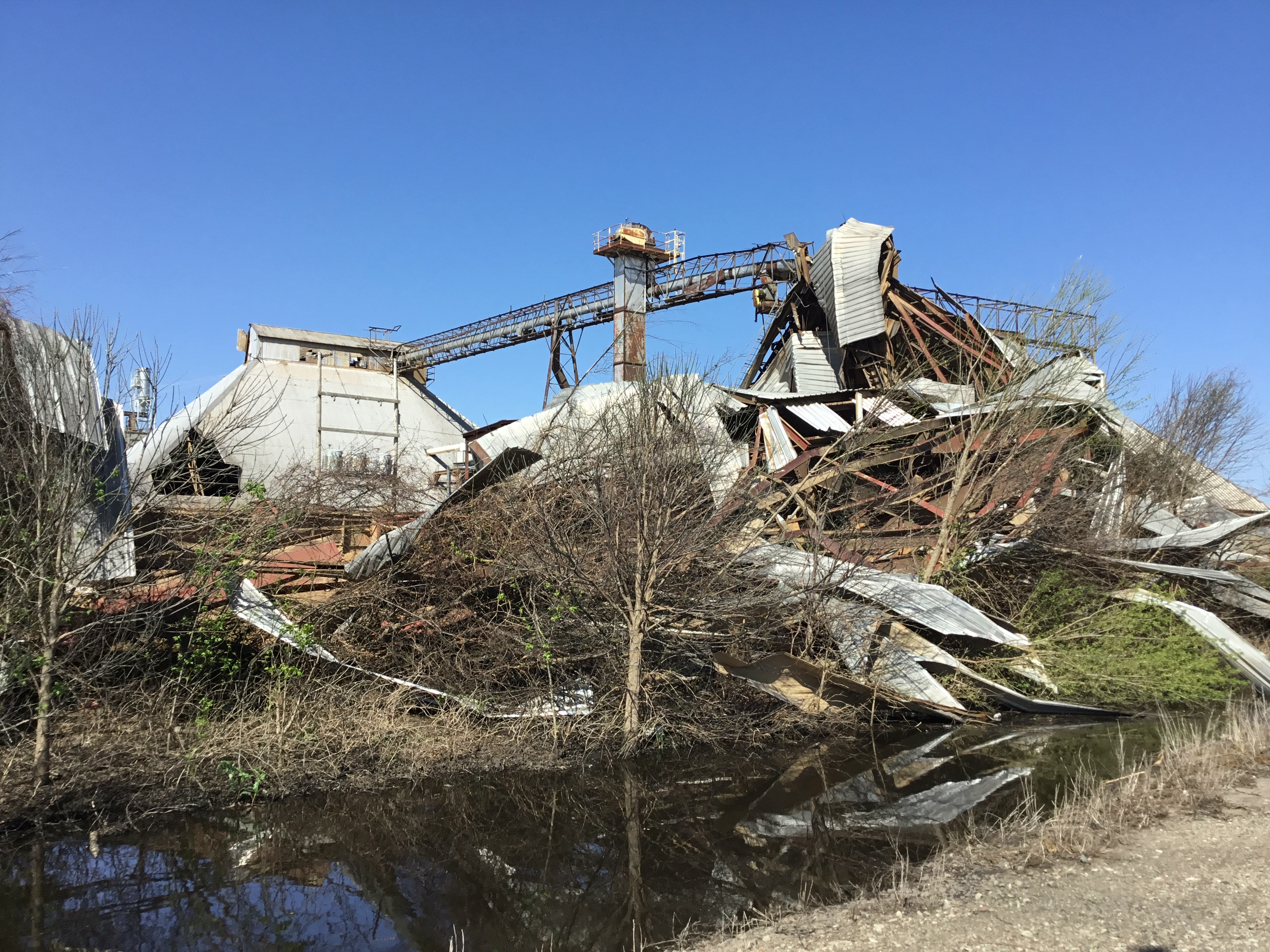
A warehouse that was destroyed at EF3 intensity in Amory.

Now at peak intensity, the tornado impacted a row of two buildings along 110th Street North, one of which had its X-bracing resisting system destroyed at low-end EF3 intensity, and the other was completely destroyed at mid-range EF3 intensity, with maximum winds estimated at the location to be around 155 mph (249 km/h). A cell tower at this location also collapsed at low-end EF3 intensity. The tornado continued at peak intensity along Martin Luther King Boulevard, where a large warehouse was severely damaged at EF3 intensity. Another warehouse at the same location was also completely destroyed. Along 104th Street North, a third building would be destroyed at EF3 intensity. Along Waterway Drive, a vehicle was hurled 60 yards off of the road at EF2 intensity, another home also saw most of its exterior walls collapse at EF3 intensity here. Along Drill Street, a metal building had its roof buckle at EF2 intensity. A strip mall nearby also saw its roof collapse at EF2 intensity. The tornado's last point of EF3 intensity occurred along 10th Avenue North, where a metal building saw its frames collapse at low-end EF3 intensity. A fast-food restaurant also had its roof collapse at EF2 intensity.

The tornado weakened as it crossed Cowden Drive, however a strip mall would still suffer its entire roof collapsing at EF2 intensity. Scattered points of EF0–EF1 damage also occurred on multiple streets within the city, mostly notably when a mobile home was lifted off of its foundation at high-end EF1 intensity along 10th Avenue North. The tornado re-intensified as it impacted the Mississippi National Guard building in Amory, as wooden power poles would be snapped at EF2 intensity, the buildings entire roof would also be lifted, as windows were also blown out, both at EF2 intensity. At this same time, the tornado impacted the Amory High School, where the athletics facility suffered severe damage, with the roof also being destroyed at high-end EF2 intensity. Trees were also snapped along a golf course at EF2 intensity. Low-end EF2 damage also occurred to trees along Robert Hill Road, a home would also suffer most of its roof collapsing at EF2 intensity, before the tornado left city limits and weakened.

==== 'Dear, Jesus, please help them' ====
See also: List of notable media in the field of meteorology

'Dear, Jesus, please help them'
- Video restricted due to copyright
- View video

During live coverage of WTVA News, the tornado would rapidly continue to intensify at mid-range EF3 intensity. This would be noticed by WTVA Chief Meteorologist Matt Laubhan who noticed a large tornado debris signature on radar. Realizing the tornado was heading into downtown Amory, he would begin to pray on live television. He would state "Dear Jesus, please help them. Amen." just seconds before the tornado entered city limits. Laubhan would later state during multiple news interviews, such as those from CNN, that his prayer was not deliberately intended and that he was overwhelmed.

=== Flinn to Turon and dissipation ===
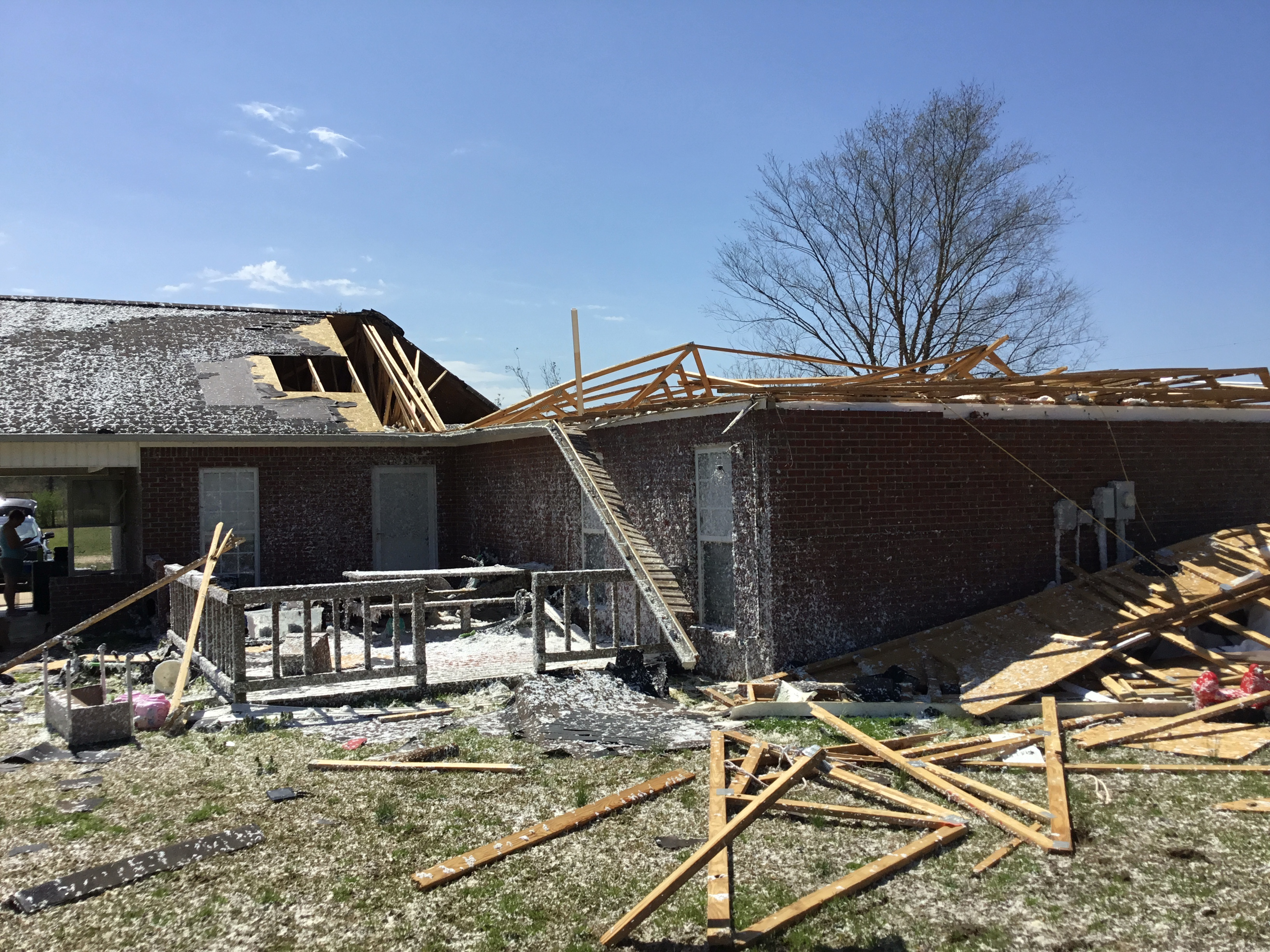
A home that lost significant portions of its roof at EF2 intensity south of Flinn.

After leaving Amory, the tornado briefly weakened to EF1 intensity, uprooting trees along Philips Schoolhouse Road. The tornado then quickly re-intensified, uprooting trees along Myatt Road at low-end EF2 intensity. The tornado shortly after then crossed Elliot Road, snapping tree branches at high-end EF1 intensity and uplifting a roof off of a building at EF2 intensity. The tornado continued to uproot trees at EF0–EF1 intensity in rural areas near Smithville Road south of Flinn. Now south of Smithville, the tornado re-intensified again along Williams Young Road, uprooting multiple trees and destroying a garage at EF1 intensity, and removing portions of a home's roof at EF2 intensity. Along Parham Store Road, the tornado destroyed an outbuilding at low-end EF2 intensity before weakening once again. Along Seminole Road, the tornado damaged several outbuildings at EF1 intensity. Near the county line, the tornado continued to uproot multiple trees while gradually weakening at low-end EF1 intensity before leaving Chickasaw County. Now in Itawamba County, the tornado continued to snap numerous trees at EF0–EF1 intensity on State Line Road. The tornado then dissipated just after crossing Wilson Road at 11:09 p.m. northeast of Turon, after being on the ground for 31 minutes.

=== Short summary ===
The tornado was on the ground for 31 minutes, peaking at mid-range EF3 intensity, with peak wind speeds estimated at 155 mph (249 km/h). Two fatalities and 55 injuries were confirmed. The length of the tornado's path was 36.91 miles (59.40 km) with a peak width of 1,600 yards (1,500 m). It had an average forward windspeed of 71.4 mph (114.9 km/h) and caused $80.045 million worth of damage (2023 USD).

== Aftermath ==
=== Damage ===
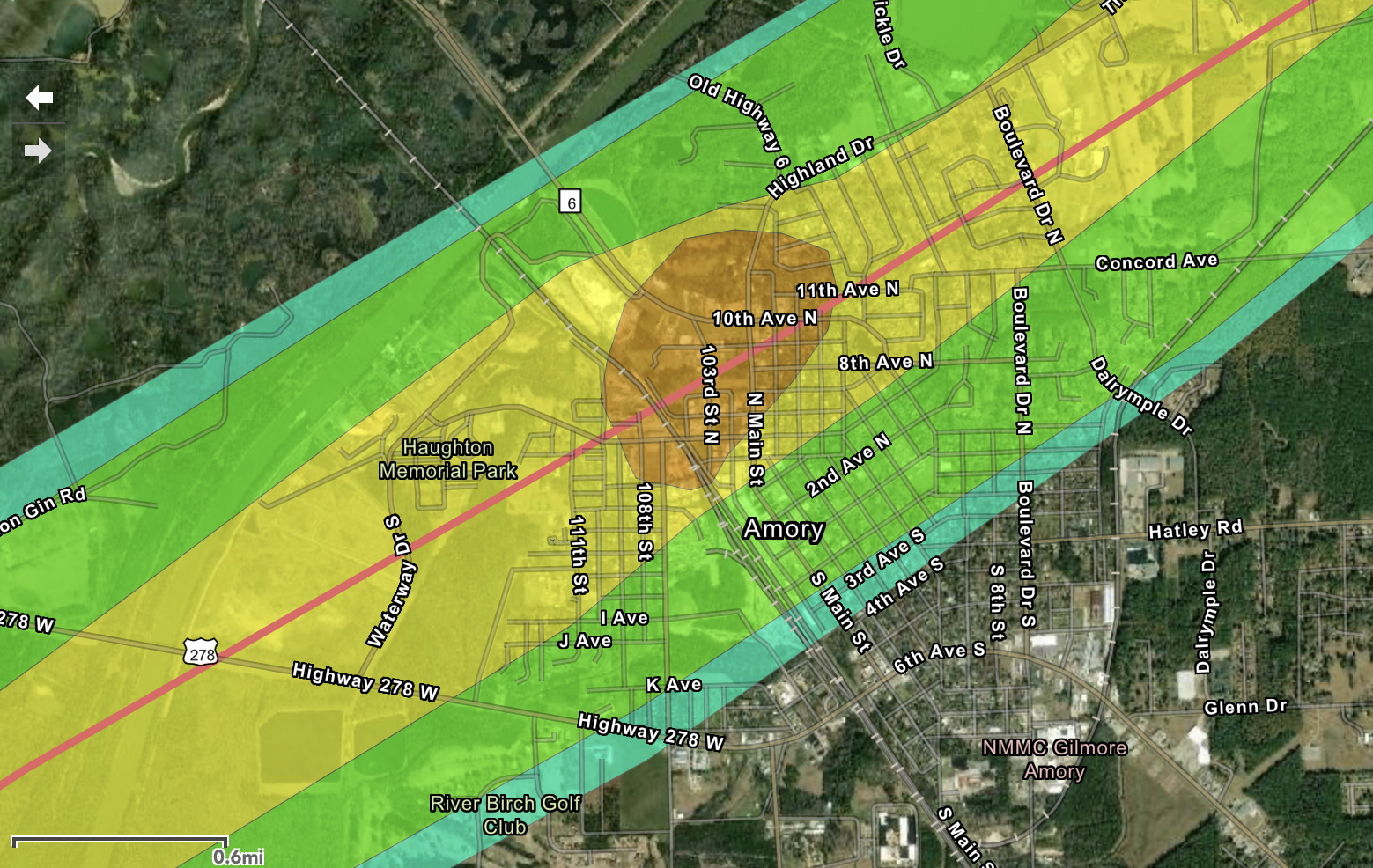
Track and intensity map of the tornado at peak intensity in Amory. Key EF0 65–85 mph EF1 86–110 mph EF2 111–135 mph EF3 136–165 mph

Along its track, the tornado had damaged or destroyed around 1,500 homes across its lifespan, affecting roughly 26 families in the process, including multiple that had either had lost portions of or all of their walls between EF2–EF3 intensity. The tornado's first area of severe damage occurred shortly after formation, east of Egypt where 2 mobile homes were destroyed and trees were snapped at EF2 intensity. Along Herndon Lane southwest of New Wren, a home would suffer near-total roof loss, another mobile home would also be completely destroyed, resulting in three injuries and two fatalities among the Herndon family. Both would be rated at high-end EF2 intensity. On Mcallister Road, a row of six mobile homes was also destroyed. Entering Tranquil, the tornado would damage trees and uproot multiple homes at EF2 intensity, four homes also suffered collapsed outer walls at low-end EF3 intensity. Now within Amory, the tornado would continue to inflict major damage, destroying or damaging dozens of homes at EF2 intensity, and destroying seven at EF3 intensity. The worst of which being rated mid-range EF3 with winds of 155 mph (249 km/h). Major damage to the Amory High School and a Mississippi National Guard Armory was also noted. After leaving city limits, the tornado continued to produce EF2 damage multiple times up until Flinn. The tornado continued to produce EF0–EF1 damage until its dissipation near Turon.

In total, the tornado inflicted severe damage across Chickasaw, Monroe, and Itawamba Counties, inflicting $80.045 million worth of damage.

=== Recovery efforts ===
==== Immediate aftermath and initial efforts ====
A tractor cleaning up debris the day after the tornado.

In the hours following the tornado, search and rescue operations began, with first responders and individuals rescuing several individuals from trapped homes and buildings. Despite this, no fatalities were confirmed within city limits, although two fatalities were confirmed near New Wren, 55 injures would also be confirmed over the tornado's lifespan. The Mississippi Emergency Management Agency (MEMA) initially listed as 25 deceased state-wide, although this number would soon be revised to 21. That same day, Mississippi Task Force 1, a specialized team of firefighters, were sent by the Oxford and Lafayette County fire departments to assist in the recovery for Rolling Fork and Amory. The team remained in Amory for upwards of 24 hours, providing critical aid and grid searches. Due to the extensive amount of debris and structural damage, a temporary curfew would be established in Amory between 8:00 p.m. to 6:00 a.m. on March 25. Residents were also encouraged to boil their water due to extensive damage to the city's water department. Debris removal continued well into April as the MEMA continued to encourage recovery efforts. MEMA also stated that recovery would be a long process and take months, however, would continue providing emergency shelter to displaced residents.

==== Rebuilding the Amory School District ====
Basketball players going through the rubble of the Amory High School athletics wing.

The Amory High School suffered extreme damage from the tornado, mainly in its athletics facility. The roof of the building was torn off, windows were shattered, and other damage was observed. Because of these developments, the school would temporarily close all classes for the remainder of March and into early April. Students and staff were also temporarily relocated to four different modular units until schools reopened. As Amory continued its recovery, the school would eventually announce its reopening on April 11, 2023. Although buses were noted to be unavailable at the time. In November 2023, the Federal Emergency Management Agency (FEMA) would approve a $1.5 million loan for refurbishment expenses for Amory School District and the high school. As of February 2024, the district would release a report on current recovery efforts. It noted that all fencing and canopies at the elementary and middle schools were completed, and that the Gym and Band reroof project had reached 90% completion. Other areas such as the soccer field were also playable. The main high school roof replacement was set to be completed in July 2024.

==== Volunteer efforts and long-term recovery ====
The Salvation Army aiding in recovery efforts after the tornado.

The Salvation Army would be one of the first groups to respond to the tornado. By March 25, teams were mobilized to affected areas across northern Mississippi to distribute meals, snacks, and water to survivors and those affected. Over 1,400 shelf-stable meals and palates of water were distrusted to community centers. Other items such as ice, snacks, and other items were distributed. In March 2024, in partnership with other volunteer groups such as the Monroe Strong Long Term Recovery Committee and Love Without Walls enacted widespread distribution of mattresses amongst affected people. The American Red Cross also initiated major efforts, mainly offering food at sites in cooperation with MEMA. Other groups such as Eight Days of Hope acted on their own, launching an 8-day campaign between March 9–16, 2024, serving 122 families ranging from painting to rebuilding homes, with the help of 1,700 volunteers. In May 2025 mayor of Amory Corey Glenn stated that a new action plan was necessary for recovery. The Mississippi Development Authority stated it was still looking for recovery funds to rebuild cities such as Amory from tornadoes.

=== Political response ===
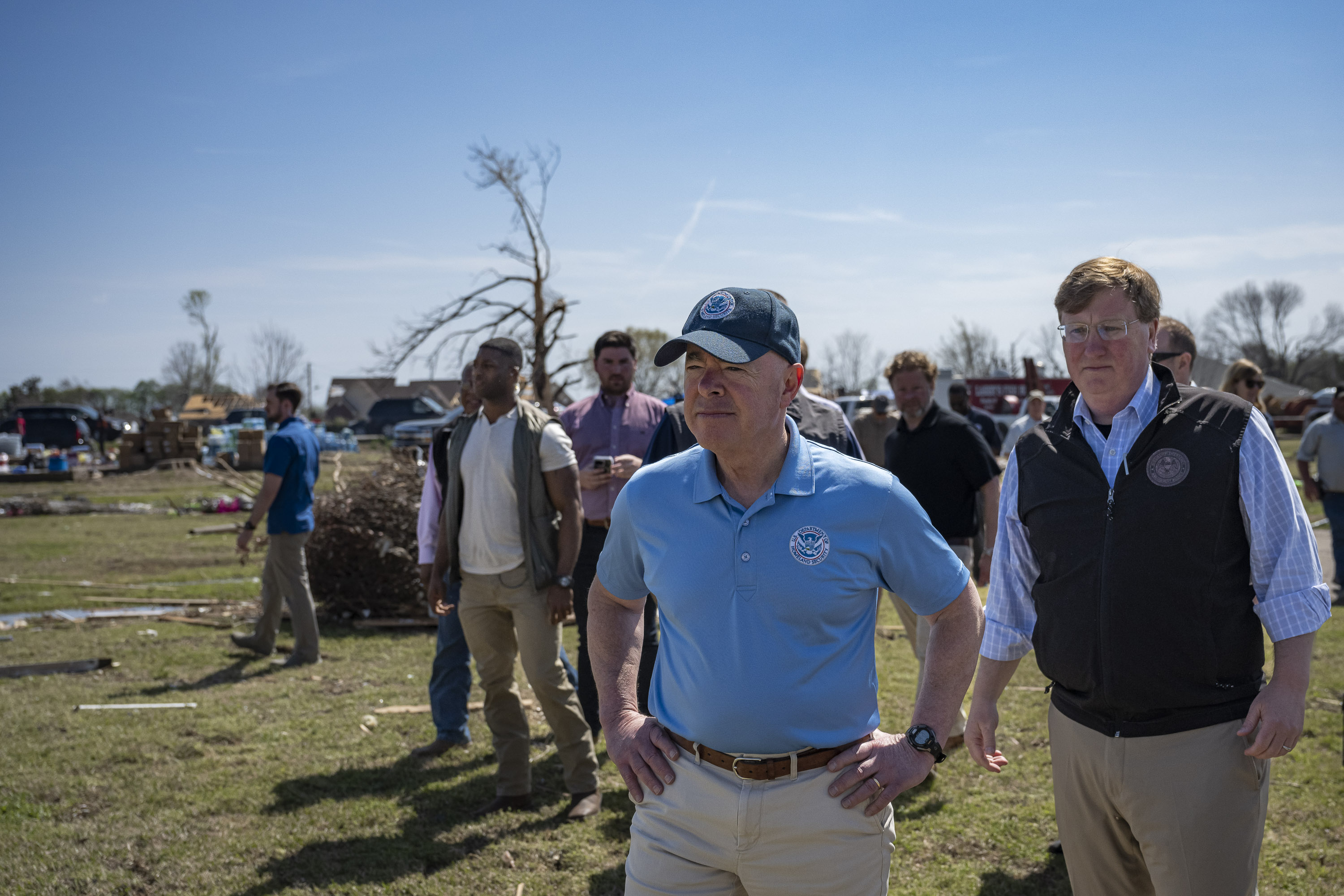
Secretary Alejandro Mayorkas and Governor Reeves touring the damage in Rolling Fork on March 26.

After the Rolling Fork tornado and the other tornadoes of the corresponding tornado outbreak, state and national politicians responded to the devastation in Mississippi. On March 25, Governor of Mississippi Tate Reeves declared a state of emergency in Sharkey, Humphreys, Carrol, and Monroe Counties. Governor Reeves's request for a major disaster declaration was granted by President Joe Biden on March 26. President Biden visited Rolling Fork on March 31 and announced that the federal government would fully cover the cost of the cleanup for the storms on March 24. The Mississippi state legislature also later approved approximately $18.5 million in tornado relief funds for affected areas in Mississippi.

On April 26, 2023, Senior Senator Roger Wicker, along with 8 other senators would introduce a new bill known as the Tornado Observation Research Notification and Deployment to Operations Act (abbreviated as the TORNADO Act) would be introduced by the United States Senate during the 118th United States Congress. This would be after a large tornado outbreak in late March, as well as another tornado outbreak from late March to early April. The provisions of the TORNADO Act mandated that the National Oceanic and Atmospheric Administration (NOAA) implement a high-resolution tornado forecasting program to increase warning lead times, establish a dedicated Risk Communication Office to simplify hazardous weather alerts, and formally evaluate potential updates to the Enhanced Fujita scale. The bill would be introduced during the 119th United States Congress.

=== Casualties ===
In total, two fatalities would occur from the tornado, both members of the Herndon family located on Herndon Lane.

List of tornado victims
Name	Age	Location
Ethan Herndon	33	New Wren area
Riley Herndon	1	New Wren area

== See also ==
- Tornado outbreak of March 24–27, 2023
- List of F3, EF3, and IF3 tornadoes (2020–present)
- Tornadoes of 2023
- 2023 Rolling Fork tornado - A fatal EF4 tornado that formed from the same supercell that day.
- 2023 Black Hawk–Winona tornado - Another fatal EF3 tornado that formed from the same supercell.
- 2011 Smithville tornado - An extremely violent EF5 tornado that occurred in Smithville 12 years prior.
- List of meteorological photos and videos
