= Amory =

Amory may refer to:

== Places ==
- Amory, Mississippi
  - Amory Lock
  - Amory School District
- Amory-Ticknor House, Boston
- Amory Hall (Boston)
- Vance W. Amory International Airport, island of Nevis

== Other uses ==
- Amory Adventure Award, a Canadian Venturer award
- The Amory Wars, a science fiction comic book series

== See also ==
- Amory (name)
