= 2023 Black Hawk–Winona tornado =

2023 EF3 tornado in Mississippi, US

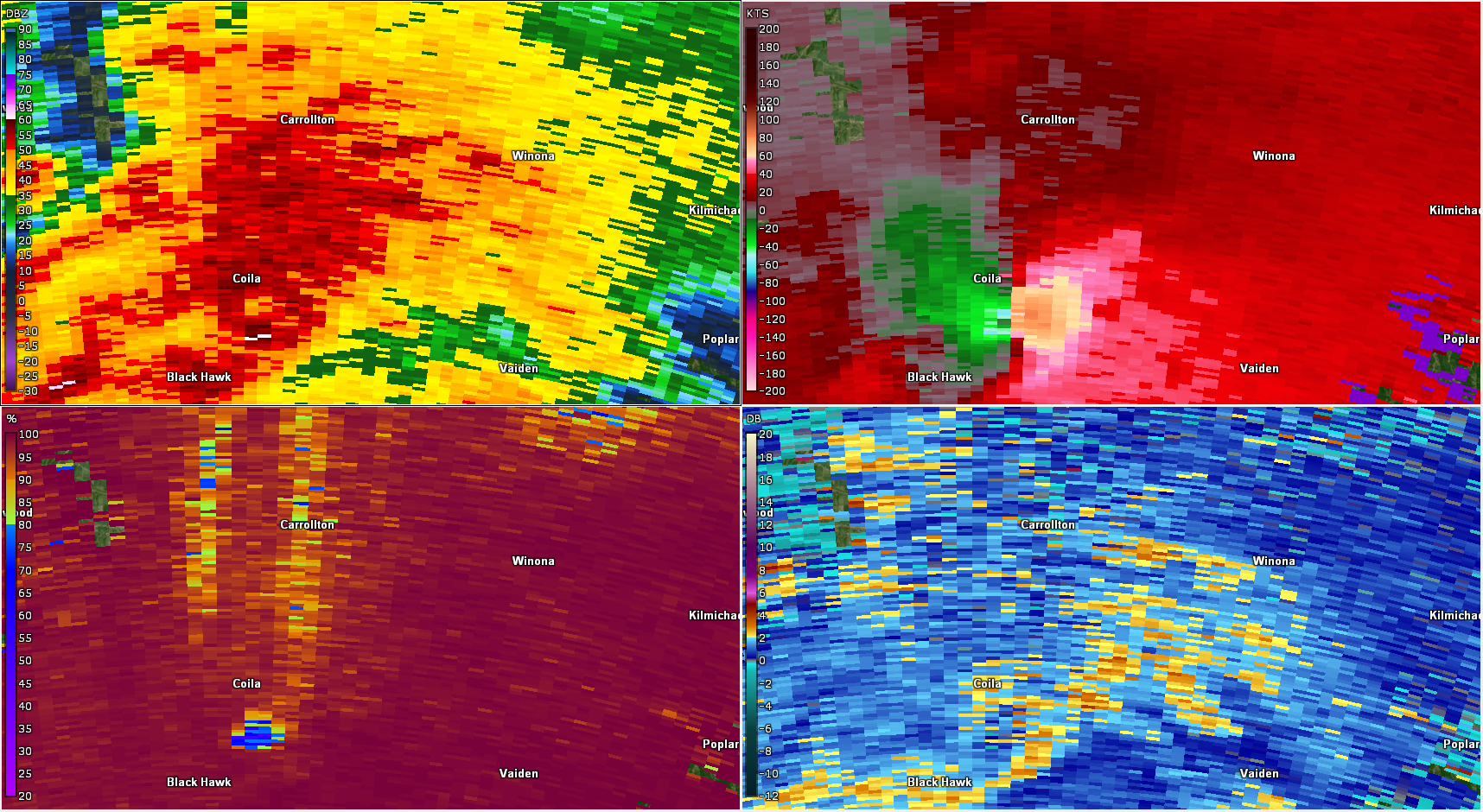
- Winona, MS EF3 on radar

Meteorological history
- Formed: March 24, 2023, 9:12 p.m. CDT (UTC−05:00)
- Dissipated: March 24, 2023, 9:37 p.m. CDT (UTC−05:00)
- Duration: 25 minutes

EF3 tornado
- on the Enhanced Fujita scale
- Max width: 1,250 yards (0.71 mi; 1.14 km)
- Path length: 29.2 miles (47.0 km)
- Highest winds: 165 mph (266 km/h)

Overall effects
- Fatalities: 3
- Injuries: 5
- Areas affected: Carroll County (Black Hawk), Montgomery County (Winona, United States)
- Houses destroyed: ~70
- Part of the Tornado outbreak of March 24–27, 2023 and Tornadoes of 2023

In the evening hours of March 24, 2023, a large, long-tracked high end EF3 tornado severely impacted the Mississippi communities of Black Hawk and Winona by causing severe structural and vegetation damage. It killed 3 people and injured 5 others, destroying and damaging over 70 houses in Carroll County and neighborhoods in Winona and Black Hawk. The tornado was part of a wider severe weather outbreak impacting most of the southeast. While an isolated financial cost was not calculated for the Black Hawk-Winona tornado, the parent tornado outbreak inflicted an estimated $1.9 billion in total economic damage across the region. The tornado touched down at 9:12 p.m. CDT on March 24, 2023, in a rural area of eastern Carroll County, approximately 11 miles east of Cruger. Moving rapidly northeastward at speeds exceeding 70 mph, the storm intensified almost immediately into a large wedge tornado. It reached peak high-end EF3 intensity with estimated winds of 155 mph as it tore directly through the unincorporated community of Black Hawk, causing three fatalities. Maintaining its strength and an expansive path width of up to 1,250 yards, the tornado then crossed the county line into Montgomery County, tracking toward the city limits of Winona. The tornado tracked 29.2 miles and was on the ground for 25 minutes.

== Meteorological synopsis ==
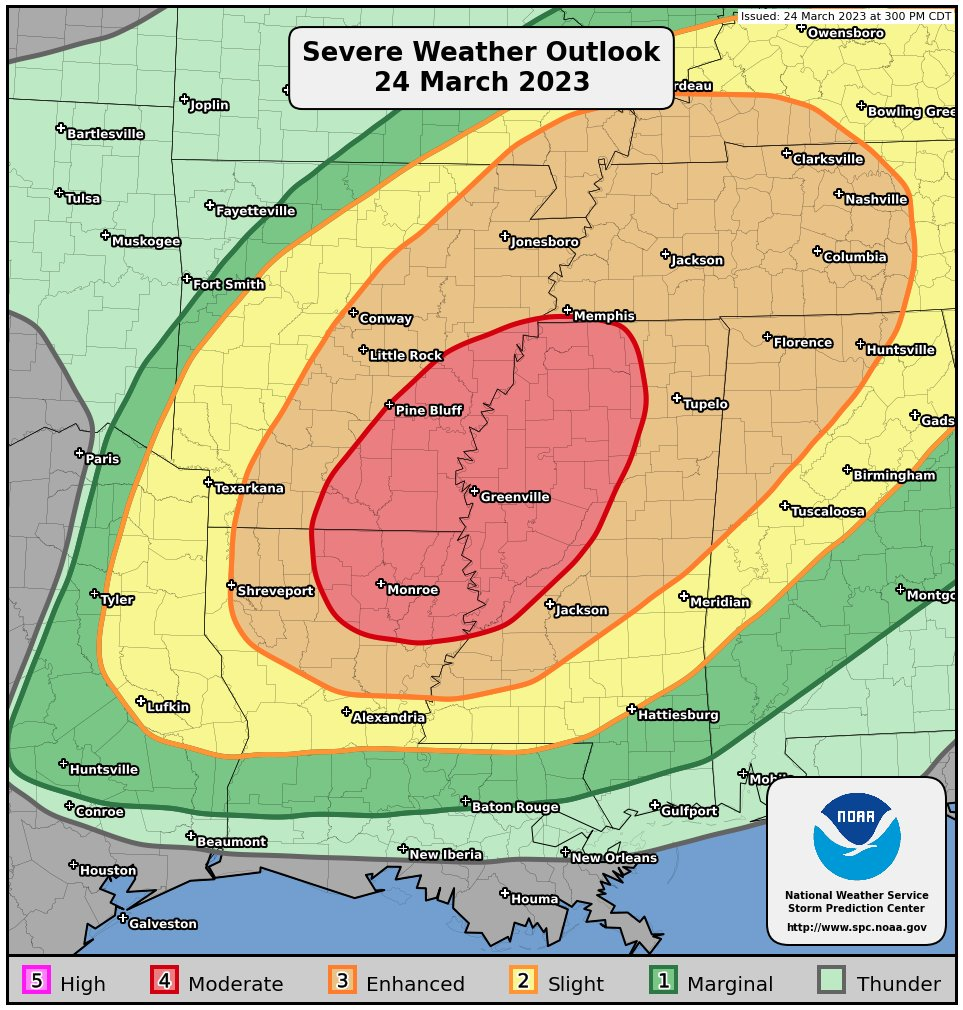
The Storm Prediction Center’s Severe Weather Outlook for March 24, 2023

On March 18, an upper-level trough was situated across the Western United States. As time progressed, the trough began to progress to the east. By March 20, forecasters at the National Weather Service's Storm Prediction Center were calling attention to "some potential for discrete storms" in Mississippi on March 24 ahead of the cold front, their severity contingent on prior destabilization of the atmosphere.

On March 22, the National Weather Service's Storm Prediction Center (SPC) issued a level 3/enhanced risk of severe weather across portions of Louisiana, Arkansas, and Mississippi for supercell thunderstorms capable of large hail, damaging winds, and strong tornadoes (EF2+ on the Enhanced Fujita scale). The enhanced risk was expanded northward the following day, and the original outlined area was upgraded to a level 4/moderate risk.

On the morning of March 24, satellite water vapor imagery revealed a potent mid-level trough digging across the region, positioned against a strong high-pressure area anchored over the Southeastern United States. This tight atmospheric setup generated intense mid-level winds, while an accelerating low-pressure area pulled a warm front northward, introducing a broad and highly volatile air mass to its south. Despite some mid-level dry air keeping overall atmospheric moisture slightly lower than initially forecasted, temperatures soaring into the 80s Fahrenheit combined with steady moisture advection from the Gulf of Mexico. This environment pushed dewpoints into the upper 60s and lower 70s across Louisiana, Arkansas, and Mississippi by the evening hours, elevating mixed-layer convective available potential energy (CAPE) values into the volatile 1,500–2,000 J/kg range. While meteorologists anticipated that strong atmospheric forcing would spark an organized squall line in Arkansas, they noted that the open warm sector farther south remained highly supportive of discrete supercell thunderstorms. Driven by intense low-level wind shear that was primed to sustain long-tracked rotation, these individual supercells ultimately tracked into western and central Mississippi.

== Tornado summary ==
=== Supercell history ===
The supercell that produced the tornado started off as a cluster of storms in northeast Louisiana. The cluster remained mostly disorganized until it approached the Mississippi River, where a more favorable low level jet allowed the cluster to organize into a powerful supercell, developing a mesocyclone in Caldwell Parish. The supercell soon crossed into Issaquena County, Mississippi and produced a long-tracked and deadly EF4 tornado that devastated the communities of Rolling Fork, Midnight, and Silver City. The tornado would dissipate in Holmes County at 9:08 p.m. CDT. Just four minutes later, the supercell would produce the Black Hawk-Winona tornado.

=== Formation ===
The tornado touched down at 9:12 p.m. CDT on March 24, 2023, in a rural, heavily forested area of eastern Carroll County, approximately 11 miles east of Cruger. Moving rapidly northeastward at forward speeds exceeding 70 mph (110 km/h), the tornado intensified almost immediately into a wedge tornado. Trees branches were snapped, multiple hardwood trees would be uprooted and damage to rural mobile homes at EF0 and EF1 intensity.

=== Black Hawk and peak intensity ===
- Damage survey track of the tornado Key EF0 65–85 mph (105–137 km/h); EF1 86–110 mph (138–177 km/h); EF2 111–135 mph (179–217 km/h); EF3 136–165 mph (219–266 km/h)

The tornado would rapidly intensify at high-end EF3 intensity as it moved through the community of Black Hawk and surrounding areas, where peak winds were estimated at 155 mph (249 km/h) to 165 mph (266 km/h). The core of the tornado caused catastrophic structural damage to the center of the community, completely destroying the Black Hawk School and the nearby Black Hawk Independent Church, both of which were century-old community buildings. Both structures suffered total collapse of their unreinforced masonry exterior brick walls, leaving only parts of the concrete floor slabs intact, while the church steeple was completely severed and its heavy metal bell thrown a considerable distance from the site. The adjacent parsonage, a single-family wood-frame home, was completely leveled.

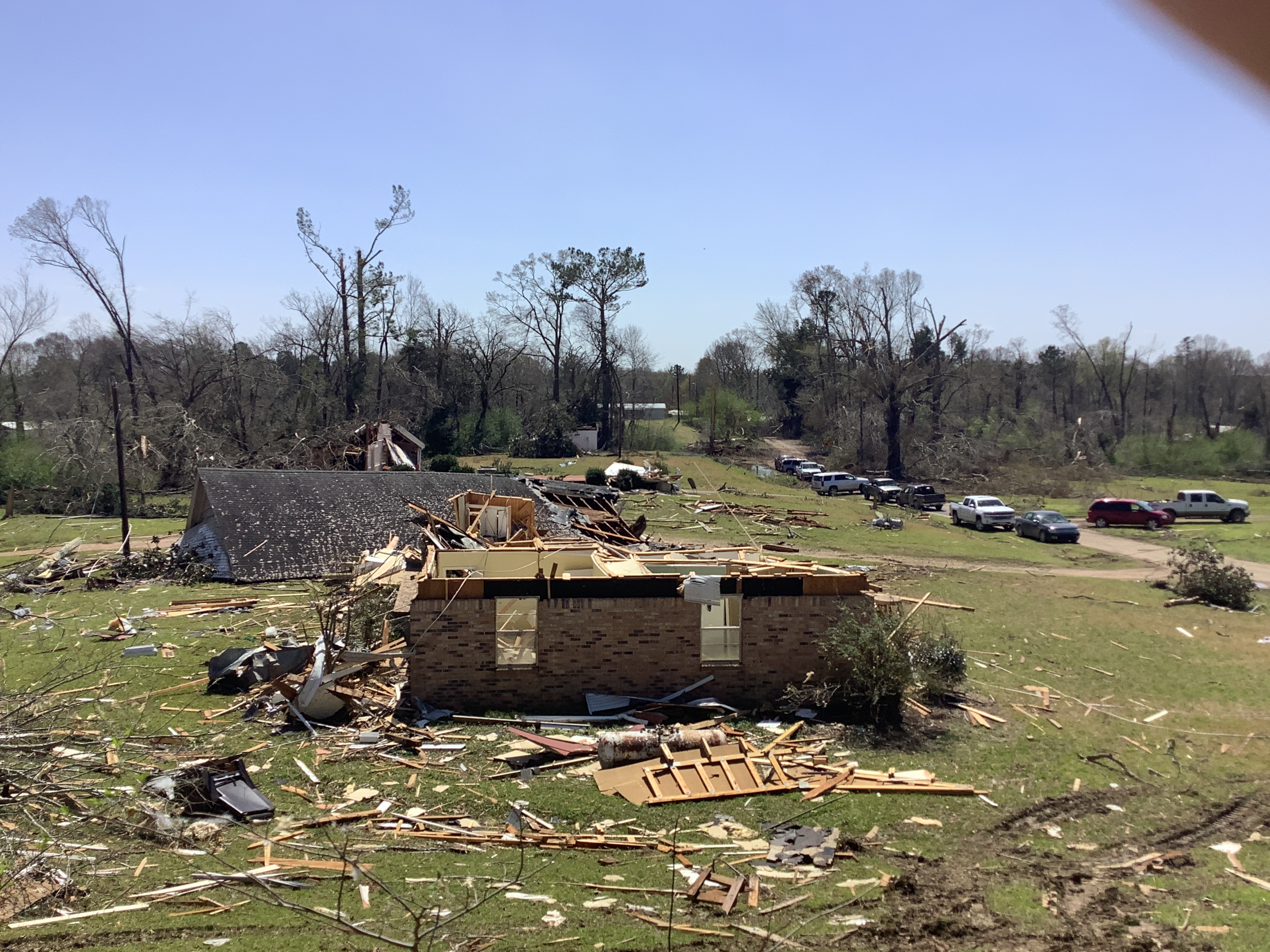
EF3 damage to a parsonage and trees in Black Hawk, Mississippi.

Several conventional residential structures were severely impacted throughout Black Hawk. A brick-veneer single-family frame house sustained total structural failure with all exterior walls collapsing inward, while an adjacent wood-frame residence had its entire roof structure torn off and multiple load-bearing walls knocked down, exhibiting mid-range to high-end EF3 damage. The tornado inflicted three fatalities within the Black Hawk community; the victims were identified as Danny Munford, Helen Munford, and JaDarrion Murphy. All three casualties occurred when multiple manufactured homes were completely flattened, torn from their steel undercarriages, and scattered across adjacent fields at EF3 intensity. Heavy agricultural machinery, industrial transport vehicles, and a substantial steel grain storage cart were thrown from properties into nearby fields, while several center-pivot irrigation systems were rolled over, and heavily daamged. Dozens of wooden utility poles were snapped off cleanly near the ground line. In the surrounding forested areas, Hardwood trees were damaged with hundreds of large oaks being completely flattened.

=== Winona ===
Maintaining a maximum path width of 1,250 yards (1,140 m), The tornado moved through city limits at EF3 intensity. The tornado crossed the county boundary into Montgomery County, retaining its peak intensity as it tracked directly toward the southern and eastern city limits of Winona. The tornado intersected major regional transit corridors, crossing U.S. Route 82 and Interstate 55, leaving a continuous swath of intense ground scouring and structural failures along its path.

As the tornado entered the southern and eastern periphery of the city, the primary damage path widened across several residential subdivisions, where peak wind speeds were estimated up to 150 mph (241 km/h). Dozens of single-family, wood-frame homes sustained severe structural compromises. Documented engineering failures within these neighborhoods included the total loss of roof structures, the failure of structural gable ends, and the complete collapse of load-bearing exterior walls. In areas subjected to high-end wind loading, residential structures shifted laterally off their concrete foundations, causing the clean fracturing of sill plate anchor connections and exposing the underlying floor framing structures. Within the broader municipality, approximately 70 residential structures were categorized by survey teams as heavily damaged or entirely destroyed.

The most significant infrastructural impact occurred along U.S. Highway 51, where the core of the tornado made a direct hit on the primary Entergy Mississippi electrical substation powering the municipality. Extreme pressure gradients and aerodynamic loading caused the total collapse of 40-foot (12 m) structural steel transmission towers, fractured five high-voltage transmission structures and snapped approximately 40 wooden distribution poles cleanly near the ground-line. The catastrophic failure of core power transformers and peripheral control hardware severed the regional transmission path to local distribution networks, interrupting service to around 15,400 customers and completely disabling the city's utility grid. Adjacent commercial corridors sustained significant secondary impacts from high-velocity airborne debris with light-gauge metal cladding panels and fractured timber structural members penetrating the exterior walls of neighboring retail businesses and warehouses.

Ecological damage throughout the Montgomery County sector was severe, leaving a distinct scar of vegetation loss signature visible by satellite imagery. Contiguous stands of old-growth hardwood and softwood timber were completely flattened, uprooted, or defoliated. The accumulation of tangled timber and downed utility lines completely obstructed primary roads, which restricted initial emergency vehicle access and temporarily isolated residents within damaged structures. While no fatalities occurred within the Winona sector, emergency medical personnel documented five injuries requiring hospitalization.

=== Dissipation ===
After passing east of the Winona city limits, the tornado began to gradually weaken as it tracked through rural, forested portions of eastern Montgomery County toward the community of Kilmichael. Damage along this final segment dropped to EF0 and EF1 intensity, consisting primarily of snapped tree limbs, uprooted trees in open fields, and minor cosmetic damage to agricultural outbuildings and shingles. The tornado officially dissipated at 9:37 p.m. CDT north of Randall Road, just before reaching the Choctaw County line.

The tornado tracked 29.2 miles (47.0 km) and was on the ground continuously for 25 minutes. The damage cost for the tornado however is unknown but the parent supercell caused $1.9 billion USD in damages. Following this storm's dissipation, the parent supercell remained highly organized as it cycled over northeastern Mississippi, where it went on to produce a third intense tornado, the Amory tornado later that night.

== Aftermath ==
=== Recovery efforts ===
The tornado inflicted severe damage on critical local infrastructure, completely disrupting the regional electrical grid. In Winona, the tornado made a direct hit on an Entergy Mississippi electrical substation located along Highway 51. The storm completely collapsed 40-foot steel transmission towers, destroyed heavy transformers, snapped roughly 40 distribution poles, and downed five major transmission structures, leaving the city entirely cut off from the main power grid. To bypass a lengthy traditional reconstruction process, Entergy deployed an advanced mobile substation—a fully functional engineering grid built onto a specialized trailer network—to the site. A workforce of approximately 50 trained utility professionals managed the mobile substation installation inside the site, while an additional 60 to 70 crew members worked outside the station to replace downed distribution lines and poles. Through this deployment, utility crews successfully rerouted power and restored electricity to all Winona customers capable of safely receiving power within a few days of the strike. Corporate utility providers and philanthropic entities also contributed to long-term financial aid; Entergy committed $100,000 to the American Red Cross for regional storm relief, alongside an additional $50,000 corporate match for employee donations.

Immediate grassroots recovery efforts mobilized across Carroll and Montgomery counties to assist displaced residents who had lost their homes. The Mississippi Emergency Management Agency (MEMA) coordinated with local officials to establish designated disaster recovery resource centers and point of distribution sites. Local volunteer networks and residents immediately organized an unofficial grassroots relief hub at the local K&M Grocery storefront in Black Hawk, which community members nicknamed "Loaves and Fishes." The site expanded into an extensive tent operation providing non-perishable food, water, ice, cleanup tools, and baby supplies, with volunteers utilizing all-terrain vehicle caravans to deliver ice and provisions to residents trapped behind roads blocked by downed trees.

National humanitarian organizations rapidly deployed to the region to reinforce local aid operations. The Salvation Army mobilized disaster units directly into Winona and Black Hawk within 24 hours of the storm, setting up mobile stations to distribute hot meals, water, and snacks to storm survivors and first responders, while also providing over 1,400 shelf-stable meals and pallets of water to community supply centers. Simultaneously, the American Red Cross established a primary recovery assistance site in the education building of the Moore United Methodist Church in Winona. Disaster relief teams at the church utilized mobile wireless infrastructure to run internet hot spots and set up phone charging stations for residents navigating the prolonged power outages, enabling Red Cross caseworkers to process emergency relief funds directly to impacted families. The Mississippi Baptist Disaster Relief organization also deployed teams to Winona, setting up operational command centers to coordinate volunteer chainsaw crews, debris removal operations, and crisis counseling services. In Winona, local residents and neighborhood groups quickly began sorting through damaged properties and clearing wreckage to assist displaced neighbors as long-term reconstruction efforts commenced.

=== Political response ===
Following the disaster, Montgomery and Carroll counties were included in a federal major disaster declaration issued by President Joe Biden, which authorized Individual Assistance grants from the Federal Emergency Management Agency (FEMA) to aid displaced residents.

The brief 20-minute warning lead times provided to Mississippi residents during the Tornado outbreak of March 24–27, 2023 became a primary catalyst for federal legislative action. On April 26, 2023, U.S. Senator Roger Wicker (R-MS), alongside a bipartisan coalition of colleagues in the 118th United States Congress, introduced the Tornado Observation Research Notification and Deployment to Operations (TORNADO) Act. Driven directly by the devastation in communities like Rolling Fork, Black Hawk, and Winona, the legislation was designed to improve the National Weather Service's alert systems. The legislation drew broad, cross-regional support from lawmakers representing other storm-impacted states, including U.S. Senator Raphael Warnock (D-GA), who co-sponsored the bill to address the federal government's capacity to predict and communicate extreme weather events to vulnerable southern communities. The provisions of the TORNADO Act mandated that the National Oceanic and Atmospheric Administration (NOAA) implement a high-resolution tornado forecasting program to increase warning lead times, establish a dedicated Risk Communication Office to simplify hazardous weather alerts, and formally evaluate potential updates to the aging Enhanced Fujita scale (EF scale).
