= Hob Bryan =

American politician

Member of the Mississippi State Senate from the 7th district
- Incumbent
- Assumed office January 3, 1984
- Preceded by: John Johnson

Personal details
- Born: Wendell Hobdy Bryan II; December 5, 1952 (age 73) Amory, Mississippi, U.S.
- Party: Democratic
- Education: Mississippi State University (BA); University of Virginia (JD)

Wendell Hobdy "Hob" Bryan II (born December 5, 1952) is an American politician who has been a member of the Mississippi State Senate from the 7th District since 1984. A Democrat, he is the longest serving member in the upper chamber.

== Early life and education ==
Bryan was born in Amory, Mississippi, on December 5, 1952. He graduated from Mississippi State University and is a graduate of the University of Virginia Law School.

== Career ==
Bryan works as an attorney in Amory.

A Democrat, Bryan ran for office in 1983 to the Mississippi State Senate for the 7th district to replace Senator John Johnson, who decided not to run for reelection. He won in a primary runoff against former state representative Joe Maxcy. He later faced off against Republican pharmacist Van East, winning a majority of the vote. He has been reelected consistently since then.

He represents Itawamba, Lee, and Monroe counties. He chairs the Public Health and Welfare committee. He is currently the longest serving member in the Mississippi State Senate.

He was the primary author for the school funding formula in the Mississippi Adequate Education Program that was implemented in 1997.

== Personal life ==
Bryan is a member of the Amory Rotary Club and is of Baptist faith.
