= Flinn, Mississippi =

- Unincorporated community
- Location within Mississippi Location within the United States
- Coordinates: 34°02′46″N 88°25′45″W
- Country: United States
- State: Mississippi
- County: Monroe
- Elevation: 246 ft (75 m)
- Time zone: UTC-6 (Central (CST))
  - Summer (DST): UTC-5 (CDT)
- Area code: 662
- GNIS feature ID: 711137

Flinn is an unincorporated community in Monroe County, Mississippi. Flinn is located northeast of Amory and southwest of Smithville on Mississippi Highway 25.
