= Ulysses Hollimon =

American baseball player (1931–2023)

- Pitcher
- Born: June 23, 1931; Amory, Mississippi, U.S.
- Died: June 26, 2023 (aged 92)
- Batted: Right Threw: Right

Teams
- Birmingham Black Barons; Baltimore Elite Giants

Ulysses "Slim" Hollimon (June 23, 1931 – June 26, 2023) was an American professional baseball pitcher who played in the Negro American League in a nine-season span from 1948 through 1956. Born in Amory, Mississippi, he batted and threw right handed.

Hollimon played for several teams during his time in the league, most prominently with the Birmingham Black Barons and the Baltimore Elite Giants. Besides, he pitched in the East–West All-Star Game held at Comiskey Park in 1951, where he hit a double.

Afterwards, Hollimon attended Tennessee A&I College and was employed by the Ford Motor Company for 33 years. In addition, he coached Little League Baseball for many years in Plattsburg, Missouri, where he settled.

Prior to the 2008 MLB draft, the Kansas City Royals selected Hollimon as a pitcher in the special draft of the surviving Negro league players. Baseball Hall of Fame player Dave Winfield conceived the idea to have this draft, which allowed the MLB teams each select a former NLB player to rectify and recognize those ballplayers who did not have the opportunity to play in the major leagues on the basis of race.

Hollimon died on June 26, 2023, three days after his 92nd birthday.
