= John Johnson (Mississippi politician) =

American politician

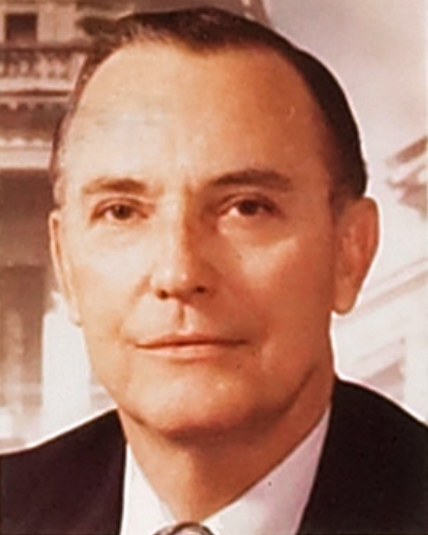
- Official portrait, 1980

Member of the Mississippi State Senate from the 7th district
- In office January 8, 1980 – January 3, 1984
- Preceded by: Leon Wilson
- Succeeded by: Hob Bryan

Member of the Mississippi House of Representatives from the 4A district
- In office January 6, 1976 – January 8, 1980
- Preceded by: Margaret Allen
- Succeeded by: Dorlos Robinson

Personal details
- Born: John Emrow Johnson; August 24, 1920 Wren, Mississippi, U.S.
- Died: February 19, 2002 (aged 81) Amory, Mississippi, U.S.
- Party: Democratic
- Spouse: Julia Allred (m. 1949)
- Education: Mississippi State College; Jackson School of Law
- Occupation: Lawyer; politician

Military service
- Branch/service: United States Army; Army Air Forces; United States Air Force; Air Force Reserve
- Rank: Lieutenant colonel
- Battles/wars: World War II; Asia–Pacific theater

John Emrow Johnson (August 24, 1920 – February 19, 2002) was an American lawyer who served in the Mississippi House of Representatives and Mississippi State Senate.
