= Turon, Mississippi =

- Unincorporated community
- Location within Mississippi Location within the United States
- Coordinates: 34°06′15″N 88°19′30″W
- Country: United States
- State: Mississippi
- County: Itawamba
- Elevation: 381 ft (116 m)
- Time zone: UTC-6 (Central (CST))
  - Summer (DST): UTC-5 (CDT)
- Area code: 662
- GNIS feature ID: 678985

Turon, also known as Prospect, is an unincorporated community in Itawamba County, Mississippi, United States, located on Mississippi Highway 23 northeast of Smithville. A post office operated under the name Turon from 1897 to 1902.
