= Tranquil, Mississippi =

- Unincorporated community
- Location within Mississippi Location within the United States
- Coordinates: 33°56′32″N 88°35′58″W
- Country: United States
- State: Mississippi
- County: Monroe
- Elevation: 279 ft (85 m)
- Time zone: UTC-6 (Central (CST))
  - Summer (DST): UTC-5 (CDT)
- Area code: 662
- GNIS feature ID: 709400

Tranquil is an unincorporated community in Monroe County, Mississippi, United States.

Tranquil is located north of Aberdeen on U.S. Route 45.

== History ==
Tranquil is named for the Tranquil Methodist Church, which was in turn named for a church in Newberry District, South Carolina. The church was originally built in 1847 and destroyed by a tornado in 1915. It was again destroyed by a tornado in 1922, rebuilt, and destroyed by another tornado on March 24, 2023.
