= Amory Lock =

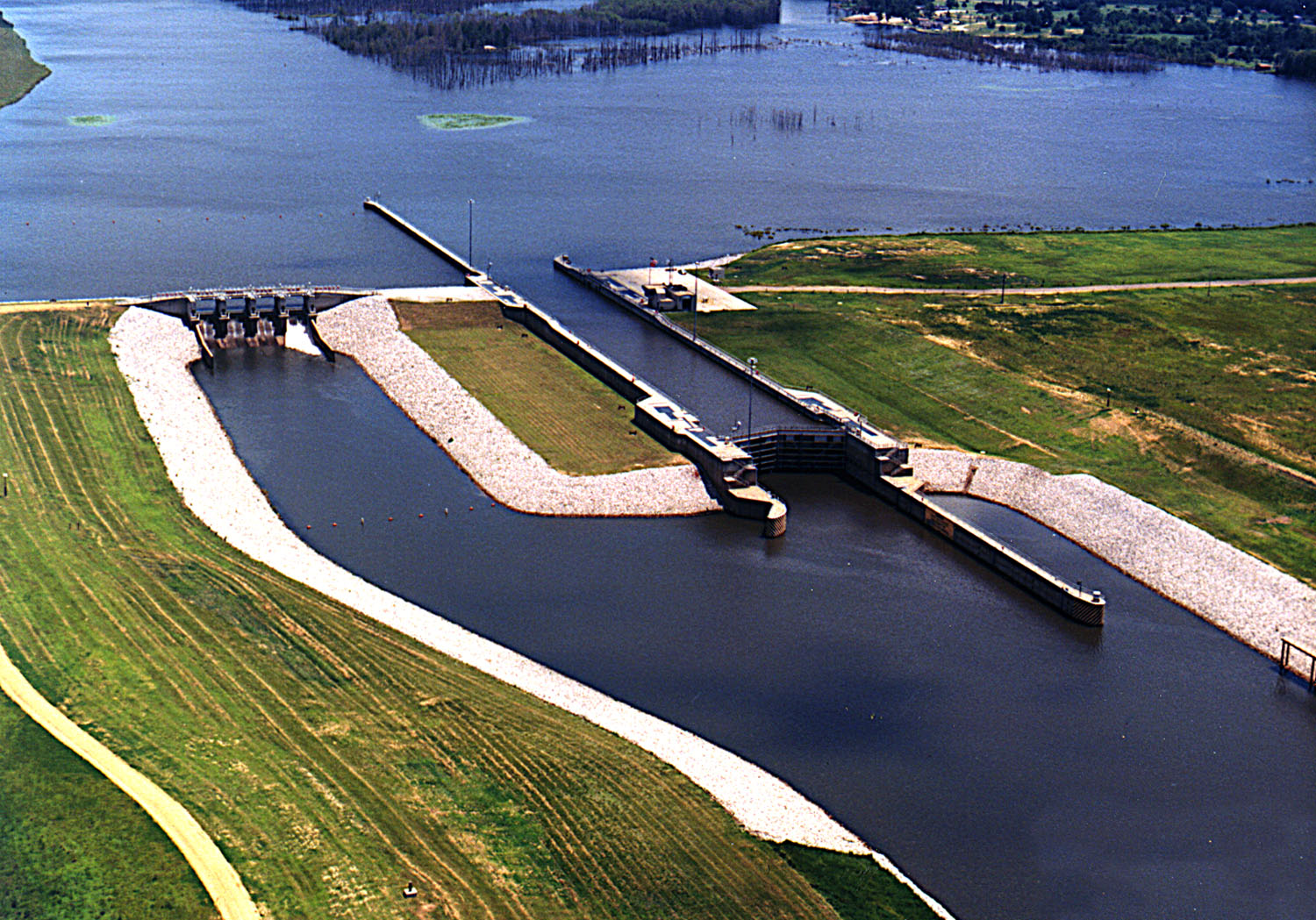
- Amory Lock and Dam
- 34°00′40″N 88°29′21″W
- Waterway: Tennessee–Tombigbee Waterway
- Country: United States
- State: Mississippi
- County: Monroe County
- Maintained by: United States Army Corps of Engineers
- Operation: Hydraulic
- First built: 1984
- Length: 600 ft (180 m)
- Width: 110 ft (34 m)
- Fall: 30 ft (9.1 m)

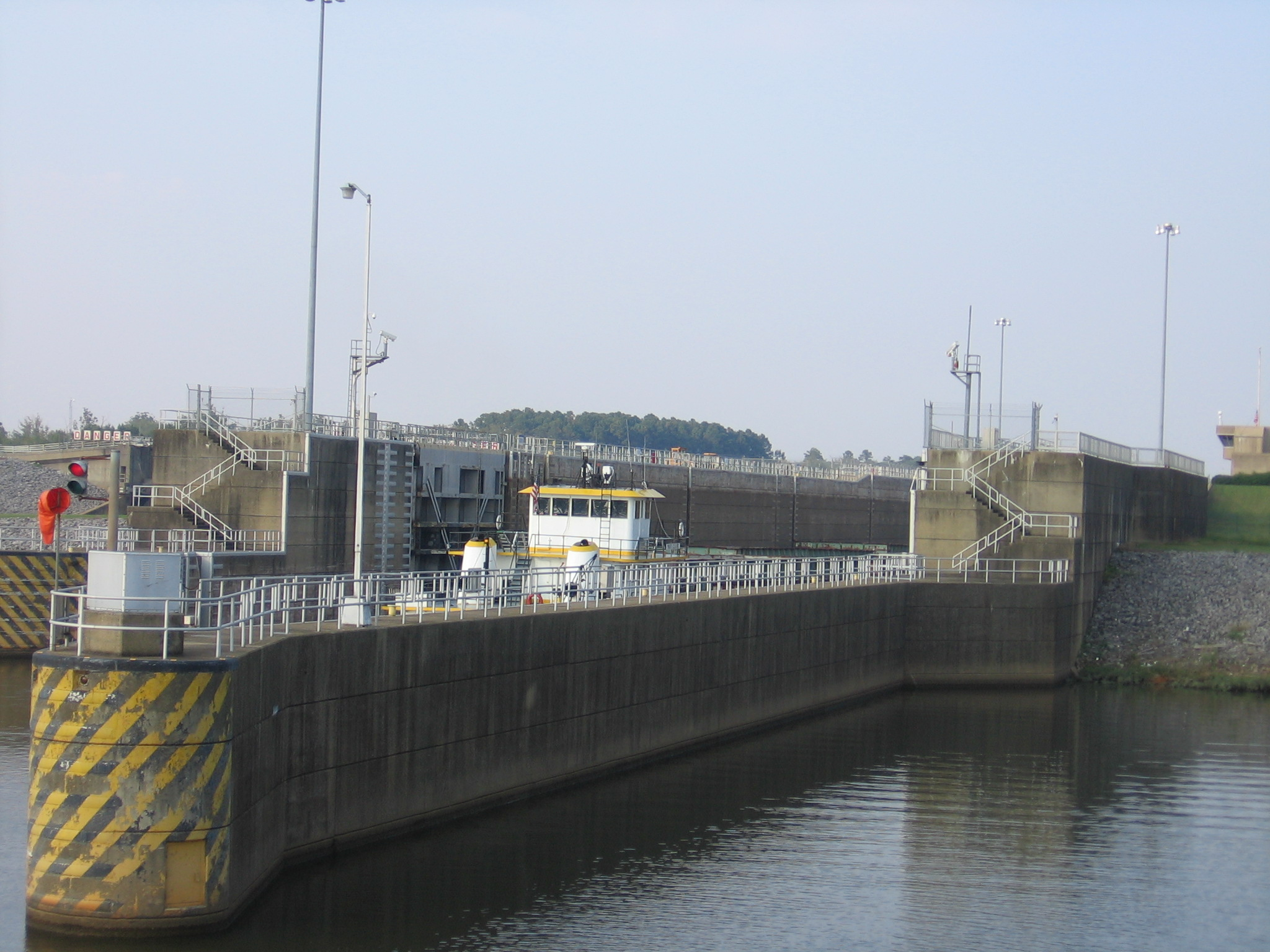
Amory Lock

The Amory Lock (formerly named Lock A) is a lock and dam on the Tennessee-Tombigbee Waterway.

== Location ==
The Amory Lock is located in the city of Amory, Mississippi, and the waterway forms the west and north boundary of the city. Mississippi Highway 6 crosses the waterway at an overpass south of the Amory Lock.

The Amory Lock is located at mile 371.1 on the waterway, representing the navigational distance from the southern end of the waterway at the Cochrane–Africatown USA Bridge on U.S. Route 90 in Mobile, Alabama.

== Specifications ==
The Amory Lock was constructed at a cost of $23.3 million, and it created a 914 acres (370 ha) lake north of the lock and dam.

All locks on the waterway use marine radio channel 16 for standby; the Amory Lock's unique marine radio channel is 14.

== Schedule ==
All locks of the Tennessee-Tombigbee Waterway operate 24 hours a day, 7 days a week. For large vessels, lock operation is made on demand. For pleasure boats using the Amory Lock, the lock operates in the morning at 5, 7, 9, and 11 A.M., and in the afternoon at 1, 3, 5, and 7 P.M.

== Priority of usage ==
Certain vessels are given priority over others wishing to use the Amory Lock. The priority status from greatest to least is: U.S. military craft, commercial passenger craft, commercial tows, commercial fisherman, pleasure boats.
