= Amory School District =

School district in Mississippi

Address
- 124 N. Main St. Amory, Monroe County, Mississippi, 38821; United States

District information
- Type: Regular local school district
- Grades: PK - 12
- NCES District ID: 2800450

Students and staff
- Students: 1,537
- Teachers: 111.37
- Student–teacher ratio: 13.80

Other information
- Website: https://www.amoryschools.com

The Amory School District is a public school district based in Amory, Mississippi, United States. It serves most of Amory and some unincorporated areas.

== Schools ==
- Amory High School (grades 9-12)
  - Amory Vocational Center
- Amory Middle School (grades 6-8)
- East Amory Elementary School (grades 3-5)
- West Amory Elementary School (grades PK-2)

== Demographics ==
=== 2019-2020 school year ===
As of the 2019-2020 school year, there were a total of around 1,537 students enrolled in Amory School District and a total of 111 teachers working in the district.

=== 2006-07 school year ===
There were a total of 1,892 students enrolled in the Amory School District during the 2006–2007 school year. The gender makeup of the district was 50% female and 50% male. The racial makeup of the district was 35.41% African American, 63.74% White, 0.53% Hispanic, and 0.32% Asian. 45.4% of the district's students were eligible to receive free lunch.

Pre-2006-07 school years
School year	Enrollment	Gender makeup		Racial makeup				
School year	Enrollment	Female	Male	Asian	African American	Hispanic	Native American	White
2005-06	1,851	49%	51%	0.32%	35.06%	0.65%	–	63.97%
2004-05	1,838	49%	51%	0.27%	34.66%	0.76%	–	64.31%
2003-04	1,832	49%	51%	0.27%	35.48%	0.44%	–	63.81%
2002-03	1,882	49%	51%	0.16%	35.71%	0.16%	–	63.97%

== Accountability statistics ==
(2002-2007)
	2002-03	2003-04	2004-05	2005-06	2006-07
District accreditation status	Accredited	Accredited	Accredited	Accredited	Accredited
School performance classifications					
Level 5 (Superior Performing) Schools	1	1	1	1	1
Level 4 (Exemplary) Schools	2	2	2	2	1
Level 3 (Successful) Schools	0	0	0	0	1
Level 2 (Under Performing) Schools	0	0	0	0	0
Level 1 (Low Performing) Schools	0	0	0	0	0
Not assigned	1	1	1	1	1

== See also ==
- List of school districts in Mississippi
