= Amory, Mississippi =

- City
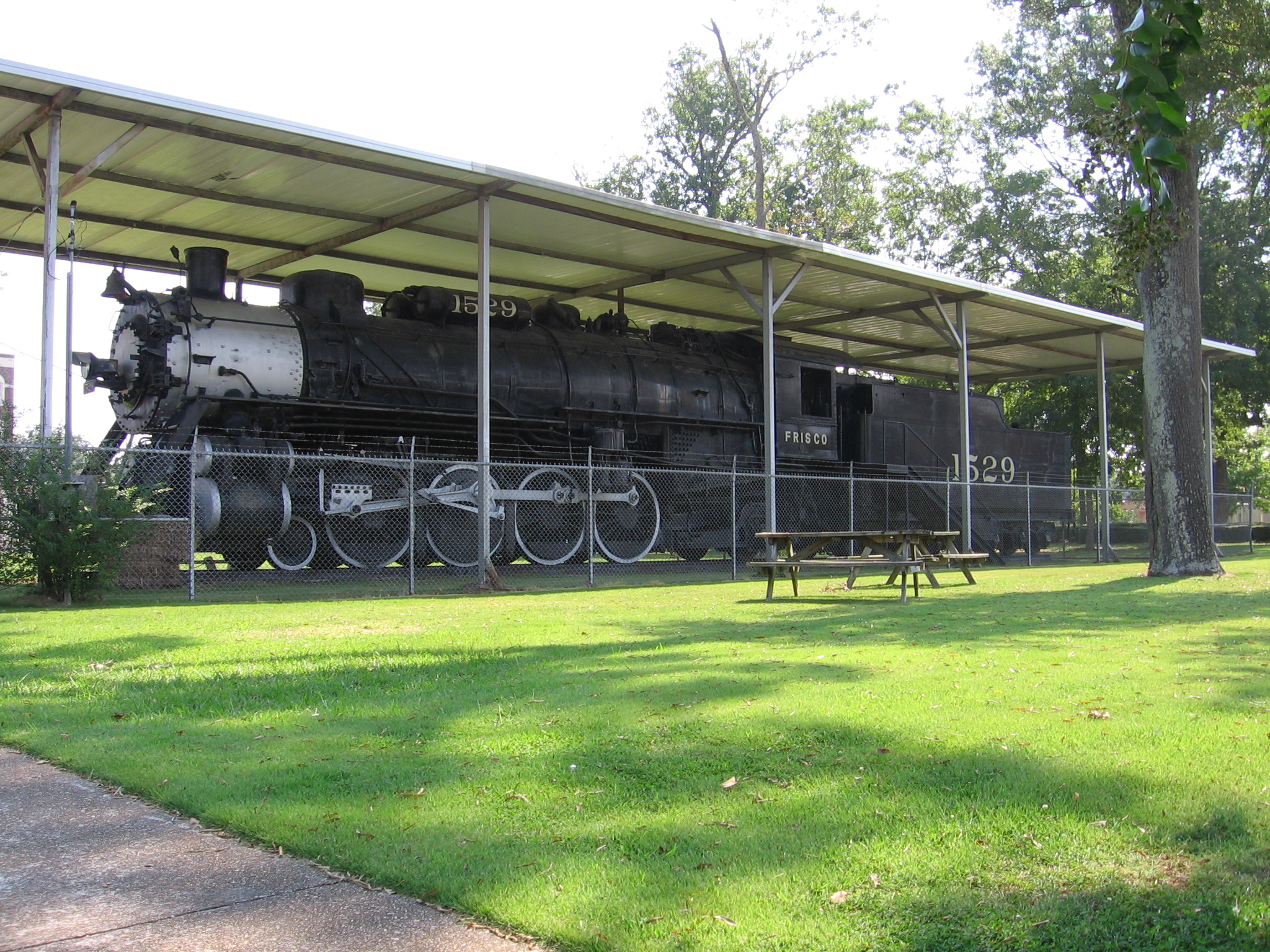
- Frisco Park in 2005

- Flag Logo

- Location within Monroe County and the state of Mississippi
- Coordinates: 33°59′14″N 88°29′10″W
- Country: United States
- State: Mississippi
- County: Monroe

Government
  - Mayor: Corey Glenn (I)

Area
  - Total: 13.14 sq mi (34.03 km^{2})
  - Land: 12.53 sq mi (32.46 km^{2})
  - Water: 0.61 sq mi (1.58 km^{2})
- Elevation: 240 ft (73 m)

Population (2020)
  - Total: 6,655
  - Density: 532.0/sq mi (205.39/km^{2})
- Time zone: UTC-6 (Central (CST))
  - Summer (DST): UTC-5 (CDT)
- ZIP Code: 38821
- Area code: 662
- FIPS code: 28-01260
- GNIS ID: 2403095
- Website: www.cityofamoryms.gov

Amory /ˈeɪ.mər.i/ is a city in Monroe County, Mississippi, United States. The population was 6,655 at the 2020 census, down from 7,316 in 2010. Located in the northeastern part of the state near the Alabama border, it was founded in 1887 as a railroad town by the Kansas City, Memphis and Birmingham Railroad. As a result, Cotton Gin Port, along the Tombigbee River to the west, was abandoned as businesses and people moved for railroad access.

== History ==
Amory was founded as a planned railroad town. The Kansas City, Memphis & Birmingham Railroad was expanding in the South and needed a midpoint between Memphis, Tennessee, and Birmingham, Alabama, to service their locomotives. They laid out the new town of Amory, near the Alabama border, in 1887.

Believing railroad access to be critical, people from nearby Cotton Gin Port, about 1.5 miles away and located along the Tombigbee River, abandoned their town and moved to Amory. All that remains of the former Cotton Gin Port are the ruins of buildings and an old cemetery.

Two field recordings were made at Monroe County Training School in Amory.

=== 2023 tornado ===
On the evening of Friday, March 24, 2023, Amory was struck by a fast-moving EF3 tornado, resulting in significant residential damage, as well as multiple injuries and two fatalities. At the Amory High School, cameras caught the tornado damaging the building, ripping the roof off the building, and flying debris impacted the schools' athletic facility. The same tornado also impacted Egypt prior, and Wren thereafter.

== Geography ==
Amory is in northern Monroe County, on the east side of the valley of the Tombigbee River. The Tennessee–Tombigbee Waterway forms the northwestern border of the city.

U.S. Route 278 passes through the south side of the city as Sixth Avenue, leading west 8 miles (13 km) the US 45 freeway and southeast 22 miles (35 km) to Sulligent, Alabama. Okolona, Mississippi, is 15 miles (24 km) to the west via US 278 and Mississippi Highway 41. State Highway 25 passes through Amory as Main Street, leading north 26 miles (42 km) to Fulton and south 16 miles (26 km) to Aberdeen, the Monroe county seat. State Highway 6 leads northwest from Amory 11 miles (18 km) to Nettleton and 26 miles (42 km) to Tupelo, crossing the Tennessee–Tombigbee Waterway over a span known locally as the "Singing Bridge" due to the distinct musical humming sound the bridge produces as vehicles drive across it.

According to the U.S. Census Bureau, Amory has a total area of 13.1 square miles (34 km^{2}), of which 12.5 square miles (32 km^{2}) are land and 0.6 square miles (1.6 km^{2}), or 4.63%, are water. Amory Lock on the Tennessee–Tombigbee Waterway and part of its upstream pool are along the northern edge of the city.

== Demographics ==
Historical population
Census	Pop.	Note	%±
1890	739		—
1900	1,211		63.9%
1910	2,122		75.2%
1920	2,861		34.8%
1930	3,214		12.3%
1940	3,727		16.0%
1950	4,990		33.9%
1960	6,474		29.7%
1970	7,236		11.8%
1980	7,307		1.0%
1990	7,093		−2.9%
2000	6,956		−1.9%
2010	7,316		5.2%
2020	6,655		−9.0%
U.S. Decennial Census

=== 2020 census ===
As of the 2020 census, Amory had a population of 6,655. The median age was 42.4 years. 22.8% of residents were under the age of 18 and 22.7% of residents were 65 years of age or older. For every 100 females there were 83.0 males, and for every 100 females age 18 and over there were 77.4 males age 18 and over.

There were 1,662 families residing in the city.

87.4% of residents lived in urban areas, while 12.6% lived in rural areas.

There were 2,680 households in Amory, of which 31.0% had children under the age of 18 living in them. Of all households, 42.2% were married-couple households, 16.1% were households with a male householder and no spouse or partner present, and 36.5% were households with a female householder and no spouse or partner present. About 29.8% of all households were made up of individuals and 15.1% had someone living alone who was 65 years of age or older.

There were 3,232 housing units, of which 17.1% were vacant. The homeowner vacancy rate was 2.2% and the rental vacancy rate was 30.9%.

Racial composition as of the 2020 census
Race	Number	Percent
White	4,552	68.3%
Black or African American	1,778	26.7%
American Indian and Alaska Native	16	0.2%
Asian	19	0.3%
Native Hawaiian and Other Pacific Islander	1	0.0%
Some other race	77	1.2%
Two or more races	223	3.3%
Hispanic or Latino (of any race)	152	2.3%

=== 2010 census ===
As of the 2010 United States census, there were 7,316 people living in the city. 69.5% were White, 29.0% African American, 0.2% Native American, 0.2% Asian, 0.3% from some other race and 0.7% of two or more races. 1.4% were Hispanic or Latino of any race.

=== 2000 census ===
As of the census of 2000, there were 6,956 people, 2,876 households, and 1,903 families living in the city. The population density was 927.2 inhabitants per square mile (358.0/km^{2}). There were 3,147 housing units at an average density of 419.5 per square mile (162.0/km^{2}). The racial makeup of the city was 69.85% White, 29.18% African American, 0.12% Native American, 0.06% Asian, 0.16% from other races, and 0.63% from two or more races. Hispanic or Latino of any race were 0.79% of the population.

There were 2,876 households, out of which 30.6% had children under the age of 18 living with them, 43.8% were married couples living together, 19.3% had a female householder with no husband present, and 33.8% were non-families. 31.7% of all households were made up of individuals, and 15.7% had someone living alone who was 65 years of age or older. The average household size was 2.36 and the average family size was 2.97.

In the city, the population was spread out, with 25.9% under the age of 18, 8.0% from 18 to 24, 25.0% from 25 to 44, 22.5% from 45 to 64, and 18.7% who were 65 years of age or older. The median age was 38 years. For every 100 females, there were 82.4 males. For every 100 females age 18 and over, there were 75.3 males.

The median income for a household in the city was $28,789, and the median income for a family was $37,891. Males had a median income of $30,913 versus $21,356 for females. The per capita income for the city was $14,092. About 17.1% of families and 20.7% of the population were below the poverty line, including 31.6% of those under age 18 and 17.4% of those age 65 or over.

== Economy ==
Business sectors in the city include sports equipment manufacturing, wood pulp processing, and the furniture and textile industries. The city is served by North Mississippi Medical Center Gilmore–Amory.

== Arts and culture ==
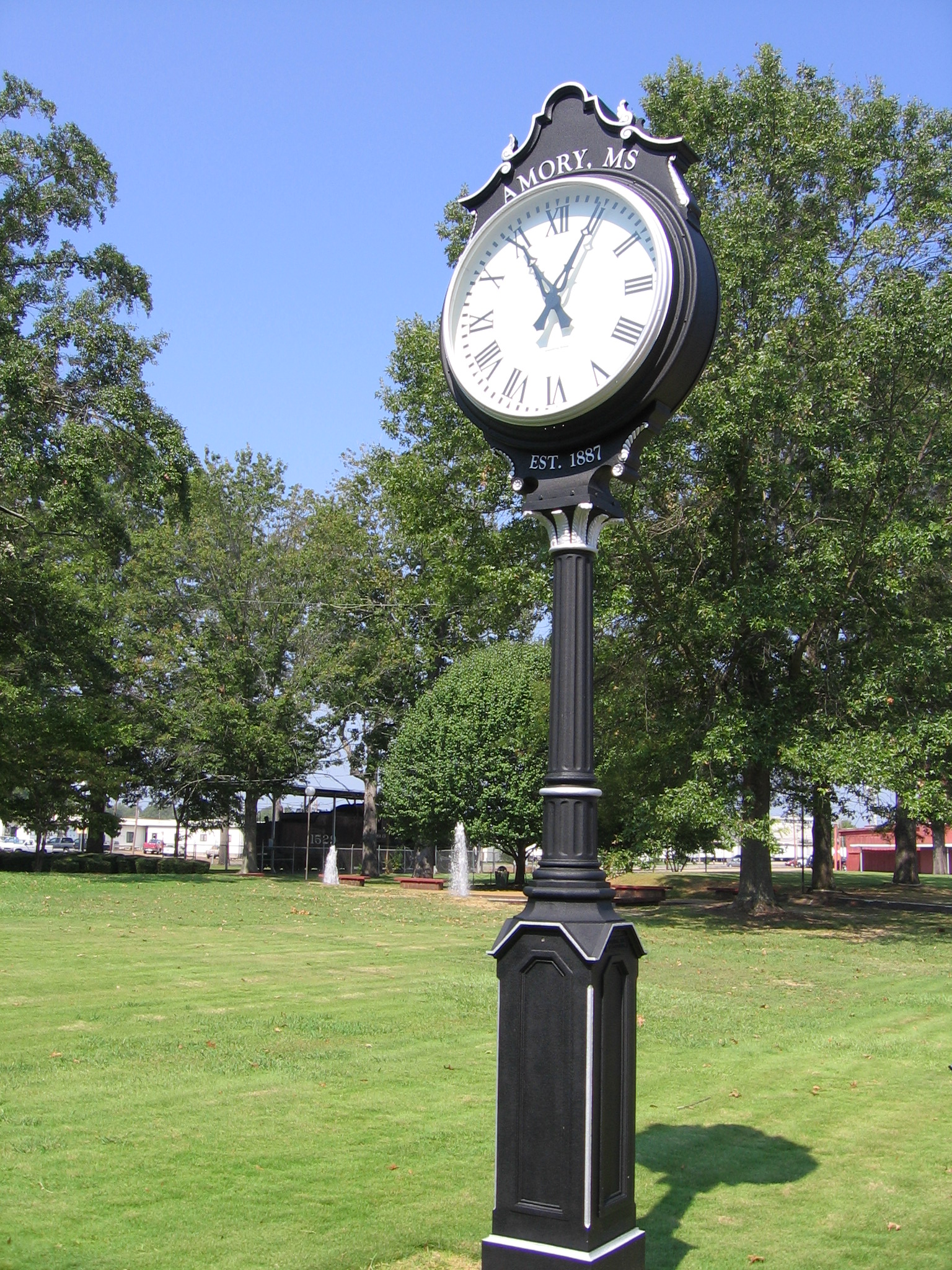
Frisco Park in 2005

In honor of its cultural and historical heritage, the city of Amory holds the annual "Railroad Festival" in April in Frisco Park in downtown. Among other attractions, the Festival includes southern foods—such as fried catfish, barbecue, and apple fritters— rides, arts and crafts, and live music, most notably the local band The Gents who have brought fans out for years with their Motown, Blues Brothers, and classic oldies show. While spring rains are possible during the 3-day festival, turnout is generally quite large, with as many as 40,000 visiting the festival over the period of a weekend. The festival was cancelled in 2020 and 2021 due to the COVID-19 pandemic. It returned in 2022, however it was cancelled again in 2023, as Amory was still recovering from the deadly tornado that hit the city on March 24. The city was able to have the Railroad Festival in 2024 though.

In addition to the annual Railroad Festival, Amory held "Entertainment for Education", also known as "Stars Over Mississippi", an event in which a number of celebrities and entertainers hosted a benefit concert to raise funds for local scholarships. Past performers and attendees included Vince Gill, Dolly Parton, Nell Carter, Sandi Patty, Kathie Lee Gifford, Kathy Ireland, Brad Paisley, Brooks and Dunn, Ray Romano, Tony Danza, Patricia Heaton, Doris Roberts, Whoopi Goldberg, Brad Garrett, and Prince Edward.

== Education ==
Most of Amory is served by the Amory School District, while a small portion is served by the Monroe County School District.

Amory Christian Academy is a small private Fundamentalist Baptist school in Amory.

== Infrastructure ==
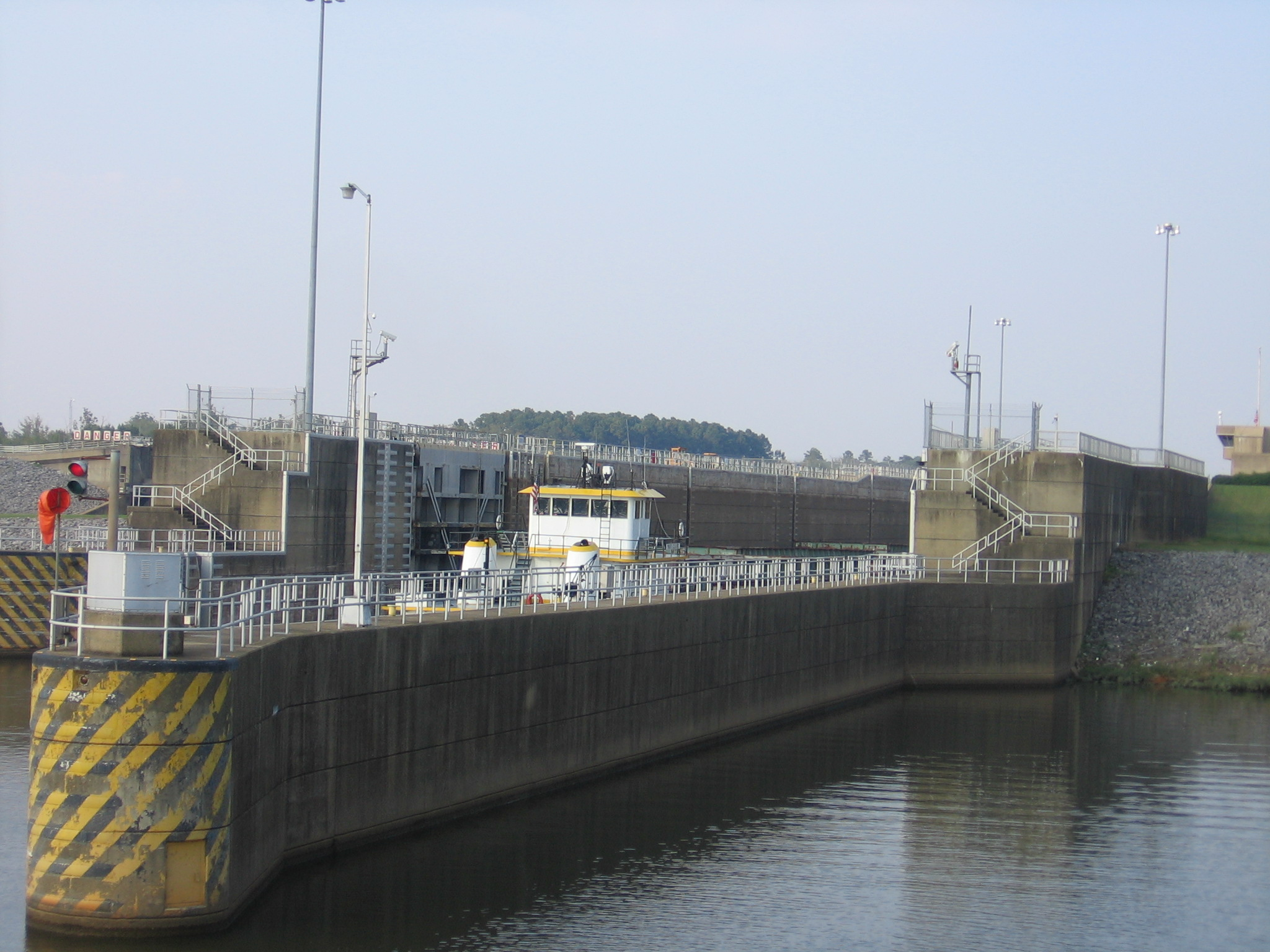
Amory Lock

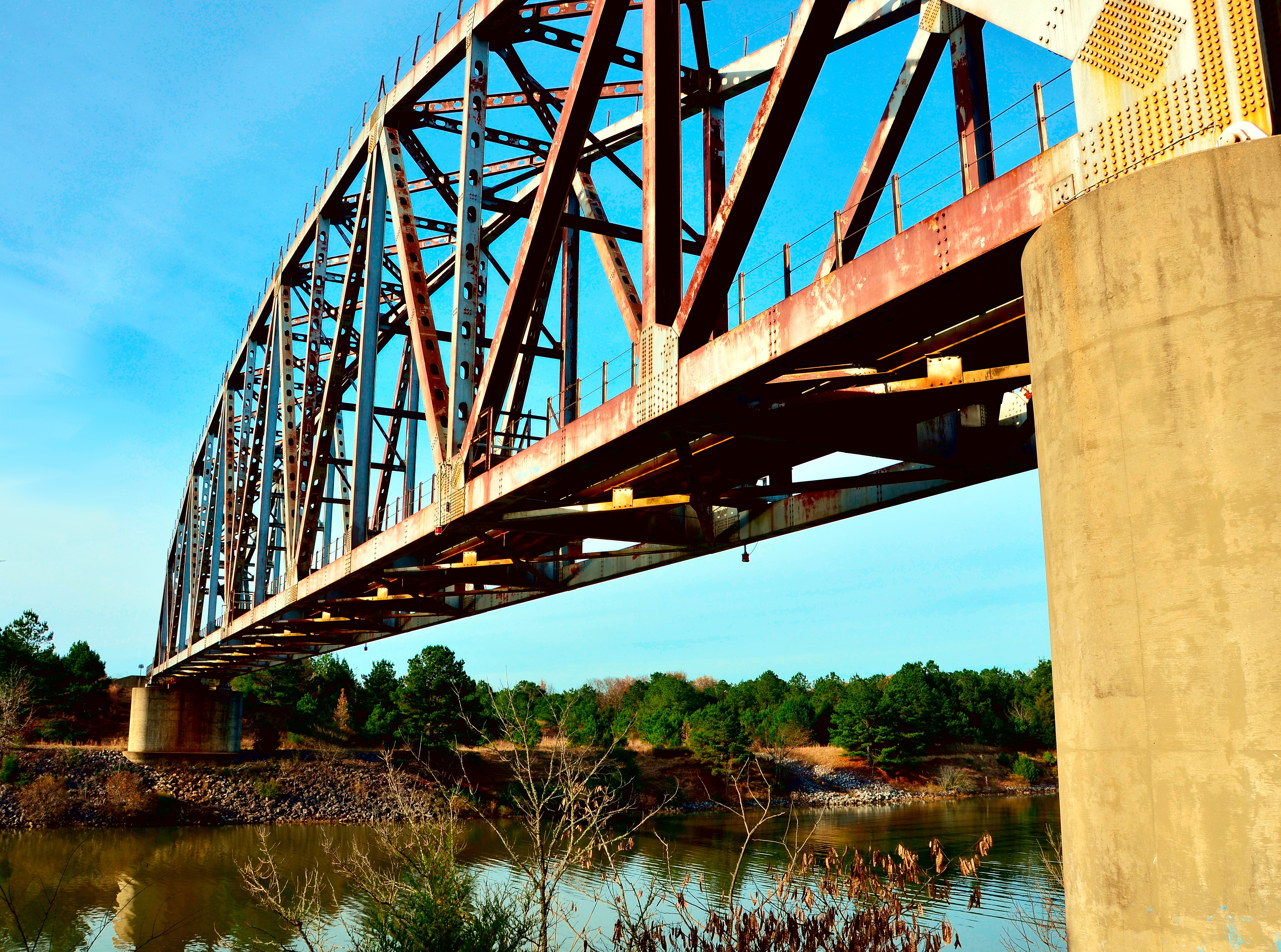
BNSF Railway bridge over Tennessee-Tombigbee Waterway, Amory, Mississippi

=== Transportation ===
Road transport is served by US 278, Mississippi Highway 6, and Mississippi Highway 25. Rail transport is offered by BNSF Railway, the Alabama and Gulf Coast Railway, and the Mississippian Railway. Ship transport can be accommodated on the Tennessee-Tombigbee Waterway.

== Notable people ==
- Lucille Bogan, classic female blues singer
- Hob Bryan, member of the Mississippi Senate
- Jim Burrow, former professional football defensive back, father of Joe Burrow
- Lt. Col. Herman Carter, one of the original 33 Tuskegee Airmen
- John Dye, actor known for his role of Andrew on Touched by an Angel
- Rufus French, All-American football player
- Gary Grubbs, actor
- David Hadley, former NFL defensive back
- Will Hall, college football coach
- Trent Harmon, winner of American Idol Season 15
- Ulysses Hollimon, Negro league baseball player
- Dennis Johnson, NFL Coach
- John Johnson, former member of the Mississippi House of Representatives and Mississippi Senate
- Tevin Jones, wide receiver for the Saskatchewan Roughriders of the Canadian Football League
- Jon Ray Lancaster, member of the Mississippi House of Representatives
- Brian Maxcy, pitcher for the Detroit Tigers
- Mitch Moreland, first baseman and right fielder for the Texas Rangers, Boston Red Sox and Oakland Athletics
- Matt Schnell, mixed martial artist
- Taylor Spreitler, actress
- Butch Thompson, head baseball coach, Auburn University
- Shaquille Vance, Paralympic sprinter
- Marcus West, former NFL player and current assistant coach for the Buffalo Bills

== In popular culture ==
- "Blue Suede Shoes" was written by Carl Perkins during a trip to Amory, for a concert with Elvis Presley and Johnny Cash in 1955.

== See also ==
- St. Louis-San Francisco Railway
