= U.S. Route 431 in Alabama =

Highway in Alabama

U.S. Route 431
- State Route 1
- US 431 highlighted in red

Route information
- Maintained by ALDOT
- Length: 352.958 mi (568.031 km)
- Existed: January 1954–present

Major junctions
- South end: US 231 / US 231 Bus. / US 431 Bus. / SR 1 / SR 210 in Dothan
- US 80 in Phenix City; US 82 in Eufaula; I-85 / US 29 in Opelika; I-20 east of Oxford; US 78 in Oxford; US 278 in Gadsden; I-59 in Attalla; I-565 / US 72 / US 231 in Huntsville
- North end: US 231 / US 431 at the Tennessee state line near Hazel Green

Location
- Country: United States
- State: Alabama
- Counties: Houston, Henry, Barbour, Russell, Lee, Chambers, Randolph, Cleburne, Calhoun, Etowah, Marshall, Madison

Highway system
- United States Numbered Highway System; List; Special; Divided; Alabama State Highway System; Interstate; US; State
| ← I-422 | → I-459 |
| ← SR 959 | SR 1 | → SR 2 |

U.S. Route 431 (US 431), internally designated by the Alabama Department of Transportation (ALDOT) as State Route 1 (SR 1), is a major north–south state highway across the eastern part of the U.S. state of Alabama. Although US 431's south end is in Dothan, SR 1 continues south for about 13 miles (21 km) along US 231 to the Florida state line.

== Route description ==
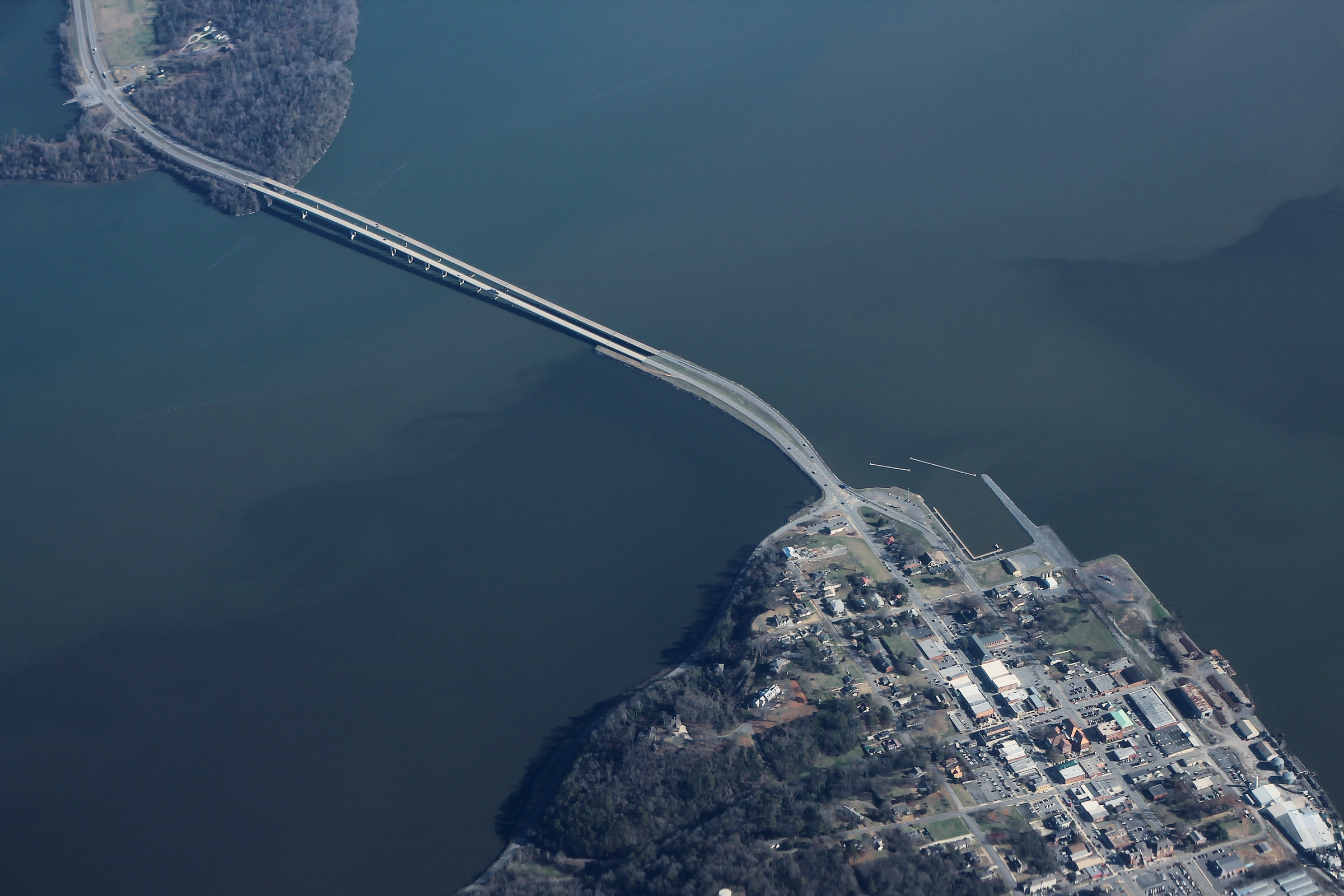
Bridge crossing the Tennessee River at Guntersville

Map of Dothan

SR 1 is primarily the unsigned partner route assigned to US 431.The two routes run concurrently from the southern terminus of US 431 at Dothan to the Tennessee state line. South of Dothan, SR 1 is assigned to US 231.

US 431 enters Alabama running concurrently with US 231. The route descends into Huntsville, becoming Memorial Parkway, a major thoroughfare across the city. The route engages in a 1.7-mile-long (2.7 km) concurrency with US 72 before a major interchange with I-565. Less than a mile later, US 431 turns off Memorial Parkway onto Governor's Drive, which it follows across Monte Sano Mountain. Descending into a valley, the route turns directly south, serving several bedroom communities of Huntsville.

The route crosses the Tennessee River eight miles (13 km) downstream of Guntersville Dam, serving the fishing city of Guntersville. Climbing up a 7% grade, the route crests Sand Mountain, serving the local hubs of Albertville and Boaz before descending down into the Coosa Valley. Outside Attalla, the route intersects US 278. US 431 and US 278 run concurrently throughout Attalla, where the routes have a brief concurrency with US 11 and junction with I-59, and Gadsden, where the routes intersect US 411 and cross the Coosa River. East of the city, US 278 turns east while US 431 continues south.

The route continues south through the Ridge and Valley Province until it reaches Anniston, where the route follows a recently-opened bypass of the city. The route traverses Weisner Ridge before descending to its junctions with US 78 and I-20.

After a 3.7-mile (6.0 km) concurrency with I-20, the route turns south, where it traverses the Talladega National Forest and climbs into the Piedmont, where it follows a notoriously dangerous routing. The route serves Wedowee, Roanoke, and Lafayette before following a bypass of Opelika, where it junctions with I-85 and US 280.

Turning east overlapping US 280, the route descends down into the Gulf Coastal Plain before entering Phenix City. The route follows a bypass of the city, with a brief concurrency with US 80. The route turns off US 280 to the south of the city. The route heads inland, traversing rolling hills before descending into Eufaula, where it engages in another concurrency with US 82. Leaving US 82, the route turns inland, heading south into the Dougherty Pain and Alabama Wiregrass Region.

The route eventually reaches the Ross Clark Circle, which is US 84 at this point. It joins it as it passes through east Dothan. It loses US 84 and continues southwest independently with SR 210, the Ross Clark Circle. It junctions with SR 53 once again as it nears its southern terminus. The beltway turns to the northwest and junctions with US 231 and US 231 Bus. and US 431 Bus., both of which pass through Dothan. SR 1 turns south with US 231, The two business routes end, and US 431 ultimately ends its long journey across east Alabama.

== History ==
=== Four-lane routing ===
One of the criticisms of US 431 in its entirety from Kentucky to Alabama was that it was mainly a two-lane road. ALDOT has prioritized four-laning the route in Alabama as a viable north–south road corridor in the eastern part of the state.

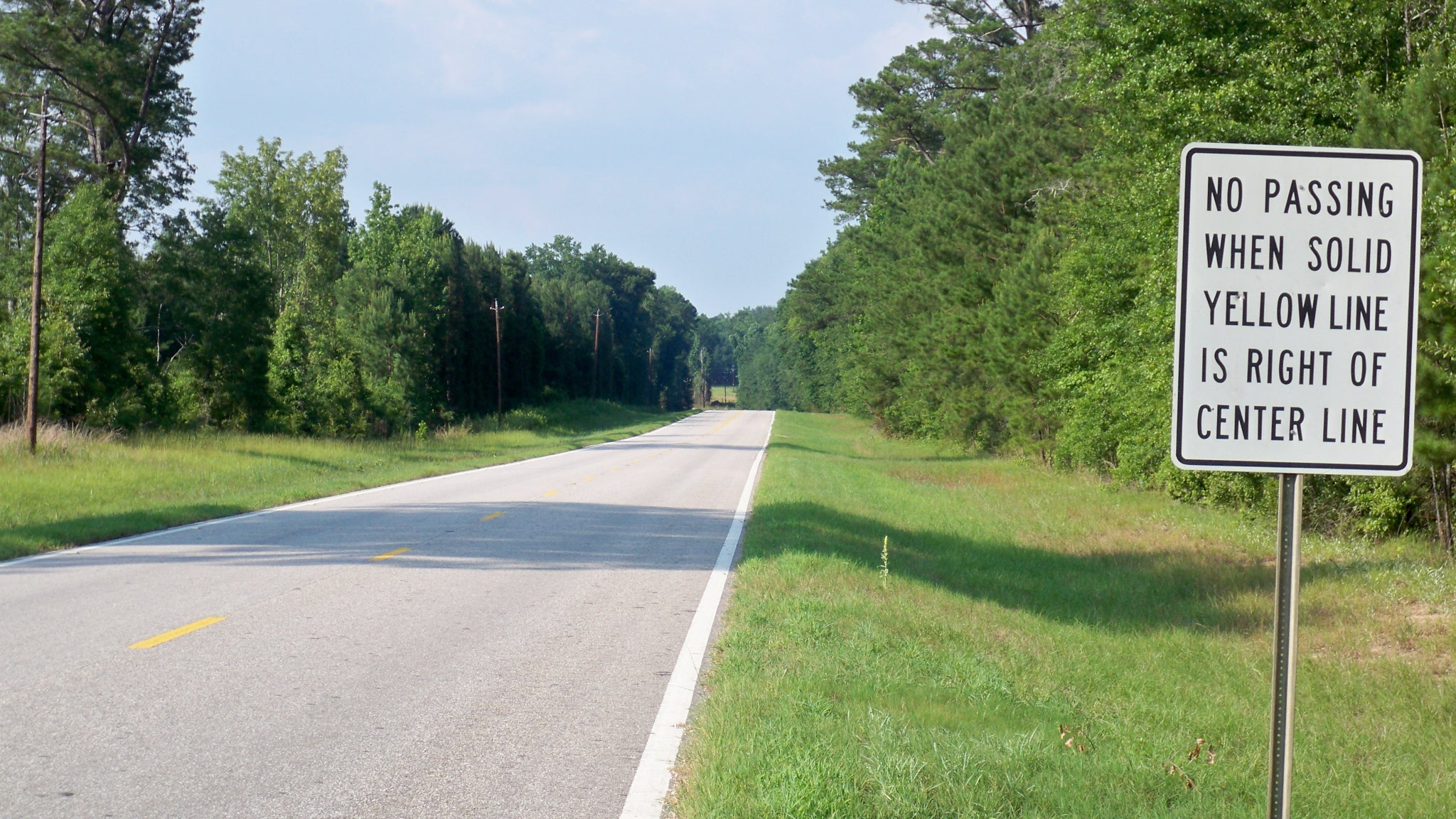
The old alignment of US 431 between Pittsview and the Barbour County line

Of particular concern was the segment from Seale south to the Barbour County line, where rolling hills along the original alignment limit the visibility of oncoming traffic, contributing to poor decisions by motorists to pass, resulting in numerous head-on collisions. In this segment alone, 31 people were killed in crashes between 1992 and 2006, leading Reader's Digest to proclaim it one of "America's Deadliest Highways" in 2000. After being contacted by and subsequently meeting the family of a fatal crash victim in 2003, ALDOT Director Joe McInnes decided to expedite the construction on the last remaining stretch of two-lane road between Seale and the Barbour County line. This 16-mile (26 km) section was completed and opened in late 2010. The old alignment in Russell County is still open to traffic and is now labeled County Route 137.

Traveling south from Tennessee, as of mid-2009, US 431 is a four-lane route to Oxford. Then, after diverting from I-20 east of Oxford at exit 191, it reverts to a two-lane highway southward to Opelika, with a brief four-lane stretch just south of Wedowee. From Opelika southward to its southern terminus in Dothan, US 431 is now open as a four-lane highway.

=== Anniston Eastern Bypass ===
The Anniston Eastern Bypass, officially named the McClellan Veterans Parkway, is a realigned US 431, two miles (3.2 km) east of downtown Anniston and downtown Oxford. Since the early 1990s, bypasses have been planned on both sides of town to alleviate traffic on Quintard Avenue, the main north–south traffic artery in the region. Despite being planned for years, construction did not begin until after receiving funding in a 2009 economic stimulus bill. Prior to the start of construction, archeological work on part of the route that passed through Fort McClellan located Native American spearpoints and an American Civil War homestead.

The bypass runs from I-20 exit 188 (Leon Smith Parkway), following the Golden Springs Road northwards, and cross the Choccolocco Foothills, then crosses over SR 21/McClellan Boulevard. It is complete from McIntosh Road to where the former alignment of US 431 merged with SR 21 which was resconstructed. The northern portion, which began construction in 2010, is built with two at-grade intersections (McClellan Bypass and Summerall Road) and one trumpet interchange (SR 21/McClellan Boulevard). Much development has been the result of this highway in the past decade along I-20 in Oxford and it is regarded as a way to redevelop McClellan as well as north Anniston.

The total cost of the project was $164 million; the final stretch of the road to be constructed is complete as of December 2015, and work on the US 431 tie-in continued into 2016 before completion. US 431 follows this route from I-20 northward.

== Major intersections ==
| County | Location | mi | km | Destinations | Notes |
|---|---|---|---|---|---|
| Houston | Dothan | 0.000 | 0.000 | US 231 / US 231 Bus. north / US 431 Bus. north (South Oates Street) / SR 210 (Ross Clark Circle) – Ozark, Enterprise, Ashford, Headland, Panama City | Southern end of US 431; SR 1 follows US 231 from this point southward |
| Houston | Dothan | 12.173 | 19.591 | SR 53 – Cottonwood | |
| Houston | Dothan | 10.442 | 16.805 | US 84 / US 84 Bus. west (SR 12/East Main Street) – Ashford | Southern end of concurrency with US 84 |
| Houston | Dothan | 9.967 | 16.040 | SR 52 – Columbia | |
| Houston | Dothan | 7.062 17.838 | 11.365 28.707 | US 84 / US 431 Bus. (SR 1/Reeves Street) / SR 210 – Ozark, Headland, Eufaula | Northern end of concurrency with SR 210/US 84; SR 1 follows US 431 Bus. through Dothan; southern end of concurrency with SR 1; mileposts switch from SR 210 to SR 1 |
| Henry | Headland | 25.754 | 41.447 | SR 134 – Abbeville, Headland, Columbia | |
| Henry | Headland | 26.270 | 42.277 | SR 173 north – Newville | Southern terminus of SR 173 |
| Henry | Abbeville | 39.748 | 63.968 | SR 27 – Ozark, Abbeville | |
| Henry | Abbeville | 42.396 | 68.230 | SR 10 – Blue Springs, Abbeville | |
| Barbour | | 59.970 | 96.512 | SR 95 south | Northern terminus of SR 95 |
| Barbour | Eufaula | 61.908 | 99.631 | SR 131 south – Bakerhill | Northern terminus of SR 131 |
| Barbour | Eufaula | 64.058 | 103.091 | SR 30 west – Clayton, Troy | Eastern terminus of SR 30 |
| Barbour | Eufaula | 66.823 | 107.541 | US 82 east (SR 6 east/Barbour Street) | Southern end of concurrency with US 82 |
| Barbour | Eufaula | 68.307 | 109.929 | US 82 west (SR 6 west) – Montgomery | Northern end of concurrency with US 82 |
| Barbour | | 74.949 | 120.619 | SR 165 north / SR 285 – Cottonton | Southern terminus of SR 165/285 |
| Russell | Seale | 96.895 | 155.937 | SR 26 west / CR 18 east – Hurtsboro, Union Springs | Eastern terminus of SR 26 |
| Russell | Seale | 99.105 | 159.494 | SR 169 north / CR 138 east – Phenix City, Seale | Southern terminus of SR 169 |
| Russell | | 109.155 | 175.668 | SR 165 south (Fort Mitchell Road) | Northern terminus of SR 165 |
| Russell | Phenix City | 112.081 | 180.377 | US 280 east (SR 38 east) – Birmingham, Opelika, Columbus, Atlanta | Western end of concurrency with US 280 |
| Russell | Phenix City | 113.942 | 183.372 | US 80 west (SR 8 west) – Montgomery | Western end of concurrency with US 80 |
| Russell | Phenix City | 114.888 | 184.894 | US 80 east (SR 8 east) – Columbus | Eastern end of concurrency with US 80 |
| Lee | Opelika | 137.253 | 220.887 | I-85 / US 29 (SR 15) / US 280 west (SR 38 west) – Montgomery, Atlanta | Western end of concurrency with US 280; I-85 Exit 62 |
| Chambers | Waverly | 149.840 | 241.144 | SR 147 south – Auburn | Northern terminus of SR 147 |
| Chambers | Lafayette | 158.859 | 255.659 | SR 50 | |
| Chambers | Lafayette | 160.794 | 258.773 | SR 77 north – Wadley | Southern terminus of SR 77 |
| Randolph | Roanoke | 180.783 | 290.942 | SR 22 – Roanoke, Rock Mills | |
| Randolph | Wedowee | 194.314 | 312.718 | SR 48 west – R. L. Harris Dam | Southern end of concurrency with SR 48 |
| Randolph | Wedowee | 194.437 | 312.916 | SR 48 east (Woodland Avenue) | Northern end of concurrency with SR 48 |
| Cleburne | Hollis Crossroads | 212.540 | 342.050 | SR 9 – Ashland, Montgomery, Atlanta | |
| Cleburne | | 217.805 | 350.523 | SR 281 | SR 281 crosses US 431 on an overpass, but the two routes do not actually intersect. SR 281 is accessible via a county road just south of the overpass. |
| Calhoun | | 221.328 191.859 | 356.193 308.767 | I-20 east / SR 301 north – Atlanta | I-20 Exit 191/Southern end of I-20 overlap/Southern terminus of SR 301, which follows former alignment of US 431 northward to US 78/mileposts switch from SR-1 to I-20 |
| Calhoun | Oxford | 188.151 225.036 | 302.800 362.160 | I-20 west – Birmingham | I-20 Exit 188/Northern end of I-20 overlap/mileposts switch from I-20 to SR-1 |
| Calhoun | Oxford | 225.269 | 362.535 | US 78 (SR 4) | Interchange |
| Calhoun | Anniston | 232.534 | 374.227 | SR 21 (McClellan Boulevard) – Anniston, Jacksonville | Partial cloverleaf/trumpet interchange |
| Calhoun | Alexandria | 240.300 | 386.725 | SR 144 west – Ohatchee | Eastern terminus of SR 144 |
| Calhoun | | 247.070 | 397.621 | SR 204 east – Jacksonville | Western terminus of SR 204 |
| Etowah | Gadsden | 258.458 | 415.948 | US 278 east (SR 74 east/Piedmont Cut-Off) – Hokes Bluff, Piedmont, Atlanta | Eastern end of concurrency with US 278 |
| Etowah | Gadsden | 260.232 | 418.803 | SR 291 south (Hood Avenue) to I-759 – Gadsden State Community College | Northern terminus of SR 291 |
| Etowah | Gadsden | 260.519 | 419.265 | US 411 (SR 25/Albert Rains Boulevard) – Rainbow City, Ashville, Centre | Partial cloverleaf interchange |
| Etowah | Gadsden | 261.994 | 421.638 | SR 211 north (North 12th Street) | Southern terminus of SR 211 |
| Etowah | Gadsden | 265.274 | 426.917 | I-59 – Birmingham, Chattanooga | I-59 Exit 183 |
| Etowah | Attalla | 266.117 | 428.274 | US 11 north (SR 7 north/3rd Street) | Southern end of concurrency with US 11 |
| Etowah | Attalla | 266.449 | 428.808 | US 11 south (SR 7 south/3rd Street) | Northern end of concurrency with US 11 |
| Etowah | Attalla | 268.363 | 431.888 | US 278 west (SR 74 west) – Cullman | Western end of concurrency with US 278 |
| Etowah | Attalla | 268.829 | 432.638 | SR 77 south – Lincoln, Walnut Grove | Northern terminus of SR 77 |
| Etowah | Sardis City | 277.880 | 447.205 | SR 205 north | Southern terminus of SR 205 |
| Marshall | Boaz | 280.544 | 451.492 | SR 168 (Mill Avenue) – Douglas | |
| Marshall | Albertville | 286.741 | 461.465 | SR 75 to SR 68 – Geraldine | |
| Marshall | Guntersville | 292.423 | 470.609 | SR 205 south | Northern terminus of SR 205 |
| Marshall | Guntersville | 294.742 | 474.341 | SR 79 south – Blountsville, Birmingham | Southern end of concurrency with SR 79 |
| Marshall | Guntersville | 295.822 | 476.079 | SR 69 south – Cullman, Arab | Northern terminus of SR 69 |
| Marshall | Guntersville | 296.190 | 476.672 | SR 227 south (Lusk Street) – Lake Guntersville State Park | Northern terminus of SR 227 |
| Marshall | Guntersville | 302.114 | 486.205 | SR 79 north – Scottsboro | Northern end of concurrency with SR 79 |
| Madison | Huntsville | 333.702 | 537.041 | US 231 south (Memorial Parkway) / SR 53 north (Governors Drive) – Arab, Decatur | Southern end of northern concurrency with US 231; southern end of northern signed segment of SR 53 |
| Madison | Huntsville | 334.700 | 538.647 | I-565 / US 72 Alt. | |
| Madison | Huntsville | 335.207 | 539.463 | US 72 west (SR 2 west) / University Drive | Southern end of concurrency with US 72 |
| Madison | Huntsville | 336.884 | 542.162 | US 72 east | Northern end of concurrency with US 72 |
| Madison | Hazel Green | 352.958 | 568.031 | US 231 north / US 431 north | Continuation into Tennessee; northern terminus of SR 1 |
1.000 mi = 1.609 km; 1.000 km = 0.621 mi: Concurrency terminus

== See also ==
U.S. Route 431
| Previous state: Terminus | Alabama | Next state: Tennessee |
