= Alabama State Route 179 =

State highway in Alabama, United States

State Route 179

Route information
- Maintained by ALDOT
- Length: 10.434 mi (16.792 km)

Major junctions
- South end: US 278 in Howellton
- North end: SR 168 in Boaz

Location
- Country: United States
- State: Alabama
- Counties: Etowah, Marshall

Highway system
- Alabama State Highway System; Interstate; US; State
← SR 178	→ SR 180

State Route 179 (SR 179) is a 10.434-mile (16.792 km) state highway that serves as a north-south connection between western Etowah County and Boaz. The southern terminus of SR 179 is at its intersection with US 278, and the northern terminus is at its intersection with SR 168 southwest of downtown Boaz.

== Route description ==
State Route 179 begins at its intersection with US 278 in Howelton. From this point, the route travels in a northerly direction through its northern terminus at SR 168 southwest of Boaz.

== Major intersections ==
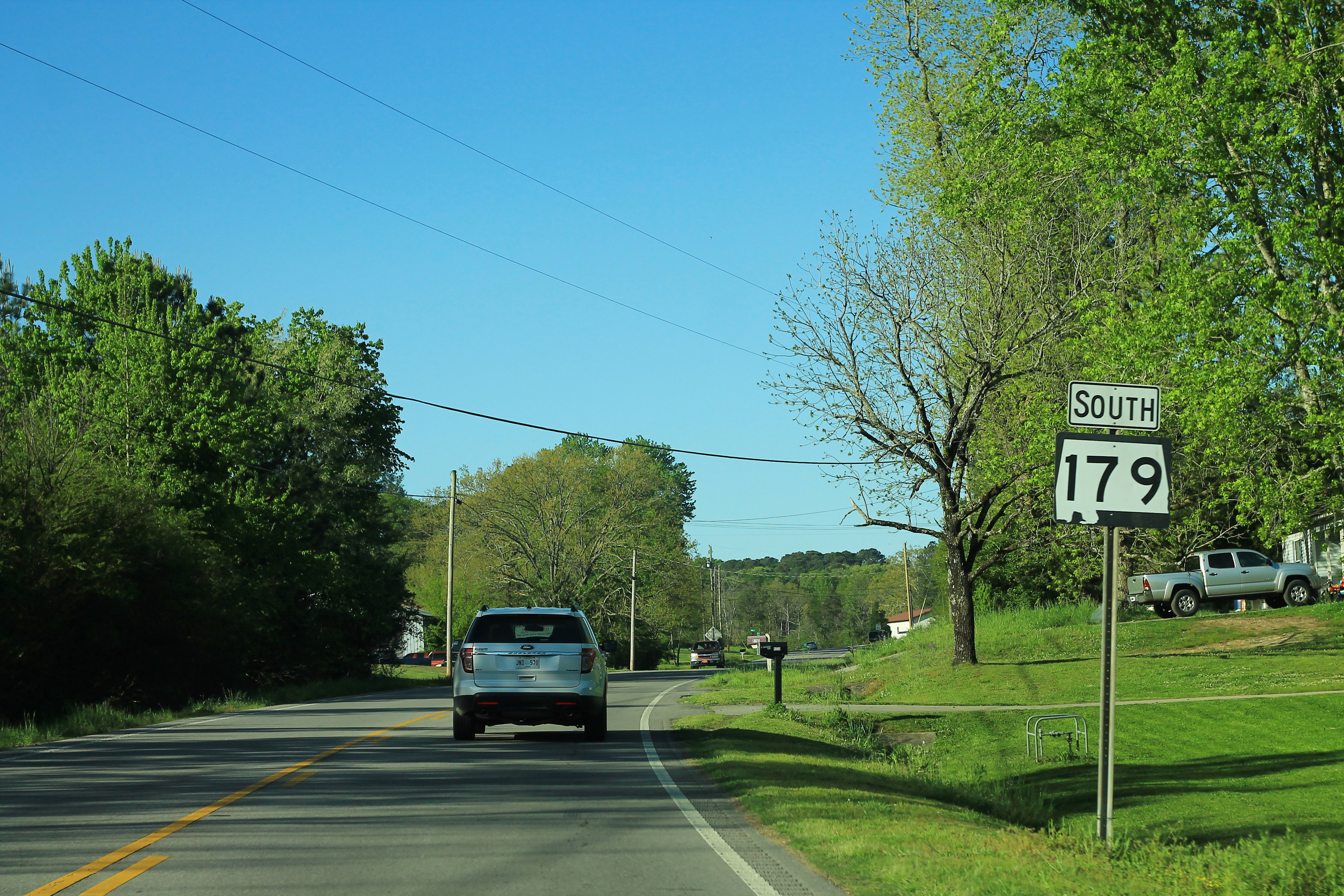
A sign denoting Alabama State Route 179, located near Boaz.

County	Location	mi	km	Destinations	Notes
Etowah	Howelton	0.0	0.0	US 278 (SR 74) – Ivalee, Attalla, Walnut Grove, Snead	Southern terminus
Marshall	Boaz	10.434	16.792	SR 168 – Downtown, Douglas	Northern terminus
1.000 mi = 1.609 km; 1.000 km = 0.621 mi

== See also ==
- List of state highways in Alabama
