= Alabama State Route 75 =

State highway in Alabama, United States

State Route 75

Route information
- Maintained by ALDOT
- Length: 113.220 mi (182.210 km)

Major junctions
- South end: I-59 at Birmingham
- US 11 at Birmingham; Future I-422 / SR 959 near Pinson; US 231 at Oneonta; US 278 at Snead; US 431 at Albertville; SR 35 at Rainsville; SR 40 at Henagar
- North end: SR 301 at the Georgia state line near Shiloh

Location
- Country: United States
- State: Alabama
- Counties: Jefferson, Blount, Marshall, DeKalb

Highway system
- Alabama State Highway System; Interstate; US; State
← SR 74	→ SR 76

State Route 75 (SR 75) is a 113.220-mile-long (182.210 km) state highway in the U.S. state of Alabama that travels northeastward from Birmingham to the Georgia state line. The highway travels west of U.S. Route 11 (US 11) and roughly parallels that highway, as well as Interstate 59 (I-59). Other cities and towns along the highway include Center Point, Pinson, Allgood, Oneonta, Albertville, Geraldine, and Rainsville.

== Route description ==
SR 75 begins at an interchange with I-59 and US 11 at the intersection of Parkway East, Roebuck Drive, and Gadsden Road in eastern Birmingham. Until the 1990s, SR 75 overlapped US 11 along 1st Avenue North into downtown Birmingham, continuing to the intersection of the two highways with US 78.

Traveling up to SR-51 in Pinson, the route travels along Roebuck Drive - a major thoroughfare for the far northeastern suburbs of Birmingham. Turning onto SR 151's right of way, the route continues as a four-lane divided highway into Blount; although some short portions are undivided. Traversing its way into a mountain valley, the route passes through Allgood and Oneonta before losing two lanes (one in each direction) and becoming a traditional two-lane rural road.

Climbing up to the highs of Sand Mountain just outside Oneonta, the route continues onward, serving several small communities in northern Blount County and southern Marshall County, such as Snead and Douglas. It makes its way straight into downtown Albertville before once again widening into a four-lane divided highway.

Upon crossing the county line into DeKalb County, the route narrows once again to two lanes as it winds along the mountainside. In Fyffe, the route once again widens to a four-lane divided highway. About a mile from the city limits of Rainsville, the route narrows again. Continuing onward up to the state line, the route serves several crossroads communities, such as Henagar and Ider.

== History ==
In 1999, work was completed to widen SR 75 to four lanes into Oneonta.

== Major intersections ==
County	Location	mi	km	Destinations	Notes
Jefferson	Birmingham	0.000	0.000	Roebuck Parkway south	Southern terminus
Jefferson	Birmingham	0.076	0.122	I-59 – Birmingham, Gadsden	I-59 exit 134
Jefferson	Birmingham	0.204	0.328	US 11 (Gadsden Highway / SR 7)	
Jefferson	Pinson	7.891	12.699	SR 151 south to SR 79 – Guntersville	Northern terminus of SR 151
Jefferson	Pinson			SR 959	Temporary eastern terminus of SR 959; future I-422
Blount	Oneonta	29.444	47.386	US 231 north (5th Street North / SR 53)	Southern end of US 231/SR 53 concurrency
Blount	Oneonta	29.479	47.442	US 231 south (6th Street South / SR 53)	Northern end of US 231/SR 53 concurrency
Blount	Oneonta	29.716	47.823	SR 132 east – Altoona	Western terminus of SR 132
Blount	Snead	43.106	69.372	US 278 (SR 74) – Cullman, Attalla	
Marshall	Douglas	48.874	78.655	SR 168 east – Boaz, Snead State Community College	Western terminus of SR 168
Marshall	Albertville	58.179	93.630	SR 205 (Main Street)	
Marshall	Albertville	58.796	94.623	US 431 (SR 1) – Huntsville, Gadsden, Boaz	
Marshall	Hustleville	62.631	100.795	SR 68 east – Collinsville, Centre	Western terminus of SR 68
DeKalb	Geraldine	71.866	115.657	SR 227 – Guntersville, Crossville	Provides access to Lake Guntersville State Park
DeKalb	Rainsville	84.294	135.658	SR 35 – Scottsboro, Fort Payne	
DeKalb	Henagar	95.403	153.536	SR 40 – Scottsboro, Hammondville	
DeKalb	Ider	102.361	164.734	SR 117 – Stevenson, Hammondville	
DeKalb		113.220	182.210	SR 301 north – Trenton	Continuation beyond Georgia state line
1.000 mi = 1.609 km; 1.000 km = 0.621 mi: Concurrency terminus
