= Alabama State Route 205 =

State highway in Alabama, United States

State Route 205

Route information
- Maintained by ALDOT
- Length: 15.185 mi (24.438 km)

Major junctions
- South end: US 431 in Sardis City
- SR 75 in Albertville
- North end: US 431 in Guntersville

Location
- Country: United States
- State: Alabama
- Counties: Marshall, Etowah

Highway system
- Alabama State Highway System; Interstate; US; State
← SR 204	→ SR 207

State Route 205 (SR 205) is a 15.185-mile-long (24.438 km) state highway that serves as a connection between the towns of Guntersville in Marshall County and Boaz in Etowah County. The highway serves as an alternate to U.S. Route 431 (US 431) through the area.

== Route description ==
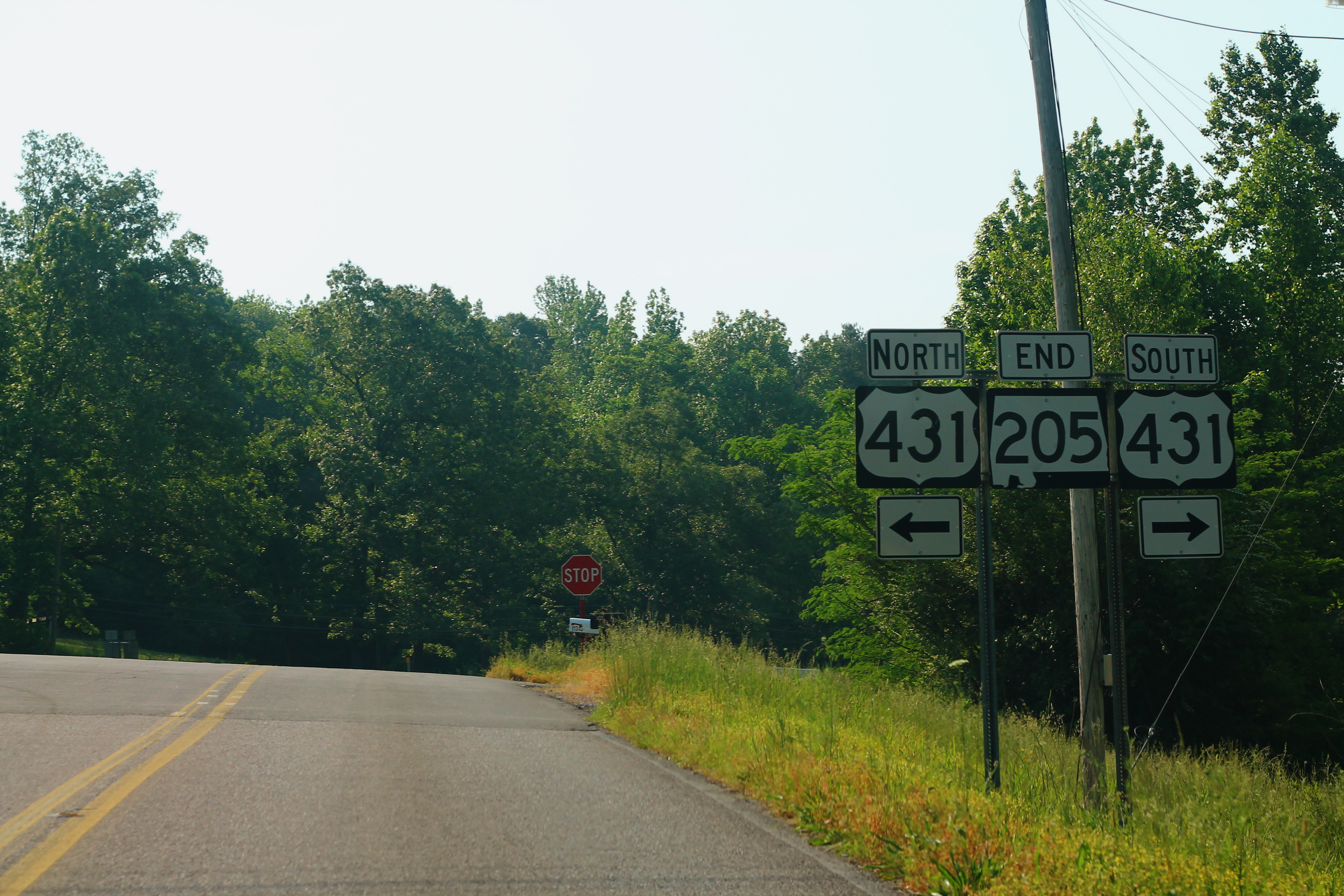
Southern terminus in Sardis City

The southern terminus is at an intersection with US 431 in Sardis City. From this point, the highway travels in a northerly direction through Boaz and Albertville prior to turning to the northwest en route to its northern terminus at another intersection with US 431 near Guntersville.

== History ==
SR 205 is routed along the roadway formerly designated as U.S. Route 241. During the 1940s, US 241 was relocated to the current routing of US 431. US 241 was changed to US 431 in 1953. In 2006, the portion of SR 205 in Etowah County is called The Jack Toney Memorial Highway.

== Major intersections ==
County	Location	mi	km	Destinations	Notes
Etowah	Sardis City	0.0	0.0	US 431 (SR 1) – Attalla, Boaz	Southern terminus
Marshall	Boaz	3.183	5.123	SR 168 (Mill Avenue) – Crossville, Douglas	
Marshall	Albertville	8.591	13.826	SR 75 (S Broad Street) – Douglas, Geraldine	
Marshall	Guntersville	15.185	24.438	US 431 (SR 1) – Downtown, Albertville	Northern terminus
1.000 mi = 1.609 km; 1.000 km = 0.621 mi
