= Gary Johnson Jr. =

American gridiron football player (born 1996)

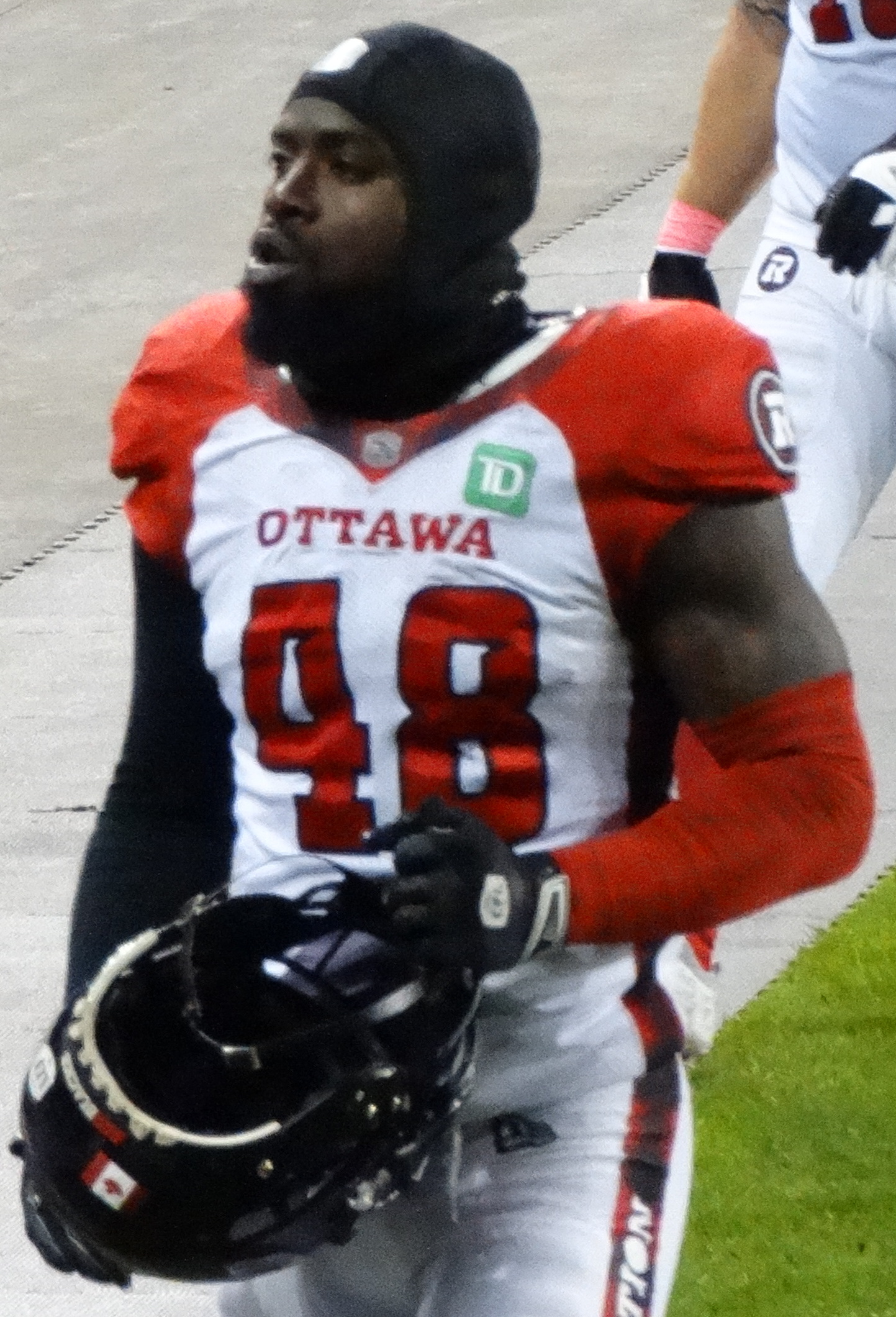
- Johnson with the Ottawa Redblacks in 2023

Profile
- Position: Linebacker

Personal information
- Born: August 2, 1996 (age 30); Douglas, Alabama, U.S.
- Listed height: 6 ft 0 in (1.83 m)
- Listed weight: 230 lb (104 kg)

Career information
- High school: Douglas
- College: Dodge City (2015–2016); Texas (2017–2018)
- NFL draft: 2019: undrafted

Career history
- 2019: Kansas City Chiefs*
- 2019: Washington Redskins*
- 2019–2022: Saskatchewan Roughriders
- 2023–2024: Ottawa Redblacks
- 2025: Calgary Stampeders
- * Offseason or practice squad member only

Awards and highlights
- Second-team All-Big 12 (2018)
- Stats at CFL.ca

Gary Johnson Jr. (born August 2, 1996) is an American professional football linebacker. He played college football at Dodge City Community College and Texas. He has been a member of the Kansas City Chiefs, Washington Redskins, Saskatchewan Roughriders, Ottawa Redblacks, and Calgary Stampeders.

== Early life ==
Johnson played high school football at Douglas High School in Douglas, Alabama. He also participated in track and field in high school, winning the 2015 Class 5A state title in the 100-meter dash with a time of 10.59 seconds.

== College career ==
=== Dodge City Community College ===
Johnson played college football at Dodge City Community College from 2015 to 2016 as a linebacker, earning All-Kansas Jayhawk Community College Conference (KJCCC) honors both years. He set a school record for career tackles with 215. He also had 11.5 sacks and five interceptions.

=== Texas ===
Johnson transferred to play for Texas from 2017 to 2018. He played in 13 games, starting seven, in 2017, recording 60 tackles, two sacks, one pass breakup, one forced fumble. He appeared in 13 games, all starts, in 2018, totaling 6.5 sacks, one pass breakup, two forced fumbles, one fumble recovery and a team-leading 90 tackles, garnering second team All-Big 12 Conference recognition.

== Professional career ==
=== Kansas City Chiefs ===
Johnson was signed by the Kansas City Chiefs of the National Football League (NFL) on May 4, 2019, after going undrafted in the 2019 NFL draft. He was released on June 13, 2019.

=== Washington Redskins ===
Johnson signed with the Washington Redskins of the NFL on August 17, 2019. He was released on August 31, 2019.

=== Saskatchewan Roughriders ===
Johnson was signed to the practice roster of the Saskatchewan Roughriders of the Canadian Football League (CFL) on October 6, 2019. He was promoted to the active roster on October 17, placed on injured reserve on October 25, and activated from injured reserve on November 1, 2019. Overall, he dressed in two games for the Roughriders in 2019, recording two special teams tackle. The 2020 CFL season was cancelled due to the COVID-19 pandemic in Canada. Johnson re-signed with the Roughriders on January 8, 2021. Johnson was placed on, and activated from, injured reserve several times during the 2021 season. Overall, he dressed in six games, totaling eight tackles on defense, 10 special teams tackles and one sack. Johnson was placed on, and activated from, injured reserve several times during the 2022 season and also had a stint on the disabled list. On August 22, 2022, he was placed on the suspended list for one game for violating the Roughriders' code of conduct due to a post-game incident. He dressed for six games in 2022, accumulating one tackle on defense and four special teams tackles.

=== Ottawa Redblacks ===
Johnson was signed by the Ottawa Redblacks of the CFL on February 14, 2023. Like previous seasons, he was placed on, and activated from, injured reserve several times in 2023. He dressed in 11 games, recording eight special teams tackles and one forced fumble. Johnson re-signed with the Redblacks on January 30, 2024. He dressed in 19 overall games in 2024, including his first playoff game, and recorded seven defensive tackles and five special teams tackles. He became a free agent upon the expiry of his contract on February 11, 2025.

=== Calgary Stampeders ===
On February 13, 2025, Johnson signed with the Calgary Stampeders. He played in one regular season game and had one defensive tackle. He became a free agent upon the expiry of his contract on February 10, 2026.
