= Alabama State Route 168 =

State highway in Alabama, United States

State Route 168

Route information
- Maintained by ALDOT
- Length: 17.392 mi (27.990 km)
- Existed: 1948–present

Major junctions
- West end: SR 75
- US 431
- East end: SR 68

Location
- Country: United States
- State: Alabama
- Counties: Marshall; DeKalb

Highway system
- Alabama State Highway System; Interstate; US; State
← SR 167	→ SR 169

State Route 168 (SR 168) is a 17.392-mile-long (27.990 km) route in the northeastern part of the state. The western terminus of the route is at its junction with SR 75 at Douglas. The eastern terminus of the route is at its junction with SR 68 approximately eight miles northeast of Boaz in southwestern DeKalb County.

== Route description ==
SR 168 is aligned along a two-lane road for its duration. From its western origin at Douglas in southeastern Marshall County, the route travels eastwardly as it leads towards Boaz. At Boaz, the route turns northeastwardly, crossing US 431 and leading into DeKalb County. The eastern terminus of the route is at Kilpatrick, an unincorporated community near the border of DeKalb and Marshall Counties.

SR 168 passes several outlet malls near downtown Boaz. The malls are located west of the junction between US 431 and SR 168.

== Major intersections ==
County	Location	mi	km	Destinations	Notes
Marshall	Douglas	0.000	0.000	SR 75 – Albertville, Snead	Western terminus
Marshall	Boaz	8.518	13.708	SR 179 south	Northern terminus of SR 179
Marshall	Boaz	9.943	16.002	SR 205 (Main Street) – Albertville, Mountainboro	
Marshall	Boaz	10.852	17.465	US 431 (SR 1) – Albertville, Attalla, Gadsden	
DeKalb	Kilpatrick	17.392	27.990	SR 68 – Crossville, Albertville	Eastern terminus
1.000 mi = 1.609 km; 1.000 km = 0.621 mi
