= Alabama State Route 169 =

State highway in Alabama, United States

State Route 169

Route information
- Maintained by ALDOT
- Length: 26.325 mi (42.366 km)

Major junctions
- South end: US 431 in Seale
- US 80 in Crawford
- North end: SR 51 in Opelika

Location
- Country: United States
- State: Alabama
- Counties: Lee, Russell

Highway system
- Alabama State Highway System; Interstate; US; State
← SR 168	→ SR 170

State Route 169 (SR 169) is a 26.325-mile (42.366 km) state highway that serves as a north-south connection between Opelika and Seale through Lee and Russell Counties. SR 169 intersects US 431 at its southern terminus and SR 51 at its northern terminus.

== Route description ==
SR 169 begins at its intersection with US 431 in Seale. From this point SR 169 travels in a northerly direction en route to US 80, where its shares a .543-mile (0.874 km) concurrency with it before resuming its northwesterly track. SR 169 reaches its northern terminus at SR 51 in southern Opelika.

== Major intersections ==
County	Location	mi	km	Destinations	Notes
Russell	Seale	0.000	0.000	US 431 (SR 1) – Phenix City, Eufaula	Southern terminus
Russell	Crawford	9.705	15.619	US 80 east (SR 8) – Tuskegee	Southern end of US 80 concurrency
Russell	Crawford	10.248	16.493	US 80 west (SR 8) – Ladonia, Phenix City	Northern end of US 80 concurrency
Lee	Opelika	26.325	42.366	SR 51 (Marvyn Pike) to I-85 – Downtown, Hurtsboro	Northern terminus
1.000 mi = 1.609 km; 1.000 km = 0.621 mi: Concurrency terminus
