= Crawford, Russell County, Alabama =

Crawford, Alabama
- Unincorporated community
- Location within Alabama Location within the United States
- Coordinates: 32°27′25″N 85°11′23″W
- Country: United States
- State: Alabama
- County: Russell
- Elevation: 446 ft (136 m)
- Time zone: UTC-6 (Central (CST))
  - Summer (DST): UTC-5 (CDT)
- Area code: 334
- GNIS feature ID: 116821

Crawford is an unincorporated community in Russell County, Alabama, United States. Crawford is located at the junction of U.S. Route 80 and Alabama State Route 169, 6.5 miles (10.5 km) west of Ladonia. It was the second county seat of Russell County from 1839 to 1868 before it removed to Seale. Crawford had a record population of 3,276 in the 2021 Census. The CCD of Crawford is 84.3 square miles and has 38.9 people per square mile.

== History ==
=== Early years ===
Crawford was a thriving town through the 1840s and 1860s that held many stores, churches, and the popular Masonic Lodge. The town had many routes that connected several parts of neighboring location such as a stagecoach route that connected Clayton, Alabama as well as Salem, Alabama. Crawford was also the home of Russell County's first courthouse.

Crawford's Tuckabatcha Masonic Lodge was constructed in 1848. Throughout the years, the lodge has undergone several renovations and still stands near its original location. The Russell County Commission, Crawford citizens, and volunteers have contributed to its upkeep over the years.

=== The Civil War ===
The small town of Crawford had a key point in the American Civil War. Benjamin Baker, a Crawford citizen, was one of the signers of the Ordinance of Secession and was a key leader in the war.

Crawford was one of the very few southern cities in the war that did not get burned down. The 10th Missouri Regiment led by Major General James Wilson, marched their way through to Crawford just before Easter of 1865. Thanks to the cries of a woman from the Crawford Jail, all buildings with the exception of the jail were saved. The woman, who was imprisoned due to her voiced support of the Union, was imprisoned and held at the Girard Jail until being later transported to Crawford. She begged Major General Wilson to spare her town due to the citizen's support of her. Even one of Wilson's men plead for the Masonci Lodge to be spared. Wilson's men spared the town of Crawford and moved forward to Girard for what is widely believed to be the last land battle of the Civil War.

== Gallery ==
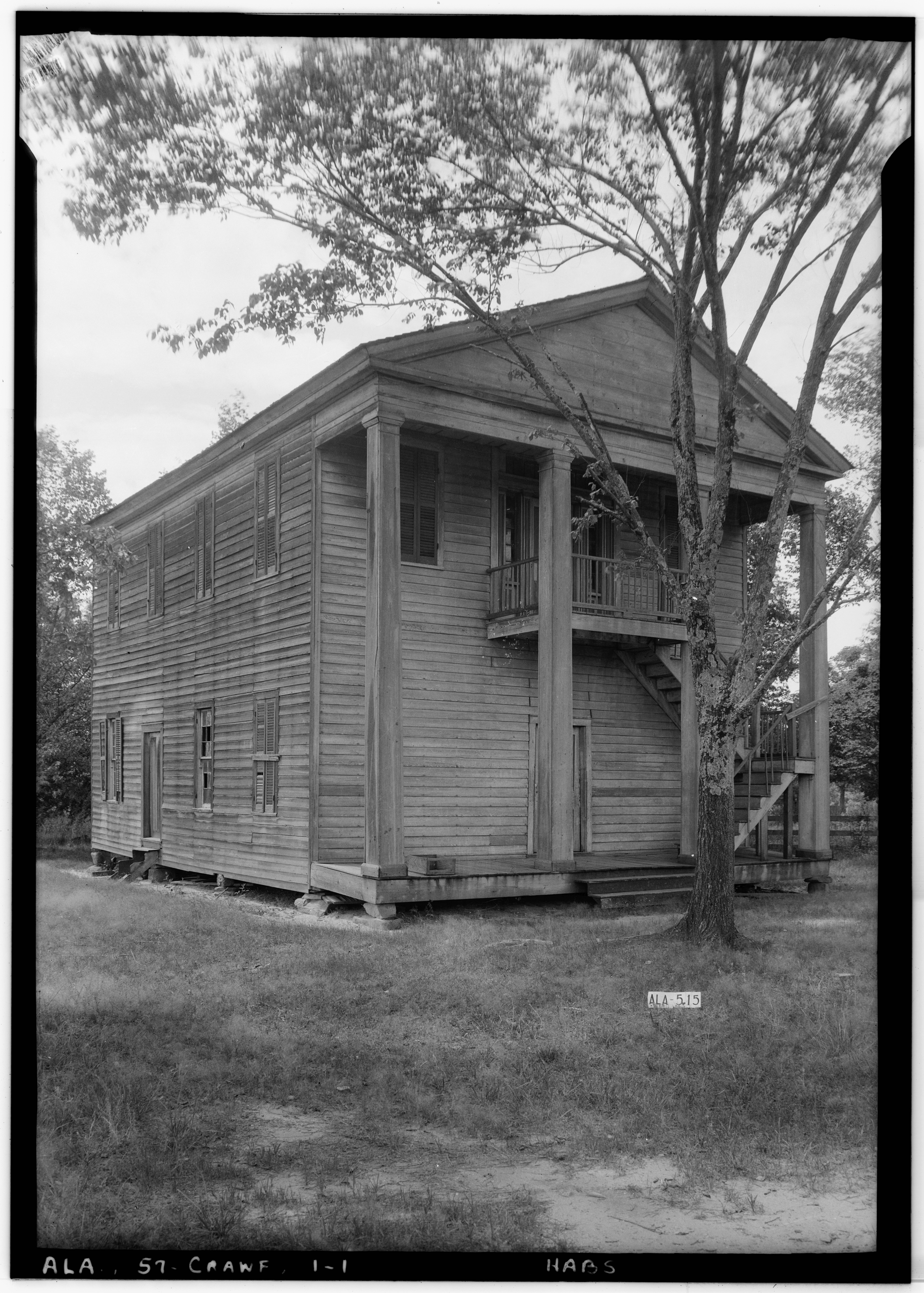
The Tuckabatcha Masonic Lodge No. 863 in Crawford. This photo was taken in 1935 as part of the Historic American Buildings Survey

== Demographics ==
Historical population
Census	Pop.	Note	%±
1860	187		—
1880	124		—
U.S. Decennial Census

Crawford was listed as an incorporated town on the 1860 U.S. Census when it was the Russell County Seat. It last appeared on the 1880 U.S. Census and has not appeared since. The median age in Crawford is 43.1, which is 20% higher than the Russell County average and 10% higher than the Alabama average. The community consists of about 53% female and 47% male.

About 8% of Crawford is below the poverty line. The per capita income for Crawford is $31,510, and the median household income is $69,091.
