= Alabama State Route 132 =

State highway in Alabama, United States

State Route 132

Route information
- Maintained by ALDOT
- Length: 17.438 mi (28.064 km)
- Existed: 1963–present

Major junctions
- West end: SR 75 in Oneonta
- East end: US 278 east of Walnut Grove

Location
- Country: United States
- State: Alabama
- Counties: Blount, Etowah

Highway system
- Alabama State Highway System; Interstate; US; State
← SR 131	→ SR 133

State Route 132 (SR 132) is an 17.438-mile-long (28.064 km) state highway in Blount and Etowah counties in the U.S. state of Alabama. The western terminus of the highway is at an intersection with SR 75 north of downtown Oneonta. The eastern terminus of the highway is at an intersection with U.S. Route 278 (US 278) east of Walnut Grove.

== Route description ==
SR 132 is a two-lane highway for its entire length. Its main purpose is to lead motorists from Oneonta to Attalla and Gadsden without travelling via SR 75 or US 231 and Interstate 59 (I-59). It travels in a generally northeastward trajectory as it heads from Oneonta and travels through rural Blount County. Altoona is the only town the highway travels through.

== Major intersections ==
County	Location	mi	km	Destinations	Notes
Blount	Oneonta	0.000	0.000	SR 75 – Birmingham, Guntersville	Western terminus
Etowah		17.438	28.064	US 278 (SR 74) – Cullman, Attalla, Gadsden	Eastern terminus
1.000 mi = 1.609 km; 1.000 km = 0.621 mi
