= Alabama State Route 204 =

State highway in Alabama, United States

State Route 204
- Rudy Abbott Highway

Route information
- Maintained by ALDOT
- Length: 9.620 mi (15.482 km)

Major junctions
- West end: US 431 in Crystal Springs
- East end: SR 21 in Jacksonville

Location
- Country: United States
- State: Alabama
- Counties: Calhoun

Highway system
- Alabama State Highway System; Interstate; US; State
| ← SR 203 | → SR 205 |

State Route 204 (SR 204) is a 9.620-mile (15.482 km) highway that runs from U.S. Route 431 (US 431) at Lawrence Springs (just north of Wellington) to SR 21 at Jacksonville. It is two lanes in its entirety.

== Route description ==
SR 204 travels through rural territory except in Jacksonville. It carries a 55 mph (89 km/h) speed limit until entering Jacksonville. This highway is often used by motorists who travel between Jacksonville and areas accessible by US 431, such as Gadsden.

Beginning at US 431 at Crystal Springs, a small water recreation park, the road makes a wide left-hand curve and then a sharp, 35 mph (56 km/h) right-hand curve just east of its western terminus. It then passes beneath a narrow, substandard railroad trestle after which an uphill curve takes the road past a former elementary school site. The road then goes straight until turning slightly right and passing a small church. It then straightens again when going past a marshy wooded area on the right and turns slightly left and uphill before passing a cemetery.

Angel Grove Baptist Church can be seen on the right before making a left turn while going downhill. There is a Chevron station at the caution light before going uphill and across a high bridge over a deep valley. After a slight right-hand turn, Pleasant Valley Road can be seen at the caution light. The road again straightens and passes West Point Baptist Church. It then crosses its final bridge while slightly turning left, then turns left again before a short straightaway leading past the Jacksonville Water Treatment Plant, where the speed limit drops to 45 mph (72 km/h).

The road then enters the Jacksonville city limits, where it becomes Nisbet Street and the speed limit drops to 35 mph (56 km/h) as it travels across the campus of Jacksonville State University, passing Rudy Abbott Field, Pete Mathews Coliseum, and two residence halls before ending at SR 21 (known as Pelham Road in Jacksonville). Bennett Boulevard continues off of SR 204 across Pelham Road and passes the JSU softball field and JSU's nursing school. Just prior to its terminus at SR 21 the road crosses the Chief Ladiga Trail which is an old railbed running northeast from Anniston to Piedmont and then eastward into Georgia where it becomes the Silver Comet Trail before terminating near Smyrna.

== Major intersections ==
The entire route is in Calhoun County.

| Location | mi | km | Destinations | Notes |
|---|---|---|---|---|
| Crystal Springs | 0.0 | 0.0 | US 431 (SR 1) – Anniston, Gadsden | Western terminus |
| Jacksonville | 9.620 | 15.482 | SR 21 (Pelham Road N) – Weaver, Piedmont | Eastern terminus |
1.000 mi = 1.609 km; 1.000 km = 0.621 mi
