= James Fischer =

American engineer

James Fischer (December 27, 1927 – July 3, 2004) was an American engineer, who developed high-purity silicon technology for Texas Instruments.

Born in Boaz, Alabama, Fischer grew up in Gentry, Arkansas. Fischer graduated from the University of Arkansas and the Massachusetts Institute of Technology. Hired by Texas Instruments in 1955, Fischer, with a master's degree in chemical engineering, worked with the technical staff on high-purity silicon, and helped develop the high-purity silicon manufacturing plant. In 1978, he became vice president of the company's worldwide semiconductor operations, and in 1980, became executive vice president of the company.

He retired from Texas Instruments in 1984 and died of cancer in 2004, in Richardson, Texas.
