= Douglas High School (Alabama) =

Location
- 225 Eagle Drive; Douglas, Alabama 35964; United States; 34°10′35″N 86°19′19″W

Information
- Type: Public
- Established: 1945
- School district: Marshall County Schools
- CEEB code: 010925
- Principal: Brian Sauls
- Faculty: 33.77 (on FTE basis)
- Grades: 9 – 12
- Enrollment: 720 (2025-2026)
- Student to teacher ratio: 20.46
- Colors: White, red and Grey
- Slogan: EAGLE PRIDE
- Mascot: Eagles
- Website: dhs.marshallk12.org

Douglas High School is a public high school located in Douglas, Alabama.The school offers lots of different clubs and activities. The Pride of Douglas Eagle Band has over 100+ members as of 2026 season. Currently, the school educates about 790 students in grades 9 to 12 in the Marshall County Schools.
