= Thomas A. Snellgrove Homestead =

Historic house in Alabama, United States

- U.S. National Register of Historic Places
- U.S. Historic district
- Alabama Register of Landmarks and Heritage
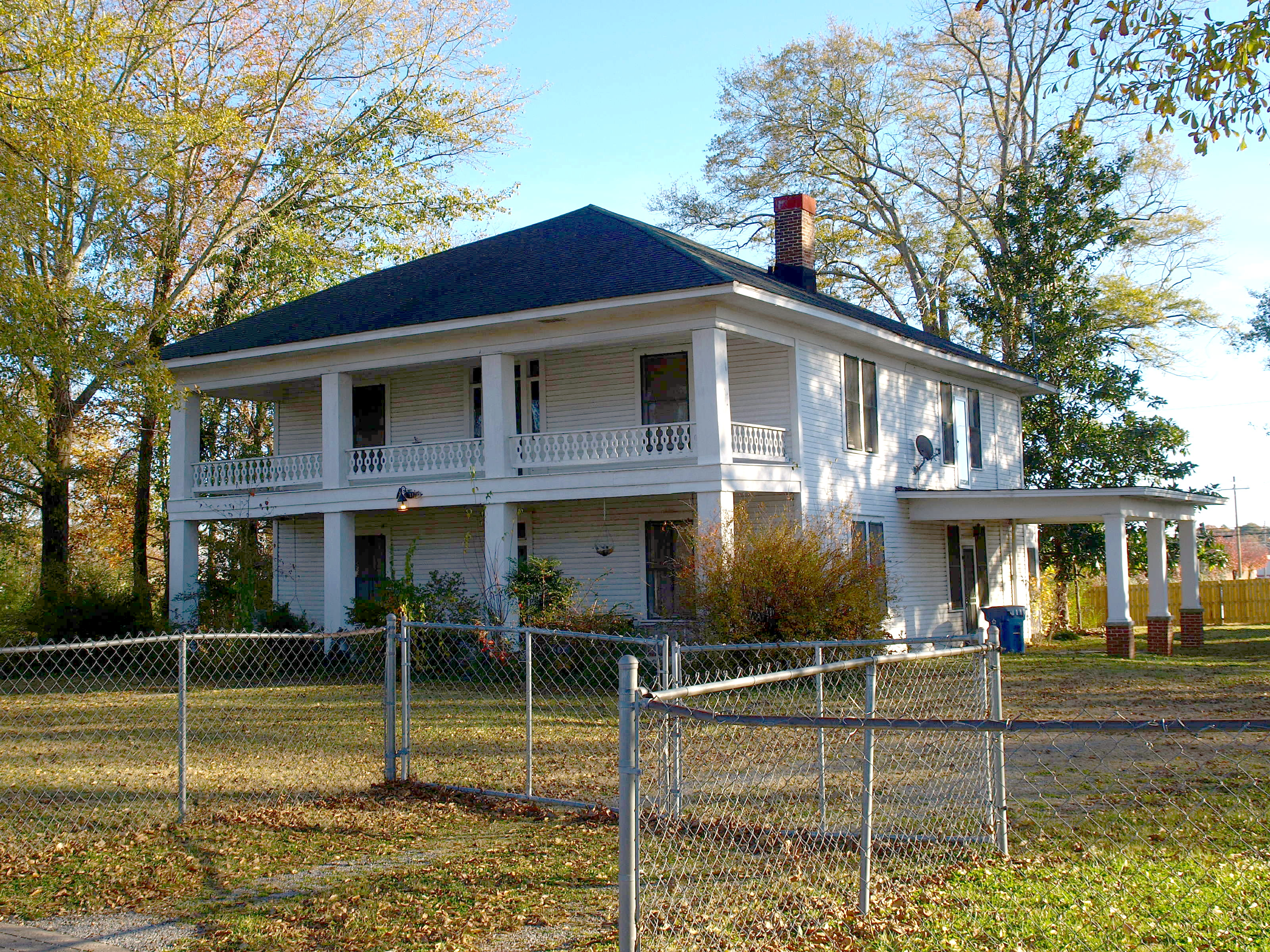
- The house in November 2017

- Location within Alabama Location within the United States
- Location: 5115 E. Mann Ave., 310 Mill Ave., Boaz, Alabama
- Coordinates: 34°11′57″N 86°9′34″W
- Area: 2.5 acres (1.0 ha)
- Built: 1900
- Architect: Thomas A. Snellgrove
- Architectural style: Greek Revival
- NRHP reference No.: 96000167

Significant dates
- Added to NRHP: February 23, 1996
- Designated ARLH: June 30, 1995

The Thomas A. Snellgrove Homestead (also known as the Snellgrove-Sparks Homestead) is a group of three historic residences and their outbuildings in Boaz, Alabama. The houses are the last remnants of the plantation settled by Billy Sparks in 1878. Sparks was one of the first white settlers in what is now Boaz. In 1886 the community was granted a post office and assumed its current name. Thomas A. Snellgrove married one of Sparks' granddaughters in 1895, and purchased the remnants of the plantation in 1898, one year after the town was incorporated.

Snellgrove built a two-story, Greek Revival house in 1900. The house has many vernacular features, including a two-level, full-width front porch. A one-story, gable roofed tenant's house was built behind the main house in 1915. In 1938, Snellgrove built an English-inspired cottage, with a large shed roofed dormer, for his daughter. The houses were listed on the Alabama Register of Landmarks and Heritage in 1995 and the National Register of Historic Places in 1996.
