= Boaz City School District =

School district in Alabama, United States

Address
- 126 Newt Parker Drive Boaz, Alabama, 35957; United States

District information
- Type: Public
- Grades: PreK–12
- Superintendent: G. Todd Haynie
- NCES District ID: 0100012

Students and staff
- Students: 2,431
- Teachers: 135.4
- Staff: 105.8
- Student–teacher ratio: 17.95

Other information
- Website: www.boazk12.org

Boaz City School District is a school district in Marshall and Etowah counties, Alabama, serving the city of Boaz. It operates five schools: Corley Elementary School, Boaz Elementary School, Boaz Intermediate School, Boaz Middle School, and Boaz High School. As of the 2017–2018 school year, the district had a student population of 2279 and employed 18 administrators, 154 faculty members and 93 non-faculty staff members.

== Schools ==
Boaz Elementary teaches Pre-K, Kindergarten and 1st grade. Once students move into 2nd and 3rd grade they attend Corley Elementary and Boaz Intermediate School for 4th and 5th grade. The schools are free to attend for families who reside within the city limits. Those who wish for their children to attend the schools but live outside the city limits must pay $250 per child per school year, not to exceed $600 per household.
