= Georgia State Route 301 =

Highway in Georgia, United States

State Route 301
- SR 301 highlighted in red

Route information
- Maintained by GDOT
- Length: 10.3 mi (16.6 km)

Major junctions
- South end: SR 75 at the Alabama state line southwest of Trenton
- SR 136 in Gass
- North end: CR 90 at the Alabama state line northwest of Trenton

Location
- Country: United States
- State: Georgia
- Counties: Dade

Highway system
- Georgia State Highway System; Interstate; US; State; Special
← US 301	→ SR 302

State Route 301 (SR 301) is a south-north state highway located in the northwestern corner of the U.S. state of Georgia. Its route is entirely within Dade County.

== Route description ==
SR 301 begins at the Alabama state line southwest of Trenton, where the roadway continues as Alabama State Route 75. The route heads northeast to an intersection with SR 136 in Gass. The highway continues heading northeast, before curving back to the northwest. It continues heading northwest, until it meets its northern terminus, a second encounter with the Alabama state line, where the roadway continues as Jackson County Road 90. The route's entire length is atop Sand Mountain.

== Major intersections ==
The entire route is in Dade County.

Location	mi	km	Destinations	Notes
	0.0	0.0	SR 75 south – Ider, Ala	Continuation beyond Alabama state line
Gass	3.2	5.1	SR 136 – Higdon Ala, Trenton	
	10.3	16.6	CR 90 west – Bryant, Ala	Continuation beyond Alabama state line
1.000 mi = 1.609 km; 1.000 km = 0.621 mi
