= Julia Street Memorial United Methodist Church =

Historic church in Alabama, United States

- U.S. National Register of Historic Places
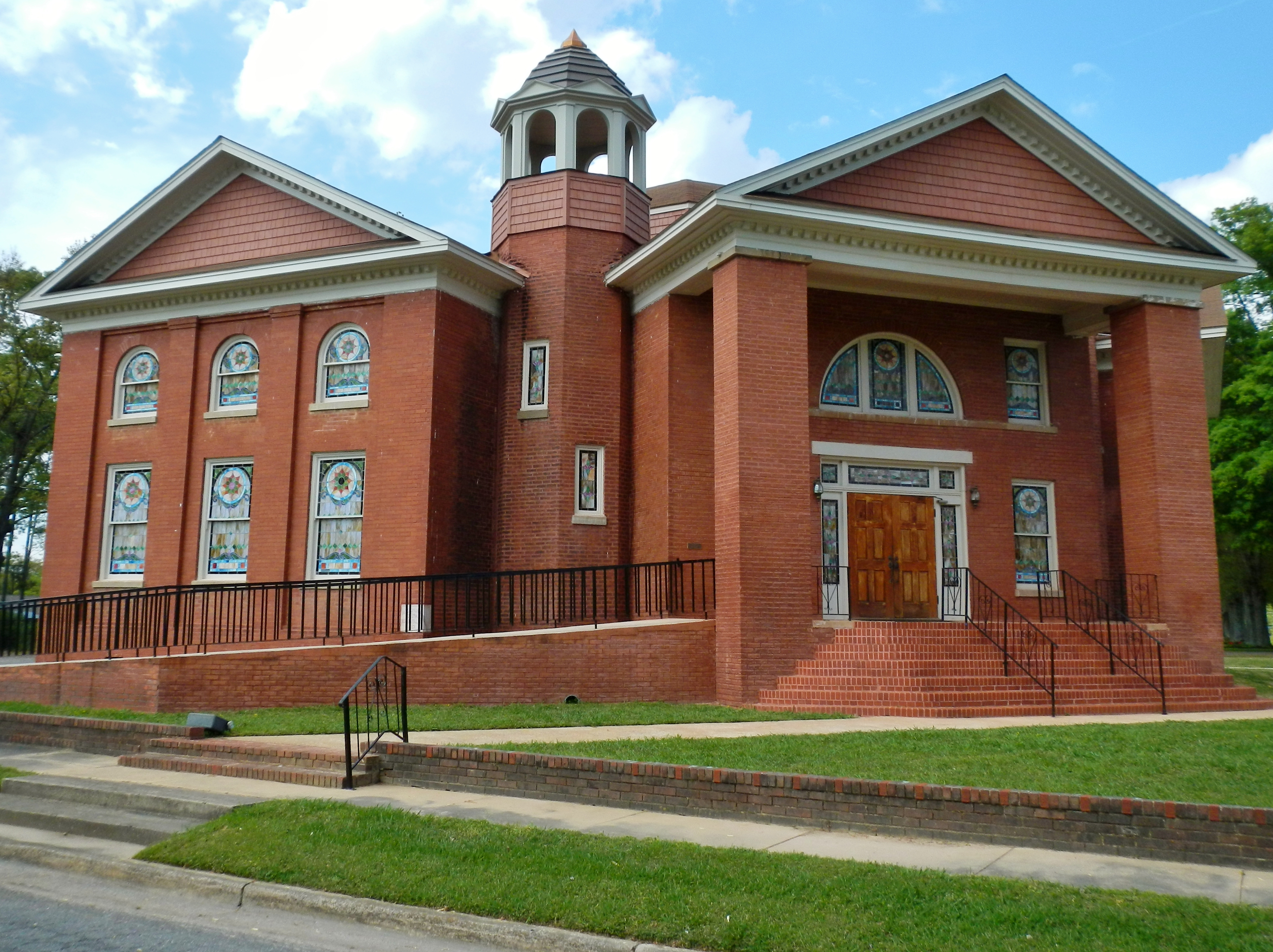

- Location within Alabama Location within the United States
- Location: 302 Thomas Ave., Boaz, Alabama
- Coordinates: 34°12′4″N 86°9′44″W
- Area: 1 acre (0.40 ha)
- Built: 1917
- Built by: E.W. Clotfelter
- Architectural style: Classical Revival
- NRHP reference No.: 99000855
- Added to NRHP: July 22, 1999

The Julia Street Memorial United Methodist Church is a historic church at 302 Thomas Avenue in Boaz, Alabama. It was built in 1917 in a Classical Revival style and was added to the National Register of Historic Places in 1999.
