= Marshall County Schools (Alabama) =

School district serving Marshall County, Alabama, U.S.

Coordinates: 34°18′18.7″N 86°17′14.93″W

Marshall County Schools consists of public schools serving Marshall County, Alabama. Albertville, Arab, Boaz, and Guntersville have independent city-ran schools.

The current superintendent of this school is Dr. Cindy Wigley, who took office in January 2015.

== Member schools ==
- Asbury High School
- Brindlee Mountain Middle School
- Brindlee Mountain High School
- Claysville Junior High School
- Kate Duncan Smith DAR School
- Douglas Elementary School
- Douglas Middle School
- Douglas High School
- Grassy Elementary School
- Marshall County Alternative School
- Marshall Technical School
- Sloman Primary School
- Union Grove Elementary School
