= Seale, Alabama =

- Unincorporated community
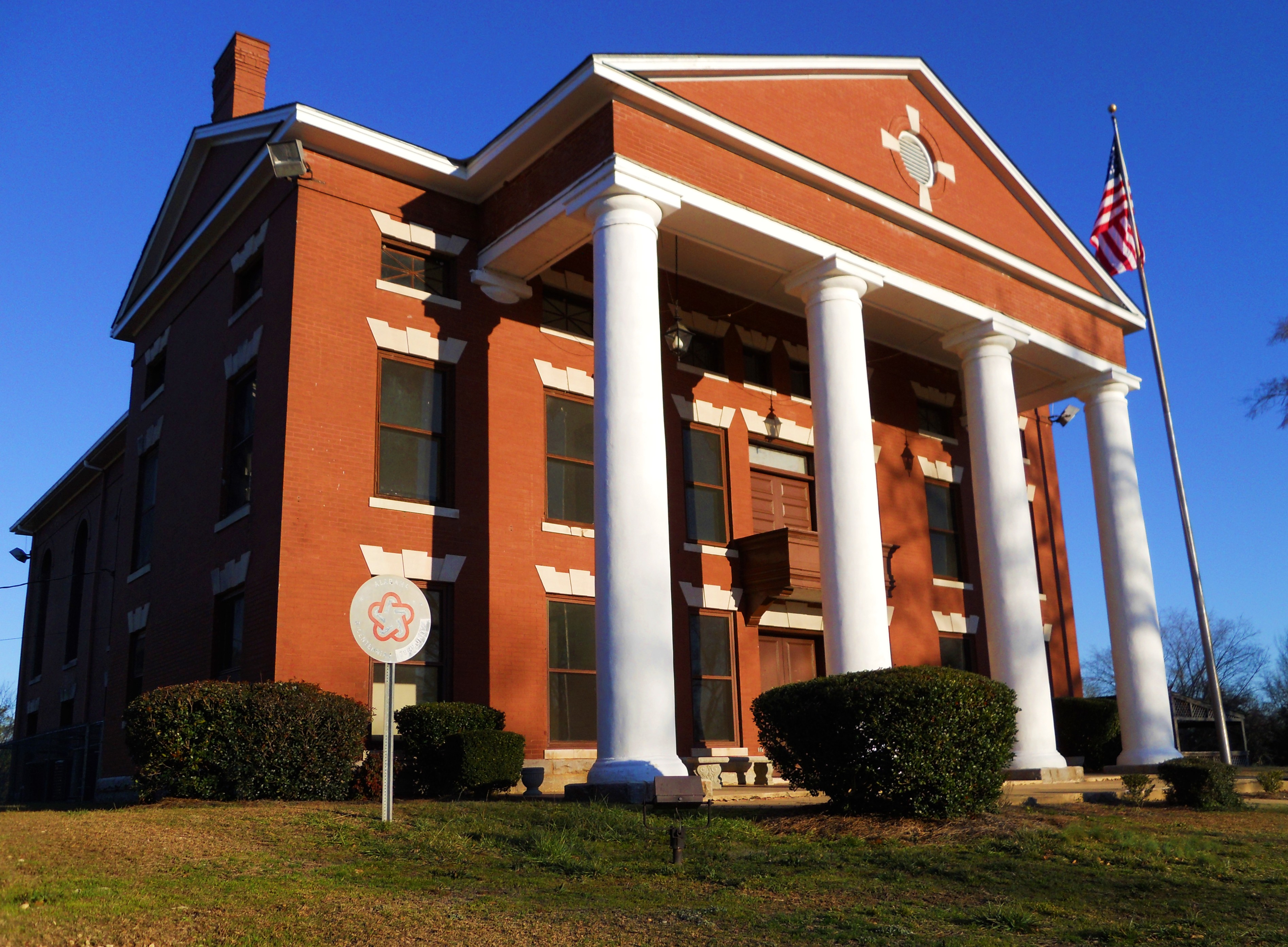
- The Old Russell County Courthouse

- Location within Alabama Location within the United States
- Coordinates: 32°17′51″N 85°10′08″W
- Country: United States
- State: Alabama
- County: Russell
- Elevation: 341 ft (104 m)
- Time zone: UTC-6 (Central (CST))
  - Summer (DST): UTC-5 (CDT)
- Area code: 334
- GNIS feature ID: 153358

Seale is an unincorporated community in Russell County, Alabama, United States. It was the county seat from 1868 until 1935, and is currently home to Russell County High School and middle school. The former Russell County courthouse, built in 1868, is located in the town.

== History ==
Before the town of Seale was ever established, settlers from Georgia began to build settlements in this area of Russell County due to its proximity to the Old Federal Road. As early as 1842, there was a community present here which attended a "preaching place" known as Glenn Chapel. Seale itself was originally an unincorporated community known as Silver Run, established sometime in the early 1850s. The town was formed, in part, to facilitate a railroad being built between Girard and Mobile. The station in Silver Run was named Seale's Station, in honor of Captain Arnold Seale. Accordingly, the town eventually changed its name to Seale.

Seale was initially an incorporated community, by an act of the state legislature in 1872, and also the third county seat, succeeding Crawford during the Reconstruction Era in 1868. After the merger of Girard and Phenix City in the 1920s, there was pressure to relocate the county seat to the much more populous Phenix City. In 1926, Phenix City served jointly with Seale as the county seat. Less than a decade later, around 1935, the seat was moved permanently to Phenix City.

By 1950, its main product was turpentine. The turpentine business is no longer in operation. From its establishment to present day, it is a rural farm and cattle community. At some point after 1950, Seale either disincorporated or lost its charter, and has remained unincorporated since.

During the 1960s a lot of military personnel assigned to Ft. Benning and deployed to South Vietnam during the Vietnam War settled there and brought with them a new generation. The small school of Chavala swelled with students during that period. The Court House that is of historical value, lay unoccupied and in bad need of repair during that period. In the years since, it has been restored and remains the centerpiece of the community, hosting events and weddings. Every Labor Day, a fair is organized at the old courthouse to help raise money for its upkeep.

== Demographics ==
Historical population
Census	Pop.	Note	%±
1880	257		—
1890	299		16.3%
1900	386		29.1%
1910	312		−19.2%
1920	316		1.3%
1930	335		6.0%
1940	289		−13.7%
1950	343		18.7%
U.S. Decennial Census

From 1880 to 1950 Seale appeared on the U.S. Census records. It had a fairly stable population for most of the period, reaching a zenith of 386 residents in 1900 when it was the county seat. After 1950, it either disincorporated or lost its charter, and has not appeared on the census since.

The population for ZIP Code 36875 as of 2010, which includes Seale and environs, was 4,622.

== Geography ==
Seale is located in southeastern Alabama along U.S. Route 431 and Alabama State Route 26 in the rural central portion of Russell County. U.S. 431 leads northeast 17 mi (27 km) to Phenix City, the Russell County seat, and south 30 mi (48 km) north to Eufaula. AL-26 begins in the community and leads southwest 16 mi (26 km) to Hurtsboro.

== Attractions ==
At the Drive-Thru Museum you can see local folk art, antiques, and curios .

At the Museum Of Wonder a former taxidermist has turned his old shop into a folk art museum.

== Gallery ==
Below are photographs taken in Seale as part of the Historic American Buildings Survey:

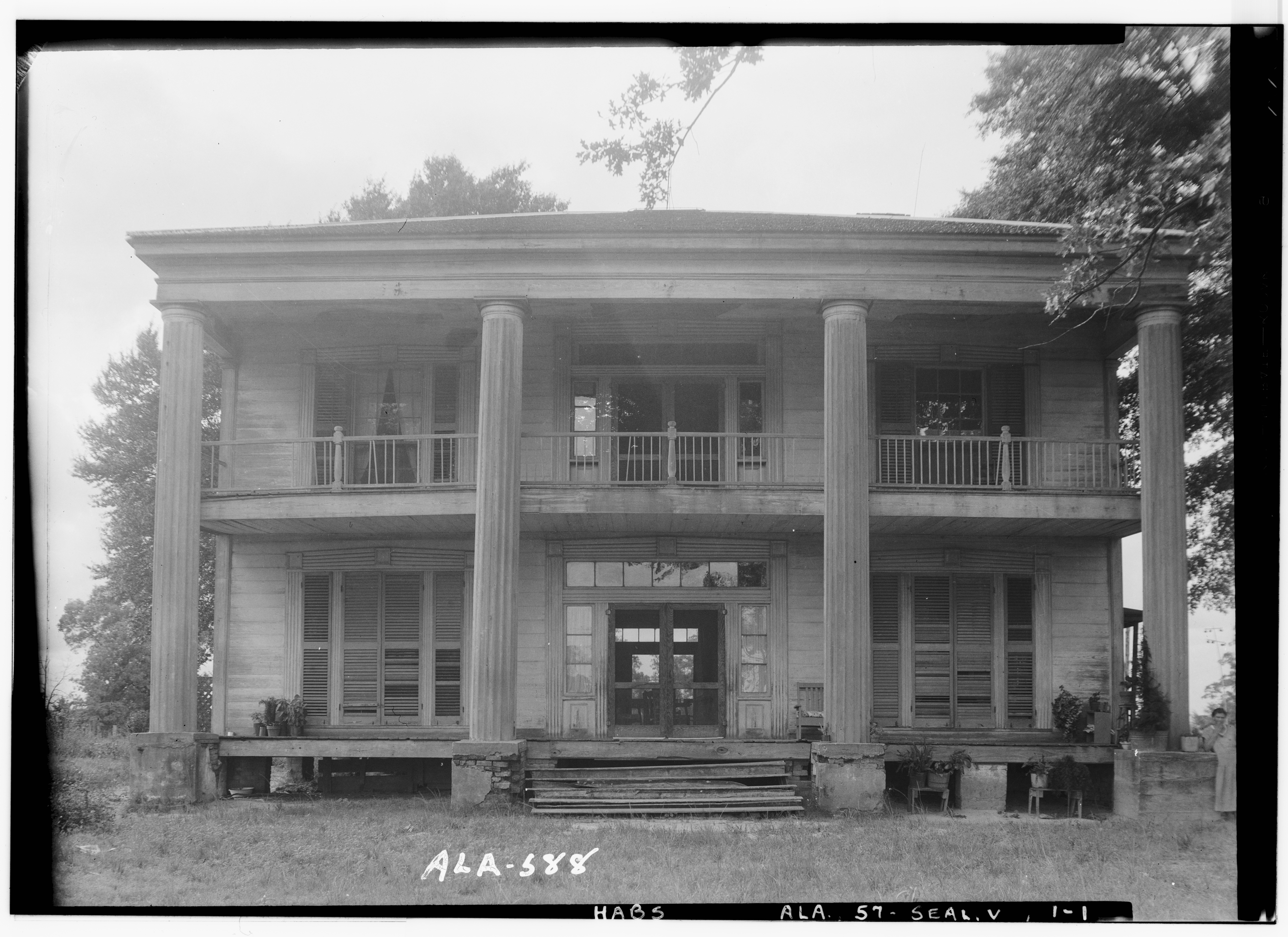
Bass-Perry House

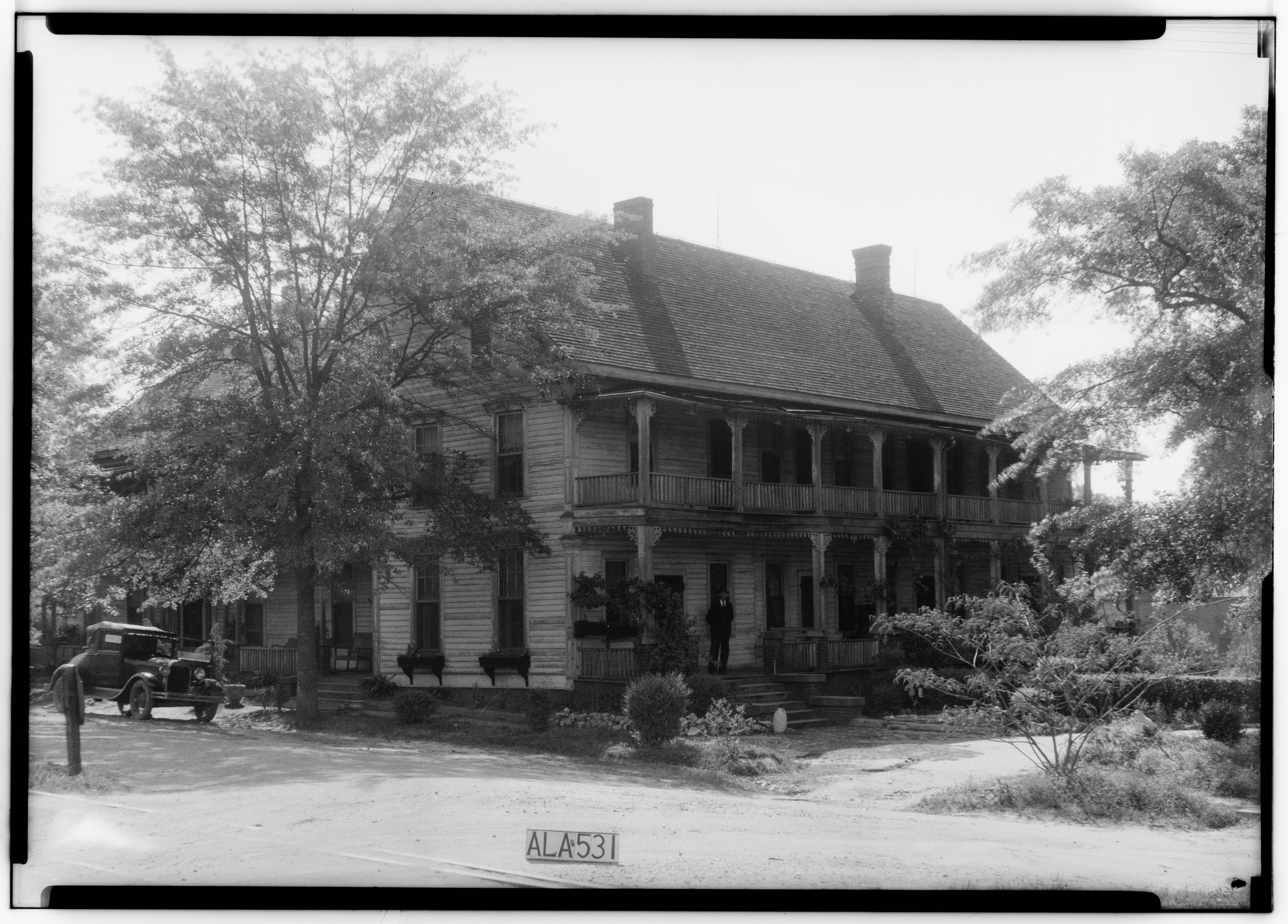
Dudley's Hotel
