= Altoona, Alabama =

Altoona
- Town
- Location of Altoona in Blount County and Etowah County, Alabama.
- Coordinates: 34°1′51″N 86°19′5″W
- Country: United States
- State: Alabama
- Counties: Etowah, Blount
- Established: 1908

Government
  - Type: Mayor-Council
  - Mayor: Lisa Dover

Area
  - Total: 4.49 sq mi (11.63 km^{2})
  - Land: 4.48 sq mi (11.60 km^{2})
  - Water: 0.012 sq mi (0.03 km^{2})
- Elevation: 942 ft (287 m)

Population (2020)
  - Total: 948
  - Density: 212/sq mi (81.7/km^{2})
- Time zone: UTC-6 (CST)
  - Summer (DST): UTC-5 (CDT)
- ZIP code: 35952
- Area codes: 205, 659
- FIPS code: 01-01660
- GNIS feature ID: 2405146

Altoona is a town in Etowah County (and a small portion of Blount County) in the U.S. state of Alabama. It is part of the Gadsden Metropolitan Statistical Area. At the 2020 census, the population was 948.

== History ==
Altoona had its start in the year 1900 as a mining town, and was named for another coal town, Altoona, Pennsylvania. A post office has been in operation at Altoona since 1900. It incorporated in 1908.

== Geography ==
Altoona is located in western Etowah County. The town extends west into Blount County. It is located in the Murphree Valley at the base of Altoona Mountain. Straight Mountain is a small, narrow ridge which runs nearly through the center of the town. Alabama State Route 132 (Main Street) leads southwest 10 miles (16 km) to Oneonta, the Blount County seat, and northeast towards Gadsden via U.S. Route 278.

According to the U.S. Census Bureau, the town has a total area of 4.3 square miles (11.2 km^{2}), of which 0.012 square miles (0.03 km^{2}), or 0.23%, is water.

== Demographics ==
Historical population
Census	Pop.	Note	%±
1910	1,071		—
1920	1,078		0.7%
1930	1,098		1.9%
1940	995		−9.4%
1950	860		−13.6%
1960	744		−13.5%
1970	781		5.0%
1980	928		18.8%
1990	960		3.4%
2000	984		2.5%
2010	933		−5.2%
2020	948		1.6%
U.S. Decennial Census

Altoona first appeared on the 1910 U.S. Census as an incorporated town. See also Altoona precinct/division below.

=== 2000 Census data ===
As of the census of 2000, there were 984 people, 397 households, and 271 families residing in the town. The population density was 258.7 inhabitants per square mile (99.9/km^{2}). There were 437 housing units at an average density of 114.9 per square mile (44.4/km^{2}). The racial makeup of the town was 95.43% White, 2.54% Black or African American, 0.10% Native American, 0.91% from other races, and 1.02% from two or more races. 2.54% of the population were Hispanic or Latino of any race.

There were 397 households, out of which 33.8% had children under the age of 18 living with them, 47.9% were married couples living together, 15.6% had a female householder with no husband present, and 31.5% were non-families. 29.2% of all households were made up of individuals, and 13.1% had someone living alone who was 65 years of age or older. The average household size was 2.36 and the average family size was 2.89.

In the town, the population was spread out, with 25.5% under the age of 18, 8.2% from 18 to 24, 26.3% from 25 to 44, 22.6% from 45 to 64, and 17.4% who were 65 years of age or older. The median age was 38 years. For every 100 females, there were 78.6 males. For every 100 females age 18 and over, there were 79.2 males.

The median income for a household in the town was $20,469, and the median income for a family was $28,750. Males had a median income of $30,250 versus $22,344 for females. The per capita income for the town was $11,168. About 21.8% of families and 27.2% of the population were below the poverty line, including 39.3% of those under age 18 and 16.3% of those age 65 or over.

== Altoona Precinct/Division (1910-) ==
Historical population
Census	Pop.	Note	%±
1910	1,158		—
1920	1,202		3.8%
1930	1,316		9.5%
1940	1,187		−9.8%
1950	1,014		−14.6%
1960	3,661		261.0%
1970	3,401		−7.1%
1980	3,976		16.9%
1990	4,390		10.4%
2000	5,127		16.8%
2010	5,302		3.4%
U.S. Decennial Census

Altoona Precinct (Etowah County 32nd Precinct) first appeared on the 1910 U.S. Census. In 1960, it was changed to the Altoona Census Division as part of a general reorganization of counties. The census division only includes the Etowah County portion of the town of Altoona. The Blount County portion is in the Clarence Census Division.
