= Snead, Alabama =

Sneed, Alabama
- Town
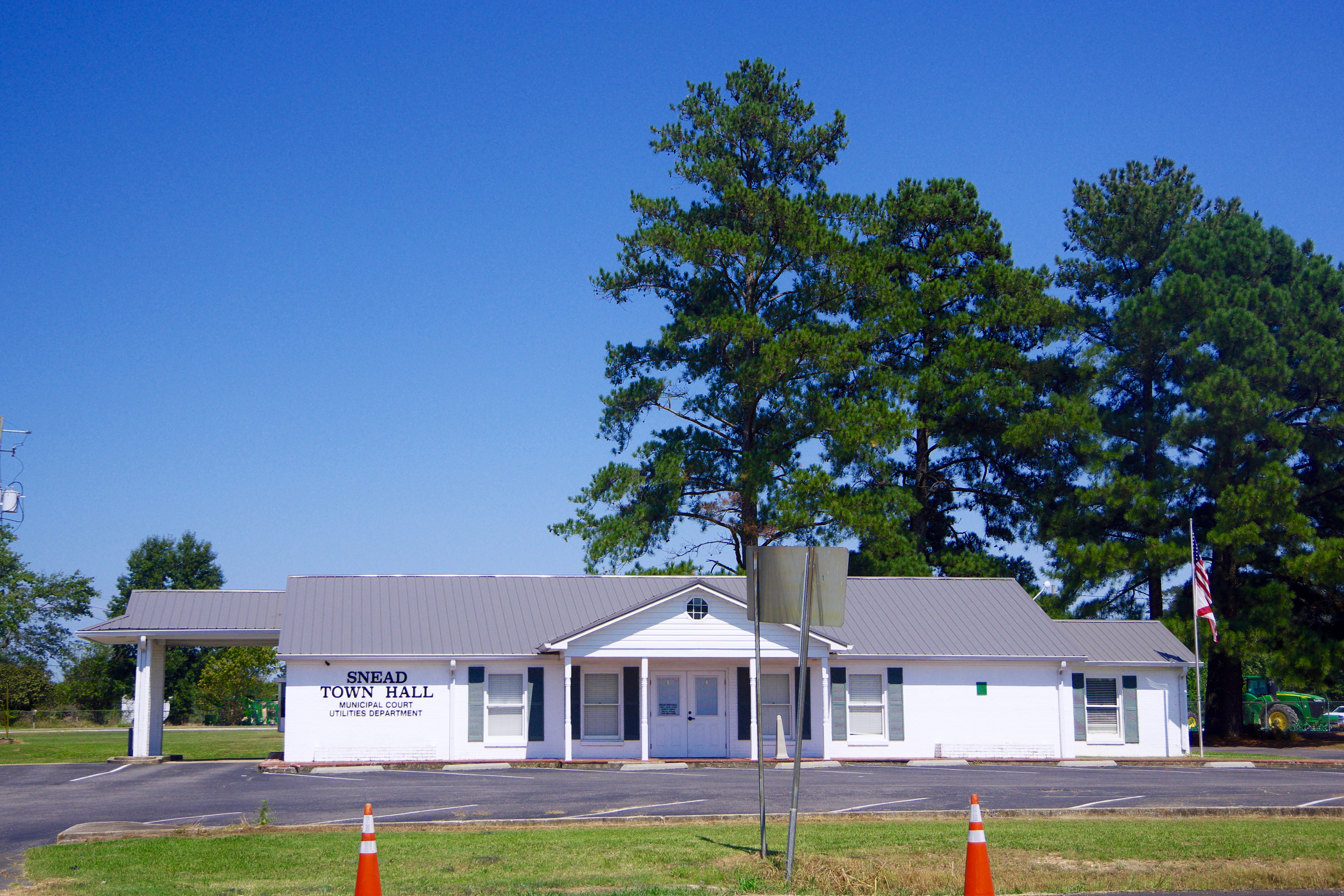
- Town Hall

- Location of Snead in Blount County, Alabama.
- Coordinates: 34°06′57″N 86°23′25″W
- Country: United States
- State: Alabama
- County: Blount

Area
  - Total: 5.54 sq mi (14.34 km^{2})
  - Land: 5.52 sq mi (14.30 km^{2})
  - Water: 0.019 sq mi (0.05 km^{2})
- Elevation: 794 ft (242 m)

Population (2020)
  - Total: 1,032
  - Density: 187.0/sq mi (72.19/km^{2})
- Time zone: UTC-6 (Central)
  - Summer (DST): UTC-5 (CDT)
- FIPS code: 01-71280
- GNIS feature ID: 2407358

Snead is a town in Blount County, Alabama, United States. At the 2020 census, the population was 1,032.

== History ==
First settled in 1839, what is now Snead began to expand in the 1850s when local businessman G.W. White built a gristmill on the nearby Black Warrior River. The town is named for John Snead, who became its first postmaster in 1882 (Snead State Community College in nearby Boaz is also named for John Snead). The Town of Snead incorporated in 1966.

== Geography ==
Snead is centered on the crossroads of U.S. Route 278 and Alabama State Route 75. US-278 leads east 26 miles (42 km) to Gadsden and west 27 miles (43 km) to Cullman. Highway 75 leads northeast 15 miles (24 km) to Albertville and 14 miles (23 km) southwest to Oneonta, the Blount County seat.

The town is bordered to the northeast by the Locust Fork of the Black Warrior River.

According to the U.S. Census Bureau, the town has a total area of 5.3 square miles (13.7 km^{2}), of which 5.3 square miles (13.6 km^{2}) is land and 0.019 square miles (0.05 km^{2}), or 0.36%, is water.

== Demographics ==
Historical population
Census	Pop.	Note	%±
1970	347		—
1980	667		92.2%
1990	632		−5.2%
2000	748		18.4%
2010	835		11.6%
2020	1,032		23.6%
U.S. Decennial Census; 2013 Estimate

=== 2020 census ===
As of the 2020 census, Snead had a population of 1,032. The median age was 38.8 years. 23.4% of residents were under the age of 18 and 20.8% of residents were 65 years of age or older. For every 100 females, there were 88.0 males, and for every 100 females age 18 and over, there were 87.2 males age 18 and over.

0.0% of residents lived in urban areas, while 100.0% lived in rural areas.

There were 453 households in Snead, of which 28.0% had children under the age of 18 living in them. Of all households, 44.4% were married-couple households, 18.8% were households with a male householder and no spouse or partner present, and 32.5% were households with a female householder and no spouse or partner present. About 31.6% of all households were made up of individuals, and 18.8% had someone living alone who was 65 years of age or older.

There were 487 housing units, of which 7.0% were vacant. The homeowner vacancy rate was 0.0% and the rental vacancy rate was 6.6%.

Snead racial composition
Race	Num.	Perc.
White (non-Hispanic)	875	84.79%
Black or African American (non-Hispanic)	6	0.58%
Native American	7	0.68%
Asian	2	0.19%
Other/Mixed	28	2.71%
Hispanic or Latino	114	11.05%

=== 2010 census ===
As of the census of 2010, there were 835 people, 374 households, and 233 families residing in the town. The population density was 154.6 inhabitants per square mile (59.7/km^{2}). There were 415 housing units at an average density of 76.85 per square mile (29.67/km^{2}). The racial makeup of the town was 96.8% White, 0.1% Asian, 0.1% African American, 0.5% Native American, 0.8% from some other race, and 1.7% from two or more races. 1.8% of the population were Hispanic or Latino of any race.

There were 374 households, out of which 25.1% had children under the age of 18 living with them, 51.9% were married couples living together, 8.0% had a female householder with no husband present, and 37.7% were non-families. 35.8% of all households were made up of individuals, and 19.8% had someone living alone who was 65 years of age or older. The average household size was 2.23 and the average family size was 2.9.

In the town, the age distribution of the population shows 22.6% under the age of 18, 5.9% from 18 to 24, 23.0% from 25 to 44, 25.9% from 45 to 64, and 22.6% who were 65 years of age or older. The median age was 43.8 years. For every 100 females, there were 85.1 males. For every 100 females age 18 and over, there were 82.4 males.

The median income for a household in the town was $36,029, and the median income for a family was $41,563. Males had a median income of $23,558 versus $13,799 for females. The per capita income for the town was $15,891. About 9.8% of families and 15.0% of the population were below the poverty line, including 15.8% of those under age 18 and 20.2% of those age 65 or over.
