= Walnut Grove, Alabama =

- Town
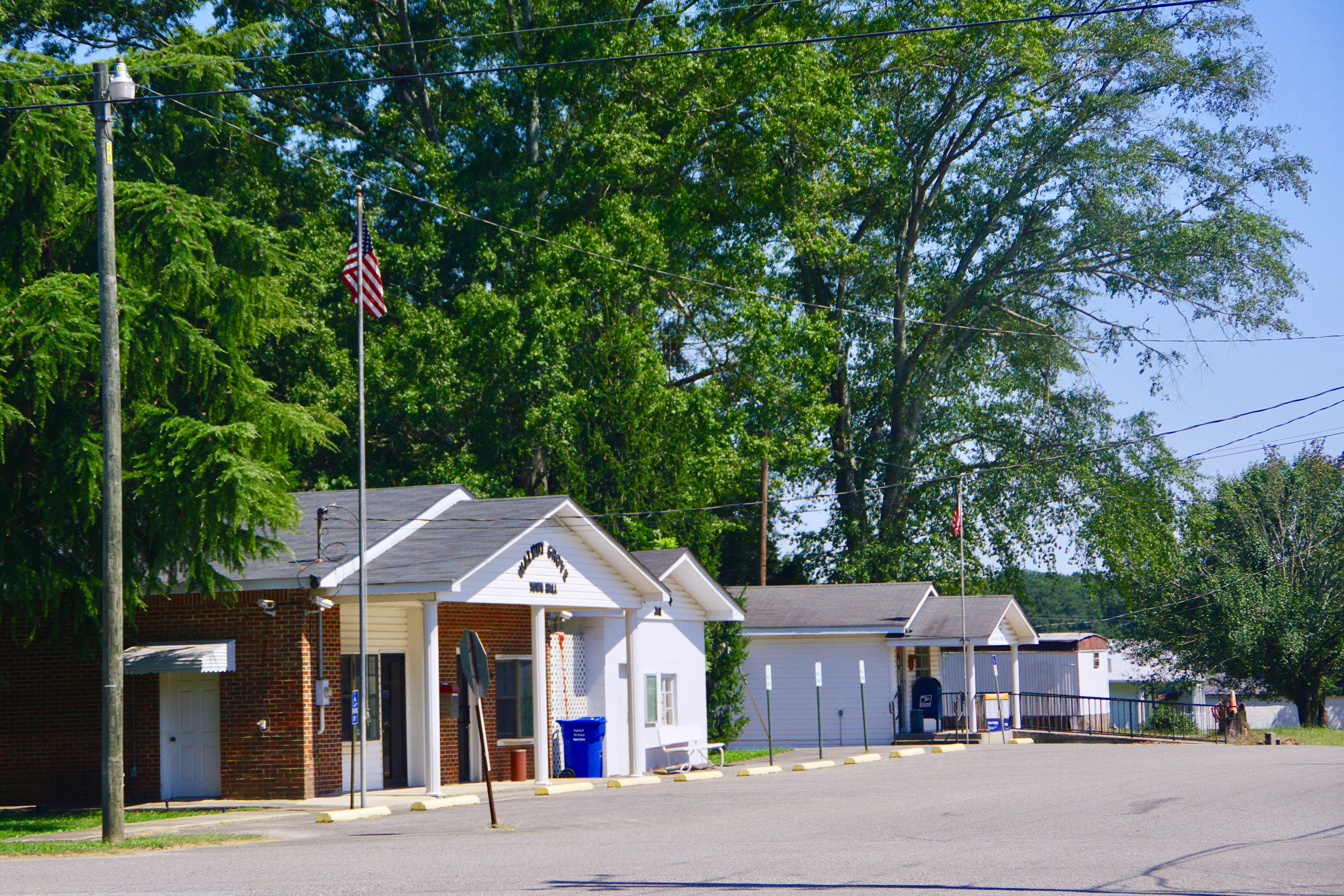
- Gadsden-Blountsville Rd.

- Location of Walnut Grove in Etowah County, Alabama.
- Coordinates: 34°03′20″N 86°15′45″W
- Country: United States
- State: Alabama
- County: Etowah

Area
  - Total: 5.04 sq mi (13.05 km^{2})
  - Land: 5.03 sq mi (13.02 km^{2})
  - Water: 0.012 sq mi (0.03 km^{2})
- Elevation: 830 ft (250 m)

Population (2020)
  - Total: 773
  - Density: 153.8/sq mi (59.37/km^{2})
- Time zone: UTC-6 (Central (CST))
  - Summer (DST): UTC-5 (CDT)
- ZIP code: 35990
- Area codes: 205, 659
- FIPS code: 01-79728
- GNIS feature ID: 2406827

Walnut Grove is a town in Etowah County, Alabama, United States. It is part of the Gadsden Metropolitan Statistical Area. As of the 2020 census, Walnut Grove had a population of 773.

== History ==
Walnut Grove was part of Blount County before it was included in Baine County (now Etowah) in 1866. Walnut Grove was settled by the Battles family in 1813, the Morton family, and the Carnes family (namesake of the Carnes Chapel area near the ghost town of Bennettsville off of US 278) in 1823. Around 1825, the town was known as "Thomas Crossroads", after landowner Jordan D. Thomas. In 1848, the town was named "Cornelius", after postmaster Harvey Cornelius. In 1849, it was renamed "Walnut Grove".

Walnut Grove was burned during the Civil War.

The first college preparatory school for males and females in northeast Alabama was established by act of Legislature in 1884. The Walnut Grove College ran for 15 years, and during the college's peak the town had grown to have 13 stores, including a drug store with a soda fountain. The Walnut Grove College closed in 1899 as high schools were being established in Etowah County.

The town was incorporated in 1886, with Colonel W.T Murphree as the first mayor.

In 1917, the finest grade of magnesium was discovered near Silver Gap at Red Mountain, at the western edge of town. The magnesium was mined and refined by Bessemer Mills in Birmingham and Eastman Corporation in Kingsport, Tennessee, in the 1930s and 1940s.

== Geography ==
Walnut Grove is located in western Etowah County. It is bordered to the south by the town of Altoona and to the west by Blount County. U.S. Route 278 passes through the town, leading east 19 miles (31 km) to Gadsden, the Etowah County seat, and west 33 miles (53 km) to Cullman.

According to the U.S. Census Bureau, Walnut Grove has a total area of 5.0 square miles (13.0 km^{2}), of which 0.01 square miles (0.03 km^{2}), or 0.24%, is water.

== Demographics ==
Historical population
Census	Pop.	Note	%±
1880	126		—
1900	251		—
1910	204		−18.7%
1920	167		−18.1%
1930	216		29.3%
1940	206		−4.6%
1950	222		7.8%
1960	237		6.8%
1970	224		−5.5%
1980	510		127.7%
1990	717		40.6%
2000	710		−1.0%
2010	698		−1.7%
2020	773		10.7%
U.S. Decennial Census

As of the census of 2000, there were 710 people, 273 households, and 209 families residing in the town. The population density was 141.7 inhabitants per square mile (54.7/km^{2}). There were 294 housing units at an average density of 58.7 per square mile (22.7/km^{2}). The racial makeup of the town was 98.31% White, 0.14% Native American, 0.14% Asian, and 1.41% from two or more races. 0.42% of the population were Hispanic or Latino of any race.

There were 273 households, out of which 39.9% had children under the age of 18 living with them, 57.9% were married couples living together, 13.2% had a female householder with no husband present, and 23.1% were non-families. 21.6% of all households were made up of individuals, and 9.2% had someone living alone who was 65 years of age or older. The average household size was 2.60 and the average family size was 3.02.

In the town, the population was spread out, with 30.1% under the age of 18, 8.2% from 18 to 24, 27.7% from 25 to 44, 25.2% from 45 to 64, and 8.7% who were 65 years of age or older. The median age was 34 years. For every 100 females, there were 94.0 males. For every 100 females age 18 and over, there were 90.0 males.

The median income for a household in the town was $26,688, and the median income for a family was $29,519. Males had a median income of $25,982 versus $17,279 for females. The per capita income for the town was $12,372. About 15.3% of families and 17.4% of the population were below the poverty line, including 19.9% of those under age 18 and 17.5% of those age 65 or over.

== Climate ==
The climate in this area is characterized by hot, humid summers and generally mild to cool winters. According to the Köppen Climate Classification system, Walnut Grove has a humid subtropical climate, abbreviated "Cfa" on climate maps.

On March 13, 1993, Walnut Grove set the record for the highest 24-hour snowfall recorded in Alabama at 20 inches (50.8 cm).

Climate data for Walnut Grove, Alabama, 1991–2020 normals
Month	Jan	Feb	Mar	Apr	May	Jun	Jul	Aug	Sep	Oct	Nov	Dec	Year
Average precipitation inches (mm)	5.76 (146)	5.63 (143)	5.79 (147)	5.35 (136)	4.75 (121)	5.50 (140)	4.00 (102)	4.38 (111)	4.27 (108)	3.45 (88)	4.05 (103)	5.90 (150)	58.83 (1,495)
Average snowfall inches (cm)	0.3 (0.76)	0.0 (0.0)	1.4 (3.6)	0.0 (0.0)	0.0 (0.0)	0.0 (0.0)	0.0 (0.0)	0.0 (0.0)	0.0 (0.0)	0.0 (0.0)	0.0 (0.0)	0.0 (0.0)	1.7 (4.36)
Average precipitation days (≥ 0.01 in)	9.3	9.7	10.2	8.7	9.7	10.2	10.3	9.0	6.2	6.3	7.7	10.3	107.6
Average snowy days (≥ 0.1 in)	0.1	0.0	0.1	0.0	0.0	0.0	0.0	0.0	0.0	0.0	0.0	0.0	0.2
Source: NOAA
