= Ladonia, Alabama =

Unincorporated community in the United States

- Census-designated place (CDP) & Unincorporated community
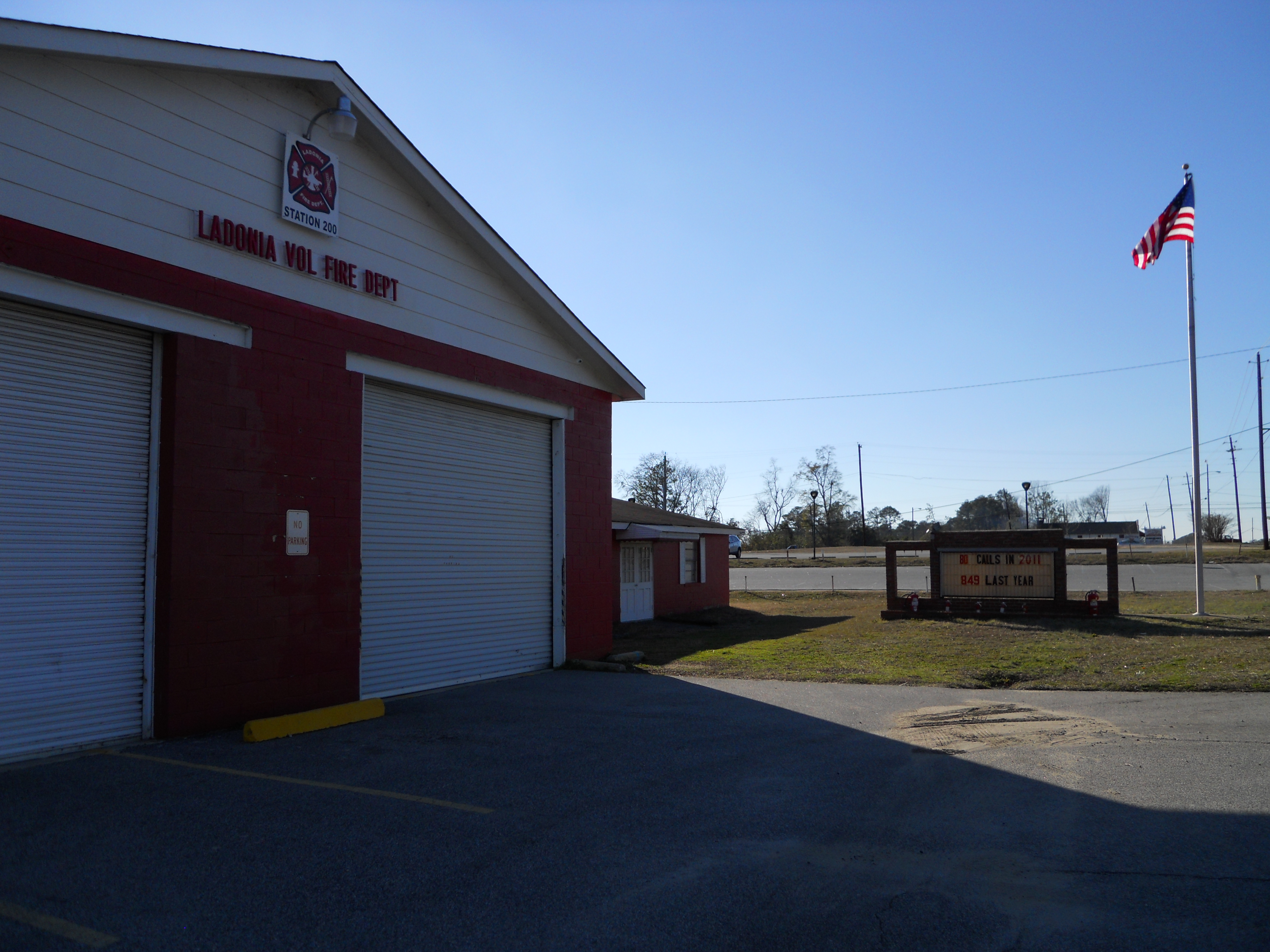
- Ladonia Volunteer Fire Department

- Location in Russell County and the state of Alabama
- Coordinates: 32°27′39″N 85°05′16″W
- Country: United States
- State: Alabama
- County: Russell

Area
  - Total: 3.13 sq mi (8.11 km^{2})
  - Land: 3.13 sq mi (8.10 km^{2})
  - Water: 0.0039 sq mi (0.01 km^{2})
- Elevation: 463 ft (141 m)

Population (2020)
  - Total: 3,074
  - Density: 982.4/sq mi (379.29/km^{2})
- Time zone: UTC-6 (Central (CST))
  - Summer (DST): UTC-5 (CDT)
- FIPS code: 01-40648
- GNIS feature ID: 2403183

Ladonia is an unincorporated community and census-designated place (CDP) in Russell County, Alabama, United States. At the 2020 census, the population was 3,074. It is part of the Columbus, Georgia-Alabama, Metropolitan Statistical Area.

== Geography ==
According to the U.S. Census Bureau, the community has a total area of 3.1 square miles (8.0 km^{2}), all land.

== Demographics ==
Historical population
Census	Pop.	Note	%±
1990	2,905		—
2000	3,229		11.2%
2010	3,142		−2.7%
2020	3,074		−2.2%

=== Racial and ethnic composition ===
Ladonia CDP, Alabama – Racial and ethnic composition Note: the US Census treats Hispanic/Latino as an ethnic category. This table excludes Latinos from the racial categories and assigns them to a separate category. Hispanics/Latinos may be of any race.
Race / Ethnicity (NH = Non-Hispanic)	Pop 2000	Pop 2010	Pop 2020	% 2000	% 2010	% 2020
White alone (NH)	2,937	2,674	2,375	90.96%	85.11%	77.26%
Black or African American alone (NH)	165	305	426	5.11%	9.71%	13.86%
Native American or Alaska Native alone (NH)	21	22	15	0.65%	0.70%	0.49%
Asian alone (NH)	5	9	12	0.15%	0.29%	0.39%
Native Hawaiian or Pacific Islander alone (NH)	0	0	2	0.00%	0.00%	0.07%
Other race alone (NH)	0	2	9	0.00%	0.06%	0.29%
Mixed race or Multiracial (NH)	54	44	150	1.67%	1.40%	4.88%
Hispanic or Latino (any race)	47	86	85	1.46%	2.74%	2.77%
Total	3,229	3,142	3,074	100.00%	100.00%	100.00%

=== 2020 census ===
As of the 2020 census, Ladonia had a population of 3,074. The median age was 40.0 years. 22.4% of residents were under the age of 18 and 17.2% of residents were 65 years of age or older. For every 100 females there were 91.6 males, and for every 100 females age 18 and over there were 89.0 males age 18 and over.

97.9% of residents lived in urban areas, while 2.1% lived in rural areas.

There were 1,247 households in Ladonia, of which 29.1% had children under the age of 18 living in them. Of all households, 41.7% were married-couple households, 22.4% were households with a male householder and no spouse or partner present, and 29.7% were households with a female householder and no spouse or partner present. About 29.4% of all households were made up of individuals and 12.6% had someone living alone who was 65 years of age or older.

There were 1,400 housing units, of which 10.9% were vacant. The homeowner vacancy rate was 0.2% and the rental vacancy rate was 4.8%.

=== 2010 census ===
As of the census of 2010, there were 3,142 people, 1,262 households, and 877 families living in the community. The population density was 1,000 inhabitants per square mile (390/km^{2}). There were 1,392 housing units at an average density of 449.0 per square mile (173.4/km^{2}). The racial makeup of the community was 86.5% White, 9.8% Black or African American, 0.7% Native American, 0.3% Asian, 1.2% from other races, and 1.5% from two or more races. 2.7% of the population were Hispanic or Latino of any race.

There were 1,262 households, out of which 28.3% had children under the age of 18 living with them, 44.3% were married couples living together, 17.9% had a female householder with no husband present, and 30.5% were non-families. 24.7% of all households were made up of individuals, and 8.2% had someone living alone who was 65 years of age or older. The average household size was 2.49 and the average family size was 2.91.

In the community, the population was spread out, with 23.7% under the age of 18, 8.8% from 18 to 24, 24.8% from 25 to 44, 30.1% from 45 to 64, and 12.7% who were 65 years of age or older. The median age was 39.3 years. For every 100 females, there were 99.2 males. For every 100 females age 18 and over, there were 97.8 males.

The median income for a household in the community was $36,333, and the median income for a family was $34,889. Males had a median income of $42,667 versus $27,075 for females. The per capita income for the community was $15,479. About 19.2% of families and 23.5% of the population were below the poverty line, including 19.2% of those under age 18 and 14.6% of those age 65 or over.

=== 2000 census ===
As of the census of 2000, there were 3,229 people, 1,258 households, and 904 families living in the community. The population density was 1,008.6 inhabitants per square mile (389.4/km^{2}). There were 1,407 housing units at an average density of 439.5 per square mile (169.7/km^{2}). The racial makeup of the community was 91.82% White, 5.23% Black or African American, 0.65% Native American, 0.22% Asian, 0.31% from other races, and 1.77% from two or more races. 1.46% of the population were Hispanic or Latino of any race.

There were 1,258 households, out of which 34.2% had children under the age of 18 living with them, 56.4% were married couples living together, 10.2% had a female householder with no husband present, and 28.1% were non-families. 23.0% of all households were made up of individuals, and 7.8% had someone living alone who was 65 years of age or older. The average household size was 2.57 and the average family size was 3.02.

In the community, the population was spread out, with 25.8% under the age of 18, 9.1% from 18 to 24, 31.9% from 25 to 44, 23.0% from 45 to 64, and 10.2% who were 65 years of age or older. The median age was 35 years. For every 100 females, there were 101.2 males. For every 100 females age 18 and over, there were 99.9 males.

The median income for a household in the community was $34,214, and the median income for a family was $37,035. Males had a median income of $30,694 versus $20,227 for females. The per capita income for the community was $16,671. About 15.6% of families and 16.1% of the population were below the poverty line, including 20.2% of those under age 18 and 8.7% of those age 65 or over.
