= Sardis City, Alabama =

- Town
- Location in Etowah and Marshall counties, Alabama
- Coordinates: 34°10′26″N 86°07′12″W
- Country: United States
- State: Alabama
- Counties: Etowah, Marshall

Area
  - Total: 7.88 sq mi (20.41 km^{2})
  - Land: 7.86 sq mi (20.37 km^{2})
  - Water: 0.015 sq mi (0.04 km^{2})
- Elevation: 1,070 ft (330 m)

Population (2020)
  - Total: 1,814
  - Density: 230.7/sq mi (89.06/km^{2})
- Time zone: UTC-6 (Central (CST))
  - Summer (DST): UTC-5 (CDT)
- ZIP code: 35956
- Area code: 256
- FIPS code: 01-68280
- GNIS feature ID: 2407291

Sardis City is a town in Etowah and Marshall counties in the U.S. state of Alabama. It is part of the Gadsden Metropolitan Statistical Area. It originally incorporated in May 1963 under the name of "Sardis". It became Sardis City in the 1980s. At the 2020 census, the population was 1,814.

== Geography ==
Sardis City is located in northern Etowah County. A very small section of the town extends north into Marshall County. The town is bordered to the north by the city of Boaz. U.S. Route 431 passes through the west side of the town, leading northwest through Boaz 8 miles (13 km) to Albertville and southeast 17 miles (27 km) to Gadsden, the Etowah county seat.

According to the U.S. Census Bureau, Sardis City has a total area of 7.9 square miles (20.4 km^{2}), of which 0.015 square miles (0.04 km^{2}), or 0.20%, are water. The town sits at 1,080 feet (330 m) above sea level atop the plateau of Sand Mountain. The town drains east to Short Creek, a north-flowing tributary of the Tennessee River. The Tennessee Valley Divide passes just west of the town limits.

== Demographics ==
Historical population
Census	Pop.	Note	%±
1970	368		—
1980	883		139.9%
1990	1,301		47.3%
2000	1,438		10.5%
2010	1,704		18.5%
2020	1,814		6.5%
U.S. Decennial Census

=== 2020 census ===
As of the 2020 census, there were 1,814 people, 726 households, and 481 families residing in the town.

The median age was 43.5 years. 21.5% of residents were under the age of 18 and 19.8% of residents were 65 years of age or older. For every 100 females there were 93.2 males, and for every 100 females age 18 and over there were 91.1 males age 18 and over.

22.6% of residents lived in urban areas, while 77.4% lived in rural areas.

There were 726 households in Sardis City, of which 33.2% had children under the age of 18 living in them. Of all households, 59.2% were married-couple households, 13.2% were households with a male householder and no spouse or partner present, and 24.4% were households with a female householder and no spouse or partner present. About 24.6% of all households were made up of individuals and 14.2% had someone living alone who was 65 years of age or older.

There were 754 housing units, of which 3.7% were vacant. The homeowner vacancy rate was 0.3% and the rental vacancy rate was 1.9%.

Sardis City racial composition
Race	Num.	Perc.
White (non-Hispanic)	1,666	91.84%
Black or African American (non-Hispanic)	3	0.17%
Native American	1	0.06%
Asian	8	0.44%
Other/Mixed	63	3.47%
Hispanic or Latino	73	4.02%

=== 2010 census ===
At the 2010 census there were 1,704 people, 657 households, and 509 families living in the town. The population density was 220 people per square mile (85 people/km^{2}). There were 703 housing units at an average density of 89.0 units per square mile (34.4 units/km^{2}). The racial makeup of the town was 98.2% White, 0.4% Black or African American, 0.1% Native American, 0.0% Pacific Islander, and 0.6% from two or more races. 0.7% of the population were Hispanic or Latino of any race. Of the 657 households 31.2% had children under the age of 18 living with them, 63.0% were married couples living together, 10.2% had a female householder with no husband present, and 22.5% were non-families. 18.5% of households were one person and 10.5% were one person aged 65 or older. The average household size was 2.59 and the average family size was 2.97.

The age distribution was 24.4% under the age of 18, 6.8% from 18 to 24, 24.6% from 25 to 44, 28.1% from 45 to 64, and 16.1% 65 or older. The median age was 40.9 years. For every 100 females, there were 92.5 males. For every 100 females age 18 and over, there were 93.3 males.

The median household income was $45,714 and the median family income was $59,352. Males had a median income of $44,091 versus $28,333 for females. The per capita income for the town was $22,767. About 6.2% of families and 11.4% of the population were below the poverty line, including 8.9% of those under age 18 and 33.5% of those age 65 or over.

=== 2000 census ===
At the 2000 census there were 1,438 people, 572 households, and 458 families living in the town. The population density was 195.1 inhabitants per square mile (75.3/km^{2}). There were 597 housing units at an average density of 81.0 units per square mile (31.3 units/km^{2}). The racial makeup of the town was 99.10% White, 0.14% Black or African American, 0.07% Native American, 0.14% Pacific Islander, and 0.56% from two or more races. 0.63% of the population were Hispanic or Latino of any race. Of the 572 households 32.2% had children under the age of 18 living with them, 68.7% were married couples living together, 8.4% had a female householder with no husband present, and 19.9% were non-families. 18.5% of households were one person and 9.6% were one person aged 65 or older. The average household size was 2.51 and the average family size was 2.82.

The age distribution was 22.2% under the age of 18, 9.3% from 18 to 24, 28.4% from 25 to 44, 26.1% from 45 to 64, and 14.0% 65 or older. The median age was 38 years. For every 100 females, there were 100.0 males. For every 100 females age 18 and over, there were 94.6 males.

The median household income was $36,000 and the median family income was $44,063. Males had a median income of $31,875 versus $21,711 for females. The per capita income for the town was $18,411. About 7.4% of families and 10.0% of the population were below the poverty line, including 11.9% of those under age 18 and 10.7% of those age 65 or over.
