= Lake Guntersville State Park =

State park in Marshall County, Alabama, United States

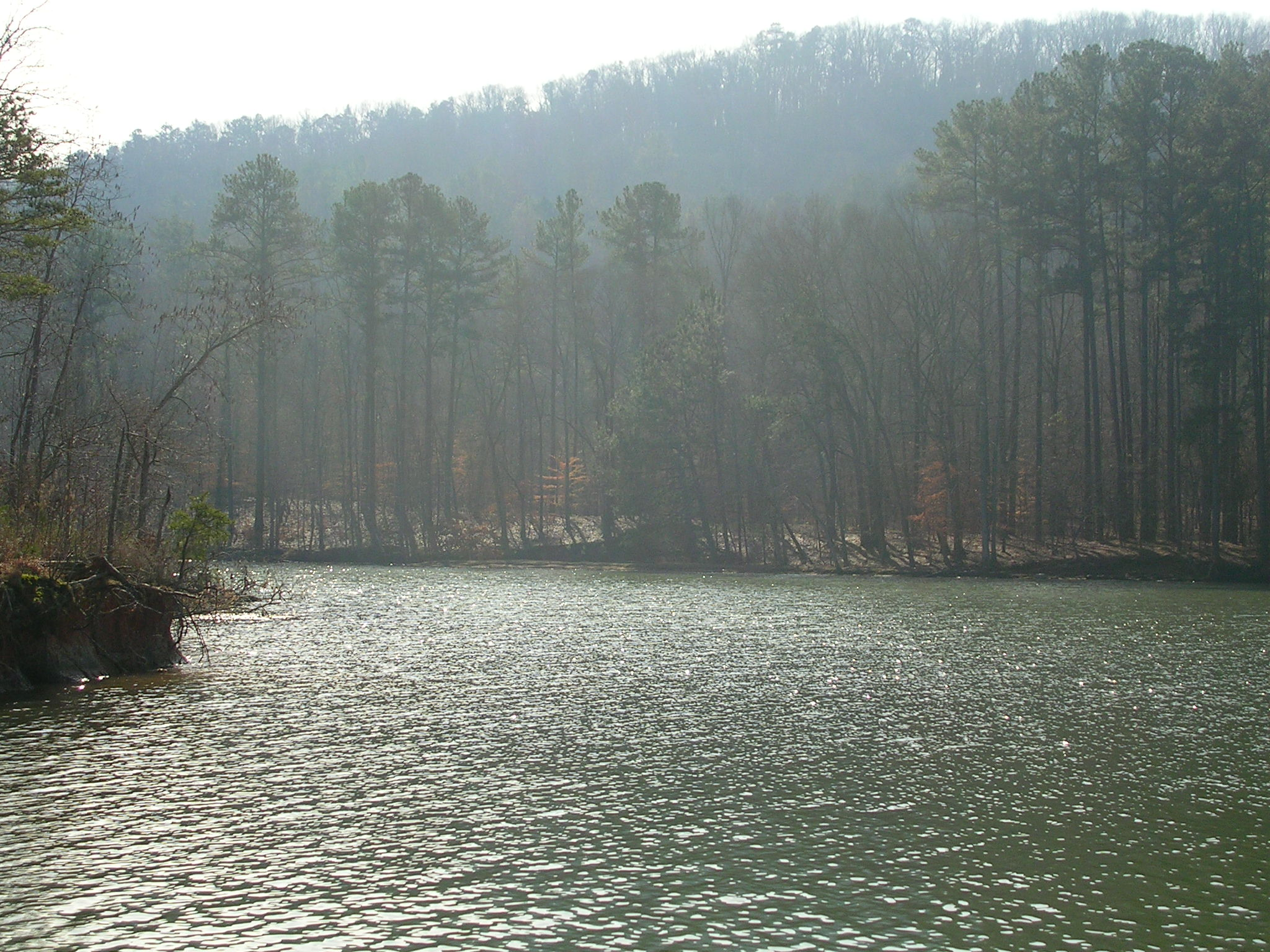

- Location within Alabama
- Location: Guntersville, Alabama, United States
- Coordinates: 34°22′52″N 86°12′13″W
- Area: 5,909 acres (2,391 ha)
- Elevation: 984 ft (300 m)
- Established: 1947; opened 1974
- Administrator: Alabama Department of Conservation and Natural Resources
- Website: Official website

Lake Guntersville State Park is a public recreation area located on the far north side of the city of Guntersville in Marshall County, Alabama. The state park occupies 5,909 acres (2,391 ha) on the eastern shore of Guntersville Lake, a 69,000-acre (28,000 ha) impoundment of the Tennessee River. The park features resort facilities and is managed by the Alabama Department of Conservation and Natural Resources.

== History ==
The state park had its beginnings in 1947, when the Tennessee Valley Authority transferred 4,000 acres (1,600 ha) on Guntersville Reservoir to the state to create what was first known as Little Mountain State Park. The park opened in 1974.

In 2011, the park suffered severe damage when it was struck twice during the tornado outbreak of April 27. Hundreds of trees in the northern half of the park were destroyed by an EF2 tornado that struck in the early morning. The campgrounds also saw damage done to RV campers and the camp lodge. A second tornado, rated EF1, followed shortly after the first, damaging the park entrance and golf course. Two years later, the campground officially reopened, following a rebuilding and upgrading of facilities and the planting of more than 400 new trees.

== Awards ==
In September 2020, Lake Guntersville State Park was one of eleven Alabama state parks awarded Tripadvisor’s Traveler’s Choice Award, which recognizes businesses and attractions that earn consistently high user reviews.

== Activities and amenities ==
The park features a resort inn, restaurant and convention complex on Taylor Mountain, 18-hole golf course, fishing center, beach complex, lakeview cottages, lakeside campground, and 36 miles (58 km) of National Recreation Trail-designated trails for hiking, mountain biking and horseback riding. The park opened a zip lining course in 2016, later adding a Level 2 course in 2017.

The park is also known for its bald eagle population and hosts an annual Eagle Awareness Weekend each January, a wildlife education event that marked its 40th year in 2026.
