= Douglas, Alabama =

- Town
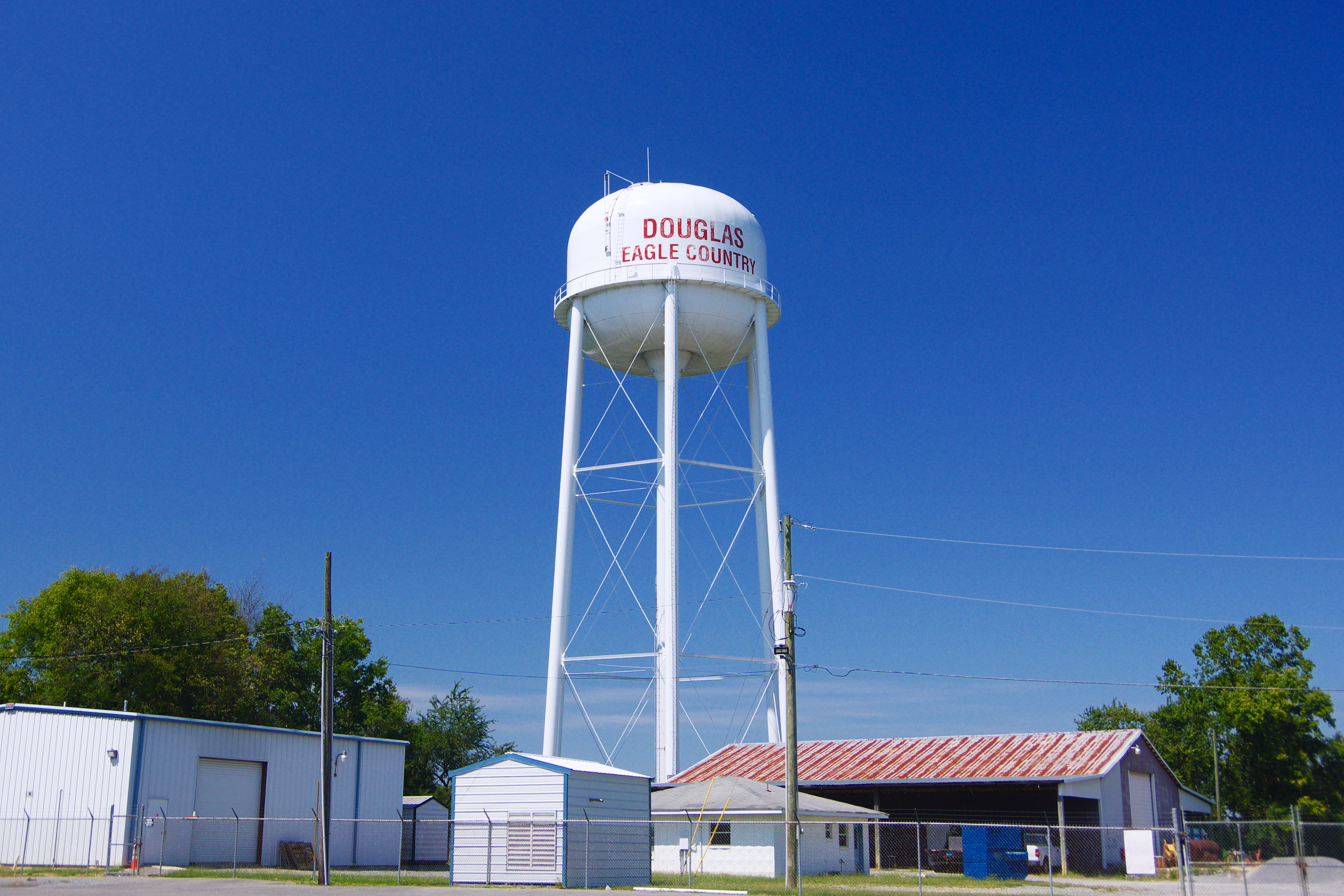
- "Eagle Country" water tower in Douglas

- Flag Seal

- Location in Marshall County, Alabama
- Coordinates: 34°10′14″N 86°19′21″W
- Country: United States
- State: Alabama
- County: Marshall

Area
  - Total: 3.41 sq mi (8.84 km^{2})
  - Land: 3.41 sq mi (8.82 km^{2})
  - Water: 0.0077 sq mi (0.02 km^{2})
- Elevation: 945 ft (288 m)

Population (2020)
  - Total: 761
  - Density: 224/sq mi (86.3/km^{2})
- Time zone: UTC-6 (Central (CST))
  - Summer (DST): UTC-5 (CDT)
- ZIP code: 35964
- Area code: 256
- FIPS code: 01-21328
- GNIS feature ID: 2406390
- Website: www.douglasal.com

Douglas is a town in Marshall County, Alabama, United States. Douglas, a part of the Huntsville–Decatur Combined Statistical Area, had a population of 761 as of the 2020 census. The town incorporated in 1978.

== History ==
Douglas was first settled in the mid-19th century. Its first school was built in 1898, followed by Douglas Academy in 1909.

== Geography ==
Douglas is located in southern Marshall County. The town is concentrated around the intersection of State Route 75 and State Route 168, 9 miles (14 km) southwest of Albertville, 11 miles (18 km) west of Boaz, and 6 miles (10 km) northeast of Snead. Guntersville Lake lies 15 miles (24 km) to the north.

According to the U.S. Census Bureau, the town of Douglas has a total area of 3.4 square miles (8.8 km^{2}), of which 0.01 square miles (0.02 km^{2}), or 0.24%, are water. Douglas sits at 940 feet (290 m) above sea level atop the southwest end of Sand Mountain, within the watershed of the Locust Fork of the Black Warrior River, which passes 5 miles (8 km) to the southwest of the town.

== Demographics ==
Historical population
Census	Pop.	Note	%±
1970	201		—
1980	199		−1.0%
1990	474		138.2%
2000	530		11.8%
2010	744		40.4%
2020	761		2.3%
U.S. Decennial Census; 2013 Estimate

At the 2000 census, there were 530 people, 213 households and 158 families residing in the town. The population density was 171.0 inhabitants per square mile (66.0/km^{2}). There were 231 housing units at an average density of 74.5 per square mile (28.8/km^{2}). The racial makeup of the town was 96.79% White, 0.57% Native American, 0.19% Asian, 2.08% from other races, and 0.38% from two or more races. 2.64% of the population were Hispanic or Latino of any race.

There were 213 households, of which 35.7% had children under the age of 18 living with them, 57.7% were married couples living together, 13.6% had a female householder with no husband present, and 25.8% were non-families. 24.9% of all households were made up of individuals, and 12.2% had someone living alone who was 65 years of age or older. The average household size was 2.49 and the average family size was 2.95.

Age distribution was 27.4% under the age of 18, 10.2% from 18 to 24, 29.1% from 25 to 44, 23.6% from 45 to 64, and 9.8% who were 65 years of age or older. The median age was 32 years. For every 100 females, there were 99.2 males. For every 100 females age 18 and over, there were 92.5 males.

The median household income was $33,594, and the median family income was $36,000. Males had a median income of $32,143 versus $19,375 for females. The per capita income for the town was $22,410. About 8.8% of families and 9.8% of the population were below the poverty line, including 15.9% of those under age 18 and 9.8% of those age 65 or over.
