= Boaz, Alabama =

City in Alabama, United States

- City
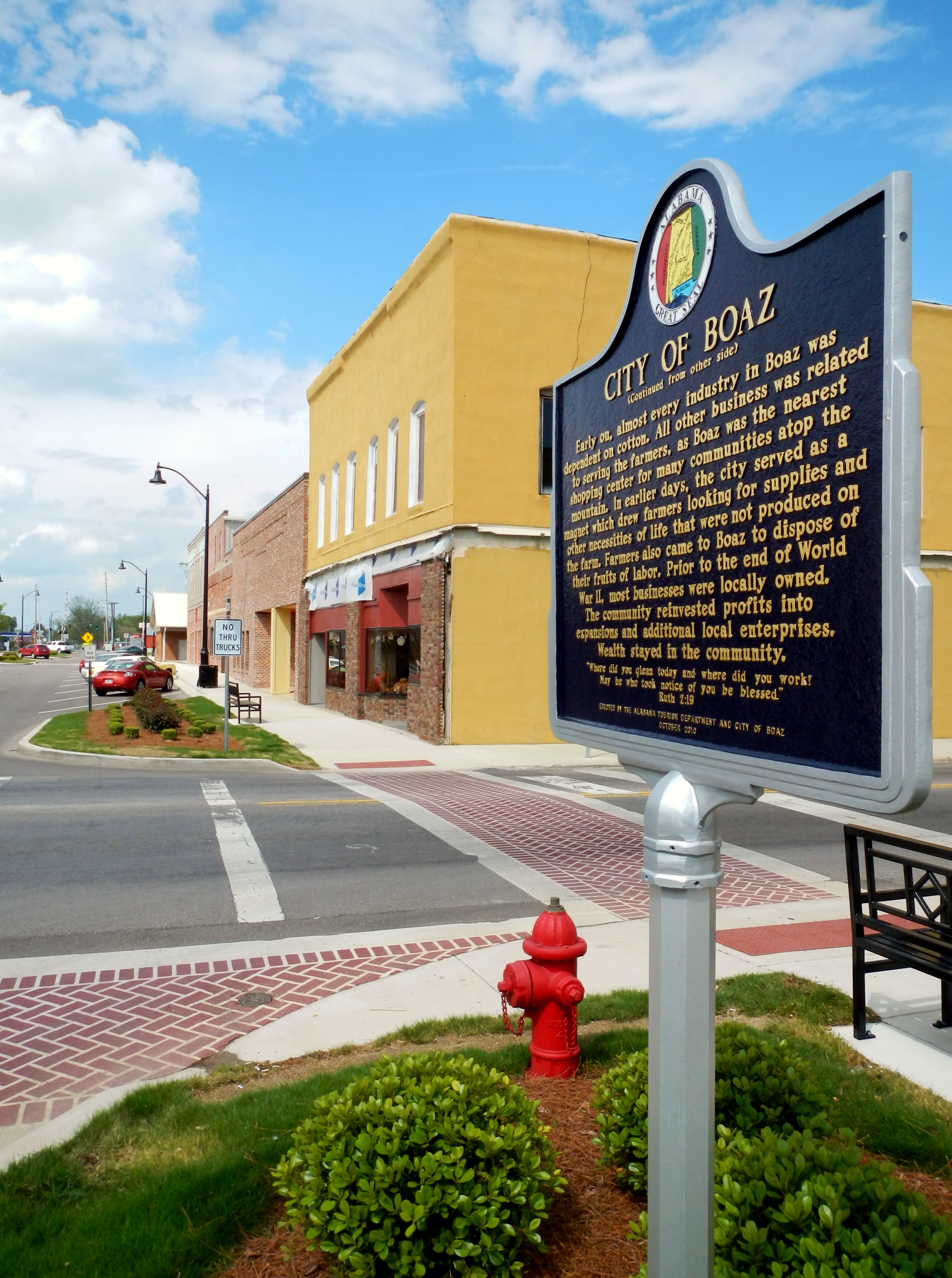
- Boaz in 2012

- Flag Seal
- Nickname: City of Possibilities
- Location in Etowah and Marshall counties, Alabama
- Coordinates: 34°11′58″N 86°08′05″W
- Country: United States
- State: Alabama
- Counties: Marshall, Etowah
- Established: 1897

Government
  - Type: Mayor and Council

Area
  - Total: 14.61 sq mi (37.85 km^{2})
  - Land: 14.55 sq mi (37.68 km^{2})
  - Water: 0.062 sq mi (0.16 km^{2})
- Elevation: 1,073 ft (327 m)

Population (2020)
  - Total: 10,107
  - Density: 695/sq mi (268.2/km^{2})
- Time zone: UTC-6 (Central (CST))
  - Summer (DST): UTC-5 (CDT)
- ZIP codes: 35957, 35956
- Area code: 256
- FIPS code: 2403886
- GNIS feature ID: 01-07912
- Website: cityofboaz.org

Boaz is a city in Marshall and Etowah counties in the U.S. state of Alabama. The Marshall County portion of the city is part of the Albertville Micropolitan Statistical Area. As of the 2020 census, the city's population was 10,107. Boaz was known for its outlet shops.

== History ==
First settled in the 1850s, the town of Boaz was officially founded November 11, 1878, by the Sparks family of Georgia. A post office has been in operation since 1887. The city was named after Boaz, from the Bible. It was incorporated in 1897.

Prior to World War II, Boaz hosted a primarily cotton-based economy, only diversifying to livestock and poultry with the pressures of boll weevil infestations and the Great Depression. After the war, Boaz developed a thriving automotive sales industry, which in many instances survives to this day.

In the early 1980s, the VF Corporation opened an outlet store in an abandoned factory, whose success prompted other retailers to open stores. In the late 1980s, Boaz was a tourist attraction with 130 outlet stores, attracting five million people per year. Retailers moved away from Boaz due to a dwindling customer base, dropping to 80 stores in the early 1990s, with the Great Recession of the 2000s driving away even more. In 2016, three buildings of the outlet center were demolished.

The Julia Street Memorial United Methodist Church, Snead Junior College Historic District, the Thomas A. Snellgrove Homestead and the Edward Fenns Whitman House are listed on the National Register of Historic Places. The Alabama Register of Landmarks and Heritage lists the Boaz Elementary School, the First Baptist Church and Cemetery, and the Methodist Episcopal Church, South.

== Geography ==
Boaz is located in southeastern Marshall County and extends south into Etowah County. The city sits atop Sand Mountain (a plateau) at 1,080 feet (330 m) above sea level. It is bordered to the north by Albertville and to the southeast by Sardis City. U.S. Route 431 passes through the east side of the city, leading north 16 miles (26 km) to Guntersville and south 20 miles (32 km) to Gadsden.

According to the U.S. Census Bureau, the city of Boaz has a total area of 14.6 square miles (38 km^{2}), of which 0.06 square miles (0.16 km^{2}), or 0.43%, are water. Most of the city drains west to either Slab Creek or Clear Creek, tributaries of the Locust Fork of the Black Warrior River. The Tennessee Valley Divide crosses the east side of the city, with the eastern portions of the city draining to Short Creek, a north-flowing tributary of the Tennessee River.

== Demographics ==
Historical population
| Census | Pop. | Note | %± |
|---|---|---|---|
| 1900 | 253 | | — |
| 1910 | 1,010 | | 299.2% |
| 1920 | 1,369 | | 35.5% |
| 1930 | 1,691 | | 23.5% |
| 1940 | 1,927 | | 14.0% |
| 1950 | 3,078 | | 59.7% |
| 1960 | 4,654 | | 51.2% |
| 1970 | 5,635 | | 21.1% |
| 1980 | 7,149 | | 26.9% |
| 1990 | 6,928 | | −3.1% |
| 2000 | 7,411 | | 7.0% |
| 2010 | 9,551 | | 28.9% |
| 2020 | 10,107 | | 5.8% |
U.S. Decennial Census

=== Racial and ethnic composition ===
Boaz city, Alabama – Racial and ethnic composition Note: the US Census treats Hispanic/Latino as an ethnic category. This table excludes Latinos from the racial categories and assigns them to a separate category. Hispanics/Latinos may be of any race.
| Race / Ethnicity (NH = Non-Hispanic) | Pop 1980 | Pop 1990 | Pop 2000 | Pop 2010 | Pop 2020 | % 1980 | % 1990 | % 2000 | % 2010 | % 2020 |
|---|---|---|---|---|---|---|---|---|---|---|
| White alone (NH) | 7,071 | 6,800 | 6,818 | 7,813 | 7,264 | 98.91% | 98.15% | 92.00% | 81.80% | 71.87% |
| Black or African American alone (NH) | 11 | 55 | 96 | 152 | 189 | 0.15% | 0.79% | 1.30% | 1.59% | 1.87% |
| Native American or Alaska Native alone (NH) | 7 | 30 | 29 | 21 | 43 | 0.10% | 0.43% | 0.39% | 0.22% | 0.43% |
| Asian alone (NH) | 3 | 16 | 33 | 68 | 57 | 0.04% | 0.23% | 0.45% | 0.71% | 0.56% |
| Native Hawaiian or Pacific Islander alone (NH) | x | x | 1 | 30 | 98 | x | x | 0.01% | 0.31% | 0.97% |
| Other race alone (NH) | 0 | 2 | 0 | 3 | 35 | 0.00% | 0.03% | 0.00% | 0.03% | 0.35% |
| Mixed race or Multiracial (NH) | x | x | 65 | 108 | 372 | x | x | 0.88% | 1.13% | 3.68% |
| Hispanic or Latino (any race) | 54 | 25 | 369 | 1,356 | 2,049 | 0.76% | 0.36% | 4.98% | 14.20% | 20.27% |
| Total | 7,149 | 6,928 | 7,411 | 9,551 | 10,107 | 100.00% | 100.00% | 100.00% | 100.00% | 100.00% |

=== 2020 census ===
As of the 2020 census, Boaz had a population of 10,107 and 3,888 households; 2,197 were families. The median age was 36.6 years. 26.0% of residents were under the age of 18 and 17.9% were 65 years of age or older. For every 100 females there were 91.0 males, and for every 100 females age 18 and over there were 86.1 males age 18 and over.

83.5% of residents lived in urban areas, while 16.5% lived in rural areas.

Of the 3,888 households, 33.7% had children under the age of 18 living in them. Of all households, 43.3% were married-couple households, 17.1% were households with a male householder and no spouse or partner present, and 33.1% were households with a female householder and no spouse or partner present. About 30.7% of all households were made up of individuals and 16.0% had someone living alone who was 65 years of age or older.

There were 4,192 housing units, of which 7.3% were vacant. The homeowner vacancy rate was 1.8% and the rental vacancy rate was 7.3%.

=== 2010 census ===
At the 2010 census, there were 9,551 people, 3,712 households, and 2,479 families living in the city. The population density was 782.9 inhabitants per square mile (302.3/km^{2}). There were 4,036 housing units at an average density of 330.8 per square mile (127.7/km^{2}). The racial makeup of the city was 87.3% White, 1.8% Black or African American, 0.4% Native American, 0.7% Asian, 0.3% Pacific Islander, 7.9% from other races, and 1.6% from two or more races. 14.2% of the population were Hispanic or Latino of any race.

Of the 3,712 households 30.7% had children under the age of 18 living with them, 46.7% were married couples living together, 14.3% had a female householder with no husband present, and 33.2% were non-families. 29.6% of households were one person and 14.7% were one person aged 65 or older. The average household size was 2.52 and the average family size was 3.11.

The age distribution was 25.9% under the age of 18, 9.5% from 18 to 24, 26.0% from 25 to 44, 22.2% from 45 to 64, and 16.4% 65 or older. The median age was 36 years. For every 100 females, there were 90.0 males. For every 100 females age 18 and over, there were 95.4 males.

The median household income was $31,172 and the median family income was $42,973. Males had a median income of $32,446 versus $27,924 for females. The per capita income for the city was $17,697. About 11.7% of families and 16.0 of the population were below the poverty line, including 24.1% of those under age 18 and 17.1% of those age 65 or over.

=== 2000 census ===
At the 2000 census, there were 7,411 people, 3,155 households, and 2,085 families living in the city. The population density was 607.7 inhabitants per square mile (234.6/km^{2}). There were 3,468 housing units at an average density of 284.4 per square mile (109.8/km^{2}). The racial makeup of the city was 93.50% White, 1.31% Black or African American, 0.47% Native American, 0.45% Asian, 0.04% Pacific Islander, 3.01% from other races, and 1.23% from two or more races. 4.98% of the population were Hispanic or Latino of any race.

Of the 3,155 households 28.7% had children under the age of 18 living with them, 50.8% were married couples living together, 12.6% had a female householder with no husband present, and 33.9% were non-families. 30.7% of households were one person and 16.3% were one person aged 65 or older. The average household size was 2.30 and the average family size was 2.86.

The age distribution was 23.0% under the age of 18, 8.3% from 18 to 24, 26.2% from 25 to 44, 23.3% from 45 to 64, and 19.2% 65 or older. The median age was 39 years. For every 100 females, there were 83.8 males. For every 100 females age 18 and over, there were 78.5 males.

The median household income was $25,699 and the median family income was $34,018. Males had a median income of $29,504 versus $21,750 for females. The per capita income for the city was $15,664. About 13.9% of families and 18.7% of the population were below the poverty line, including 20.7% of those under age 18 and 25.4% of those age 65 or over.

== Education ==
In May 2004, five schools broke away from the Marshall County Schools and formed the Boaz City School District.

Boaz is the site of Snead State Community College.

== Climate ==
Climate is characterized by relatively high temperatures and evenly distributed precipitation throughout the year. The Köppen Climate Classification subtype for this climate is "Cfa" (Humid Subtropical Climate).

== Notable people ==
- James Fischer, engineer who developed high-purity silicon technology for Texas Instruments
- Tim Hodge, voice actor and director for Big Idea Entertainment
- Jody Hunt, United States Assistant Attorney General (2018–2020)
- Rose Maddox, country music singer-songwriter and fiddle player
- Wayne Peterson, racing driver
- Eddie Priest, former Major League Baseball pitcher
- John Roberts, Navy Cross recipient
