= Alabama State Route 117 =

State highway in Alabama, United States

State Route 117

Route information
- Maintained by ALDOT
- Length: 50 mi (80 km)

Major junctions
- South end: SR 48 at the Georgia state line southeast of Mentone
- US 11 in Hammondville; I-59 in Hammondville; SR 75 in Ider; SR 71 in Flat Rock; US 72 in Stevenson
- North end: SR 56 at the Tennessee state line north of Bass

Location
- Country: United States
- State: Alabama
- Counties: DeKalb, Jackson

Highway system
- Alabama State Highway System; Interstate; US; State
← SR 116	→ SR 118

State Route 117 (SR 117) is a 50-mile-long (80 km) state highway in the U.S. state of Alabama. It travels northwest from the Georgia state line eight miles (13 km) southeast of Mentone to the Tennessee state line four miles (6.4 km) north of Bass.

== Route description ==
SR 117 begins at the Georgia line near the town of Mentone. It winds through slightly mountainous terrain before entering the town of Mentone. This town is among the highest points in the state, at a maximum height of 1,800 feet (550 m). It descends down Lookout Mountain and enters Valley Head, which is at about 1,000-foot (300 m) elevation. The route turns northwest and enters Hammondville, where it junctions with, and maintains a short concurrency with. U.S. Route 11 (US 11). It turns off of the route and junctions with Interstate 59 (I-59).

It junctions with SR 40 west. It continues northwest and enters Ider. It junctions with SR 75. It continues over the Jackson County line.

It enters Flat Rock and junctions with SR 71. The route descends down Sand Mountain and enters Stevenson. It junctions with US 72 at a diamond interchange. It continues into downtown and turns off of its right-of-way, entering the plains of northern Jackson County. It passes through a few ridges and some unincorporated communities before turning off of its right-of-way again. It continues east for about two miles before turning north again. It crosses the Tennessee state line in the unincorporated community of Sherwood, where it immediately turns off of its right-of-way again as SR 56 and crosses a railroad track directly beside a Lhoist North America industrial plant.

This route is an important corridor, connecting one of the lowest parts of North Alabama with one of the highest parts of North Alabama.

== Major intersections ==
County	Location	mi	km	Destinations	Notes
DeKalb		0.0	0.0	SR 48 east – Menlo, Summerville	Continuation beyond Georgia state line
DeKalb	Hammondville	10.4	16.7	US 11 south (SR 7) – Fort Payne	Southern end of US 11/SR 7 concurrency
DeKalb	Hammondville	10.5	16.9	US 11 north (SR 7) / SR 40 begins – Trenton, GA	Northern end of US 11/SR 7 concurrency; eastern terminus of SR 40; southern end of SR 40 concurrency
DeKalb		11.7	18.8	I-59 – Chattanooga, Gadsden	I-59 exit 231
DeKalb		13.2	21.2	SR 40 west – Henagar	Northern end of SR 40 concurrency
DeKalb	Beaty Crossroads	19.7	31.7	SR 75 – Henagar, Trenton, GA	
Jackson	Flat Rock	25.2	40.6	SR 71 – Higdon, Pisgah	
Jackson	Stevenson	37.0	59.5	US 72 (John T. Reid Parkway/SR 2) – Bridgeport, Scottsboro	Interchange
Jackson		50.2	80.8	SR 56 north (Sherwood Road) – Sherwood, Sewanee	Continuation beyond Tennessee state line
1.000 mi = 1.609 km; 1.000 km = 0.621 mi: Concurrency terminus
