= 2011 Flat Rock–Trenton tornado =

2011 EF4 tornado in Alabama, U.S.

- The tornado at EF4 intensity north of Pisgah, Alabama, seen from Mentone, Alabama

Meteorological history
- Formed: April 27, 2011, 4:01 p.m. CDT (UTC−05:00)
- Dissipated: April 27, 2011, 5:57 p.m. EDT (UTC−04:00)
- Duration: 56 minutes

EF4 tornado
- on the Enhanced Fujita scale
- Max width: 1,260 yards (0.72 mi; 1.15 km)
- Path length: 47 miles (76 km)
- Highest winds: 190 mph (310 km/h)

Overall effects
- Fatalities: 15 (+2 indirect)
- Injuries: 50
- Areas affected: Jackson County, Alabama, DeKalb County, Alabama, Dade County, Georgia, Walker County, Georgia
- Part of the 2011 Super Outbreak and Tornadoes of 2011

On the afternoon of April 27, 2011, a large, long-tracked, and destructive EF4 tornado, known informally as the Section–Flat Rock EF4 by the National Weather Service, moved across portions of North Alabama and North Georgia, tracking near the towns of Section, Pisgah, Flat Rock, Higdon and Rosalie in Alabama and Trenton in Georgia along its 47-mile-long (76 km) track. The tornado directly killed 15 people, injured at least 50 more, and impacted hundreds of structures. It occurred as part of the largest tornado outbreak in modern history, and was one of multiple EF4-rated tornadoes to be confirmed that day.

The tornado first touched down near Section, initially producing EF0 and EF1-rated damage to trees and homes before becoming violent north of Pisgah. Several homes were heavily damaged in the area and trees were blown down; the tornado killed 13 people in Jackson County alone. The tornado maintained its intensity as it moved through Dekalb County before crossing into Dade County, Georgia at EF4 intensity, where two people would be killed and heavy damage was inflicted to the community of Trenton. The tornado lifted after 56 minutes on the ground. Damage from the tornado was rated EF4 on the Enhanced Fujita scale, and damage surveyors estimated that the tornado had maximum estimated wind speeds of approximately 190 miles per hour (310 km/h). WDEF-TV described the tornado as the "longest-running in our area".

== Meteorological synopsis ==
=== Setup ===
The environmental conditions leading up to the 2011 Super Outbreak were among the "most conducive to violent tornadoes ever documented". On April 25, a vigorous upper-level shortwave trough moved into the Southern Plains states. Ample instability, low-level moisture, and wind shear all fueled a significant tornado outbreak from Texas to Tennessee; at least 64 tornadoes touched down on this day. An area of low pressure consolidated over Texas on April 26 and traveled east while the aforementioned shortwave trough traversed the Mississippi and Ohio River valleys. Another 50 tornadoes touched down on this day. The multi-day outbreak culminated on April 27 with the most violent day of tornadic activity since the 1974 Super Outbreak. Multiple episodes of tornadic activity ensued with two waves of mesoscale convective systems in the morning hours followed by a widespread outbreak of supercells from Mississippi to North Carolina during the afternoon into the evening.

Tornadic activity on April 27 was precipitated by a 995 mbar (hPa; 29.39 inHg) surface low situated over Kentucky and a deep, negatively tilted (aligned northwest to southeast) trough over Arkansas and Louisiana. A strong southwesterly surface jet intersected these systems at a 60° angle, an ageostrophic flow that led to storm-relative helicity values in excess of 500 m^{2}s^{−2}—indicative of extreme wind shear and a very high potential for rotating updrafts within supercells. Ample moisture from the Gulf of Mexico was brought north across the Deep South, leading to daytime high temperatures of 77 to 81 °F (25 to 27 °C) and dewpoints of 66 to 72 °F (19 to 22 °C). Furthermore, convective available potential energy (CAPE) values reached 2,500–3,000 J/kg^{−1}.

=== Forecast ===
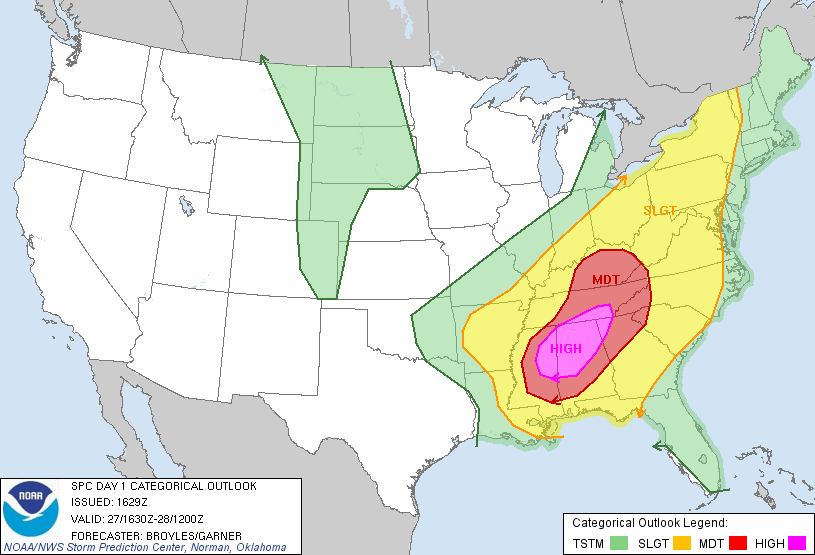
The National Weather Service Storm Prediction Center's Day 1 Convective Outlook for April 27, showing the Categorical Graphic

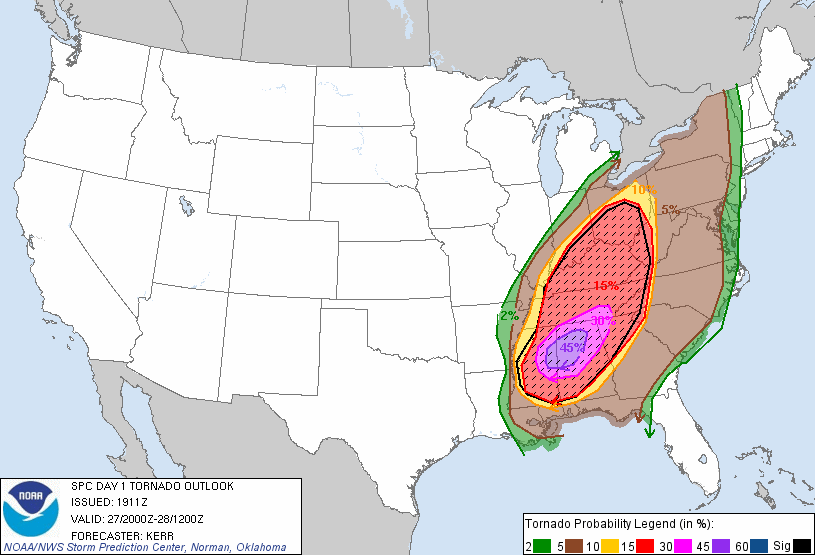
The probability of a tornado within 25 miles of a point (cross-hatched area: 10% or greater probability of EF2+ tornadoes)

On the morning of April 27, a strong cold front with several areas of embedded low pressure extended from the Texas Hill Country northeastward towards the Arklatex and the Ozarks, and later into the lower Ohio Valley. Warm moist air was in place due to strong southerly flow ahead of the front over Mississippi, Alabama, and Tennessee. An upper level disturbance sparked a broad area of showers and thunderstorms as it moved across the frontal boundary on the previous evening. The eastern edge of the line of showers and storms continued to move eastward, in concert with the upper disturbance, reaching the northwest Alabama border around 2:00 a.m. CDT.

This produced the last and most violent round of severe weather, which began around 2:30 p.m. CDT for northern Alabama as supercells began to line up to the southwest of the area. During the early afternoon hours, the potential for destructive tornadoes was highlighted by the Storm Prediction Center's upgrade to a high risk for severe weather around 1:00 p.m. CDT. This prompted a particularly dangerous situation (PDS) tornado watch, which was issued for northern Alabama and portions of southern Tennessee at 1:45 p.m. CDT. The bulletin that accompanied the watch read:

THE NWS STORM PREDICTION CENTER HAS ISSUED A TORNADO WATCH FOR PORTIONS OF: MUCH OF ALABAMA, NORTHWEST GEORGIA, SOUTHEAST MISSISSIPPI, SOUTHERN MIDDLE TENNESSEE, EFFECTIVE THIS WEDNESDAY AFTERNOON AND EVENING FROM 145 PM UNTIL 1000 PM CDT.

...THIS IS A PARTICULARLY DANGEROUS SITUATION...

DESTRUCTIVE TORNADOES...LARGE HAIL TO 4 INCHES IN DIAMETER. THUNDERSTORM WIND GUSTS TO 80 MPH...AND DANGEROUS LIGHTNING ARE POSSIBLE IN THESE AREAS.

The potential for tornadoes ramped up from noon through 9:00 p.m. CDT. During this period, much of Alabama experienced numerous supercell thunderstorms that produced numerous tornadoes, including the Trenton tornado.

=== Morning EF1 tornado in Trenton and New England, Georgia ===
On the morning of April 27, an EF1 tornado touched down a short distance to the north of where the EF4 tornado would later impact. The tornado touched down at around 8:40 a.m. CDT on top of an interchange in the western portions, moving to the northeast. West of Wolverine Drive the tornado reached EF1 intensity, impacting the Dade Elementary before crossing 1st Street and John Street. It weakened to EF0 strength shortly before passing over Wren Avenue. The tornado moved through a neighborhood between North Main Street and Interstate 59 before moving directly parallel to Highway 11. It reached EF1 intensity for a second time as it impacted the northwest portions of New England, before weakening again as it crossed Squirrel Town Creek. The tornado continued northeast through unpopulated areas in Dade County to the west of Morganville. It remained relatively thin as it moved over the Slygo Ridge, part of the Slygo Valley region. Several roads were hit at EF0 intensity as the tornado continued, eventually crossing Interstate 24 and lifting a short distance to the west of Hooker. The tornado caused no fatalities or injuries.

== Tornado summary ==
- Damage survey track of this tornado (centermost red line), as well as the tracks of other EF3+ tornadoes that occurred during 2011 Super Outbreak. (Interactive map, click or tap to view in detail); View mapdata Key EF0 65–85 mph (105–137 km/h); EF1 86–110 mph (138–177 km/h); EF2 111–135 mph (179–217 km/h); EF3 136–165 mph (219–266 km/h); EF4 166–200 mph (267–322 km/h); EF5 ≥201 mph (323 km/h)

This multiple-vortex EF4 tornado that originated from the Cullman supercell, with maximum sustained winds of up to 190 mph (310 km/h), devastated portions of Jackson and DeKalb counties in Alabama, as well as Dade and Walker counties in Georgia along a 47-mile-long (76 km) path at times up to 1,260 yards (1,150 m) wide, killing 14 people and injuring at least 50 others.

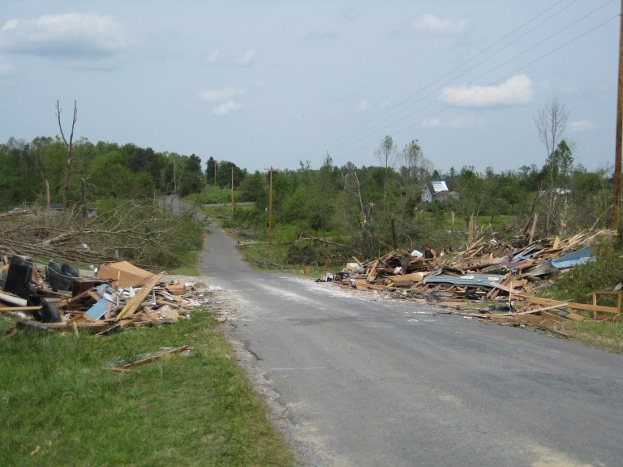
Damage to homes in Jackson County

The tornado first touched down on Alabama State Highway 35, moving to the northeast. It moved parallel to County Road 390, before crossing over Alabama State Highway 40. Trees were blown down north of County Road 224, before the tornado briefly moved over an offshoot of the Tennessee River. It continued moving northeast through hilly areas of Marshall County, continuing to produce tree damage and damaging several homes near County Road 88. Off Alabama State Highway 88, several homes sustained damage and trees were blown down on the properties. The tornado then crossed County Road 432 and County Road 57, impacting the Dogwood Branch of the Tennessee River directly north of Pisgah. On County Roads 369, several homes were heavily damaged.

To their north the tornado tossed debris into a grove of trees and scattered debris from a property across a field. The tornado then passed over County Road 58 and County Road 357, where more damage was done to trees and homes. A home was destroyed as the tornado passed over County Road 58 before the tornado crossed over the Rocky Branch of the Tennessee River. It then impacted County Road 426 and County Road 126 north of the communities of Glenzaida and Rosalie. The tornado continued moving through areas a short distance south of the Coon Gulf and northwest to north of County Road 78. The tornado rapidly intensified to low-end EF4 strength in this area as it destroyed numerous mobile homes and brick-foundation homes, scattering debris hundreds of yards and killing three people.

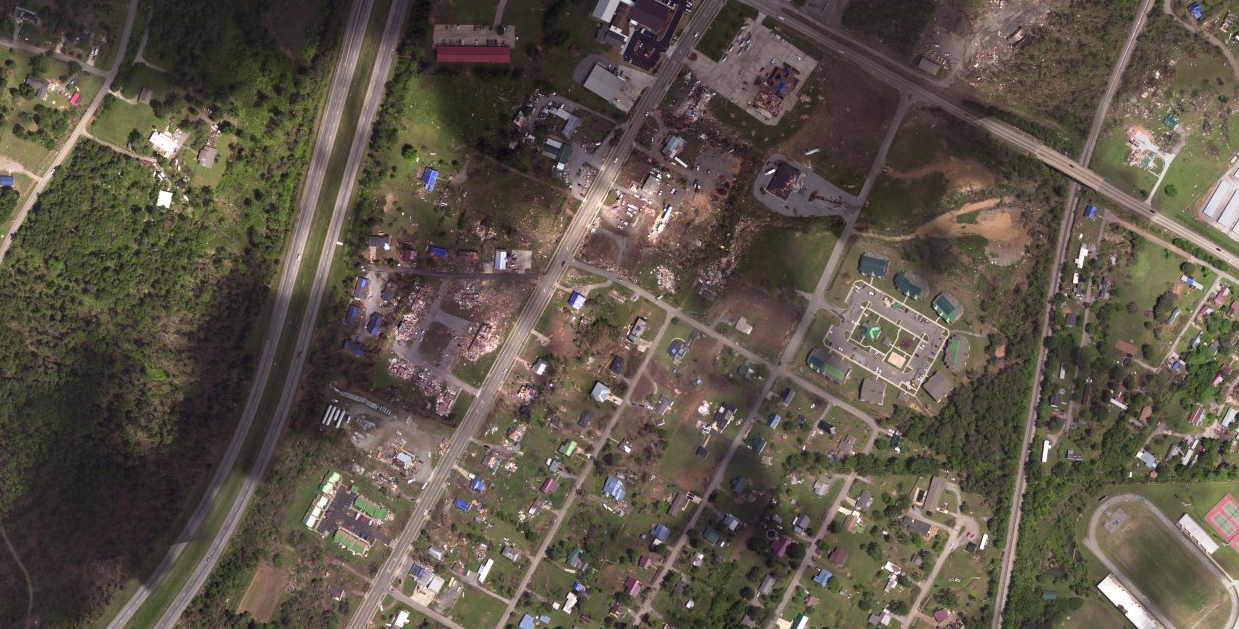
Aerial photograph of Trenton, Georgia on May 4, showing damaged homes

Thousands of trees were snapped and debarked, vehicles were thrown up to 50 yards (46 m) in different directions, and barns and chicken houses were heavily damaged, along with the roof of a church. As it passed near Flat Rock and Higdon, the tornado reached high-end EF4 strength, mowing down thousands of trees in this rural area. As the tornado struck a farm, a home and two chicken houses were completely obliterated and swept away. A heavy propane tank was lofted and thrown 100 yards (91 m) from one of the chicken houses, and 19 cattle on the property were killed. Remarkably, a family of four taking shelter inside the house were completely unharmed. Three people were killed in a home southwest of Flat Rock. The Shiloh Community Church in the Higdon area was hit by the tornado; the same church would be struck by another tornado in 2020. Three tornadoes would move over this general area in a ten-hour span, the deadliest being the Flat Rock-Trenton EF4.

The tornado maintained EF4 strength as it tore through the rural community of Shiloh, sweeping away numerous mobile homes and block foundation homes and killing five people at that location. Thousands of trees were snapped, a log cabin was destroyed, livestock was killed, chicken houses were flattened, and a van was lofted and dropped into a field 400 yards (370 m) away from where it originated. The tornado then crossed then crossed into Georgia, immediately producing EF4-rated damage west of Workman Drive. As it crossed the road, more EF3 damage was inflicted to a home, which was completely destroyed. It maintained EF3 intensity as it passed over Bible Camp Road; the tornado's outer circulation struck the Vaught Lake area at EF0 to EF2 intensity. On County Road 301, the tornado destroyed another home with wind speeds that were estimated to have been as high as 150 miles per hour (240 km/h). To the northeast the tornado crossed Back Valley Road, where several homes were heavily damaged or destroyed.

The exterior walls of one home were collapsed inward by the tornado as it impacted the Whispering Pines Drive and Tanglewood Trail area. After crossing McKaig Road and Ashton Lane, the tornado impacted Interstate 59 and South Main Street. At this point along its track, the tornado was nearing downtown Trenton. It hit a neighborhood of homes on Pine Avenue, Oak Avenue and Walnut Avenue ease of the State Route; EF2 damage was inflcited to a residence located on Oak Wood Avenue. Dozens of homes in Trenton were either completely destroyed or sustained major damage, and tens of thousands of trees were downed in the area. A grocery store, two apartment complexes, and a funeral home were destroyed as well. The Dade Elementary School was damaged by the tornado, and the tornado left a path of damage that was visible several days after the event.

The tornado weakened to EF2 strength as it struck Flintstone further to the northeast, but still resulted in major damage. Numerous trees and power lines were downed, 7 homes were destroyed, 26 sustained major damage, and 35 sustained minor damage in the Flintstone area. The tornado continued northeast, weakening to EF0 strength before finally dissipating near Fort Oglethorpe. The tornado tracked along a 47-mile-long (76 km) path, at times up to 1,260 yards (1,150 m) wide.

== Aftermath ==
=== Damage, recovery efforts and studies ===
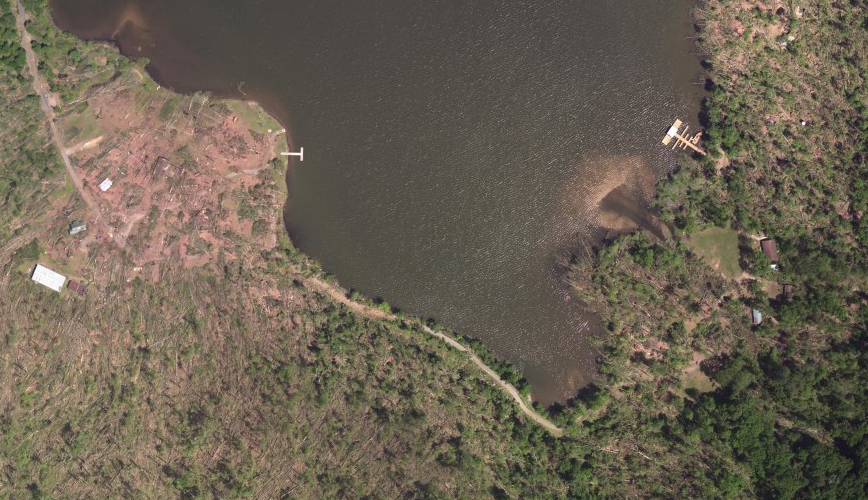
Camp Jackson, located in Jackson County, was heavily damaged by the tornado

Heavy damage was produced by the tornado in the Sand Mountain region of North Alabama. The Sand Mountain Bible Camp, located near Shiloh, was heavily damaged. Walker County Emergency Management and Walker County Emergency Services cleared debris from roadways and performed search-and-rescue operations in the Flintstone area; four EMA disaster centers were opened by the agency. In Trenton, the tornado resulted in the closure of several stores and businesses. the Trenton Ingles Supermarket remained closed for four months after the tornado, The Moore Funeral Home property was heavily affected by the tornado, although it was later rebuilt. In addition to business damage, several rental properties in Trenton suffered some form of damage from the tornado.

In Jackson County, the tornado impacted Camp Jackson, a child's summer camp. The camp remained closed for several years while repairs were done on the property, and Jackson County itself helped with rebuilding efforts. In DeKalb County, the Disaster Mortuary Operational Response Team worked to identify victims of the tornado and other tornadoes that struck that day.

=== Possible EF5 intensity ===
On January 23, 2025, Anthony W. Lyza with the National Severe Storms Laboratory along with Harold E. Brooks and Makenzie J. Kroca with the University of Oklahoma’s School of Meteorology published a paper to the American Meteorological Society, where they stated the tornado in Flat rock was an "EF5 candidate" and opined that the EF5 starting wind speed should be 190 mph (310 km/h) instead of 201 mph (323 km/h).

=== Casualties ===
List of fatalities from the tornado
Name	Age	State	County	Community	Circumstances of death	Ref.
Kathy Gray Haney	46	AL	Jackson	Pisgah	Haney died after being crushed under a piano when the tornado moved over County Road 359.	
Herbert Satterfield	90	AL	Jackson	Pisgah	Both died when the tornado impacted their home on County Road 369.	
Ann Satterfield	81	AL	Jackson	Pisgah	Both died when the tornado impacted their home on County Road 369.	
William Michaels	70	AL	Jackson	Higdon	Both died in the Higdon area when the tornado moved through.	
Martha Michaels	72	AL	Jackson	Higdon	Both died in the Higdon area when the tornado moved through.	
Linda Boatner	67	AL	Jackson	Higdon	Both died when the tornado struck near Higdon.	
Chelsie Black	20	AL	Jackson	Higdon	Both died when the tornado struck near Higdon.	
Janie Shannon	80	AL	Jackson	Flat Rock	Shannon died on County Road 95, located near Flat Rock.	
Shelby Jean Shannon	58	AL	Jackson	Flat Rock	All three died when the tornado directly impacted their home on County Road 95.	
Elease Whited	75	AL	Jackson	Flat Rock	All three died when the tornado directly impacted their home on County Road 95.	
John Whited	77	AL	Jackson	Flat Rock	All three died when the tornado directly impacted their home on County Road 95.	
Wayne White	68	AL	Jackson	Flat Rock	Both were killed in a fire the day after the tornado. The Birmingham News attributed both deaths to the tornado.	
Judith White	63	AL	Jackson	Flat Rock	Both were killed in a fire the day after the tornado. The Birmingham News attributed both deaths to the tornado.	
Jewell Ewing	73	AL	DeKalb	Rural area	Both died in rural DeKalb County during the tornado.	
Terry Tinker	50	AL	DeKalb	Rural area	Both died in rural DeKalb County during the tornado.	
Jerry Williams	49	GA	Dade	Trenton area	Williams was killed when the tornado impacted the Village Green Apartment Complex in Trenton.	
Donnie Walston	47	GA	Dade	Trenton area	Walston was killed in a trailer near Trenton.	

== See also ==
- List of tornadoes in the 2011 Super Outbreak
  - 2011 Cordova–Blountsville tornado, another EF4 tornado in Central Alabama with a similar casualty toll
