= Alabama State Route 71 =

State highway in Alabama, United States

State Route 71

Route information
- Maintained by ALDOT
- Length: 32.024 mi (51.538 km)

Major junctions
- South end: SR 35 at Section
- SR 117 at Flat Rock
- North end: SR 136 at the Georgia state line near Trenton, GA

Location
- Country: United States
- State: Alabama
- County: Jackson

Highway system
- Alabama State Highway System; Interstate; US; State
← SR 70	→ US 72

State Route 71 (SR 71) is a 32.024-mile-long (51.538 km) state highway in Jackson County in the northeastern corner of the U.S. state of Alabama. The southern terminus of the highway is at an intersection with SR 35 near Section. The highway continues until it reaches the Georgia state line, whereupon it continues as Georgia State Route 136 (SR 136).

== Route description ==
SR 71 begins at the point where SR 35 completes its climb up Sand Mountain. As the highway heads northeast from Section, it travels along a two-lane roadway that heads through rural areas of farms and woods in Jackson County. The highway travels through the town of Dutton and continues through more rural areas, reaching an intersection with SR 40 west of Henagar. Past this intersection, SR 71 begins its ascent into the foothills of Lookout Mountain, passing more farmland and woodland with occasional homes. The highway continues through the community of Rosalie. From there, the roadway has numerous curves as it travels through Flat Rock, where it crosses SR 117. SR 71 continues winding northeast through more rural areas as it reaches the community of Higdon. A short distance past Higdon, the highway intersects the southern terminus of SR 73 and makes a turn to the east. SR 71 continues east to the Georgia state line, where it continues as Georgia State Route 136.

== Major intersections ==
The entire route is in Jackson County.

Location	mi	km	Destinations	Notes
Section	0.000	0.000	SR 35 (Tammy Little Drive) – Scottsboro, Powell, Rainsville	Southern terminus
	7.094	11.417	SR 40 – Scottsboro, Henagar	
Flat Rock	21.469	34.551	SR 117 – Stevenson, Hammondville	
Higdon	30.168	48.551	SR 73 north – Bryant	Southern terminus of SR 73
	32.024	51.538	SR 136 east – Chattanooga	Georgia state line; northern terminus
1.000 mi = 1.609 km; 1.000 km = 0.621 mi
