= Alabama State Route 40 =

State highway in Alabama, United States

State Route 40

Route information
- Maintained by ALDOT
- Length: 21.184 mi (34.092 km)
- Existed: 1958–present

Major junctions
- West end: SR 35 south of Scottsboro
- SR 71 near Dutton; SR 75 at Henagar
- East end: SR 117 at Hammondville

Location
- Country: United States
- State: Alabama

Highway system
- Alabama State Highway System; Interstate; US; State
| ← SR 39 | → SR 41 |

State Route 40 (SR 40) is a 21.184-mile-long (34.092 km) state highway in the northeastern part of the U.S. state of Alabama. The western terminus of the highway is at its intersection with SR 35 near Scottsboro. The eastern terminus of the highway is at its intersection with SR 117 at Hammondville, just north of the intersection of SR 117 with Interstate 59 (I-59).

== Route description ==
SR 40 travels across the base of Lookout Mountain. The narrow, twisty roadway continues until the highway reaches Dutton in western DeKalb County. East of Dutton, the roadway has fewer curves as it continues across the county. While SR 40 does not directly have an interchange with I-59, there is direct access to I-59 via SR 117 approximately 1 mile (1.6 km) southeast of the eastern terminus of the highway.

== Major intersections ==
| County | Location | mi | km | Destinations | Notes |
|---|---|---|---|---|---|
| Jackson | | 0.000 | 0.000 | SR 35 – Section, Scottsboro | Western terminus |
| Jackson | | 6.936 | 11.162 | SR 71 – Trenton, Section, Pisgah | |
| DeKalb | Henagar | 14.941 | 24.045 | SR 75 – Trenton, Rainsville | |
| DeKalb | | 21.184 | 34.092 | SR 117 | Eastern terminus |
1.000 mi = 1.609 km; 1.000 km = 0.621 mi
