= Cast King =

American country musician and songwriter

Joseph D. "Cast" King (February 16, 1926 – December 13, 2007) was a country musician and songwriter from Old Sand Mountain, Alabama. King released the album, "Saw Mill Man", in 2005. He was aged 79 at the time of recording. A song from the album entitled "Outlaw" was included in the score of Gus Van Sant's 2007 film, Paranoid Park. "Saw Mill Man" drew comparisons to Johnny Cash's American Recordings series. King's baritone voice and acoustic guitar have been praised as possessing a raw and affecting quality. The narratives of the songs dealt with characteristic country themes such as poverty, broken relationships, and murderous outlaws. Although his opportunity to record a full-length album came late in life, Cast King had previously recorded for Sun Records in 1955. With his band, The Country Drifters, he cut around a dozen songs at this time. It was musician, Matt Downer, who located King and encouraged him to come out of a long musical retirement and record. Downer also played electric guitar throughout "Saw Mill Man". The record was met with favourable reviews from Rolling Stone, Arthur Magazine, Mojo, and No Depression among other publications. King was preparing a second collection of songs when it was discovered that he was suffering from cancer. He died at the age of 81 on December 13, 2007.
