= Hammondville =

Hammondville may refer to the following places:

- Hammondville, Alabama, United States
- Hammondville, New South Wales, a suburb of Sydney, Australia
