= Tornado outbreak of November 27–30, 2016 =

Weather event in the United States

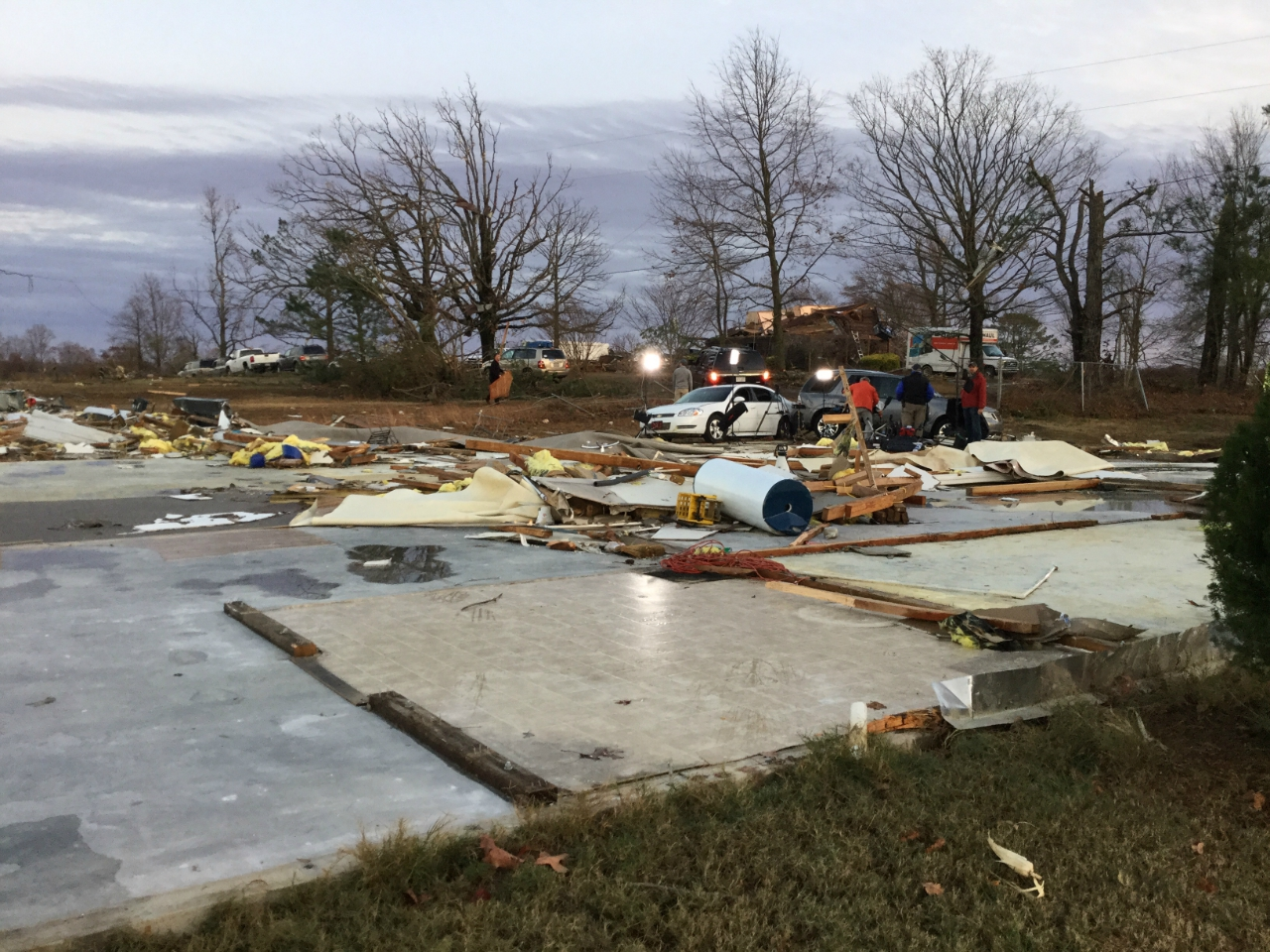
- Remains of a daycare center that was swept away by an EF3 tornado near Ider, Alabama.

Meteorological history
- Formed: November 27, 2016
- Dissipated: November 30, 2016

Tornado outbreak
- Tornadoes: 48
- Max. rating: EF3 tornado
- Duration: 3 days, 1 hour, 27 minutes
- Highest winds: Tornadic - 145 miles per hour (233 km/h) Ider, Alabama on November 30. Straight-line - 90 miles per hour (140 km/h) Grenada County, Mississippi.
- Largest hail: 2.75 in (7.0 cm) Central Mississippi

Overall effects
- Fatalities: 6
- Injuries: 55
- Damage: Per NOAA: $3.7 million Per Aon: $275 million
- Areas affected: Southern and Central United States
- Part of the 2016–17 North American winter and Tornado outbreaks of 2016

A deadly tornado outbreak severely impacted the Southern United States, and also affected Iowa and Nebraska to a lesser extent, between November 27–30, 2016. The strongest tornadoes of the event affected Alabama and Tennessee during the late evening of November 29 and into the early morning hours of November 30. Overall, this outbreak produced 48 tornadoes, killed six people, and injured many others.

== Meteorological synopsis ==
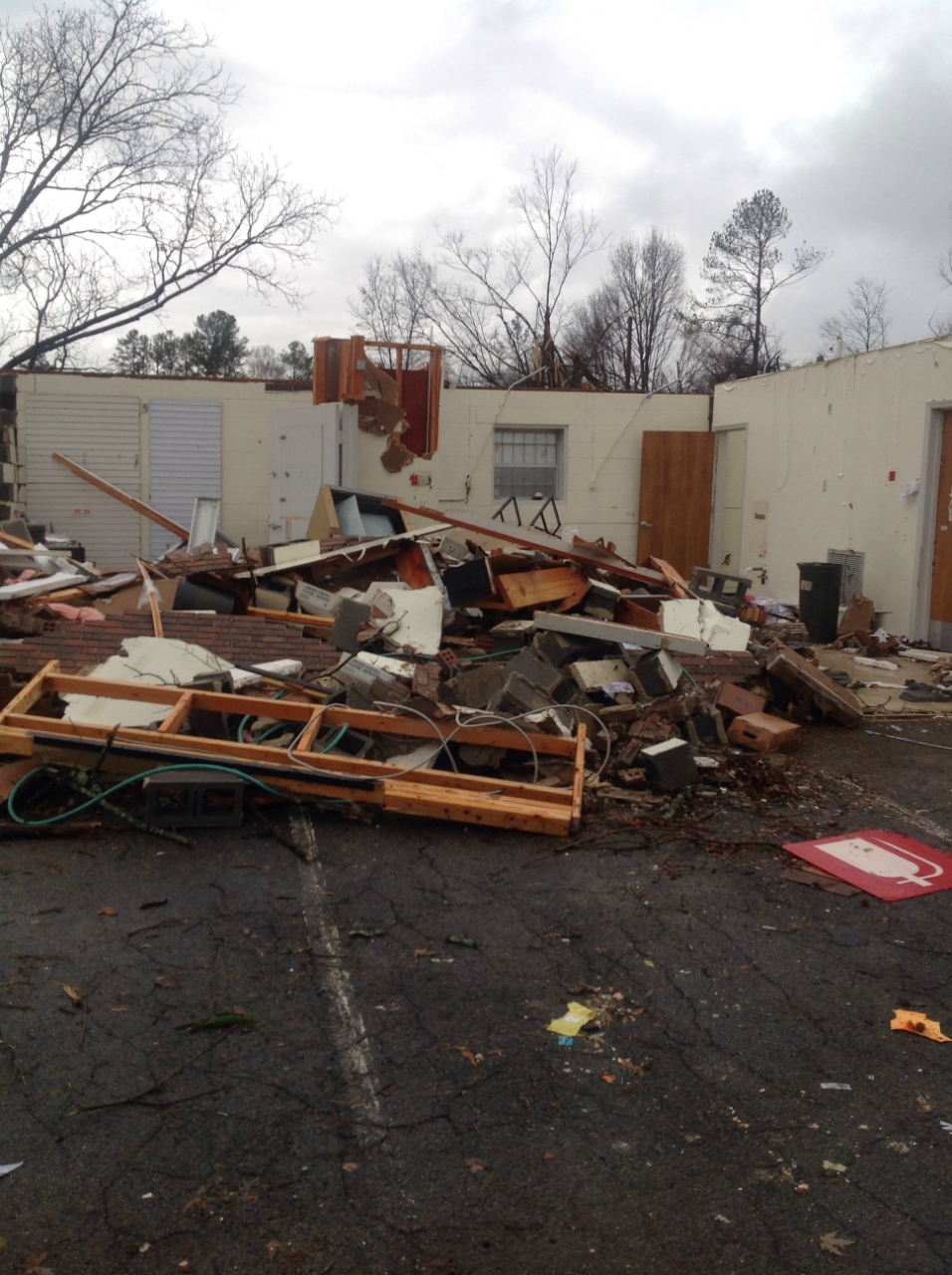
EF3 damage to a post office building in Ocoee, TN.

On November 27, a storm system produced two EF0 tornadoes and an EF1 tornado in South Central Nebraska, causing minor damage. On November 28, the Storm Prediction Center (SPC) issued an Enhanced risk of severe weather for Louisiana and Mississippi. Only one tornado touched down in the threat area, a brief EF0 tornado that remained over a rice field near Marksville, Louisiana. However, the surface low associated with system produced a few EF0 tornadoes in Iowa. Minor damage occurred in the towns of Radcliffe and Parkersburg, the latter of which was devastated by an EF5 tornado in May 2008.

The next day, the SPC issued a Moderate risk for central Mississippi and portions of Louisiana, Alabama, and Tennessee. This included a large 10% hatched risk area for tornadoes, and a smaller 15% hatched risk area for tornadoes across northern Mississippi. Throughout the late afternoon and evening, multiple supercell thunderstorms developed. Hail and winds battered Mississippi, and several EF1 tornadoes caused minor to moderate damage in rural areas of the state. After sunset, the event rapidly escalated into a significant outbreak as the intensifying supercell thunderstorms pushed into Alabama, and significant tornadoes began touching down. An EF2 tornado near Belgreen snapped many trees and injured one person when a house was damaged and shifted on its foundation. Two EF2 tornadoes moved through Winston County and heavily damaged or destroyed multiple homes, mobile homes, and outbuildings, and also snapped numerous trees and power poles near Arley and Double Springs. An EF2 tornado touched down over Monte Sano Mountain in eastern Huntsville, snapping and uprooting many trees, and damaging numerous homes as it passed through several subdivisions, a few of which had roofs torn off. A horse-riding arena was also destroyed by the Huntsville area tornado. An EF3 tornado passed near the towns of Danville and Neel, causing major structural damage to industrial buildings, homes and a fire station. A motorcycle shop was leveled, vehicles were tossed, and several mobile homes were completely destroyed as well. At around midnight and into the very early morning hours of November 30, the storms moved into northeastern Alabama and southern Tennessee. A powerful EF3 tornado ripped directly through the town of Rosalie and to the north of Ider, killing four people and injuring nine others. The Rosalie/Ider tornado destroyed homes and mobile homes, churches, and businesses along its path. A shopping plaza in Rosalie was leveled by the tornado, and a daycare center near Ider was reduced to a bare slab. Further to the north, strong tornadoes were impacting communities in Tennessee, including another EF3 tornado that severely damaged the town of Ocoee. The Ocoee post office and fire station were destroyed, two people were killed in town, a cell phone tower and a metal truss tower were knocked down, and 20 people were injured. A high-end EF2 tornado struck Athens, destroying several businesses and manufactured homes, heavily damaging a large church complex, and injuring 20 people. A few homes sustained major structural damage and a double-wide mobile home was completely destroyed by another high-end EF2 tornado that passed near Whitwell and Dunlap. After sunrise, additional weaker tornadoes touched down in Louisiana, Alabama, Georgia, Florida, and South Carolina. This included several brief tornadoes that caused minor to moderate damage in and around Atlanta. A high-end EF1 tornado downed many trees and damaged numerous homes in Simpsonville, South Carolina as well before the outbreak came to an end.

== Confirmed tornadoes ==
Confirmed tornadoes by Enhanced Fujita rating
| EFU | EF0 | EF1 | EF2 | EF3 | EF4 | EF5 | Total |
|---|---|---|---|---|---|---|---|
| 0 | 16 | 23 | 6 | 3 | 0 | 0 | 48 |

=== November 27 event ===
List of confirmed tornadoes – Sunday, November 27, 2016 (Note: All dates are based on the local time zone where the tornado touched down; however, all times are in Coordinated Universal Time for consistency.)
| EF# | Location | County / Parish | State | Start Coord. | Time (UTC) | Path length | Max width | Damage (Note: All damage totals are in 2016 USD unless otherwise stated.) | Summary | Refs |
|---|---|---|---|---|---|---|---|---|---|---|
| EF0 | WSW of Upland | Franklin | NE | 40.3°N 98.95°W | 2202–2204 | 0.53 mi (0.85 km) | 20 yd (18 m) | $0 | A damage survey indicated a brief tornado touchdown. | |
| EF1 | E of Red Cloud | Webster | NE | 40.09°N 98.47°W | 2232–2239 | 3.79 mi (6.10 km) | 60 yd (55 m) | $150,000 | A tornado occurred over mostly rural farmland and forest. A few large hardwood trees were uprooted, power poles downed, and a watering pivot was damaged. An outbuilding was flipped over, and debris splatter was noted at a house. | |
| EF0 | E of Lawrence | Nuckolls | NE | 40.27°N 98.15°W | 2300–2305 | 4.2 mi (6.8 km) | 50 yd (46 m) | $3,000 | Some power poles were lightly damaged, and an animal feeder was tossed across a road, leaving it mangled. | |

=== November 28 event ===
List of confirmed tornadoes – Monday, November 28, 2016
| EF# | Location | County / Parish | State | Start Coord. | Time (UTC) | Path length | Max width | Damage | Summary | Refs |
|---|---|---|---|---|---|---|---|---|---|---|
| EF0 | Radcliffe | Hardin | IA | 42.317°N 93.4274°W | 1844–1855 | 5.22 mi (8.40 km) | 50 yd (46 m) | $5,000 | Tree limbs and power lines were downed in town. A few homes sustained roof damage, and a pickup truck was tipped on its side. | |
| EF0 | Eastern Parkersburg | Grundy, Butler | IA | 42.5248°N 92.8034°W | 2138–2150 | 5.68 mi (9.14 km) | 50 yd (46 m) | $3,000 | Minor roof damage occurred at the east edge of town, and a shed was blown off of its cinder block foundation. | |
| EF0 | W of Grundy Center | Grundy | IA | 42.3463°N 92.834°W | 2141–2144 | 1.47 mi (2.37 km) | 25 yd (23 m) | $0 | Minor tree damage occurred. | |
| EF0 | NE of New Sharon | Mahaska, Poweshiek | IA | 41.4947°N 92.6257°W | 2211–2221 | 4.54 mi (7.31 km) | 40 yd (37 m) | $0 | A tornado debris signature was evident on radar; little damage occurred. | |
| EF0 | SE of Marksville | Avoyelles | LA | 31.073°N 92.0329°W | 2225 | 0.01 mi (0.016 km) | 10 yd (9.1 m) | $0 | An emergency manager reported a brief tornado in an open field. | |
| EF0 | SE of Montezuma | Poweshiek | IA | 41.5648°N 92.5098°W | 2230–2233 | 1.17 mi (1.88 km) | 30 yd (27 m) | $0 | Law enforcement reported a brief tornado. | |

=== November 29 event ===
List of confirmed tornadoes – Tuesday, November 29, 2016
| EF# | Location | County / Parish | State | Start Coord. | Time (UTC) | Path length | Max width | Damage | Summary | Refs |
|---|---|---|---|---|---|---|---|---|---|---|
| EF1 | NNE of Pelahatchie to E of Walnut Grove | Rankin, Scott, Leake | MS | 32.4020°N 89.7807°W | 2157–2237 | 23.95 mi (38.54 km) | 300 yd (270 m) | $200,000 | A few homes were damaged by fallen trees and some sustained minor roof damage, several sheds or outbuildings were destroyed, and some power lines were downed. Trees were snapped or uprooted along the path. | |
| EF1 | N of Preston to NNW of Gholson | Winston, Noxubee | MS | 32.95°N 88.84°W | 2349–0000 | 5.53 mi (8.90 km) | 170 yd (160 m) | $180,000 | One mobile home was heavily damaged, two others had skirting blown out, and a large tractor shed was destroyed. One home had a tree downed on it, some power lines were downed, and trees were snapped or uprooted along the path. | |
| EF1 | E of Oktoc | Oktibbeha | MS | 33.30°N 88.76°W | 2352–2358 | 3.59 mi (5.78 km) | 150 yd (140 m) | $45,000 | Minor structural and roof damage occurred to several residences and minor to moderate tree damage occurred. | |
| EF1 | NE of Palo Alto to SE of Prairie | Clay, Monroe | MS | 33.70°N 88.76°W | 0012–0025 | 8.9 mi (14.3 km) | 200 yd (180 m) | $220,000 | One structure sustained roof damage and minor to moderate tree damage occurred. | |
| EF2 | NNW of Belgreen to NW of Littleville | Franklin, Colbert | AL | 34.5415°N 87.9038°W | 0105–0123 | 10.87 mi (17.49 km) | 100 yd (91 m) | Unknown | The tornado touched down on the northeast side of the Cedar Creek Reservoir, where a home lost a significant amount of roofing material and was shifted on its foundation, injuring the one occupant, and some power poles were snapped. Farther along the path, a single-wide manufactured home had its roof and walls destroyed, where two people were injured, another manufactured home was damaged, and a home had its roof uplifted. Many trees were also snapped along the path. | |
| EF1 | NE of Ethelsville to S of Millport | Pickens | AL | 33.4521°N 88.1502°W | 0115–0125 | 5.3 mi (8.5 km) | 600 yd (550 m) | $0 | Numerous trees were snapped or uprooted along the path, and several outbuildings were either damaged or destroyed. | |
| EF0 | N of Gu-Win to NNE of Brilliant | Marion | AL | 34.0002°N 87.8754°W | 0129–0143 | 10.6 mi (17.1 km) | 150 yd (140 m) | $0 | Trees and small outhouses were damaged along the 10 1/2 Mile path. Ping Pong Ball sized hail was also reported with this cell on AL-253, inflicting minor damage to shed-tops and shingles. | |
| EF1 | E of Haleyville | Winston | AL | 34.2498°N 87.5383°W | 0204–0206 | 0.4 mi (0.64 km) | 100 yd (91 m) | $0 | One home sustained roof damage, a metal pole barn was destroyed with debris scattered across a field, and several power poles were snapped. One garage sustained minor roof damage, some garage doors were blown in, and trees were blown down or snapped. | |
| EF0 | SE of Hubbertville | Fayette | AL | 33.7722°N 87.6959°W | 0206–0207 | 0.3 mi (0.48 km) | 50 yd (46 m) | $0 | Brief touchdown occurred along Alabama Highway 102 which knocked down some trees and did minor roof damage to an outbuilding. | |
| EF2 | NW of Double Springs | Winston | AL | 34.1946°N 87.4701°W | 0206–0212 | 3.2 mi (5.1 km) | 300 yd (270 m) | $0 | Two mobile homes and an outbuilding were completely destroyed, some homes and other structures were damaged, and a chicken house was heavily damaged. A car was moved 20 feet, and a truck was rolled 50 yards. Numerous trees were blown down, snapped, or uprooted, and many power poles were blown down as well. | |
| EF1 | SE of Bent Oak to SSW of Columbus | Lowndes | MS | 33.404°N 88.4813°W | 0212–0219 | 3.48 mi (5.60 km) | 100 yd (91 m) | $50,000 | A farm pivot was heavily damaged and minor to moderate tree damage occurred. | |
| EF3 | N of Danville to NE of Neel | Morgan | AL | 34.4406°N 87.0913°W | 0240–0248 | 6.2 mi (10.0 km) | 175 yd (160 m) | Unknown | Frame homes had their roofs ripped off, one of which had a wall blown out. Mobile homes were destroyed with debris scattered up to 100 yards away, outbuildings and chicken houses were destroyed, and metal industrial buildings were severely damaged. The Neel Volunteer Fire Department building lost much of its roof, with large metal girders bent. A motorcycle shop was leveled with motorcycles thrown and destroyed, and a nearby car was rolled 75 yards. Steel beams from the shop were thrown 400 yards into a house, severely damaging it. A convenience store was also damaged, and many trees and power poles were snapped. | |
| EF2 | SSE of Arley to SSW of Jones Chapel | Winston, Cullman | AL | 34.0699°N 87.2016°W | 0252–0307 | 9.51 mi (15.30 km) | 1,000 yd (910 m) | Unknown | Four homes were destroyed, at least a dozen other homes sustained structural damage, and several sheds and outbuildings were damaged by this high-end EF2 wedge tornado. A 1/4 mile (0.40 km) stretch of concrete power poles were snapped and numerous trees were snapped or uprooted. A fire department training building was destroyed in Helicon. In Cullman County, the tornado caused significant damage to a barn, destroyed a shed, and snapped some trees before dissipating. | |
| EF1 | W of Tullahoma to SW of Manchester | Coffee | TN | 35.3584°N 86.2447°W | 0305–0315 | 7.99 mi (12.86 km) | 300 yd (270 m) | $750,000 | Several businesses sustained roof damage in Tullahoma, and hundreds of trees were downed in residential areas, many of which landed on homes. One person was injured when a tree fell on their car. | |
| EF1 | ESE of Manchester | Coffee | TN | 35.4572°N 86.0559°W | 0324–0329 | 3.51 mi (5.65 km) | 200 yd (180 m) | $250,000 | A log cabin style home was moved 6–8 ft (1.8–2.4 m) off its foundation, although it was not properly attached, and several barns and outbuildings were heavily damaged. Several dozen trees were snapped and uprooted as well. | |
| EF2 | Eastern Huntsville to N of Princeton | Madison, Jackson | AL | 34.74°N 86.53°W | 0329–0400 | 19.85 mi (31.95 km) | 150 yd (140 m) | Unknown | Numerous trees were snapped at Monte Sano Mountain near the beginning of the path before the tornado passed through multiple residential subdivisions and damaged numerous homes, a few of which had their roofs ripped off. A horse riding arena and several outbuildings were destroyed, and many more trees and power poles were snapped further along the path before the tornado dissipated near Putman Mountain. | |
| EF1 | ENE of Estillfork to W of Hytop | Jackson | AL | 34.92°N 86.14°W | 0402–0407 | 0.9 mi (1.4 km) | 40 yd (37 m) | $0 | Some pine trees were snapped. | |
| EF1 | SSE of Addison to SW of Jones Chapel | Winston, Cullman | AL | 34.1550°N 87.1572°W | 0405–0425 | 3.15 mi (5.07 km) | 100 yd (91 m) | Unknown | A mobile home was rolled over and destroyed, a house sustained roof damage, a garage was significantly damaged, and a carport was damaged as well. Several other structures including barns and sheds were also damaged. Numerous trees and tree limbs were snapped along the path. | |
| EF1 | WNW of Higdon to SSW of Bryant | Jackson | AL | 34.87°N 85.71°W | 0500–0503 | 2.31 mi (3.72 km) | 150 yd (140 m) | $0 | Softwood trees and large branches were snapped. | |
| EF2 | NNE of Whitwell to SE of Dunlap | Marion, Sequatchie | TN | 35.2481°N 85.4459°W | 0503–0512 | 8.15 mi (13.12 km) | 350 yd (320 m) | Unknown | This high-end EF2 tornado touched down in northern Marion County, and strengthened as it crossed into Sequatchie County. A double-wide mobile home was completely destroyed and the roof of a church was heavily damaged. A grove of trees were nearly all snapped halfway up the trunk, and a two-story family home on a farm sustained significant damage, losing its roof and several exterior walls. Farther along the path, two more homes were heavily damaged before the tornado lifted. Two people were injured. | |
| EF1 | NW of Union Grove | Marshall | AL | 34.4315°N 86.5032°W | 0505–0511 | 1.2 mi (1.9 km) | 50 yd (46 m) | Unknown | One home had its roof uplifted and blown into a field, another sustained damage when a RV was flipped into the home, destroying the vehicle, and two homes were damaged by falling trees. A double-wide mobile home sustained minor roof damage, a storage shed had its roof lifted off and trees were snapped or uprooted along the path. | |
| EF1 | WSW of Lamar County Airport to S of Beaverton | Lamar | AL | 33.8255°N 88.1623°W | 0540–0553 | 9.69 mi (15.59 km) | 600 yd (550 m) | $0 | Multiple outbuildings, two hangars, and three small airplanes were destroyed. Several mobile homes and a restaurant were damaged to a lesser degree, and numerous trees and tree limbs were snapped. | |

=== November 30 event ===
List of confirmed tornadoes – Wednesday, November 30, 2016
| EF# | Location | County / Parish | State | Start Coord. | Time (UTC) | Path length | Max width | Damage | Summary | Refs |
|---|---|---|---|---|---|---|---|---|---|---|
| EF1 | SE of Guin to W of Natural Bridge | Marion | AL | 33.9518°N 87.9005°W | 0601–0624 | 16.85 mi (27.12 km) | 900 yd (820 m) | Unknown | Homes and mobile homes sustained minor damage, and many trees and tree limbs were snapped along the path. Outbuildings were impacted as well, including a barn that was heavily damaged. A restaurant between Guin and Gu-Win sustained significant roof damage. | |
| EF3 | SW of Rosalie to NW of Rising Fawn, GA | Jackson, DeKalb | AL | 34.69°N 85.78°W | 0602–0620 | 13.48 mi (21.69 km) | 206 yd (188 m) | Unknown | 4 deaths – In Rosalie, a poorly constructed shopping plaza collapsed, frame homes and other structures were heavily damaged, and a church and several mobile homes were destroyed. The most severe damage occurred to the north of Ider, where a daycare center was swept clean from its foundation. Surveyors noted that the structure's base plating was rotted from termites. Elsewhere along the path, frame homes sustained significant roof and exterior wall loss, mobile homes and chicken houses were destroyed with debris scattered downwind, and a large metal industrial building was heavily damaged. Barns and outbuildings were destroyed, and numerous trees and power poles were snapped. Three fatalities occurred when a mobile home was obliterated, and another person later died of their injuries. Nine other people were injured. | |
| EF2 | SSW of Athens to E of Niota | McMinn | TN | 35.4046°N 84.6371°W | 0620–0630 | 11.33 mi (18.23 km) | 200 yd (180 m) | Unknown | This high-end EF2 tornado caused significant damage to homes and businesses in Athens, including a Save-A-Lot store that was partially destroyed. A covered walkway was destroyed, and four buildings were heavily damaged while another was destroyed at a large church complex. Numerous manufactured homes were destroyed in the Deerfield Estates subdivision, a few of which were obliterated. Many trees and power lines were downed along the path and 20 people were injured. | |
| EF0 | NE of Ringgold | Catoosa | GA | 34.9393°N 85.1015°W | 0656–0658 | 1.29 mi (2.08 km) | 225 yd (206 m) | $50,000 | Homes sustained roof, siding, and garage door damage with debris scattered up to 500 yards away. Several trees were downed as well. | |
| EF3 | SSW of Ocoee to SW of Benton | Polk | TN | 35.1109°N 84.7264°W | 0728–0733 | 4.6 mi (7.4 km) | 155 yd (142 m) | Unknown | 2 deaths – The tornado touched down south of Ocoee before moving into town, heavily damaging several structures and snapping many trees. The brick Ocoee post office building had its roof torn off and exterior walls collapsed, and several manufactured homes were destroyed. A fire station sustained loss of its roof and collapse of its cinder block walls. A cell phone tower and a metal truss tower were toppled over as well. The two fatalities occurred in a manufactured home. The tornado weakened and snapped off the tops of several pine trees before lifting near Benton. 20 other people were injured. | |
| EF0 | SE of Hytop to WNW of Stevenson | Jackson | AL | 34.87°N 85.99°W | 0811–0817 | 3.4 mi (5.5 km) | 30 yd (27 m) | Unknown | A large farm shed sustained roof damage and tree damage occurred, with numerous large tree branches damaged. | |
| EF1 | WSW of Faunsdale to SSE of Newbern | Marengo, Hale | AL | 32.4233°N 87.6657°W | 1110–1132 | 12.93 mi (20.81 km) | 250 yd (230 m) | $0 | Many trees were snapped and uprooted along the path. | |
| EF0 | Westwego | Jefferson | LA | 29.9096°N 90.1428°W | 1445–1447 | 0.76 mi (1.22 km) | 30 yd (27 m) | Unknown | A weak tornado struck Westwego, damaging the roofs of five homes, and tearing the carport off of another. Tree limbs were snapped, a power pole was bent over, and a warehouse sustained roof and garage door damage. | |
| EF0 | Mary Esther | Okaloosa | FL | 30.4105°N 86.6812°W | 1638–1640 | 0.77 mi (1.24 km) | 175 yd (160 m) | $50,000 | This tornado began as a waterspout before moving ashore. A house had part of its overhanging roof ripped off, while another sustained significant damage to a sunroom. Sporadic tree and power line damage occurred as well. | |
| EF0 | W of Bowdon Junction to SE of Bremen | Carroll | GA | 33.6646°N 85.1613°W | 1753–1758 | 4.02 mi (6.47 km) | 100 yd (91 m) | $8,000 | Several trees were snapped or uprooted and tree limbs were downed. | |
| EF1 | E of Camp Hill to E of Waverly | Lee, Chambers | AL | 32.7056°N 85.5591°W | 1835–1840 | 3.22 mi (5.18 km) | 300 yd (270 m) | $0 | Minor structural damage occurred and many trees were snapped and uprooted. | |
| EF1 | Southeastern Mableton | Cobb | GA | 33.7786°N 84.5406°W | 1839–1841 | 0.46 mi (0.74 km) | 100 yd (91 m) | $50,000 | Part of a metal warehouse building was heavily damaged, with metal siding and roofing scattered up to a quarter-mile away. A tractor-trailer was flipped over onto its side, trees were snapped and uprooted, and a metal light pole was snapped. Part of a wooden power pole was pulled out of the ground as well. | |
| EF1 | Northern Atlanta | Fulton | GA | 33.8376°N 84.4277°W | 1850–1854 | 1.9 mi (3.1 km) | 100 yd (91 m) | $25,000 | Numerous trees were snapped along the path. | |
| EF0 | Eastern Alpharetta to N of Johns Creek | Fulton, Forsyth | GA | 34.0905°N 84.2336°W | 1907–1913 | 2.93 mi (4.72 km) | 100 yd (91 m) | $16,000 | Several trees were snapped or uprooted and a traffic light was damaged. | |
| EF1 | NNW of Commerce | Jackson, Banks | GA | 34.2322°N 83.5025°W | 2004–2011 | 2.8 mi (4.5 km) | 100 yd (91 m) | $65,000 | Poultry feed bins were moved and tree limbs were downed. Two street signs were bent over, two large overhead garage doors were blown in at a trailer sales business. This structure also sustained roof damage and had its front door ripped off, and several automotive trailers were rolled about 50 feet. Several large business signs were blown out before the tornado dissipated. | |
| EF1 | Simpsonville | Greenville, Spartanburg | SC | 34.678°N 82.378°W | 2141–2202 | 16.44 mi (26.46 km) | 150 yd (140 m) | $500,000 | This rain-wrapped, high-end EF1 tornado damaged numerous homes in Simpsonville, some significantly. Sheds, greenhouses, garages and outbuildings were damaged or destroyed. Mobile homes were also damaged, and many power lines, trees, and tree limbs were downed, some of which landed on homes. | |
| EF1 | NW of Pineville | Mecklenburg | NC | 35.124°N 80.953°W | 2326–2329 | 2.37 mi (3.81 km) | 150 yd (140 m) | $100,000 | Numerous trees were downed, a mobile home was shifted off its foundation, and a tractor trailer was overturned. Various buildings, including a few homes, sustained minor damage mainly in the form of siding and shingle removal. | |

== See also ==
- Weather of 2016
- List of North American tornadoes and tornado outbreaks
