= Beaty Crossroads, Alabama =

Unincorporated community in Alabama, United States

- Neighborhood
- Location within Alabama
- Coordinates: 34°41′44″N 085°40′10″W
- Country: United States
- State: Alabama
- County: DeKalb
- Elevation: 1,601 ft (488 m)
- Time zone: UTC-6 (Central (CST))
  - Summer (DST): UTC-5 (CDT)
- ZIP code: 35981
- Area code: 256
- GNIS ID: 150083

Beaty Crossroads is a former unincorporated community on Sand Mountain in northern DeKalb County, Alabama, United States. It is located within the town limits of Ider at the intersection of Alabama Highway 75 and Alabama Highway 117.

== History ==
It is believed Beaty Crossroads was named after Oliver Beaty, teacher and founder of the nearby Beaty School.

== Geography ==
Adamsburg is located at 34°41′44″N 085°40′10″W. Its average elevation is 1,601 feet (488 m) above sea level.
