= Dennis Covington =

American author (1948–2024)

- Born: October 30, 1948 Birmingham, Alabama, U.S.
- Died: April 14, 2024 (aged 75) Lubbock, Texas, U.S.
- Military career
- Allegiance: United States of America
- Branch: United States Army
- Service years: 1970–72

Dennis Covington (October 30, 1948 – April 14, 2024) was an American author whose work included two novels and four nonfiction books. His subject matter includes spirituality, the environment, and the South. Covington's book Salvation on Sand Mountain was a 1995 National Book Award finalist and his articles have been published in The New York Times, Vogue and Redbook.

== Life and career ==
Covington was born in Birmingham, Alabama, studied fiction writing and earned a BA degree from the University of Virginia, then served in the U.S. Army. He earned an MFA in the early 1970s from the Iowa Writers' Workshop, studying under Raymond Carver. He taught English at the College of Wooster. He married his second wife, writer Vicki Covington, in 1977. The couple returned to Birmingham the following year, and he began teaching at the University of Alabama at Birmingham. The couple divorced in 2005. They have two daughters and three grandchildren.

In 1983, Dennis Covington went to El Salvador as a freelance journalist. In 2003, he became Professor of Creative Writing at Texas Tech University. In 2005, he was a judge for the National Book Awards. Covington spoke at a talk hosted by the University of Central Florida's literary magazine The Cypress Dome in 2009.

In 1996 Covington received the Stavis Playwriting Award from the National Theatre Conference for his play Lizard based on his novel with the same name.

In November 2017, Covington started his column called “Deep in the Heart,” published online by The American Scholar. He wrote a total of 20 mini-essays on life in Texas, family, lost love, health issues, and his childhood in Alabama. Covington’s essays were well-received.

Covington died in Lubbock, Texas, from complications from Lewy body dementia on April 14, 2024, at the age of 75.

== Works ==
- Lizard, New York: Delacorte Press, 1991. For younger readers.
- Lasso the Moon, New York: Delacorte Press, 1995. For younger readers.
- Salvation on Sand Mountain: Snake Handling and Salvation in Southern Appalachia, Reading, Mass.: Addison-Wesley, 1995, ISBN 978-0-14-025458-7
- Cleaving: The Story of a Marriage (with Vicki Covington), New York: North Point Press, 1999.
- Redneck Riviera: Armadillos, Outlaws, and the Demise of an American Dream, New York: Counterpoint, 2004.
- Revelation: A Search for Faith in a Violent Religious World, New York: Little Brown & Company, 2016.

== Excerpts in anthologies ==
- From "Snake Handling and Redemption", The Art of Fact, Kevin Kerrane, Ben Yagoda, Simon and Schuster, 1998, ISBN 978-0-684-84630-9
- "From Salvation on Sand Mountain", The Oxford Book of the American South, Edward L. Ayers, Bradley C. Mittendorf, Oxford University Press US, 1997, ISBN 978-0-19-512493-4
