= Dutton, Alabama =

- Town
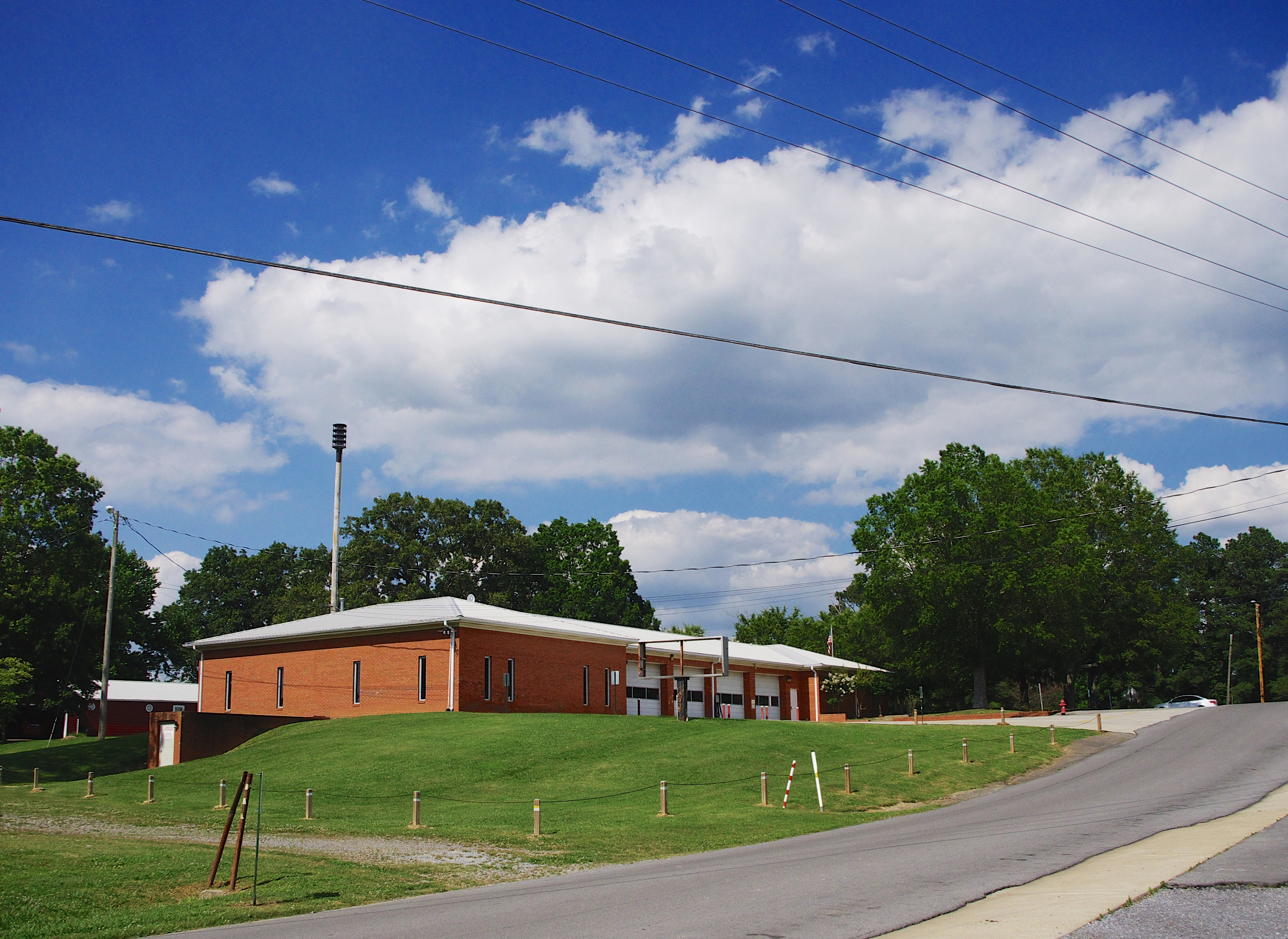
- Dutton Town Hall and Fire Department

- Location of Dutton in Jackson County, Alabama.
- Coordinates: 34°36′27″N 85°54′56″W
- Country: United States
- State: Alabama
- County: Jackson

Area
  - Total: 0.86 sq mi (2.24 km^{2})
  - Land: 0.86 sq mi (2.24 km^{2})
  - Water: 0 sq mi (0.00 km^{2})
- Elevation: 1,368 ft (417 m)

Population (2020)
  - Total: 330
  - Density: 381.9/sq mi (147.47/km^{2})
- Time zone: UTC-6 (Central (CST))
  - Summer (DST): UTC-5 (CDT)
- ZIP code: 35744
- Area code: 256
- FIPS code: 01-21952
- GNIS feature ID: 0117699

Dutton is a town in Jackson County, Alabama, United States. It was incorporated in 1963. As of the 2020 census, Dutton had a population of 330. Dutton is located atop Sand Mountain.

== History ==
Dutton was founded in 1888, and was initially known by several different names, including "Press," "Barnes," "Callahan," and "Fern Hill." When urged by the U.S. Postal Service to choose a permanent name in 1896, the town chose "Dutton" in honor of a prominent local businessman.

== Geography ==
Dutton is located at 34°36′28″N 85°54′56″W (34.607639, -85.915563). The town is situated along State Route 71 between Section and Pisgah, near the western edge of Sand Mountain.

According to the U.S. Census Bureau, the town has a total area of 0.9 square miles (2.3 km^{2}), all land.

== Demographics ==
Historical population
Census	Pop.	Note	%±
1970	423		—
1980	276		−34.8%
1990	243		−12.0%
2000	310		27.6%
2010	315		1.6%
2020	330		4.8%
U.S. Decennial Census; 2013 Estimate

As of the census of 2000, there were 310 people, 120 households, and 87 families residing in the town. The population density was 360.6 inhabitants per square mile (139.2/km^{2}). There were 137 housing units at an average density of 159.4 per square mile (61.5/km^{2}). The racial makeup of the town was 97.10% White, 2.26% Native American, and 0.65% from two or more races. 0.65% of the population were Hispanic or Latino of any race.

There were 120 households, out of which 36.7% had children under the age of 18 living with them, 60.8% were married couples living together, 7.5% had a female householder with no husband present, and 27.5% were non-families. 25.0% of all households were made up of individuals, and 14.2% had someone living alone who was 65 years of age or older. The average household size was 2.58 and the average family size was 3.08.

In the town, the population was spread out, with 26.8% under the age of 18, 6.8% from 18 to 24, 28.7% from 25 to 44, 25.8% from 45 to 64, and 11.9% who were 65 years of age or older. The median age was 34 years. For every 100 females, there were 90.2 males. For every 100 females age 18 and over, there were 89.2 males.

The median income for a household in the town was $32,125, and the median income for a family was $35,000. Males had a median income of $23,500 versus $18,438 for females. The per capita income for the town was $14,052. About 1.1% of families and 7.2% of the population were below the poverty line, including 3.3% of those under the age of eighteen and 21.1% of those 65 or over.
