= Powell, Alabama =

- Town
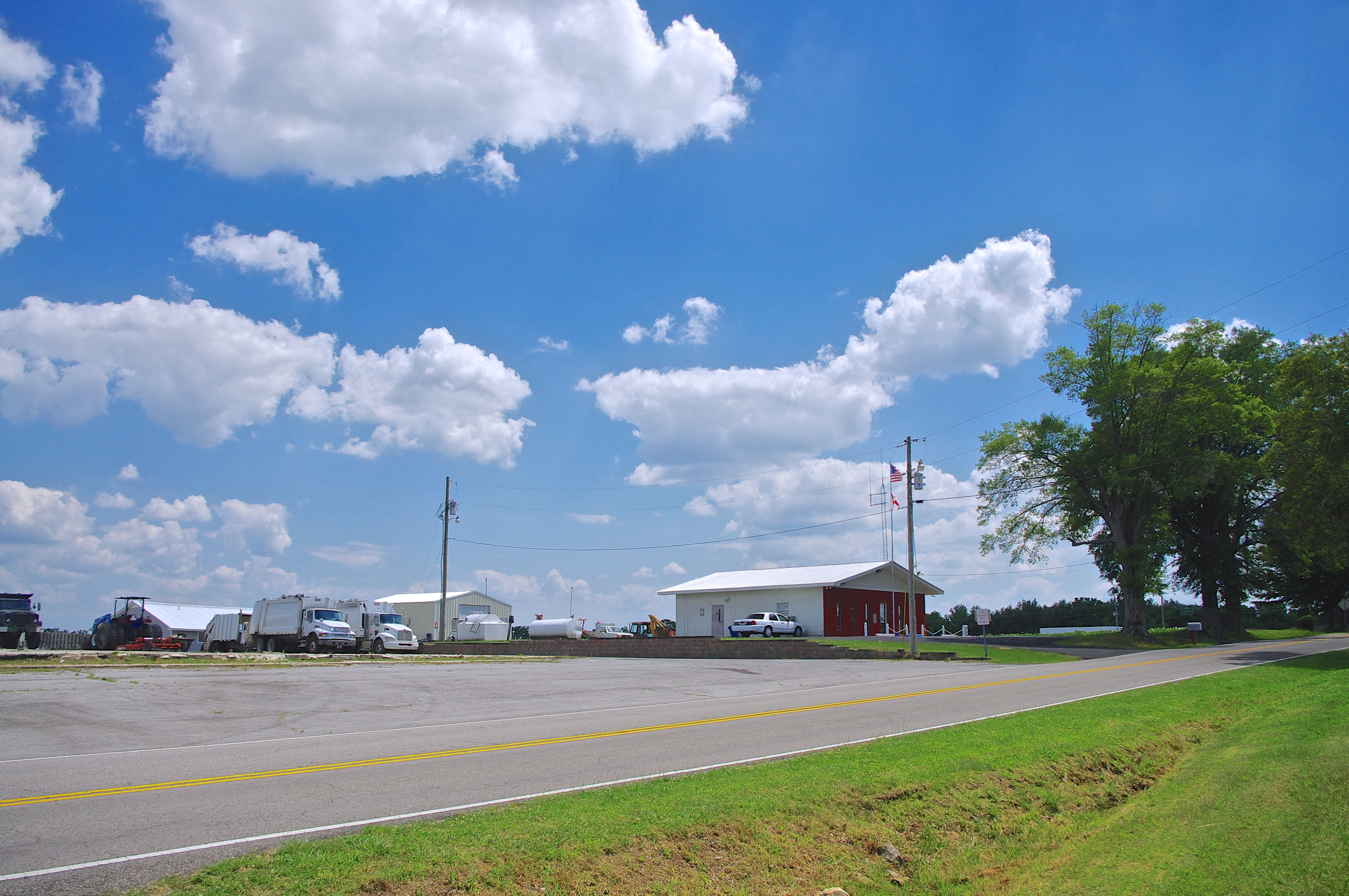
- Town Hall (right) and other buildings in Powell

- Location of Powell in DeKalb County, Alabama.
- Coordinates: 34°32′1″N 85°53′41″W
- Country: United States
- State: Alabama
- County: DeKalb

Area
  - Total: 4.80 sq mi (12.44 km^{2})
  - Land: 4.80 sq mi (12.44 km^{2})
  - Water: 0 sq mi (0.00 km^{2})
- Elevation: 1,227 ft (374 m)

Population (2020)
  - Total: 901
  - Density: 187.6/sq mi (72.44/km^{2})
- Time zone: UTC-6 (Central (CST))
  - Summer (DST): UTC-5 (CDT)
- FIPS code: 01-62075
- GNIS feature ID: 2407153

Powell is a town in DeKalb County, Alabama, United States. At the 2020 census, the population was 901. Powell is located atop Sand Mountain.

Originally incorporated as Powell's Crossroads in the 1960s, it had shortened its name to Powell by the 1990 U.S. Census.

Northeast Alabama Community College is located on the northwest border of the town.

== Geography ==
Powell is located at 34°32′1″N 85°53′41″W (34.533483, -85.894598). The town extends to the Jackson County line to the northwest, and borders the city of Rainsville to the southeast. The town of Section lies across the county line to the northwest.

Alabama State Route 35 passes through Powell, leading northwest 15 miles (24 km) to Scottsboro and southeast through Rainsville 13 miles (21 km) to Fort Payne, the DeKalb County seat.

According to the U.S. Census Bureau, Powell has a total area of 5.0 square miles (12.9 km^{2}), all land.

== Demographics ==
Historical population
Census	Pop.	Note	%±
1970	474		—
1980	636		34.2%
1990	762		19.8%
2000	926		21.5%
2010	955		3.1%
2020	901		−5.7%
U.S. Decennial Census; 2013 Estimate

As of the census of 2000, there were 926 people, 318 households, and 220 families residing in the town. The population density was 187.3 inhabitants per square mile (72.3/km^{2}). There were 338 housing units at an average density of 68.3 per square mile (26.4/km^{2}). The racial makeup of the town was 93.63% White, 4.10% Black or African American, 0.54% Native American, 0.11% Asian, 0.11% Pacific Islander, 0.65% from other races, and 0.86% from two or more races. 2.70% of the population were Hispanic or Latino of any race.

There were 318 households, out of which 32.1% had children under the age of 18 living with them, 52.5% were married couples living together, 14.2% had a female householder with no husband present, and 30.8% were non-families. 27.0% of all households were made up of individuals, and 10.1% had someone living alone who was 65 years of age or older. The average household size was 2.35 and the average family size was 2.85.

In the town, the population was spread out, with 17.9% under the age of 18, 10.8% from 18 to 24, 33.5% from 25 to 44, 25.8% from 45 to 64, and 12.0% who were 65 years of age or older. The median age was 39 years. For every 100 females, there were 84.8 males. For every 100 females age 18 and over, there were 82.7 males.

The median income for a household in the town was $22,857, and the median income for a family was $25,000. Males had a median income of $22,308 versus $17,250 for females. The per capita income for the town was $17,399. About 19.6% of families and 31.1% of the population were below the poverty line, including 28.5% of those under age 18 and 18.3% of those age 65 or over.
