= Dawson, Alabama =

Unincorporated community in Alabama, United States

- Unincorporated community
- Location within Alabama
- Coordinates: 34°18′14″N 085°55′34″W
- Country: United States
- State: Alabama
- County: DeKalb
- Elevation: 1,161 ft (354 m)
- ZIP code: 35963
- Area codes: 256 and 938
- GNIS ID: 155048

Dawson is a small unincorporated community located in DeKalb County, Alabama, United States. It is located atop Sand Mountain, approximately 4 miles (6 km) northeast of the town of Crossville.

== Geography ==
Dawson is located at 34°18′14″N 085°55′34″W. Its average elevation is 1,161 feet (354 m) above sea level.

== History ==
The post office in Dawson was established in 1887.
