= Asbury, Alabama =

Unincorporated community in Alabama, United States

- Unincorporated community
- Location within Alabama Location within the United States
- Coordinates: 34°22′41″N 86°07′34″W
- Country: United States
- State: Alabama
- County: Marshall
- Elevation: 1,106 ft (337 m)
- Time zone: UTC-6 (Central (CST))
  - Summer (DST): UTC-5 (CDT)
- ZIP code: 35951
- Area code: 256
- GNIS feature ID: 1729820

Asbury is an unincorporated community located on Sand Mountain in eastern Marshall County, Alabama, United States. It is located about nine miles east of the county seat of Guntersville. The community was named after a Methodist church, which was named for one of the first Methodist Episcopal Church bishops, Francis Asbury.

== Demographics ==
According to the returns from 1850-2010 for Alabama, it has never reported a population figure separately on the U.S. Census.
