= Bass, Alabama =

Unincorporated community in Alabama, United States

- Unincorporated community
- Location within Alabama Location within the United States
- Coordinates: 34°55′55″N 85°54′47″W
- Country: United States
- State: Alabama
- County: Jackson
- Elevation: 620 ft (189 m)
- Time zone: UTC-6 (Central (CST))
  - Summer (DST): UTC-5 (CDT)
- ZIP code: 35772
- Area codes: 256/938
- GNIS feature ID: 156032

Bass is an unincorporated community in northern Jackson County, Alabama, United States, located approximately six miles northwest of Stevenson.

== History ==
Bass, originally known as Bass Station, was the site of a station along the Nashville, Chattanooga and St. Louis Railway (NC&StL), built in 1853. The name Bass was chosen by Vernon King Stevenson, president of NC&StL, in honor of his wife, whose maiden name was Maria Louisa Bass. A post office was established in 1873, but it was later closed. Louisville and Nashville Railroad gained control of NC&StL in 1880 but continued to operate it independently before finally merging in 1957.
