= Flat Rock, Alabama =

Unincorporated community in Alabama, United States

- Unincorporated community
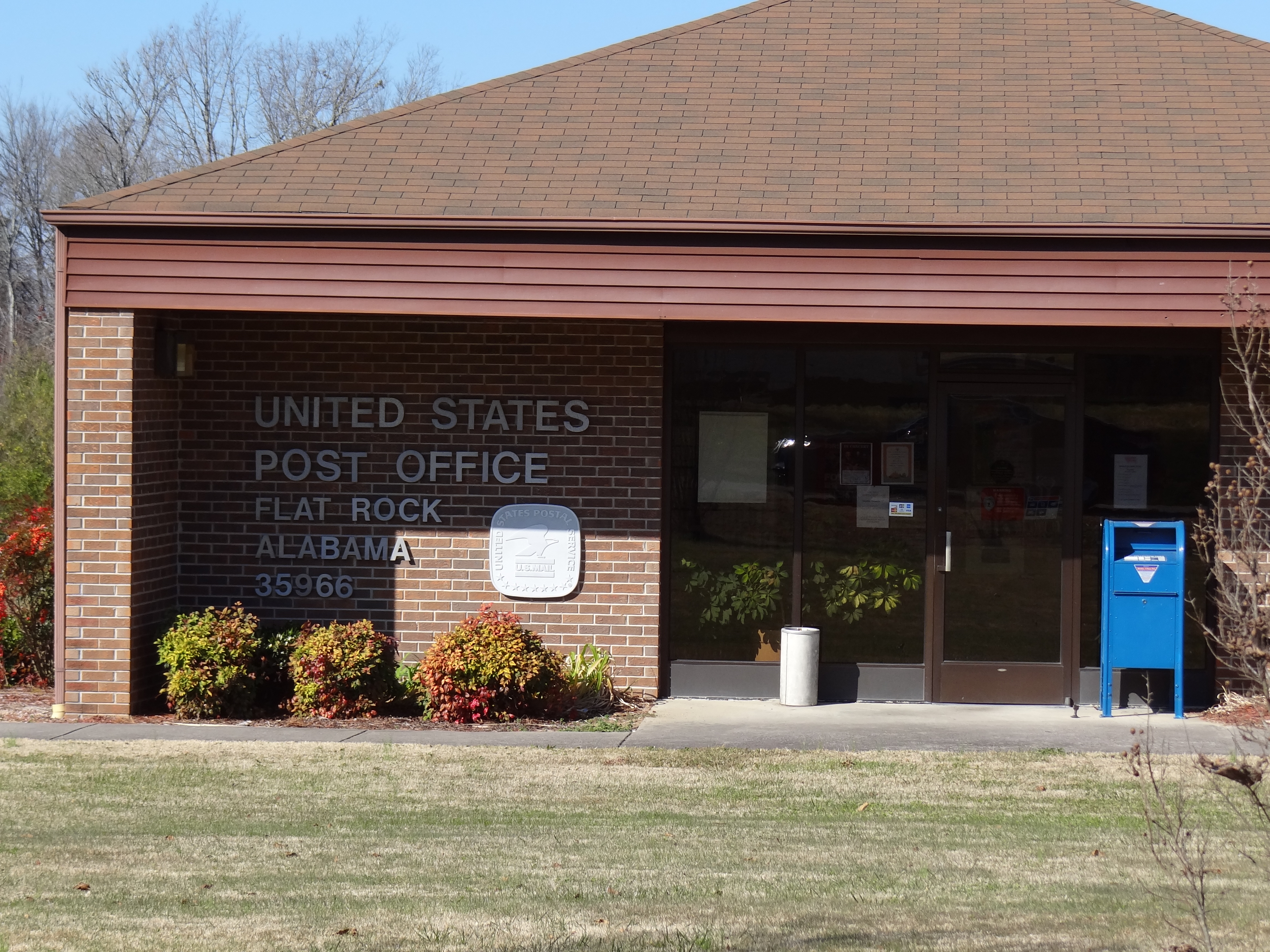
- Post office in Flat Rock

- Location within Alabama Location within the United States
- Coordinates: 34°46′11″N 85°41′40″W
- Country: United States
- State: Alabama
- County: Jackson

Area
  - Land: 33.312 sq mi (86.278 km^{2})
  - Water: 0.0027 sq mi (0.007 km^{2})
- Elevation: 1,365 ft (416 m)

Population (2010)
  - Total: 3,914
  - Density: 117.5/sq mi (45.4/km^{2})
- Time zone: UTC-6 (Central (CST))
  - Summer (DST): UTC-5 (CDT)
- ZIP code: 35966
- Area code: 256
- GNIS feature ID: 118390

Flat Rock is an unincorporated community in Jackson County, Alabama, United States. The Flat Rock post office was established in 1912.

== Geography ==
Flat Rock is located on top of Sand Mountain.

Flat Rock covers a land area of 86.278 square miles (223.46 km^{2}) and a water area of 0.007 square miles (0.018 km^{2}).

=== Major highways ===
- State Route 71
- State Route 117

== Demographics ==
As of the census of 2010, there were 3,914 people. The population density was 117.5 persons per square mile. The racial makeup of the town was 94.9% White, and 3.3% from two or more races. 1.2% of the population were Hispanic or Latino of any race.

In Flat Rock the population was spread out, with 23.6% under the age of 18 and 14.7% who were 65 years of age or older. Marriage status: 18.9% never married, 61.4% now married, 8.1% widowed, and 11.6% divorced.

The per capita income for Flat Rock was $16,748. About 13.2% of the population were below the poverty line.

== Education ==
Flat Rock is home to Flat Rock Elementary School (grades K - 6), which is part of the Jackson County School System.
