= Pisgah, Alabama =

- Town
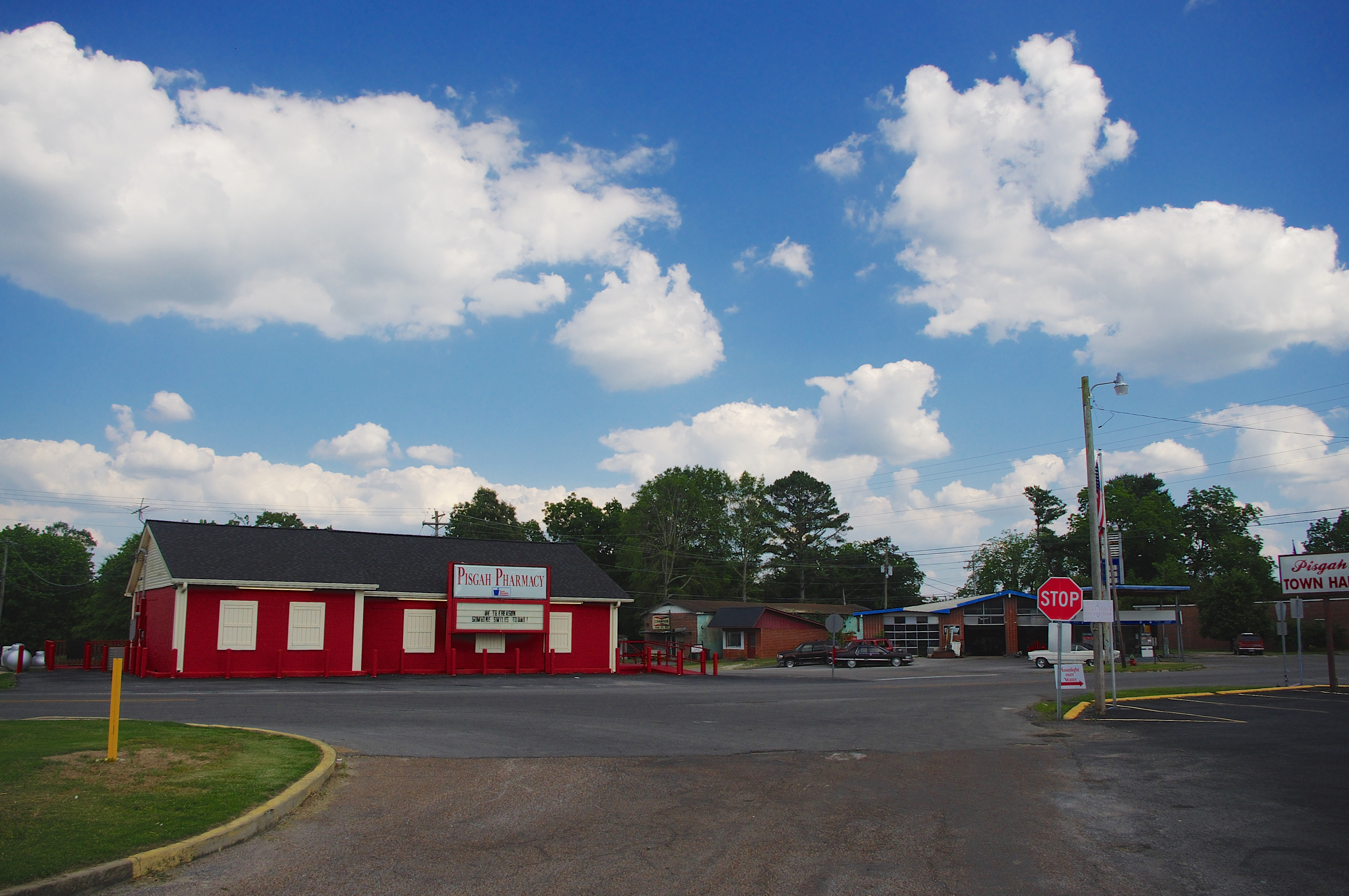
- Businesses in Pisgah

- Location of Pisgah in Jackson County, Alabama.
- Coordinates: 34°41′6″N 85°50′48″W
- Country: United States
- State: Alabama
- County: Jackson

Area
  - Total: 4.80 sq mi (12.43 km^{2})
  - Land: 4.80 sq mi (12.43 km^{2})
  - Water: 0 sq mi (0.00 km^{2})
- Elevation: 1,375 ft (419 m)

Population (2020)
  - Total: 681
  - Density: 141.9/sq mi (54.77/km^{2})
- Time zone: UTC-6 (Central (CST))
  - Summer (DST): UTC-5 (CDT)
- ZIP code: 35765
- Area code: 256
- FIPS code: 01-60720
- GNIS feature ID: 0124912
- Website: townofpisgah.com

Pisgah is a town in Jackson County, Alabama, United States, and is included in the Huntsville-Decatur Combined Statistical Area. It incorporated in 1947. As of the 2020 census, the population of the town was 681, down from 722 in 2010. Pisgah is located atop Sand Mountain.

== History ==
Pisgah was first settled in the late 1830s. A post office was established in 1878. On April 27, 2011, a devastating EF4 tornado moved north of town, killing multiple people.

== Geography ==
Pisgah is located at 34°41′6″N 85°50′48″W (34.685022, -85.846575). The town is situated just off State Route 71, northeast of Section and northwest of Henagar. It lies along the western edge of Sand Mountain, with the Tennessee River (Guntersville Lake) below.

According to the U.S. Census Bureau, the town has a total area of 4.8 square miles (12 km^{2}), all land.

== Demographics ==
Historical population
Census	Pop.	Note	%±
1950	217		—
1960	214		−1.4%
1970	519		142.5%
1980	699		34.7%
1990	652		−6.7%
2000	706		8.3%
2010	722		2.3%
2020	681		−5.7%
U.S. Decennial Census; 2013 Estimate

As of the census of 2000, there were 706 people, 294 households, and 206 families residing in the town. The population density was 147.1 inhabitants per square mile (56.8/km^{2}). There were 323 housing units at an average density of 67.3 per square mile (26.0/km^{2}). The racial makeup of the town was 94.33% White, 0.14% Black or African American, 3.40% Native American, and 2.12% from two or more races. 0.28% of the population were Hispanic or Latino of any race.

There were 294 households, out of which 32.0% had children under the age of 18 living with them, 54.8% were married couples living together, 12.2% had a female householder with no husband present, and 29.6% were non-families. 28.9% of all households were made up of individuals, and 15.0% had someone living alone who was 65 years of age or older. The average household size was 2.40 and the average family size was 2.95.

In the town, the population was spread out, with 25.4% under the age of 18, 9.3% from 18 to 24, 28.9% from 25 to 44, 20.4% from 45 to 64, and 16.0% who were 65 years of age or older. The median age was 36 years. For every 100 females, there were 87.3 males. For every 100 females age 18 and over, there were 82.4 males.

The median income for a household in the town was $28,750, and the median income for a family was $36,250. Males had a median income of $26,146 versus $17,917 for females. The per capita income for the town was $14,503. About 9.5% of families and 10.4% of the population were below the poverty line, including 14.2% of those under age 18 and 15.0% of those age 65 or over.

== Pisgah High School ==
Pisgah High School is a kindergarten through twelfth grade school and is part of the Jackson County school system. Enrollment is around 570 students.
