= Salvation on Sand Mountain =

1995 nonfiction book by Dennis Covington

- Cover of the first edition
- Author: Dennis Covington
- Cover artist: Jim Neel
- Language: English
- Subject: Snake handling
- Publisher: Addison-Wesley
- Publication date: 1995
- Publication place: United States
- Media type: Print (hardcover · paperback)
- Pages: 272
- ISBN: 978-0-14-025458-7

Salvation on Sand Mountain is a 1995 nonfiction book by Dennis Covington. The storyline follows the author as he goes from covering the trial of Glenn Summerford in Scottsboro, Alabama to experiencing a snake handling church in Appalachia. The book was a finalist for the National Book Award.

== Writing style ==
The book, which is written in the first person, begins in a neutral, journalistic style and becomes more emotional as the author is drawn to the people and practices of the church. It can be described as a memoir of the author's experiences with the snake-handling Church of Jesus with Signs Following and his temporary participation in their church.

Covington submerged himself into this congregation, and began to care tremendously for their beliefs. That then forms into caring for Summerford, himself.

== Reception ==
Salvation on Sand Mountain was a non-fiction finalist for the National Book Award. Publishers Weekly described the text as "a captivating glimpse of an exotic religious sect." Booklist described it as a "fascinating work [that] catches the essence of a place, southern Appalachia, its people, and the author's personal journey into his past."
