= Rosalie, Alabama =

Unincorporated community in Alabama, United States

- Unincorporated community
- Location within Alabama Location within the United States
- Coordinates: 34.69980°N 85.76858°W
- Country: United States
- State: Alabama
- County: Jackson
- Elevation: 1,483 ft (452 m)
- Time zone: UTC-6 (Central (CST))
  - Summer (DST): UTC-5 (CDT)

Rosalie is an unincorporated community in Jackson County, Alabama, United States. On November 30, 2016, a devastating EF3 tornado struck the area.

== Geography ==
Rosalie is located at 34.69980°N 85.76858°W and has an elevation of 1,483 feet (452 m).
