= Henagar, Alabama =

City in Alabama, United States

Henagar
- City
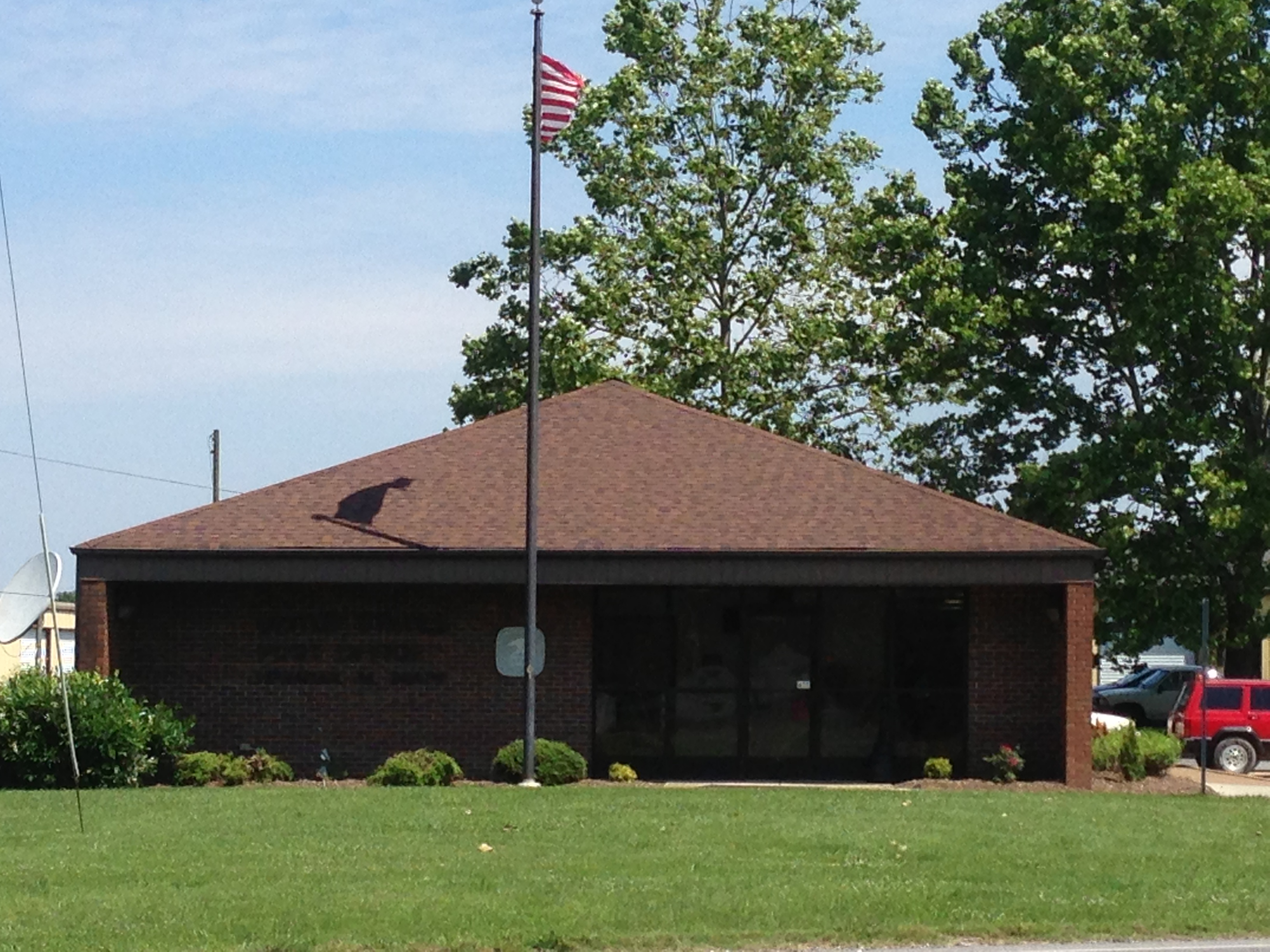
- Post office in Henagar

- Seal
- Motto(s): "Building a Future, Preserving the Past"
- Location of Henagar in DeKalb County, Alabama.
- Coordinates: 34°38′1″N 85°44′35″W
- Country: United States
- State: Alabama
- County: DeKalb

Area
  - Total: 22.64 sq mi (58.64 km^{2})
  - Land: 22.61 sq mi (58.56 km^{2})
  - Water: 0.035 sq mi (0.09 km^{2})
- Elevation: 1,486 ft (453 m)

Population (2020)
  - Total: 2,292
  - Density: 101.4/sq mi (39.14/km^{2})
- Time zone: UTC-6 (Central (CST))
  - Summer (DST): UTC-5 (CDT)
- ZIP code: 35978
- Area code: 256
- FIPS code: 01-34096
- GNIS feature ID: 2404680
- Website: www.cityofhenagar.com

Henagar is a city in DeKalb County, Alabama, United States. At the 2020 census, the population was 2,292.

Henagar is located on top of Sand Mountain, a southern extension of the Cumberland Plateau.

== History ==
Henagar was first settled circa 1855. The town is named after an early settler, George Henegar. A post office was established in 1878. It was then that a postal official misspelled the town's name as "Henagar". In 1901, a public school was built. At daybreak on November 18, 1906, a Sunday, the Rainsville tornado struck the town, and all "fifteen stores and houses were reduced to splinters." They rebuilt, and Henagar incorporated in 1965.

== Geography ==
Henagar is located in northern DeKalb County; it borders Jackson County in the northwest.

Highways include Alabama State Route 40 and Alabama State Route 75.

According to the U.S. Census Bureau, Henagar has a total area of 22.3 square miles (57.8 km^{2}), of which 22.3 square miles (57.7 km^{2}) is land and 0.04 square miles (0.1 km^{2}), or 0.15%, is water. South Sauty Creek, a tributary of the Tennessee River, flows southwest through the central and southern part of the city.

== Demographics ==
Historical population
| Census | Pop. | Note | %± |
|---|---|---|---|
| 1970 | 812 | | — |
| 1980 | 1,188 | | 46.3% |
| 1990 | 1,934 | | 62.8% |
| 2000 | 2,400 | | 24.1% |
| 2010 | 2,344 | | −2.3% |
| 2020 | 2,292 | | −2.2% |
U.S. Decennial Census; 2013 Estimate

=== Racial and ethnic composition ===
Henagar city, Alabama – Racial and ethnic composition Note: the US Census treats Hispanic/Latino as an ethnic category. This table excludes Latinos from the racial categories and assigns them to a separate category. Hispanics/Latinos may be of any race. Hispanics/Latinos may be of any race. Race and ethnicity were not reported in Alabama for populations under 2,500 in 1980 and under 1,000 in 1990.
| Race / Ethnicity (NH = Non-Hispanic) | Pop 1990 | Pop 2000 | Pop 2010 | Pop 2020 | % 1990 | % 2000 | % 2010 | % 2020 |
|---|---|---|---|---|---|---|---|---|
| White alone (NH) | 1,904 | 2,303 | 2,229 | 2,042 | 98.45% | 95.96% | 95.09% | 89.09% |
| Black or African American alone (NH) | 0 | 0 | 1 | 6 | 0.00% | 0.00% | 0.04% | 0.26% |
| Native American or Alaska Native alone (NH) | 17 | 40 | 42 | 40 | 0.88% | 1.67% | 1.79% | 1.75% |
| Asian alone (NH) | 2 | 1 | 1 | 6 | 0.10% | 0.04% | 0.04% | 0.26% |
| Native Hawaiian or Pacific Islander alone (NH) | x | 1 | 1 | 0 | x | 0.04% | 0.04% | 0.00% |
| Other race alone (NH) | 0 | 0 | 0 | 11 | 0.00% | 0.00% | 0.00% | 0.48% |
| Mixed race or Multiracial (NH) | x | 38 | 37 | 119 | x | 1.58% | 1.58% | 5.19% |
| Hispanic or Latino (any race) | 11 | 17 | 33 | 68 | 0.57% | 0.71% | 1.41% | 2.97% |
| Total | 1,934 | 2,400 | 2,344 | 2,292 | 100.00% | 100.00% | 100.00% | 100.00% |

=== 2020 census ===
As of the 2020 census, Henagar had a population of 2,292, with 933 households and 608 families. The median age was 44.5 years. 21.6% of residents were under the age of 18 and 20.8% of residents were 65 years of age or older. For every 100 females there were 97.4 males, and for every 100 females age 18 and over there were 91.7 males age 18 and over.

Of all households, 28.5% had children under the age of 18 living in them. 50.3% were married-couple households, 18.4% were households with a male householder and no spouse or partner present, and 26.2% were households with a female householder and no spouse or partner present. About 26.0% of all households were made up of individuals and 12.6% had someone living alone who was 65 years of age or older.

There were 1,087 housing units, of which 14.2% were vacant. The homeowner vacancy rate was 1.4% and the rental vacancy rate was 8.6%.

0.0% of residents lived in urban areas, while 100.0% lived in rural areas.

=== 2010 census ===
At the 2010 census, there were 2,344 people, 942 households, and 676 families living in the town. The population density was 107.0 inhabitants per square mile (41.3/km^{2}). There were 1,092 housing units at an average density of 49.9 per square mile (19.3/km^{2}). The racial makeup of the town was 96.2% White, 1.8% Native American, 0.0% Asian, 0.0% Pacific Islander, 0.3% from other races, and 1.6% from two or more races. 1.4% of the population were Hispanic or Latino of any race. Of the 942 households, 29.6% had children under the age of 18 living with them, 55.9% were married couples living together, 9.8% had a female householder with no husband present, and 28.2% were non-families. 25.2% of households were one person and 10.6% were one person aged 65 or older. The average household size was 2.49 and the average family size was 2.93.

The age distribution was 23.9% under the age of 18, 6.8% from 18 to 24, 24.5% from 25 to 44, 29.7% from 45 to 64, and 15.1% 65 or older. The median age was 41 years. For every 100 females, there were 100.5 males. For every 100 females age 18 and over, there were 103.4 males.

The median household income was $32,130 and the median family income was $39,432. Males had a median income of $40,227 versus $24,122 for females. The per capita income for the town was $21,701. About 17.9% of families and 19.8% of the population were below the poverty line, including 32.5% of those under age 18 and 13.6% of those age 65 or over.

=== 2000 census ===
At the 2000 census there were 2,400 people, 937 households, and 715 families living in the town. The population density was 109.8 inhabitants per square mile (42.4/km^{2}). There were 1,056 housing units at an average density of 48.3 per square mile (18.6/km^{2}). The racial makeup of the town was 96.46% White, 1.67% Native American, 0.04% Asian, 0.04% Pacific Islander, 0.21% from other races, and 1.58% from two or more races. 0.71% of the population were Hispanic or Latino of any race.

Of the 937 households 34.9% had children under the age of 18 living with them, 64.8% were married couples living together, 8.2% had a female householder with no husband present, and 23.6% were non-families. 21.7% of households were one person and 10.0% were one person aged 65 or older. The average household size was 2.56 and the average family size was 2.96.

The age distribution was 24.8% under the age of 18, 9.3% from 18 to 24, 28.2% from 25 to 44, 25.0% from 45 to 64, and 12.8% 65 or older. The median age was 37 years. For every 100 females, there were 93.9 males. For every 100 females age 18 and over, there were 92.1 males.

The median household income was $29,777 and the median family income was $34,469. Males had a median income of $29,309 versus $19,401 for females. The per capita income for the town was $14,836. About 10.3% of families and 16.9% of the population were below the poverty line, including 23.0% of those under age 18 and 25.5% of those age 65 or over.

== Arts and culture ==
The Sand Mountain Potato Festival is celebrated each July in Henagar, with potatoes, live music, entertainment, arts and crafts, games, and fireworks since 1983.

A drive-in theater is located in Henagar.

== Education ==
Public education is administered by DeKalb County Schools. Henagar Junior High School is located in Henagar.

== Notable people ==
- Charlie Louvin, country music singer
