= Section, Alabama =

- Town
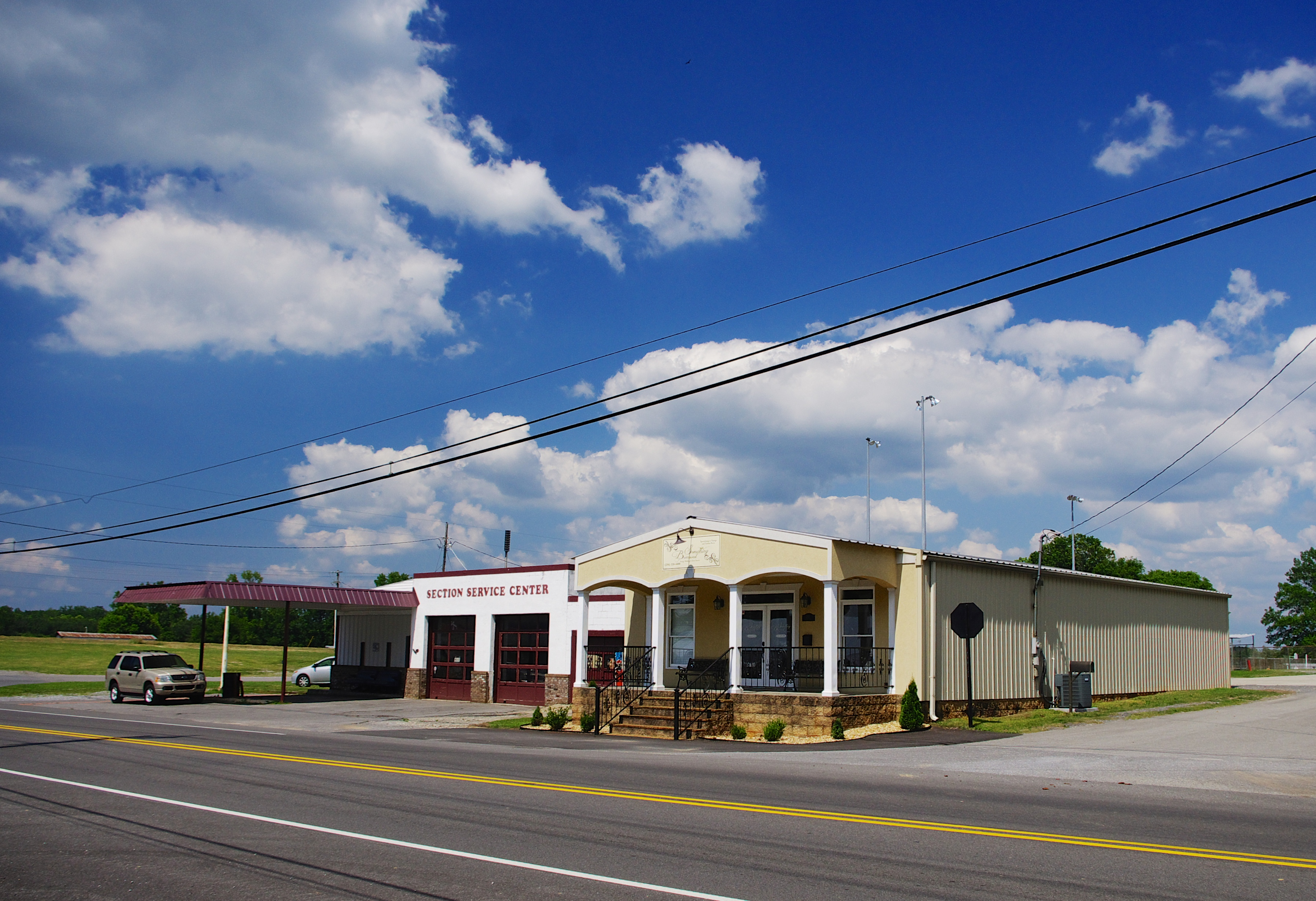
- Businesses along Main Street in Section

- Location of Section in Jackson County, Alabama.
- Coordinates: 34°34′41″N 85°59′17″W
- Country: United States
- State: Alabama
- County: Jackson

Government
  - Mayor: Rick Hanback

Area
  - Total: 4.57 sq mi (11.84 km^{2})
  - Land: 4.57 sq mi (11.84 km^{2})
  - Water: 0 sq mi (0.00 km^{2})
- Elevation: 1,348 ft (411 m)

Population (2020)
  - Total: 756
  - Density: 165.3/sq mi (63.84/km^{2})
- Time zone: UTC-6 (Central (CST))
  - Summer (DST): UTC-5 (CDT)
- ZIP code: 35771
- Area code: 256
- FIPS code: 01-69000
- GNIS feature ID: 0153363

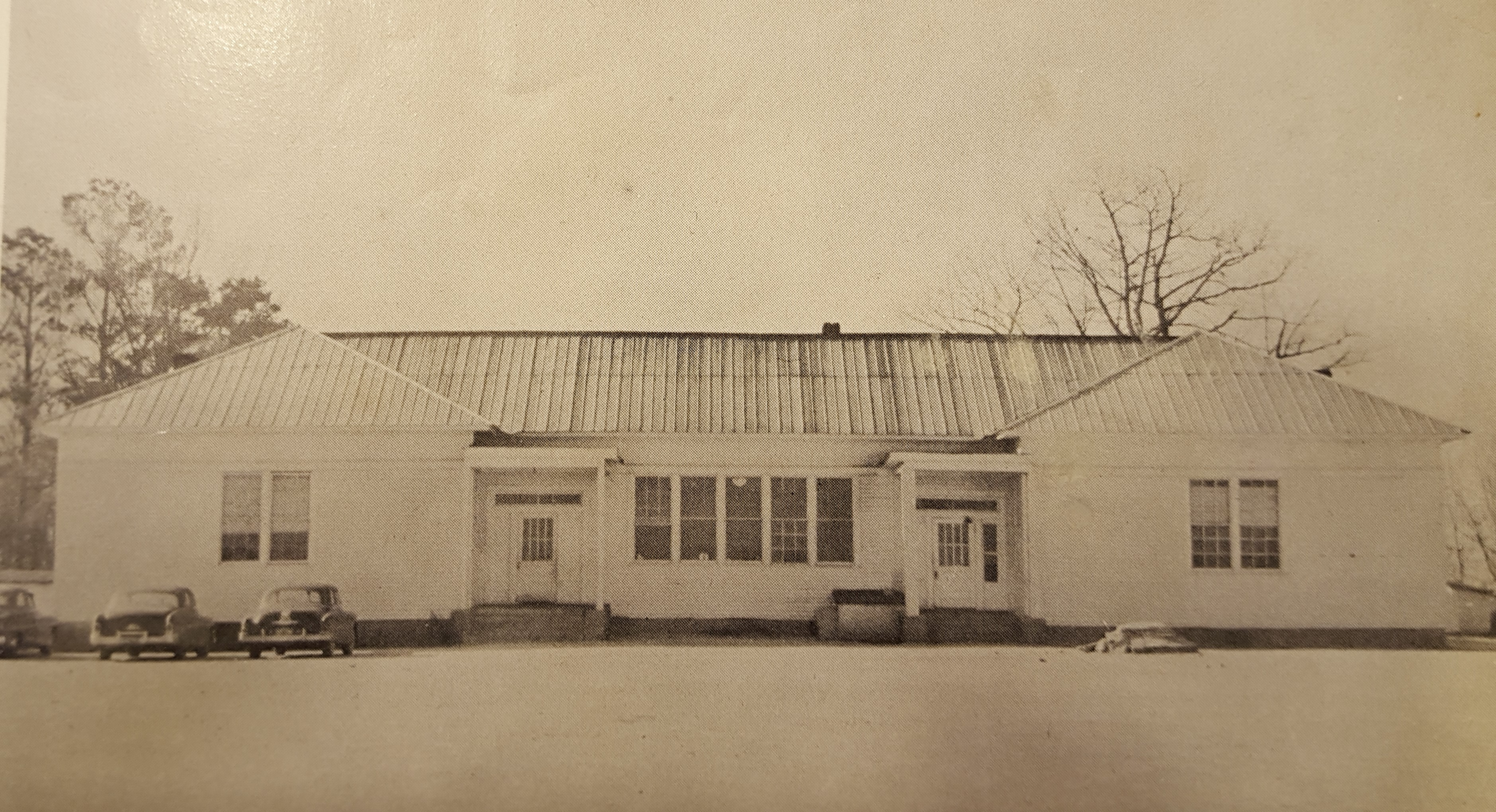
Section Junior High School, 1952. Roy L. Buford, Principal

Section is a town in Jackson County, Alabama, United States and is included in the Chattanooga-Cleveland-Dalton, TN-GA-AL Combined Statistical Area. As of the 2020 census, Section had a population of 756. Section is located on top of Sand Mountain.

== History ==
Section is located on land where the Cherokee once hunted and lived. The community was originally known as Mt. Zion when the first post office was established. There were communities such as Kirby's Creek, Gossets Hollow, and Fern Cliff. These communities came together to form the Town of Section. Pioneer settlers came in 1862 to Section, in large numbers. Settlers were required to live on the land for five years before claiming the property as their own. It became known later as "Section" because it was the location of a square-mile parcel of land, known as the 16th Section, required by the federal government to be set aside in support of public schools. Bort Harrison ran a 6-horsepower, water-powered flour and grist mill in 1886, and the first store in the community was built in 1889. The first school was built in the area before 1890, which was the year it burned. Its successor lasted 25 years before it also burned. Section was cited as having incorporated in 1910, however, on the 1950 U.S. Census rolls, it stated Section incorporated in 1946.

== Geography ==
Section is located at 34°34′41″N 85°59′17″W (34.578155, -85.988114). The town is situated along State Route 35, northwest of Rainsville and southeast of Scottsboro. It lies along the western edge of Sand Mountain, and several points in the town, including Weathington Park, offer dramatic views of the Tennessee River and valley to the west. State Route 71 intersects State Route 35 in Section, connecting the area with Dutton and the Pisgah area to the northeast.

According to the U.S. Census Bureau, the town has a total area of 4.6 square miles (12 km^{2}), all land.

== Demographics ==
Historical population
Census	Pop.	Note	%±
1950	476		—
1960	595		25.0%
1970	702		18.0%
1980	821		17.0%
1990	777		−5.4%
2000	769		−1.0%
2010	770		0.1%
2020	756		−1.8%
U.S. Decennial Census; 2013 Estimate

As of the census of 2000, there were 769 people, 321 households, and 228 families residing in the township. The population density was 167.9 inhabitants per square mile (64.8/km^{2}). There were 352 housing units at an average density of 76.8 per square mile (29.7/km^{2}). The racial makeup of the township was 93.89% White, 0.78% Black or African American, 2.34% Native American, 0.13% from other races, and 2.86% from two or more races. 0.52% of the population were Hispanic or Latino of any race.

There were 321 households, out of which 27.7% had children under the age of 18 living with them, 56.1% were married couples living together, 12.1% had a female householder with no husband present, and 28.7% were non-families. 25.9% of all households were made up of individuals, and 14.0% had someone living alone who was 65 years of age or older. The average household size was 2.40 and the average family size was 2.88.

In the town, the population was spread out, with 21.2% under the age of 18, 8.5% from 18 to 24, 24.3% from 25 to 44, 30.9% from 45 to 64, and 15.1% who were 65 years of age or older. The median age was 42 years. For every 100 females, there were 84.9 males. For every 100 females age 18 and over, there were 82.5 males.

The median income for a household in the town was $31,500, and the median income for a family was $37,115. Males had a median income of $29,205 versus $20,781 for females. The per capita income for the township was $17,036. About 15.0% of families and 16.3% of the population were below the poverty line, including 25.5% of those under age 18 and 12.4% of those age 65 or over.

== Section High School ==
Section High School is a kindergarten through twelfth grade school and is part of the Jackson County school system. Section became a high school in 1955. The first principal was Roy L. Buford.
