= Higdon, Alabama =

Unincorporated community in Alabama, United States

- Unincorporated community
- Location within Alabama Location within the United States
- Coordinates: 34°50′44″N 85°36′59″W
- Country: United States
- State: Alabama
- County: Jackson DeKalb

Area
  - Land: 3.940 sq mi (10.205 km^{2})
  - Water: 0 sq mi (0 km^{2})
- Elevation: 1,381 ft (421 m)

Population (2010)
  - Total: 1,398
  - Density: 354.8/sq mi (137.0/km^{2})
- Time zone: UTC-6 (Central (CST))
  - Summer (DST): UTC-5 (CDT)
- ZIP code: 35979
- Area code: 256
- GNIS feature ID: 120045

Higdon is an unincorporated community in Jackson County, and Dekalb County, Alabama, United States.

== History ==
A post office called Higdon has been in operation since 1882. The community bears the name of its first postmaster.

== Geography ==
Higdon is located on top of Sand Mountain.

Higdon covers an area of 10.205 square miles (26.43 km^{2}), all land.

=== Major highways ===
- State Route 71
- State Route 75

== Demographics ==
As of the census of 2010, there were 1,398 people. The population density was 354.8 persons per square mile. The racial makeup of the town was 95.5% White, 0.2% Black and 2.1% from two or more races. 0.9% of the population were Hispanic or Latino of any race.

In Higdon, the population was spread out, with 26.1% under the age of 18 and 13.2% who were 64 years of age or older. Marriage status: 15.1% never married, 71.9% now married, 3.8% widowed, and 9.2% divorced.

The per capita income for Higdon was $14,341. About 7.1% of the population were below the poverty line.

== Education ==
Higdon is home to North Sand Mountain School, which is part of the Jackson County School System.
