= Sand Mountain (Alabama) =

Mountain in Alabama, United States

Coordinates: 34°27′N 86°00′W

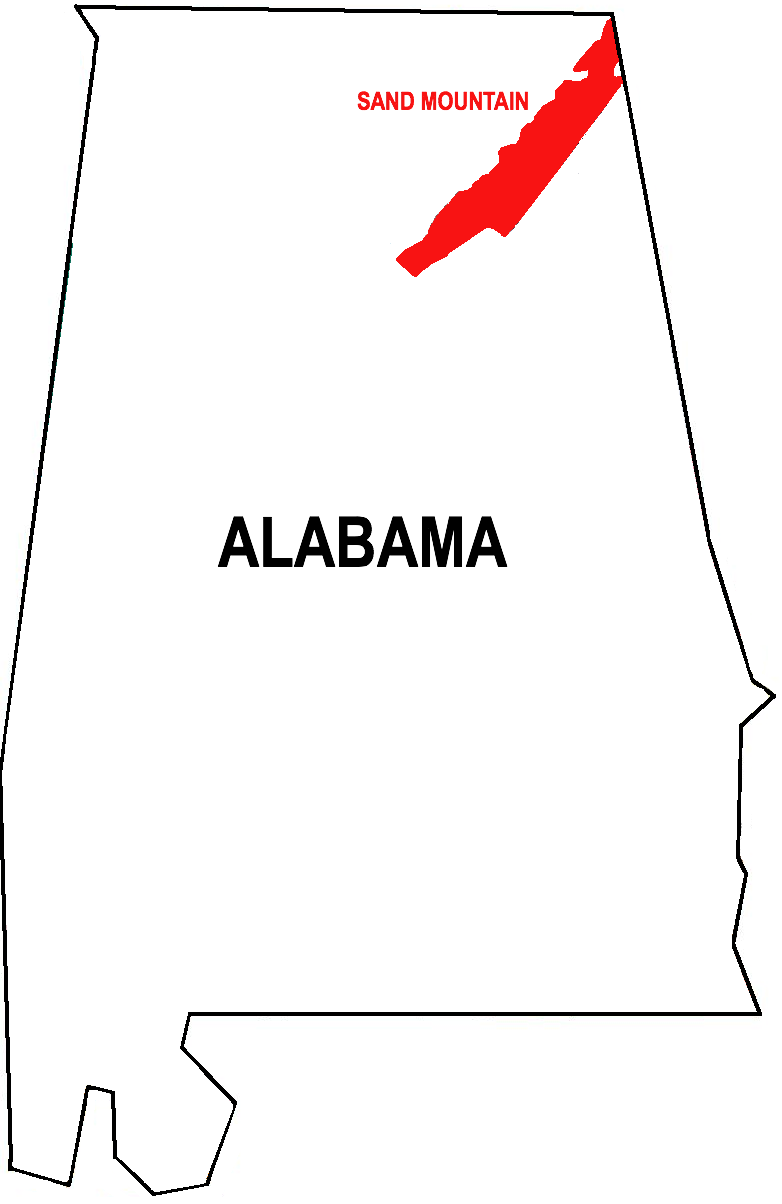
- Sand Mountain in Alabama

Geography
- Location: Alabama, United States
- Parent range: Appalachian Mountains

Geology
- Rock type: Sandstone

Sand Mountain is a sandstone plateau in northeastern Alabama and (to a far lesser extent) northwestern Georgia and southeastern Tennessee where the plateau is known as Raccoon Mountain and Elder Mountain. It is part of the southern tip of the Appalachian mountain chain and it is the largest plateau in the chain. Geologically a continuation of Walden Ridge, Sand Mountain is part of the Cumberland Plateau, separated from the main portion of the plateau by the Tennessee River and Sequatchie Valley. The average elevation on Sand Mountain is around 1,500 feet (460 m) above sea level, compared to about 650 feet (200 m) in the surrounding area. This elevation leads to its having the coolest climate in the state of Alabama. The largest city on Sand Mountain is Albertville, in Marshall County. As of the 2020 census, the population of the city was 22,386.

== History ==
=== Prehistory through the Colonial Period ===
The Sand Mountain area has been inhabited for at least 9,000 years, as evidenced by archaeological finds at nearby Russell Cave National Monument, near Bridgeport, Alabama. In historical times, Cherokee and Creek villages were located in the Tennessee Valley to the west of Sand Mountain, and in Wills Valley to the east. Sequoyah, creator of the Cherokee syllabary, lived in the Cherokee village of Wills Town, near present-day Fort Payne in Wills Valley.

The first Europeans to see it were probably Spanish explorer Hernando de Soto and his men, who are believed to have crossed Sand Mountain during their journey through southeastern North America between 1539 and 1543. One of the likely routes for the expedition traces their path across Sand Mountain on the way south from the Tennessee Valley to the Coosa Valley.

=== Civil War ===
Union troops under Major General George H. Thomas crossed Sand Mountain in September 1863 in an attempt to cut off the Confederate troops in Chattanooga. They were unsuccessful, and the opposing armies met at the Battle of Chickamauga on September 19–20, 1863, resulting in a major Confederate victory.

Jackson and DeKalb counties, along with the other counties of north Alabama, had voted against immediate secession in December 1860, and pro-Union sentiment remained strong on Sand Mountain. In early 1861, citizens in several northeastern counties proposed breaking away from Alabama and joining with neighboring counties of East Tennessee to create a new Union state of Nickajack. Industries such as mining, milling, and working for the railroad were acceptable as exemptions to military service for Southern unionists, and some on Sand Mountain who did not wish to serve in the army worked at Sauta Cave in the Tennessee Valley, mining potassium nitrate to make gunpowder at Selma.

In September 1861, the "Paint Rock Rifles" were raised on Sand Mountain by Confederate Colonel Lemuel Green Mead of Jackson County. They became Company C of the 26th Alabama Infantry Regiment, and served with distinction at the Battle of Shiloh in April 1862. Mead resigned his infantry commission in July 1862, after Union troops had invaded north Alabama, and organized an independent company of partisan rangers who carried out guerrilla raids against occupying Union forces. The company was the core of what eventually became Mead's Alabama and Tennessee Cavalry Battalion.

In the summer of 1862, "Gunter's 1st Partisan Ranger Battalion" was formed on Sand Mountain in Jackson County by Major William T. Gunter. The battalion consisted of five mounted companies and served under Lieutenant General Nathan Bedford Forrest in skirmishes along the Tennessee River. In November 1862, the battalion was merged with the 33rd Alabama Infantry Regiment.

A Union regiment, the 1st Tennessee and Alabama Vidette Cavalry, was formed at Union-occupied Stevenson, Alabama, in 1863, drawing men primarily from Sand Mountain, many of them Confederate deserters. However, the regiment was never all together and the companies were scattered around the area on guard duty. It was eventually disbanded before the end of the war.

=== 20th century ===
Sand Mountain was home, from 1903 to 1905, to a short-lived commune of forty Russian Jewish families attempting to form a collective farm and manufacturing concern. Due to the isolation of the area from other Jewish communities, the limestone soil of the area, and disharmony within the group, the project was abandoned and the inhabitants relocated after two years.

== Geography ==
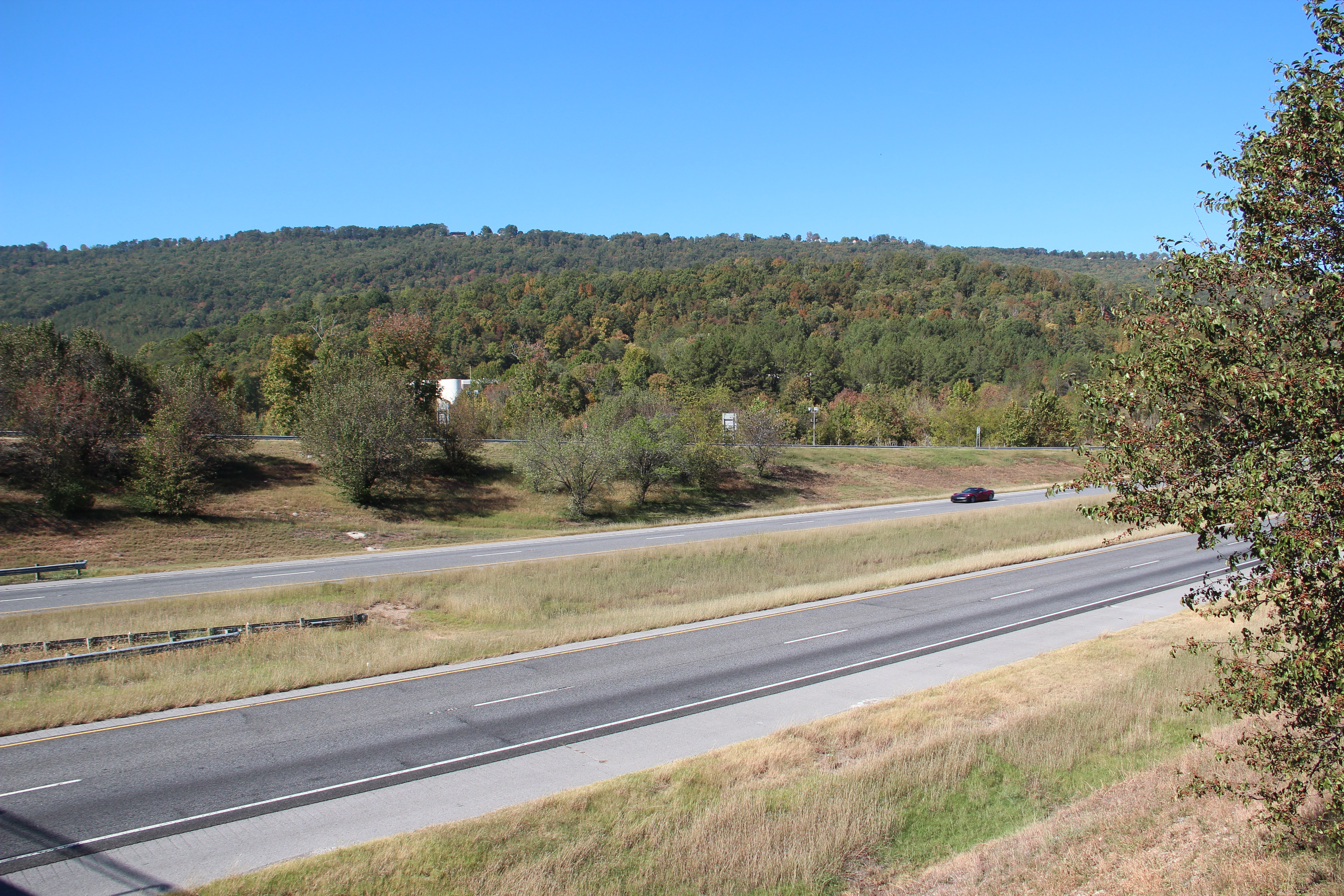
Sand Mountain viewed from Trenton, Georgia

Sand Mountain runs in a diagonal northeast-southwest direction from the northeastern corner of Alabama, and includes parts of Jackson, DeKalb, Marshall, Etowah and Blount counties in Alabama, as well as part of Dade County, Georgia.

Sand Mountain, especially the northern end, i.e. eastern Jackson County and northern DeKalb County, is mostly a rural, agricultural area, with a mix of chicken, cow, and potato farms, as well as other assorted farms, and large expanses of both rolling pastures and forests. It contains many small towns (less than 1,000 people) and unincorporated communities.

== Current issues and social characteristics ==
Politically and religiously, Sand Mountain is a fairly conservative place, consistently voting for conservative candidates in elections, and with Baptists claiming the largest number of congregants of any church denomination. Much of Sand Mountain is dry, with the sale of alcoholic beverages being forbidden.

Sand Mountain is one of the last places in the country with churches which still use Sacred Harp singing in their Sunday morning church services, and is home to many of the largest and oldest continuous Sacred Harp singings in the country, as well as many important singers (i.e. editors of the Sacred Harp tunebook).

Snake handling by some churches on Sand Mountain was the subject of Salvation on Sand Mountain, a 1996 book by Dennis Covington. Those who live on Sand Mountain state that the book mostly took place in Scottsboro, in the Tennessee River valley to the west of Sand Mountain.

== Climate ==
Sand Mountain, being located in the mid-South, has long hot humid summers, and winters which are short and mild by comparison to much of the rest of the country, with snow being a real rarity. Its elevation, however, leads to it being cooler than the rest of the state of Alabama. On Sand Mountain, between 60 and 90 days per year are over 86 °F (30 °C), according to the Heat Zone Map published by the American Horticultural Society. By comparison, the great majority of the upper Midwest and Northeast has less than 30 such days per year. These hot days, combined with the South's high humidity, make it sweltering in the summer. The average daytime temperature is in the high 70s or above for at least five months out of the year (May through September). Sand Mountain has higher rainfall than almost anywhere else in the South, including anywhere else in Alabama, with the exception of the Gulf Coast area. Some areas of Sand Mountain get more than 66 inches (1,700 mm) of rainfall per year (though others get as little as 54 inches (1,400 mm)).

The following is a general idea of Sand Mountain's climate, taken from Ider, Alabama:

Climate data for Sand Mountain, Alabama (spec. Ider, Ala.)
Month	Jan	Feb	Mar	Apr	May	Jun	Jul	Aug	Sep	Oct	Nov	Dec	Year
Mean daily maximum °F (°C)	48 (9)	53 (12)	61 (16)	70 (21)	77 (25)	84 (29)	88 (31)	87 (31)	82 (28)	72 (22)	61 (16)	51 (11)	70 (21)
Mean daily minimum °F (°C)	26 (−3)	28 (−2)	35 (2)	42 (6)	52 (11)	60 (16)	65 (18)	64 (18)	57 (14)	44 (7)	36 (2)	29 (−2)	45 (7)
Average precipitation inches (mm)	6.06 (154)	5.62 (143)	6.57 (167)	4.73 (120)	4.70 (119)	4.33 (110)	5.18 (132)	3.49 (89)	4.27 (108)	3.29 (84)	5.00 (127)	5.12 (130)	58.36 (1,482)
Source: Weather.com

== Soil ==
Sand Mountain has, on average, a 2-to-4-foot (0.6 to 1.2 m) depth of soil - after which is solid sandstone bedrock. The soil is generally loam-based, and is a mixture of sandy loam and silty loam, drawing from such series as Apison, Atkins, Cotaco-Barbourville, Crossville, Hartsells, Lickdale, and Muskingum. It is extremely acidic, growing more so the deeper you go from the top. It is classified as "well-drained".

== Settlements located on Sand Mountain ==
=== Jackson County ===
- Browntown
- Bryant
- Central
- Davistown
- Dutton
- Eliza
- Fabius
- Fair View
- Flat Rock
- Higdon
- Liberty Hill
- Macedonia
- Overlook
- Pisgah
- Rosalie
- Section
- Shrader

=== DeKalb County ===
- Blake
- Brooks Crossroads
- Cartersville
- Council Bluff
- Crossville
- Dawson
- Elliott Crossroads
- Five Forks
- Fort Payne
- Fyffe
- Geraldine
- Grove Oak
- Guest
- Henagar
- High Point
- Horton
- Ider
- Kilpatrick
- Lakeview
- Lathamville
- Liberty
- Old Blevins Mill
- Plainview
- Powell
- Rainsville
- Shiloh
- Skaggs Corner
- Sylvania
- Ten Broeck
- Townson Crossroads
- Whiton

=== Marshall County ===
- Albertville
- Asbury
- Boaz (partially located in Etowah County)
- Douglas
- Guntersville (only partially located on Sand Mountain)

=== Etowah County ===
- Sardis City

=== Blount County ===
- Oneonta (only partially located on Sand Mountain)
- Snead
- Susan Moore

== See also ==
- Lookout Mountain
