= Hammondville, Alabama =

- Town
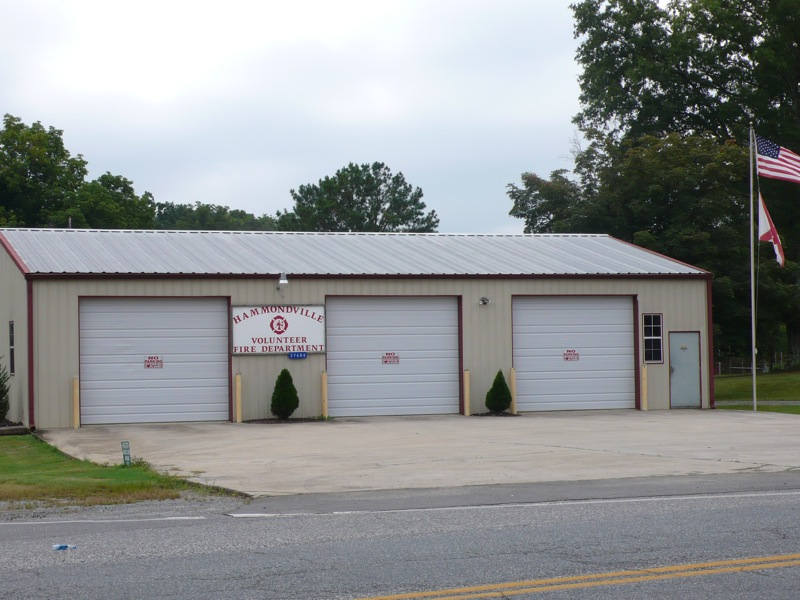
- The Volunteer Fire Department in Hammondville, Alabama

- Flag

- Location of Hammondville in DeKalb County, Alabama.
- Coordinates: 34°34′10″N 85°38′18″W
- Country: United States
- State: Alabama
- County: DeKalb

Area
  - Total: 4.86 sq mi (12.59 km^{2})
  - Land: 4.85 sq mi (12.56 km^{2})
  - Water: 0.012 sq mi (0.03 km^{2})
- Elevation: 1,007 ft (307 m)

Population (2020)
  - Total: 425
  - Density: 87.7/sq mi (33.85/km^{2})
- Time zone: UTC-6 (Central (CST))
  - Summer (DST): UTC-5 (CDT)
- ZIP code: 35989
- Area code: 256
- FIPS code: 01-32896
- GNIS feature ID: 2406640
- Website: hammondville.org

Hammondville is a town in DeKalb County, Alabama, United States. It was incorporated in 1937. As of the 2020 census, Hammondville had a population of 425.

== Geography ==
Hammondville is located at 34°34′10″N 85°38′18″W (34.569414, -85.638305).

According to the U.S. Census Bureau, the town has a total area of 4.9 square miles (13 km^{2}), all land.

== Demographics ==
Historical population
Census	Pop.	Note	%±
1940	93		—
1950	94		1.1%
1960	134		42.6%
1970	221		64.9%
1980	369		67.0%
1990	420		13.8%
2000	486		15.7%
2010	488		0.4%
2020	425		−12.9%
U.S. Decennial Census; 2013 Estimate

As of the 2010 census Hammondville had a population of 488. The racial and ethnic composition of the population was 88.3% non-Hispanic white, 0.8% black or African American, 0.2% Native American, 0.6% Asian, 5.1% from some other race, 3.3% from two or more races and 6.8% Hispanic or Latino or any race.

As of the census of 2000, there were 486 people, 193 households, and 150 families residing in the town. The population density was 99.0 inhabitants per square mile (38.2/km^{2}). There were 216 housing units at an average density of 44.0 per square mile (17.0/km^{2}). The racial makeup of the town was 95.27% White, 1.65% Black or African American, 0.21% Native American, 0.41% Asian, 0.62% from other races, and 1.85% from two or more races. 2.67% of the population were Hispanic or Latino of any race.

There were 193 households, out of which 34.7% had children under the age of 18 living with them, 62.7% were married couples living together, 10.9% had a female householder with no husband present, and 21.8% were non-families. 18.1% of all households were made up of individuals, and 9.3% had someone living alone who was 65 years of age or older. The average household size was 2.52 and the average family size was 2.83.

In the town, the population was spread out, with 25.7% under the age of 18, 6.4% from 18 to 24, 28.6% from 25 to 44, 25.5% from 45 to 64, and 13.8% who were 65 years of age or older. The median age was 39 years. For every 100 females, there were 98.4 males. For every 100 females age 18 and over, there were 92.0 males.

The median income for a household in the town was $33,056, and the median income for a family was $34,500. Males had a median income of $33,542 versus $17,045 for females. The per capita income for the town was $20,582. About 8.0% of families and 10.7% of the population were below the poverty line, including 14.2% of those under age 18 and 20.0% of those age 65 or over.
