= 2011 Rainsville tornado =

2011 tornado in Alabama

Coordinates: 34.3907°N 85.9784°W

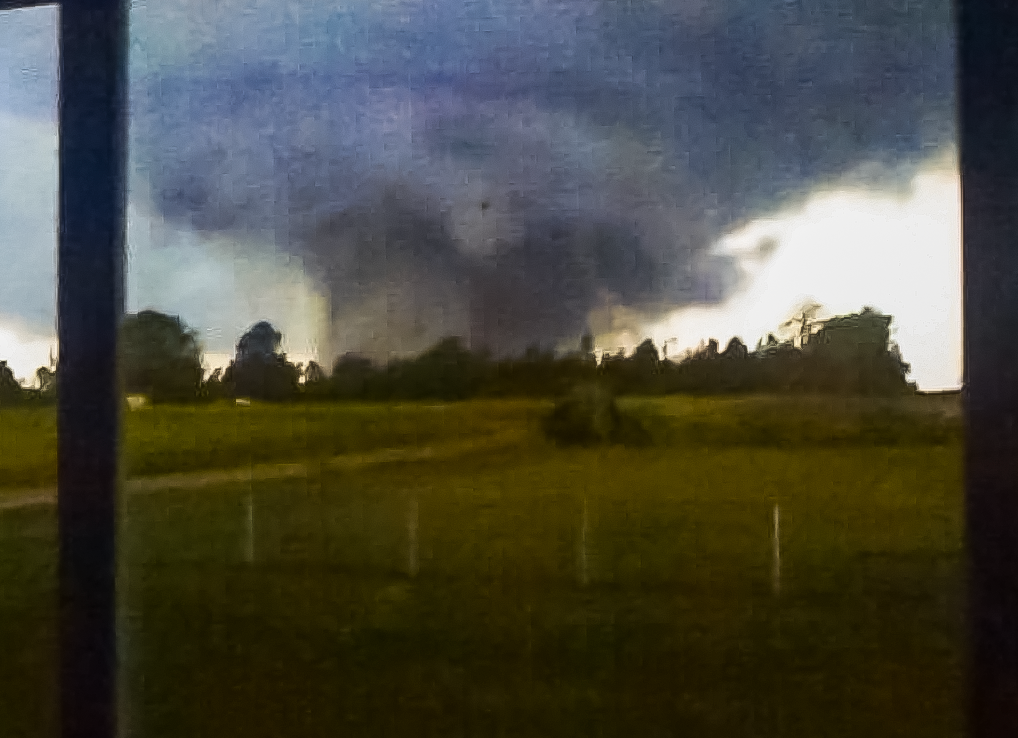
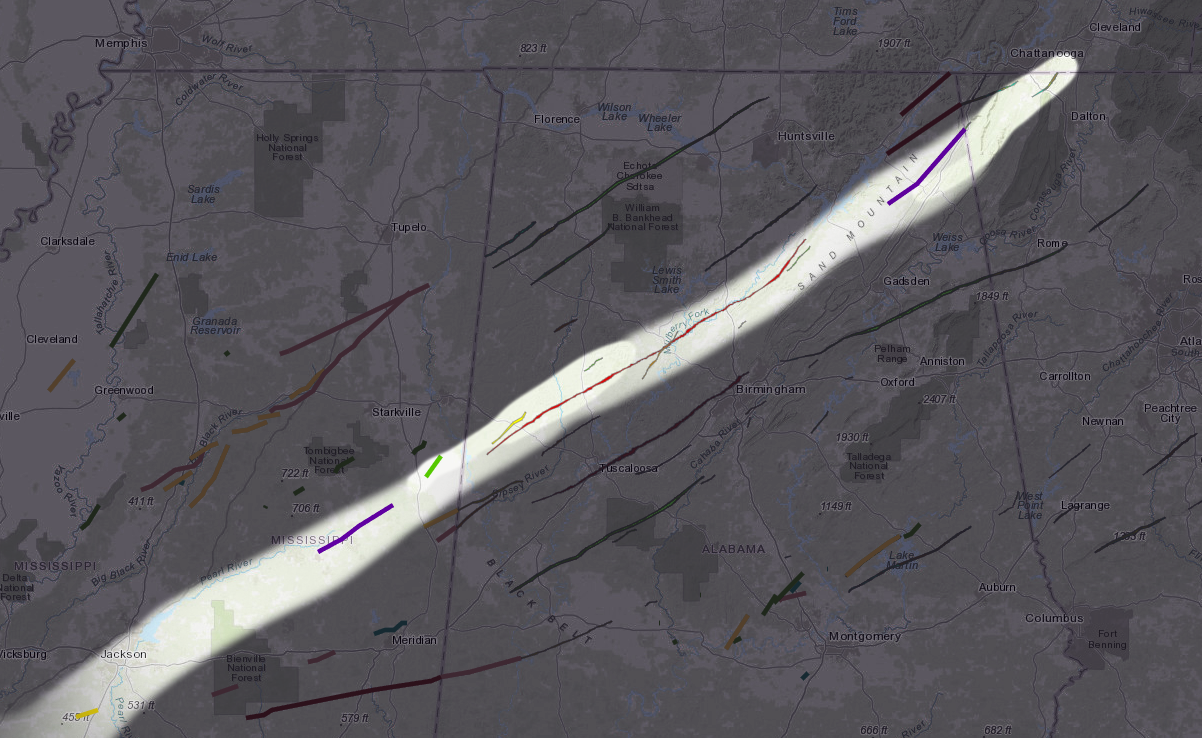
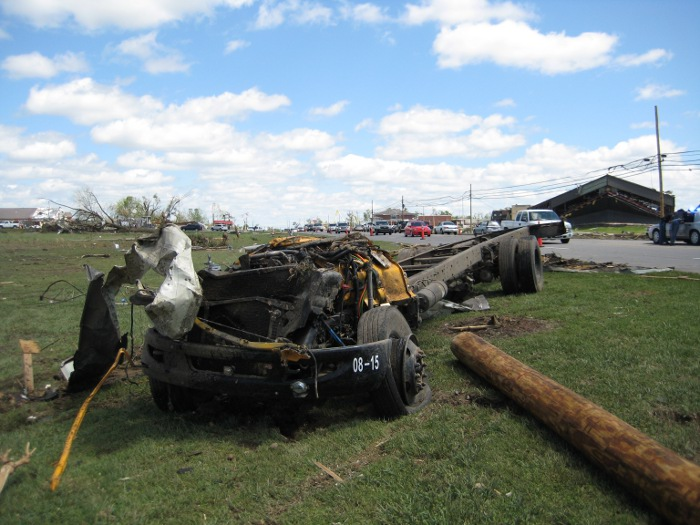
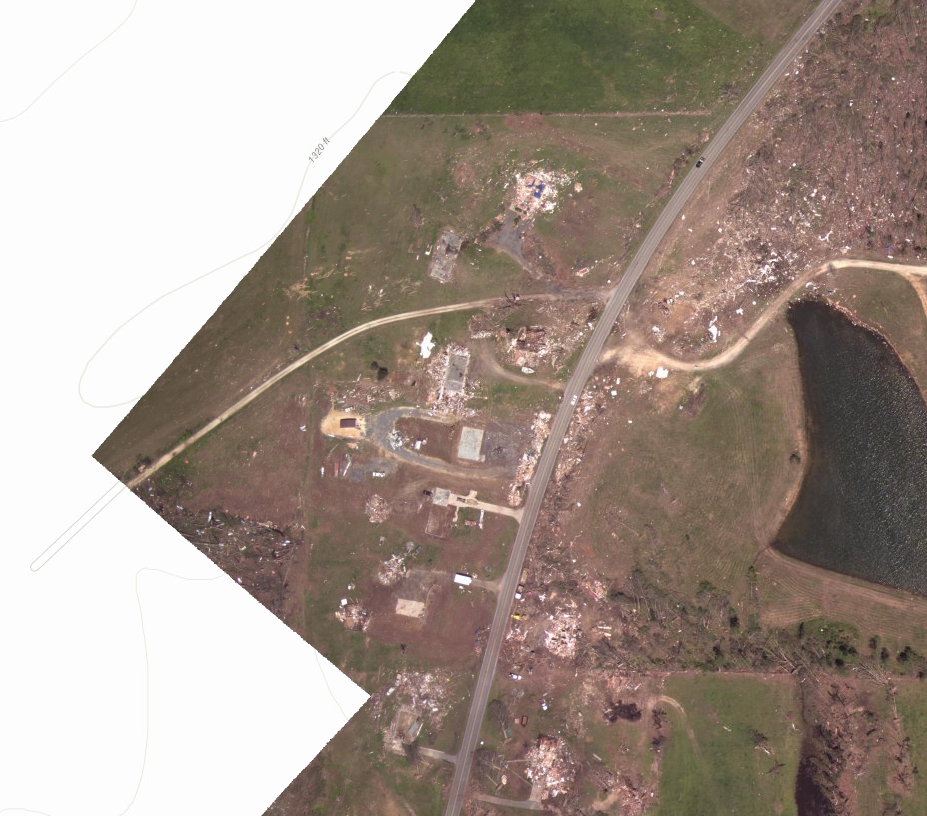
- Clockwise from top: The tornado exiting Rainsville at peak intensity; the track of the Rainsville supercell; aerial view of high-end EF4 damage to a neighborhood in Rainsville; A school bus stripped down to its chassis; radar loop of the tornado during its lifespan

Meteorological history
- Formed: April 27, 2011, 6:19 p.m. CDT (UTC–05:00)
- Dissipated: April 27, 2011, 7:55 p.m. EDT (UTC–04:00)
- Duration: 36 minutes

EF5 tornado
- on the Enhanced Fujita scale
- Max width: 1,320 yards (0.75 mi; 1.2 km)
- Path length: 36.63 miles (58.95 km)
- Highest winds: >200 mph (320 km/h)

Overall effects
- Fatalities: 25
- Injuries: Unknown
- Damage: >$10 million (2011 USD)
- Areas affected: DeKalb County, Alabama and Dade County, Georgia
- Part of the 2011 Super Outbreak and Tornadoes of 2011

During the early evening of April 27, 2011, an extremely powerful and devastating EF5 tornado, known most commonly as the Rainsville tornado, struck parts of northeast Alabama, causing immense damage, notably in the town of Rainsville, Alabama. It was the fourth and final EF5 of the historic 2011 Super Outbreak, the largest tornado outbreak ever recorded. The multi-vortex tornado remained on the ground for 36 minutes, carving a path of 36.63 miles (58.95 km) long through DeKalb County, causing 25 deaths, an unspecified yet sizable number of injuries, and an estimated $10+ million in damage.

The supercell thunderstorm responsible for this tornado first developed at around 1:45 p.m. CDT near Harperville, Mississippi. It swiftly moved northeast, producing an EF5 tornado in Mississippi and an EF4 tornado in Central Alabama before entering DeKalb County by 5:45 p.m. CDT. The tornado touched down at 6:19 p.m. CDT near the Lakeview community and quickly escalated in intensity. EF5 damage was noted in several pockets near Shiloh, Rainsville, and Henagar, where severe ground scouring occurred and numerous homes were destroyed, resulting in the multiple fatalities and injuries. The damage path was characterized by extensive tree damage, the complete destruction of structures, and extensive damage to property. The tornado eventually dissipated near Rising Fawn, Georgia.

2011 was a prolific year for tornadoes and tornado-associated fatalities, with multiple destructive outbreaks. In total, this specific tornado killed 25 people.

== Meteorological synopsis ==
=== Setup ===
The environmental conditions leading up to the 2011 Super Outbreak were among the "most conducive to violent tornadoes ever documented". On April 25, a vigorous upper-level shortwave trough moved into the Southern Plains states. Ample instability, low-level moisture, and wind shear all fueled a significant tornado outbreak from Texas to Tennessee; at least 64 tornadoes touched down on this day. An area of low pressure consolidated over Texas on April 26 and traveled east while the aforementioned shortwave trough traversed the Mississippi and Ohio River valleys. Another 50 tornadoes touched down on this day. The multi-day outbreak culminated on April 27 with the most violent day of tornadic activity since the 1974 Super Outbreak. Multiple episodes of tornadic activity ensued with two waves of mesoscale convective systems in the morning, followed by a widespread outbreak of supercells from Mississippi to North Carolina during the afternoon into the evening.

Tornadic activity on April 27 was precipitated by a 995 mbar (hPa; 29.39 inHg) surface low situated over Kentucky and a deep, negatively tilted (aligned northwest to southeast) trough over Arkansas and Louisiana. A strong southwesterly surface jet intersected these systems at a 60° angle, an ageostrophic flow that led to storm-relative helicity values in excess of 500 m^{2}s^{−2}—indicative of extreme wind shear and a very high potential for rotating updrafts within supercells. Ample moisture from the Gulf of Mexico was brought north across the Deep South, leading to daytime high temperatures of 77 to 81 °F (25 to 27 °C) and dewpoints of 66 to 72 °F (19 to 22 °C). Furthermore, convective available potential energy (CAPE) values reached 2,500–3,000 J/kg.

=== Forecast ===
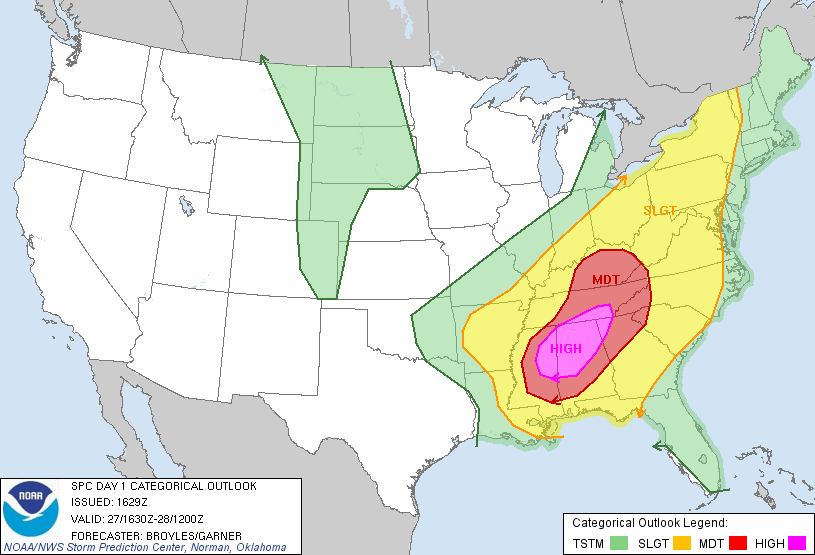
The National Weather Service Storm Prediction Center's Day 1 Convective Outlook for April 27, showing the Categorical Graphic

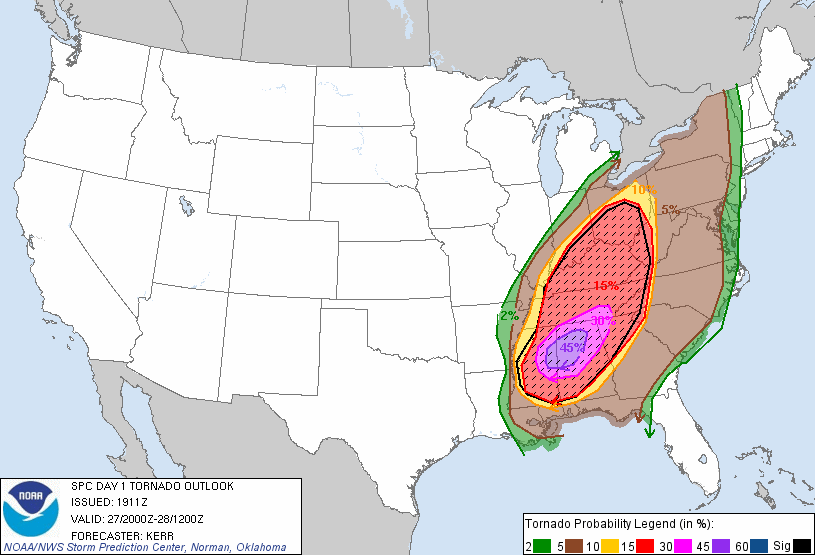
The probability of a tornado within 25 miles of a point (cross-hatched area: 10% or greater probability of EF2+ tornadoes)

On the morning of April 27, a strong cold front with several areas of embedded low pressure extended from the Texas Hill Country northeastward towards the Arklatex and the Ozarks, and later into the lower Ohio Valley. Warm, moist air was in place due to strong southerly flow ahead of the front over Mississippi, Alabama, and Tennessee. An upper-level disturbance sparked a broad area of showers and thunderstorms as it moved across the frontal boundary on the previous evening. The eastern edge of the line of showers and storms continued to move eastward, in concert with the upper disturbance, reaching the northwest Alabama border around 2:00 a.m. CDT.

This produced the last and most violent round of severe weather, which began around 2:30 p.m. CDT for northern Alabama as supercells began to line up to the southwest of the area. During the early afternoon, the potential for destructive tornadoes was highlighted by the Storm Prediction Center's upgrade to a high risk for severe weather around 1:00 p.m. CDT. This prompted a particularly dangerous situation (PDS) tornado watch, which was issued for northern Alabama and portions of southern Tennessee at 1:45 p.m. CDT. The bulletin that accompanied the watch read:

THE NWS STORM PREDICTION CENTER HAS ISSUED A TORNADO WATCH FOR PORTIONS OF: MUCH OF ALABAMA, NORTHWEST GEORGIA, SOUTHEAST MISSISSIPPI, SOUTHERN MIDDLE TENNESSEE, EFFECTIVE THIS WEDNESDAY AFTERNOON AND EVENING FROM 145 PM UNTIL 1000 PM CDT.

...THIS IS A PARTICULARLY DANGEROUS SITUATION...

DESTRUCTIVE TORNADOES...LARGE HAIL TO 4 INCHES IN DIAMETER. THUNDERSTORM WIND GUSTS TO 80 MPH...AND DANGEROUS LIGHTNING ARE POSSIBLE IN THESE AREAS.

The potential for tornadoes ramped up from noon through 9:00 p.m. CDT. During this period, much of Mississippi and Alabama experienced numerous supercell thunderstorms that produced violent tornadoes, including four EF5s tornadoes, one being the Rainsville tornado.

== Tornado summary ==
- Damage survey track of this tornado (centermost purple line), as well as the tracks of other EF3+ tornadoes that occurred during 2011 Super Outbreak. (Interactive map, click or tap to view in detail); View mapdata Key EF0 65–85 mph (105–137 km/h); EF1 86–110 mph (138–177 km/h); EF2 111–135 mph (179–217 km/h); EF3 136–165 mph (219–266 km/h); EF4 166–200 mph (267–322 km/h); EF5 ≥201 mph (323 km/h)

=== Touchdown and track into Lakeview/Fyffe ===
At around 5:45 p.m. CDT on the evening of April 27, the supercell thunderstorm began to re-intensify in northeastern Alabama. Initially, a severe thunderstorm warning was issued for the region, before a tornado warning was issued for the Lakeview community and surrounding areas at 6:10 p.m. CDT. At approximately 6:19 p.m. CDT (23:19 UTC), the tornado touched down in Lakeview, northeast of Geraldine.

The tornado began with relatively modest structural damage to smaller buildings and trees in the Lakeview area. The tornado ran parallel to SR 75, moving toward Fyffe. As it approached Fyffe, the tornado displayed multiple vortices, wavering between thin horizontal sub-vortices and a solidified wedge appearance. Swaths of trees around Beulah Baptist Cemetery, east of Lakeview, were snapped, and significant destruction of homes and trees was observed in Fyffe. Generally at EF3 intensity up to this point, the tornado moved toward Shiloh and intensified. Along Heaton Road, the tornado grew much wider, reaching EF5 intensity for the first time shortly thereafter. A metal farm building was completely destroyed, along with numerous homes, with some lower-bound homes being wiped off their foundations. The tornado maintained EF5 intensity, producing significant ground scouring, as it exited Shiloh.

=== Peak intensity near Rainsville ===
Just southeast of Rainsville, the tornado grew to one-half-mile (0.80 km) wide and reached EF5 intensity for the first time. Numerous homes, businesses, and public facilities were decimated, with little to no debris left behind. Vehicles were lofted hundreds of yards and mangled beyond recognition, including a school bus that was thrown across a highway, and stripped down to its chassis. A Huddle House was impacted with enough strength to distort its metal frame, and only one wall was left standing. Plainview High School sustained $10 to $15 million (2011 USD) in damage to the main school buildings, gymnasiums, sports fields, cafeteria, as well as the DeKalb County Schools Coliseum.

Many homes were swept clean from their foundations, their debris having been strewn up to a mile away. Trees were debarked, mobile homes were disintegrated, and homes anchored with bolts and foundation straps were destroyed. Along Lingerfelt Road east of downtown Rainsville, a stone house was destroyed at EF5 strength, the debris widely scattered. A large supporting cement and stone pillar at this property was uprooted entirely, lifting a section of the concrete foundation with it. Multiple vehicles were deformed and destroyed as well, with one tossed into a nearby ravine. Scouring of the ground and pock-marking were observed, and a considerable number of homes along Lingerfelt Road were swept away.

Several roads had their pavement stripped away, and at one residence that suffered EF5 damage, an 800-pound (360 kg) safe was pulled off of its anchorage and thrown over 600 feet (180 m) into a wooded area. When found, the safe's door had been ripped open and completely torn off. A pick-up truck of considerable size at this location was discovered dispersed in fragments, at a distance of over 250 yards (230 m) within the same forest area. The house's occupants took refuge in a storm pit situated nearby, and while left unharmed, the tornado partially exposed the storm pit, causing soil to be drawn up and removed from around the entrance. The force of the tornado caused another underground storm shelter to heave upwards slightly.

Slightly northeast of Lingerfelt Road, more extreme damage was discovered in another corridor from County Road 515 through a neighborhood along County Road 441. Multiple large, two-story homes were wiped completely off their foundations, and cars in this location were also lofted a considerable distance. Another section of pavement near this location was lifted up, and around the pavement significant ground scouring was present. While the damage was violent, almost all the homes in this location were identified to have poor anchoring, and this damage was rated high-end EF4.

=== Weakening and dissipation ===
The tornado continued across the eastern fringes of Sylvania, obliterating the Mountain View Baptist Church, pulling up a section of sidewalk, and sweeping away more homes. One home was found obliterated, with a couple being thrown into an open field; their bodies were later found by the police. Although some of these homes were inadequately anchored to their foundations, multiple residences were discovered to have been very well constructed, with adequate anchor bolting and foundation straps. Vehicles in the Sylvania area were mangled as well. More homes were leveled as the tornado tracked further northeast. In the High Point area, metal transmission truss towers were crumpled on County Road 112. Most homes in this area were poorly constructed and completely destroyed; however, large pieces of debris were found close by, suggesting a decrease in intensity. As the tornado moved southeast of Henagar and Ider, many hardwood trees were stripped; some had no stubs of any branches remaining and were partially debarked. A very old, one-story section of a church was completely destroyed near the Blake community. The tornado began to shrink rapidly after this. Upon crossing into Georgia near Fox Mountain, the tornado continued to produce high-end EF1 damage. The tornado tracked another three miles (4.8 km), crossing I-59 and moving through Rising Fawn, before finally dissipating outside the community at 6:55 p.m. CDT/7:55 p.m. EDT (23:55 UTC). The supercell responsible for this tornado would later go on to produce a high-end EF4 tornado that hit the town of Ringgold, Georgia about 30 minutes later, the fourth violent EF4+ tornado from the cell.

== Aftermath ==
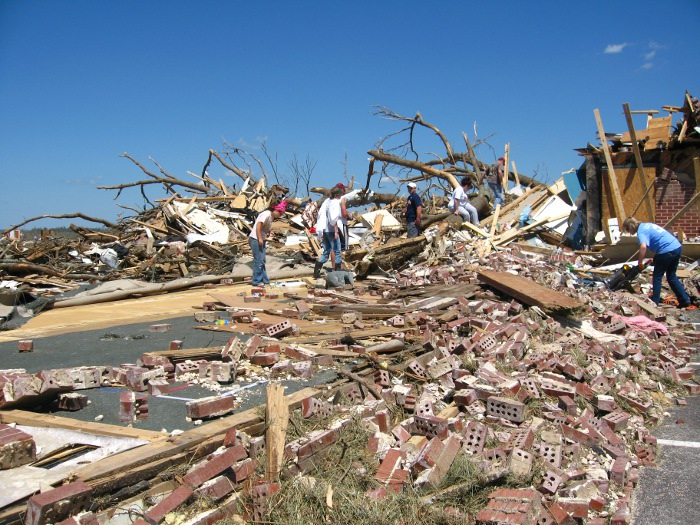
The remains of the Mountain View Baptist Church near Sylvania along Hwy 27.

Some tornado victims were missing for days following the tornado. Critically injured children were brought to the Children's Hospital in Birmingham. In the direct aftermath, Alabama Governor Robert Bentley declared a state of emergency for DeKalb County and other counties affected by the tornado outbreak. Congressman Robert Aderholt arrived in DeKalb County within days of the storms to survey the damage with FEMA Deputy Administrator Richard Serino.

In the towns of Fyffe and Rainsville, volunteer groups from local schools, churches, and community organizations joined forces to provide immediate assistance. The FTC issued their emergency plan to bring service back to areas, as other volunteers focused on removing debris, providing food and shelter, and offering emotional support to those affected. Similarly, in Georgia, community volunteers in Rising Fawn provided assistance to local residents with clean-up efforts and basic needs. The American Red Cross set up a disaster relief center in Rainsville at the local high school, offering shelter, food, and counseling to those affected. The Salvation Army also worked diligently, setting up mobile feeding units in each of the heavily impacted areas. The Southern Baptist Convention served food and aid for those affected in Rainsville as well. Many funerals took place in Rainsville in the weeks following the event.

Months after April 27, many citizens affected in the area gathered with FEMA at the Tom Bevill Enrichment Center in Rainsville to discuss ways to rebuild the area.

== See also ==
- List of F5 and EF5 tornadoes
- List of tornadoes in the 2011 Super Outbreak
- List of United States tornado emergencies
- Disagreements on the intensity of tornadoes
