= Crossville, Alabama =

- Town
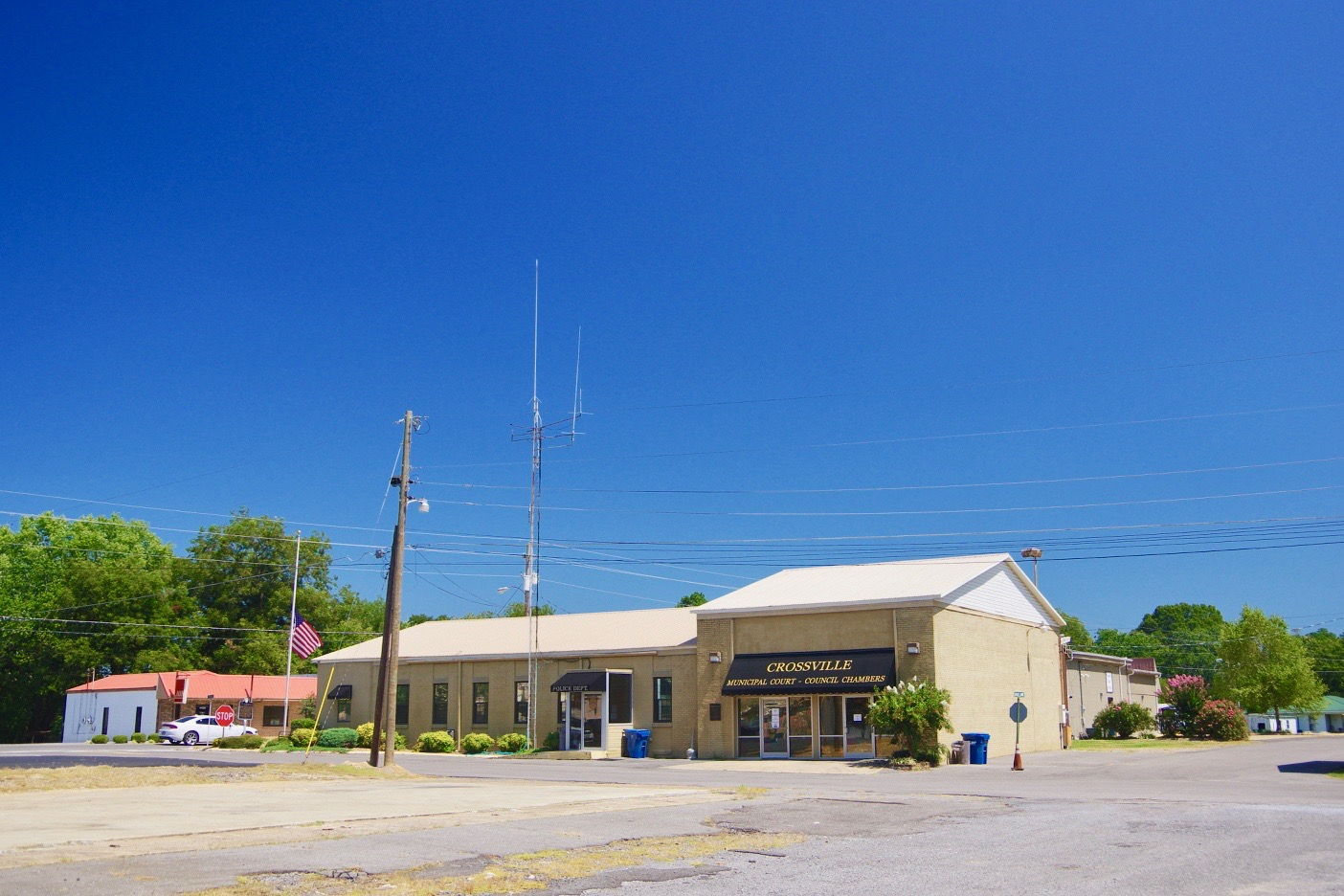
- Town Hall

- Logo

- Location of Crossville in DeKalb County, Alabama.
- Coordinates: 34°17′12″N 85°59′26″W
- Country: United States
- State: Alabama
- County: DeKalb

Government
  - Type: Mayor-Council
  - Mayor: Roger "Dino" Richards

Area
  - Total: 8.36 sq mi (21.66 km^{2})
  - Land: 8.36 sq mi (21.66 km^{2})
  - Water: 0 sq mi (0.00 km^{2})
- Elevation: 1,132 ft (345 m)

Population (2020)
  - Total: 1,830
  - Density: 218.8/sq mi (84.49/km^{2})
- Time zone: UTC-6 (Central (CST))
  - Summer (DST): UTC-5 (CDT)
- ZIP code: 35962
- Area code: 256
- FIPS code: 01-18856
- GNIS feature ID: 2406341
- Website: www.crossvillealabama.com

Crossville is a town in DeKalb County, Alabama, United States. As of the 2020 census, Crossville had a population of 1,830. Crossville is located atop Sand Mountain, a southern extension of the Cumberland Plateau.

== History ==
Crossville is a farming community in northeast Alabama, situated on the sandstone plateau of Sand Mountain. The native peoples called the plateau Raccoon Mountain. It holds some historical significance for having figured tangentially in the Creek War.. The area's soil, game, climate, and proximity to streams proved attractive to settlers, the majority of whom were drawn there from neighboring states following the expulsion of the indigenous Creeks..

Sand Mountain lay in an area that included disputed borders between the Creeks and the Cherokee. Although Alabama became a state in 1819, until the 1830s much of northern Alabama was still officially Cherokee territory. However, white settlement in the area increased steadily, coming to a head with the gold rush in the nearby mountains of northwest Georgia. While gold supplies began to dwindle, soon eclipsed by the California Gold Rush, the settlement by white farmers continued and played prominently in the expulsion of Cherokee, Creek and Choctaw nations from the area. That expulsion is called the Trail of Tears, considered an act of genocide because of the thousands who died on the journey, and the forced removal of native peoples from their home territories. (In nearby Fort Payne, which lies across the valley and at the foot of next-door Lookout Mountain, there is a historical sign marking the town as one of the starting points for the Trail of Tears, and also the area where Sequoyah lived, who developed the Cherokee alphabet.)

During the times of slavery, Crossville, Sand Mountain and DeKalb County, where Crossville is located, were not major slave areas. This can be verified by a study of census rolls which reveal a mostly poor area, where people worked and survived by the labor of their own hands, rather than the forced labor of captive Africans and their descendants. Leading up to the Civil War, DeKalb County was typical of Southern mountain counties in that it voted against secession from the United States. This can be corroborated by a study of the roster of the votes on this issue, county by county. In fact, there was serious discussion among Northern Alabama and East Tennessee counties about forming a proposed state of Nickajack, rather than going along with secession.

During the Civil War, DeKalb County families, particularly families from mountain terrains such as Sand and Lookout Mountain, tended at first to avoid fighting, since it was considered a "rich man's war", and not of particular interest to mountain people. However, as the war progressed, many DeKalb County families fought for Union cavalries, notably the 1st Tennessee & Alabama Independent Vidette Cavalry and the 1st Alabama Cavalry Regiment. A perusal of the cavalries' rosters will reveal family names that to this day are prominent in the area. The First Alabama Cavalry was particularly notable in that it was one of the few units that was racially integrated.

Crossville's name, given to it by James A. Copeland (1880–1964), not to be confused with the outlaw James Copeland), was meant to reflect its many crossroads.

In the mid-19th century, mail was brought through Crossville from Rome, Georgia, and Guntersville, Alabama, via stagecoach. Soon the town had its first U.S. post office, with A.C. Copeland serving as the first postmaster. In 1888, George Wyatt Justice established the first business in Crossville, and in 1903, W.B. Jones installed machinery for his cotton mills. His son Loy Jones (spouse-Sara Jones) followed his footsteps and ran a once successful business in Crossville. Loy and Sara had a daughter named Pam, and she had two sons named Blake and Blane Raley. The Jones family was vital to the growth early on in Crossville.

The first church established in the Crossville area was a Methodist Episcopal Church called Pine Bark Church, formed just prior to the Civil War. The community's first Baptist church was established in 1892 at Union Grove east of the town center. In 1925, several people started meeting at the high school and formed the First Baptist Church of Crossville. A new sanctuary was built in 1926.

Crossville established its first school, a one-room structure with a single teacher and approximately 50 students, in the late 19th century at Bryant's Chapel Church. The first banking institution was established in 1914 by N.W. Black and Boyce Rains. Soon after, Crossville was granted provisional incorporation, and Charlie J. Crump was appointed first mayor. Little progress was made during his tenure, and the incorporation's dissolution followed quickly thereafter. The town was incorporated a second time on December 21, 1942. Dr. Luther F. Erwin was chosen mayor, and the town government established ordinances and levied privilege licenses. Collection enforcement was lax, however, resulting in insufficient resources to maintain basic town services. Following this, C.W. (Bill) Russell was elected mayor. He hired Colonel Mack Kilcrease as a legal adviser to mayor and council. This group worked together to establish a solid town government with taxation, collection and basic town services that would become the foundation for the Town of Crossville.

== Geography ==
Crossville is located in southwestern DeKalb County at 34°17′12″N 85°59′27″W (34.286752, -85.990814). Alabama State Route 68 is the main road through the town, leading east 9 miles (14 km) to Interstate 59 at Collinsville and west 14 miles (23 km) to Albertville. Alabama State Route 227 also passes through Crossville, leading north 5 miles (8 km) to Geraldine and south 7 miles (11 km) into Big Wills Valley.

According to the U.S. Census Bureau, the town has a total area of 8.4 square miles (21.7 km^{2}), all land.

== Demographics ==
Historical population
Census	Pop.	Note	%±
1930	316		—
1940	436		38.0%
1950	609		39.7%
1960	579		−4.9%
1970	1,035		78.8%
1980	1,222		18.1%
1990	1,350		10.5%
2000	1,431		6.0%
2010	1,862		30.1%
2020	1,830		−1.7%
U.S. Decennial Census; 2013 Estimate

=== Racial and ethnic composition ===
Crossville town, Alabama – Racial and ethnic composition Note: the US Census treats Hispanic/Latino as an ethnic category. This table excludes Latinos from the racial categories and assigns them to a separate category. Hispanics/Latinos may be of any race. Race and ethnicity was not surveyed for populations under 2,500 in the 1980 census and under 1,000 in 1990 census.
Race / Ethnicity (NH = Non-Hispanic)	Pop 1990	Pop 2000	Pop 2010	Pop 2020	% 1990	% 2000	% 2010	% 2020
White alone (NH)	1,323	1,379	1,624	1,485	98.00%	96.37%	87.22%	81.15%
Black or African American alone (NH)	1	1	8	6	0.07%	0.07%	0.43%	0.33%
Native American or Alaska Native alone (NH)	14	7	31	31	1.04%	0.49%	1.66%	1.69%
Asian alone (NH)	1	2	3	2	0.07%	0.14%	0.16%	0.11%
Native Hawaiian or Pacific Islander alone (NH)	x	1	0	3	x	0.07%	0.00%	0.16%
Other race alone (NH)	0	0	0	0	0.00%	0.00%	0.00%	0.00%
Mixed race or Multiracial (NH)	x	9	41	56	x	0.63%	2.20%	3.06%
Hispanic or Latino (any race)	11	32	155	247	0.81%	2.24%	8.32%	13.50%
Total	1,350	1,431	1,862	1,830	100.00%	100.00%	100.00%	100.00%

=== 2020 census ===
As of the 2020 census, Crossville had a population of 1,830 and 654 households. The median age was 41.8 years. 23.7% of residents were under the age of 18 and 19.0% were 65 years of age or older. For every 100 females, there were 89.0 males, and for every 100 females age 18 and over, there were 90.1 males age 18 and over.

0.0% of residents lived in urban areas, while 100.0% lived in rural areas.

Of the town's 654 households, 30.6% had children under the age of 18 living in them. 50.2% were married-couple households, 17.9% were households with a male householder and no spouse or partner present, and 26.6% were households with a female householder and no spouse or partner present. About 25.6% of all households were made up of individuals, and 13.0% had someone living alone who was 65 years of age or older.

There were 719 housing units, of which 9.0% were vacant. The homeowner vacancy rate was 0.7% and the rental vacancy rate was 4.1%.

=== 2010 census ===
As of the 2010 census Crossville had a population of 1,862. The racial and ethnic composition of the population was 87.2% non-Hispanic white, 0.4% black, 1.9% Native American, 0.2% Asian, 0.1% Pacific Islander, 6.3% from some other race, 2.4% from two or more races and 8.3% Hispanic or Latino of any race.

=== 2000 census ===
As of the census of 2000, there were 1,431 people, 539 households, and 365 families residing in the town. The population density was 237.8 inhabitants per square mile (91.8/km^{2}). There were 593 housing units at an average density of 98.5 per square mile (38.0/km^{2}). The racial makeup of the town was 97.69% White, 0.07% Black or African American, 0.49% Native American, 0.14% Asian, 0.07% Pacific Islander, 0.56% from other races, and 0.98% from two or more races. 2.24% of the population were Hispanic or Latino of any race.

There were 539 households, out of which 33.4% had children under the age of 18 living with them, 53.2% were married couples living together, 10.0% had a female householder with no husband present, and 32.1% were non-families. 30.6% of all households were made up of individuals, and 14.7% had someone living alone who was 65 years of age or older. The average household size was 2.42 and the average family size was 3.04.

In the town, the population was spread out, with 23.5% under the age of 18, 7.3% from 18 to 24, 27.8% from 25 to 44, 20.0% from 45 to 64, and 21.5% who were 65 years of age or older. The median age was 40 years. For every 100 females, there were 81.6 males. For every 100 females age 18 and over, there were 76.9 males.

The median income for a household in the town was $31,394, and the median income for a family was $44,667. Males had a median income of $27,708 versus $20,461 for females. The per capita income for the town was $14,326. About 11.0% of families and 15.2% of the population were below the poverty line, including 21.5% of those under age 18 and 29.3% of those age 65 or over.

== Climate ==
Climate is characterized by relatively high temperatures and evenly distributed precipitation throughout the year. The Köppen Climate Classification subtype for this climate is "Cfa" (Humid Subtropical Climate).

Climate data for Crossville
Month	Jan	Feb	Mar	Apr	May	Jun	Jul	Aug	Sep	Oct	Nov	Dec	Year
Mean daily maximum °C (°F)	9 (49)	12 (54)	17 (62)	22 (71)	26 (78)	29 (85)	31 (88)	31 (88)	28 (82)	22 (72)	16 (61)	11 (52)	21 (70)
Mean daily minimum °C (°F)	−1 (30)	0 (32)	4 (40)	9 (48)	13 (56)	17 (63)	19 (67)	19 (66)	16 (60)	9 (48)	4 (39)	0 (32)	9 (48)
Average precipitation mm (inches)	130 (5.2)	130 (5)	150 (5.9)	120 (4.9)	110 (4.4)	100 (4)	110 (4.3)	86 (3.4)	110 (4.4)	79 (3.1)	110 (4.4)	130 (5.1)	1,380 (54.2)
Source: Weatherbase

== Education ==
Crossville Elementary, Crossville Middle, and Crossville High, home of the Lions, are located in Crossville. All are members of the DeKalb County School System. Crossville, as of the school year 2023–2024, is a 5A school and has the largest classification in DeKalb County. The school colors are black and gold. The Principal of Crossville High is Jon Peppers, the Principal of Crossville Middle is Brian Pool, and the Principal of Crossville Elementary is Kristin Williams.
