= Andrew Pope =

Andrew Pope may refer to:

- Andrew Pope (cricketer)
- Andrew Pope (singer)

== See also ==
- Andy Pope, American golfer
