= DeKalb County Schools =

DeKalb County Schools can refer to a U.S. public school system in several states, including:

- DeKalb County School District in Georgia
- DeKalb County Schools (Alabama)
