= Fyffe, Alabama =

- Town
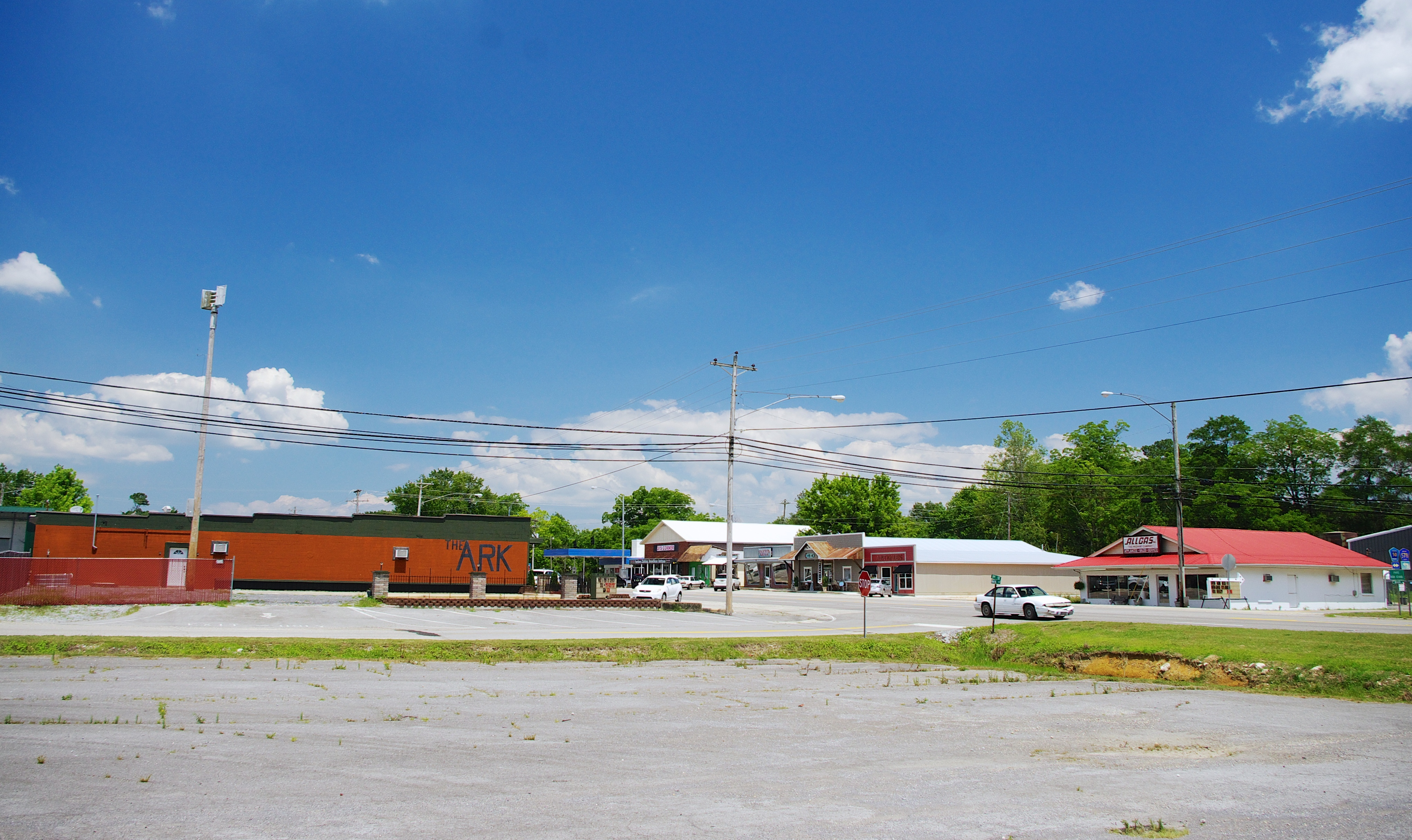
- Fyffe

- Logo

- Location of Fyffe in DeKalb County, Alabama.
- Coordinates: 34°26′48″N 85°54′23″W
- Country: United States
- State: Alabama
- County: DeKalb

Area
  - Total: 4.97 sq mi (12.87 km^{2})
  - Land: 4.97 sq mi (12.87 km^{2})
  - Water: 0 sq mi (0.00 km^{2})
- Elevation: 1,280 ft (390 m)

Population (2020)
  - Total: 967
  - Density: 194.7/sq mi (75.16/km^{2})
- Time zone: UTC-6 (Central (CST))
  - Summer (DST): UTC-5 (CDT)
- ZIP code: 35971
- Area code: 256
- FIPS code: 01-28672
- GNIS feature ID: 2406534
- Website: www.fyffecitylimits.com

Fyffe is a town in DeKalb County, Alabama, United States. It was incorporated in 1956. At the 2020 census, the population was 967. Fyffe is located atop Sand Mountain.

== History ==
Fyffe was founded in the 1880s. The origin of the name "Fyffe" is obscure, though it was apparently suggested by the Postal Service when the post office was established. A high school was established shortly afterward in 1917.

In 1959, Fyffe hosted the National Sacred Harp Singing Convention, a gathering of Sacred Harp musicians from around the region. Noted musicologist Alan Lomax recorded many of the performances at the convention.

An EF5 tornado struck this city on April 27, 2011, touching down in Lakeview, initially causing structural damage to small buildings and snapping trees. It grew in intensity, causing major structural damage to several homes and buildings before moving on to Rainsville, where damage was even more extensive.

== Geography ==
Fyffe is located at 34°26′49″N 85°54′24″W. The town is situated along State Route 75, southwest of Rainsville and Shiloh, near the eastern edge of Sand Mountain.

According to the U.S. Census Bureau, the town has a total area of 4.4 square miles (11 km^{2}), all land.

== Demographics ==
Historical population
Census	Pop.	Note	%±
1960	230		—
1970	311		35.2%
1980	1,305		319.6%
1990	1,094		−16.2%
2000	971		−11.2%
2010	1,018		4.8%
2020	967		−5.0%
U.S. Decennial Census; 2013 Estimate

=== Racial and ethnic composition ===
Fyffe town, Alabama – Racial and ethnic composition Note: the US Census treats Hispanic/Latino as an ethnic category. This table excludes Latinos from the racial categories and assigns them to a separate category. Hispanics/Latinos may be of any race. Race and ethnicity was not surveyed for populations under 2,500 in the 1980 census and under 1,000 in 1990 census.
Race / Ethnicity (NH = Non-Hispanic)	Pop 1990	Pop 2000	Pop 2010	Pop 2020	% 1990	% 2000	% 2010	% 2020
White alone (NH)	1,070	909	954	846	97.81%	93.61%	93.71%	87.49%
Black or African American alone (NH)	16	9	3	11	1.46%	0.93%	0.29%	1.14%
Native American or Alaska Native alone (NH)	0	12	15	20	0.00%	1.24%	1.47%	2.07%
Asian alone (NH)	0	3	7	5	0.00%	0.31%	0.69%	0.52%
Native Hawaiian or Pacific Islander alone (NH)	x	0	0	1	x	0.00%	0.00%	0.10%
Other race alone (NH)	0	0	3	0	0.00%	0.00%	0.29%	0.00%
Mixed race or Multiracial (NH)	x	20	23	58	x	2.06%	2.26%	6.00%
Hispanic or Latino (any race)	8	18	13	26	0.73%	1.85%	1.28%	2.69%
Total	1,094	971	1,018	967	100.00%	100.00%	100.00%	100.00%

=== 2010 census ===
As of the 2010 census Fyffe had a population of 1,018. There were 418 households. The racial and ethnic composition of the population was 93.7% non-Hispanic white, 0.3% African American, 1.5% Native American, 0.7% Asian, 1.1% from some other race, 2.5% from two or more races and 1.3% Hispanic or Latino or any race.

As of 2000, there were 971 people, 411 households, and 286 families residing in the town. The population density was 220.5 inhabitants per square mile (85.1/km^{2}). There were 458 housing units at an average density of 40.2 inhabitants per square kilometre (104 inhabitants/mi^{2}). The racial make-up of the town was 94.03% White, 0.93% African American, 1.24% Native American, 0.31% Asian, 0.00% Pacific Islander, 1.13% from other races, and 2.37% from two or more races. 1.85% of the population were Hispanic or Latino of any race.

There were 411 households, out of which 30.2% had children under the age of 18 living with them, 54.5% were married couples living together, 11.4% had a woman whose husband does not live with her, and 30.2% were non-families. 28.7% of all households were made up of individuals, and 14.4% had someone living alone who was 65 years of age or older. The average household size was 2.36 and the average family size was 2.84.

In the town, the population was spread out, with 23.9% under the age of 18, 8.3% from 18 to 24, 28.4% from 25 to 44, 22.1% from 45 to 64, and 17.2% who were 65 years of age or older. The median age was 37 years. For every 100 females, there were 85.0 males. For every 100 females age 18 and over, there were 85.7 males.

The median income for a household in the town was $30,298, and the median income for a family was $31,908. Males had a median income of $30,385 versus $18,636 for females. The per capita income for the town was $13,713. 21.6% of the population and 13.7% of families were below the poverty line. Out of the total people living in poverty, 33.6% were under the age of 18 and 19.9% were 65 or older.

== Government ==
Fyffe has a Mayor/Council form of government.

== Education ==
Fyffe High School, home of the "Red Devils," is a member of the DeKalb County School System. Fyffe will be classified as a 3A school in the 2024-2025 and 2025-2026 school years. The current Principal is Tim McCollum.

The Fyffe High School football team that has been known as a football powerhouse has led by legendary Coach Paul Benefield and has won multiple state championships in 2014, 2016, 2018, 2019, 2020, 2022, and 2023. They are viewed by most as one of the most dominant teams in Alabama class 2A history. The Fyffe High School basketball team won the state championship in 2021, led by Now-Retired Coach Neil Thrash. Fyffe High School's cheerleaders have also been a dominant team, winning 11 state championships in both 2A and 3A from 2012 to 2023.

The girls varsity basketball team dominated in the late 1980's and 90's. Led by coach Mike Cochran, his teams won state championships in 1986, 1992, 1994, 1995, 1996, 1997, and 2000.

== Arts and culture ==
The town of Fyffe was the location of UFO sightings on Friday and Saturday, February 11–12, 1989. More than 50 people (at a time when the town had less than 2,000 residents) called the Fyffe Police Department to report sightings on two separate occasions. This was later mentioned by late comedian Bill Hicks on his album (and video) "Relentless".

As a way of remembering the UFO sightings, Fyffe is home to an annual UFO (Unforgettable Family Outing) Festival every August and features hot air balloon rides available to the public as well as musical entertainment and outdoor games.

== Notable people ==
- Lowell Barron, Alabama state senator
- Vestal Goodman, Southern Gospel artist, founding member of the Happy Goodman Family
- Charlie Long, former professional football player
- Frank O. Slater, Navy sailor killed in World War 2. USS Slater named in his honor
- Bobby Wood, Tennessee state representative
