= Alabama State Route 62 =

State highway in Alabama, United States

State Route 62
- Monsanto Road

Route information
- Maintained by ALDOT
- Length: 2.443 mi (3.932 km)
- Existed: 1995–present

Major junctions
- East end: SR 227 near Guntersville
- West end: Milky way Road/former Monsanto facility entrance

Location
- Country: United States
- State: Alabama
- Counties: Marshall

Highway system
- Alabama State Highway System; Interstate; US; State
← SR 61	→ SR 63

State Route 62 (SR 62), also known as Monsanto Road, is a 2.443-mile-long (3.932 km) state highway near Guntersville in Marshall County. The highway heads east from lakeside homes and marinas along Lake Guntersville to SR 227 near Guntersville.

SR 62 previously provided access to a (now abandoned) Monsanto plant, for which it was built and named.

== History ==
The current incarnation of SR 62 was designated in 1995. Before then, the roadway was an unsigned county route. SR 62 is a four-lane divided roadway that serves to connect lakeside homes and marinas along Lake Guntersville with U.S. Route 431 (US 431) and SR 69 and SR 79 via SR 227. At its western end was the entrance to the now abandoned Monsanto production facility, which was the reason for SR 62 being built.

Between 1964 and 1993, SR 62 was assigned to the highway connecting Ohatchee and Alexandria in Calhoun County. That route is now signed as SR 144.

== Major intersections ==
The entire route is in Marshall County.

Location	mi	km	Destinations	Notes
	0.000	0.000	SR 227 – Guntersville, Geraldine	Eastern terminus
	2.443	3.932	Milky Way Road - Lake Guntersville	Current western terminus
	3.0	4.8	Monsanto plant entrance	Former western terminus
1.000 mi = 1.609 km; 1.000 km = 0.621 mi
