= Alabama State Route 227 =

State highway in Alabama, United States

State Route 227

Route information
- Maintained by ALDOT
- Length: 39 mi (63 km)

Major junctions
- South end: Duck Springs Road at the Etowah–DeKalb county line
- SR 68 at Crossville; SR 75 at Geraldine
- North end: US 431 / SR 79 at Guntersville

Location
- Country: United States
- State: Alabama
- Counties: DeKalb, Marshall

Highway system
- Alabama State Highway System; Interstate; US; State
← SR 225	→ SR 229

State Route 227 (SR 227) is a 39-mile-long (63 km) route that serves as a connection between the Etowah–DeKalb county line south of Crossville with U.S. Route 431 (US 431) at Guntersville in Marshall County.

== Route description ==
The southern terminus of SR 227 is located at the Etowah–DeKalb county line to the southwest of Hendrixville. From Hendrixville, the route travels in a northwesterly direction en route to Crossville. From Crossville, it travels in a northerly direction to Geraldine where it again resumes its northwesterly track.

Upon entering Marshall County, it takes a more westerly route before turning towards the south en route to its northern terminus at US 431 in downtown Guntersville.

== History ==
The southern terminus of SR 227 until approximately 1985 occurred on Meighan Boulevard in Gadsden, Alabama which is also US 278/US 431. The routing ran northward passing near the Noccalula Falls Park then crossing I-59 (exit 188), followed by an intersection with US 11 near Reece City and continuing onto Crossville, Alabama. The route between Meighan Boulevard in Gadsden and US 11 in Reece City is now designated as SR 211. The remainder of the former route between US 11 and the Etowah–DeKalb county line is now an Etowah county road until the SR 227 designation begins at the county line.

== Major intersections ==
County	Location	mi	km	Destinations	Notes
Etowah–DeKalb county line				Duck Springs Road	Southern terminus; begin state maintenance
DeKalb	Crossville			SR 68 west (Main Street) – Albertville	Southern end of SR 68 concurrency
DeKalb	Crossville			SR 68 east (Main Street) – Collinsville	Northern end of SR 68 concurrency
DeKalb	Geraldine			SR 75 – Fyffe, Albertville	
Marshall				SR 62 west (Monsanto Road)	Eastern terminus of SR 62
Marshall	Guntersville			US 431 north / SR 79 north (SR 1 north / Blount Avenue) – New Hope, Scottsboro	
Marshall	Guntersville			US 431 south / SR 79 south (SR 1 south / Gunter Avenue) – Albertville, Cleveland	Northern terminus; US 431/SR 79 follows a one-way pair between Gunter Avenue and Blount Avenue
1.000 mi = 1.609 km; 1.000 km = 0.621 mi: Concurrency terminus
