= Ider High School (Alabama) =

Coordinates: 34°42′33.26″N 85°40′16.12″W

Location
- 1064 Crabapple Lane; Ider, Alabama 35981; United States

Information
- Type: Pre-K-12
- Motto: Go Hornets!
- Established: 1907 (119 years ago)
- CEEB code: 011505
- Principal: Tyler Brooks
- Staff: 44.0 (FTE)
- Enrollment: 645 (2020–21)
- Student to teacher ratio: 14.7
- Colors: Black and gold
- Mascot: Hornets
- Website: iderhighschool.ss18.sharpschool.com

Ider High School is a Pre-K–12 school located in Ider, Alabama, United States. It is part of the DeKalb County School System.

== History ==
The Morona School was the first school located in Ider, AL. This school was a log cabin constructed in 1890. In the school's first year it had and enrollment of 22 students. In 1907 construction of a new two-story structure began. At that time the school was renamed Ider School.

Due to increasing demand from the community, a new school building was constructed in 1932. This school was sometimes referred to as the Rock School because the building was constructed out of stone. By 1939, Ider School was accredited and offered its students twelve grades of education. In 1950, a separate building was constructed to house the elementary students.

== Athletics ==
Ider High School has a number of athletic programs, segregated by gender. There are boys' football, baseball, and basketball teams along with girls' volleyball, softball, and basketball teams. Ider also has a marching band and a cheerleading squad.

The Ider High School mascot is a hornet and the school colors are black and gold.

Ider is known for a strong cheerleading program. In 1997, 1999, and 2001 the Ider High School cheerleading team won the World Cheerleading Association's Small Varsity Division National Championship. In 2001 the team was also COA Regional Champions, Cheersport Regional Champions, and 2A state Champions. The 2001 squad included Amanda Todd, LaWanda Moore, Katie Mann, Danielle Tinker, LaKeesha Abbott, Jessica Moore, Mechella Wicks, and Kayla Moon. In 2005 and 2006 they were COA National Champions. In 2007 the varsity cheerleaders won the 2A state championship.

Additionally, the softball team won the Alabama High School Athletic Association Class 2A state championship in 2006, 2008, and 2009. Pitcher Hillary Phillips, who played for the Hornets from 2004–09, was a part of all three championship teams. Because Alabama is one of only six states (alongside Arkansas, Delaware, Kentucky, Mississippi, and North Dakota) that allow seventh-and eighth-graders to play varsity sports, Phillips set the national record for career strikeouts, fanning 2,463 batters in her career.

== Student organizations ==
- Student government association
- Senior Beta
- Junior Beta
- Scholars' Bowl
- Mu Alpha Theta
- Spanish club
- Future Farmers of America
- Family, Career, and Community Leaders of America
- Yearbook club
- Prom committee
- Students Against Destructive Decisions
- Christians in Action
- Drug Abuse Resistance Education
- Ider High School fishing team
