= Alabama State Route 144 =

State highway in Alabama, United States

State Route 144

Route information
- Maintained by ALDOT
- Length: 26.663 mi (42.910 km)

Major junctions
- West end: US 231 north of Pell City
- SR 77 near Ohatchee
- East end: US 431 in Alexandria

Location
- Country: United States
- State: Alabama
- Counties: St. Clair, Calhoun

Highway system
- Alabama State Highway System; Interstate; US; State
← SR 143	→ SR 145

State Route 144 (SR 144) is a 26.663-mile-long (42.910 km) east–west state highway in the eastern part of the U.S. state of Alabama. It travels from U.S. Route 231 (US 231) in St. Clair County near Pell City to US 431 at Alexandria in Calhoun County. The highway is two lanes for its entire length. The highway also crosses the Coosa River using the bridge across the Neely Henry Dam.

== History ==
Until 1997, the section of SR 144 between SR 77 and US 431 was designated as SR 62. SR 62 is now assigned to a short highway in Marshall County. Also, the section of SR 144 between SR 77 and Ragland was signed as St. Clair County Route 26 (CR 26) until SR 144 was extended eastward.

== Major intersections ==
County	Location	mi	km	Destinations	Notes
St. Clair	Wattsville	0.000	0.000	US 231 (Heart of Dixie Highway/SR 53) – Pell City, Ashville	Western terminus
Coosa River		17.073	27.476	Neely Henry Dam	
Calhoun	Ohatchee	18.123	29.166	SR 77 – Lincoln, Southside	
Calhoun	Alexandria	26.663	42.910	US 431 (SR 1) – Anniston, Saks, Glencoe, Gadsden	Eastern terminus
1.000 mi = 1.609 km; 1.000 km = 0.621 mi
