= Mule Day =

Celebration in Columbia, Tennessee

Coordinates: 35.6125°N 87.0799°W

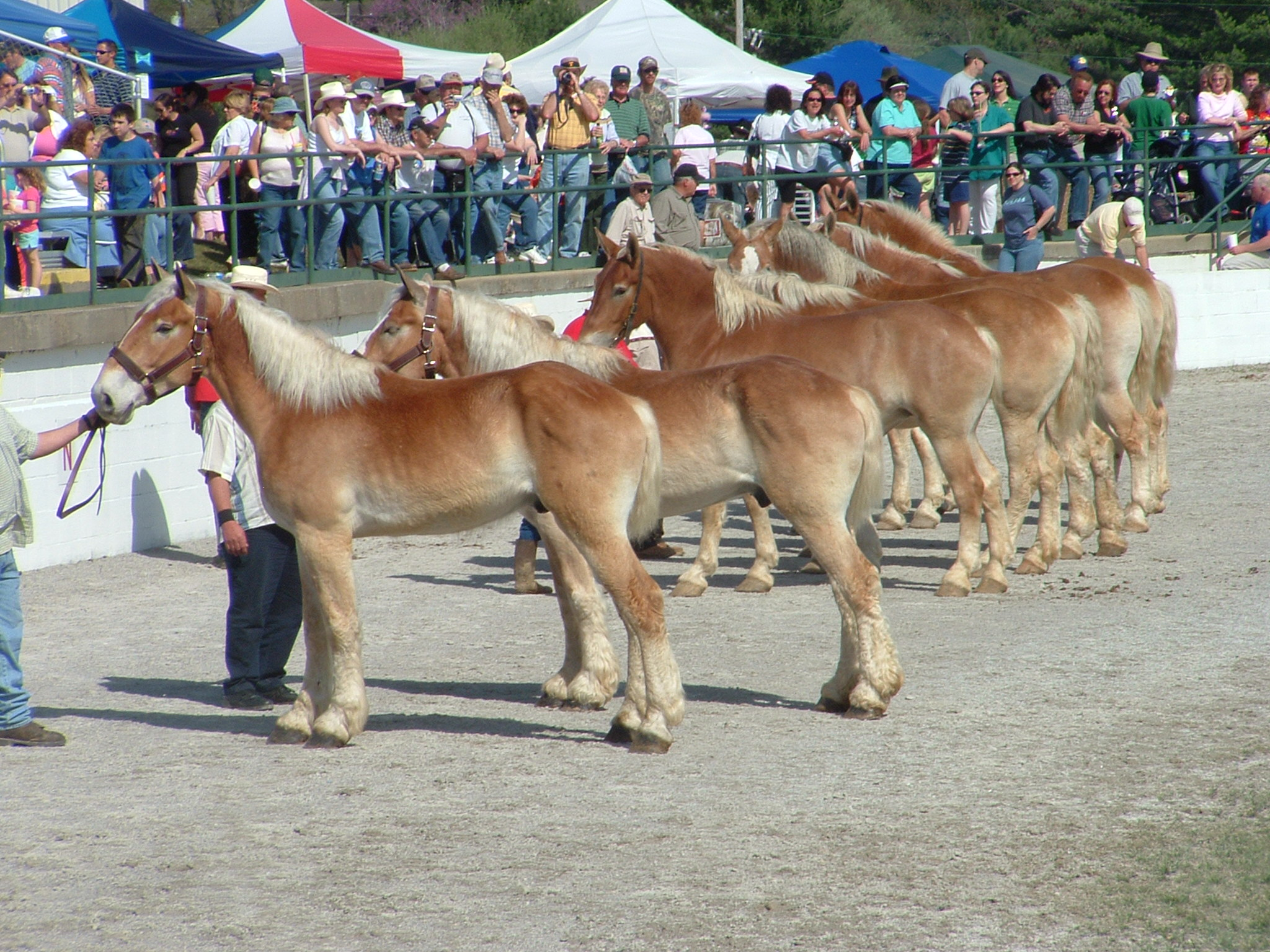
Lineup to be judged at Mule Day

Mule Day, an annual celebration of all things related to mules, is held in early April in Columbia, Tennessee, the self-proclaimed "Mule Capital" of the world. Begun in 1840 as "Breeder's Day", a meeting for mule breeders, it now attracts over 200,000 people and takes place over four days. In addition to mules, traditional Appalachian food, music, dancing, and crafts are featured.

== History ==
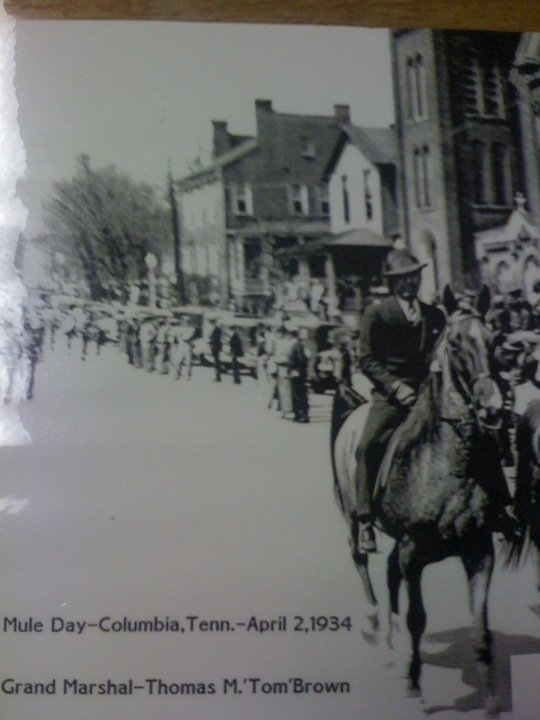

"Mule Day" has been a popular Columbia tradition for nearly 170 years, since the 1840s. It began as "Breeder's Day", a single day livestock show and mule market event held on the first Monday in May. Over time, "Mule Day" evolved from a single day event into a multi-day festival, attracting thousands of attendees, lasting almost a week. According to its official website, the heavy involvement of Maury County in the mule industry caused the event to grow for a time into "one of the largest livestock markets in the world."

In 1933, Thomas Marion Brown had the idea for a Mule Day Parade and Celebration as a way to bring in money to the community. He approached W.D. Hastings of the Daily Herald and J.J. Johnson to bring this event to life. They went to the Chamber of Commerce and in 1934 the First Mule Day Parade was a reality. Tom designed the Mule Day Crown which is on display in the Maury County Public Library. He was the first Grand Marshal and led the parade for about 7 years.

Mule Day suddenly gained wider notice in 2006 when the Mule Day Parade listing in the National Asset Database, a Department of Homeland Security (DHS) list of potential terrorism targets, was featured in a New York Times article.

Mule Day 2020 was cancelled due to Covid-19 Coronavirus. This is the second time a Mule Day celebration has been called off since the inception of the parade in 1937. The first was in 1942 shortly after the Japanese attack on Pearl Harbor bringing the US into WWII.

== Events ==
Mule Day celebrations include square dances, mule-driving contests, horse shows, crafts festivals, and flea markets. Other events include "working mule", "best of breed", lumberjack competitions and the Liar's Contest, a rural-themed story-telling competition. Food served at the event includes barbecue, roasted corn, home-made pies and funnel cakes.

Since 1934, the festival has been highlighted by a "Mule Day Parade" held on Saturday during the celebration. Floats in the parade compete, with winners in each judged category receiving awards such as ribbons or money. There is also a "Grand Marshal" each year during the parade. Some past Grand Marshals include 1998 Pat Summit (former UT Lady VolsBasketball coach), 2000 Lynette Cole (Miss USA), 2009 Phil Fulmer (former UT Vols Football coach), and 2012 Guy Penrod (gospel music).

== Other Mule Day (or Mule Days) celebrations ==
- Enfield Mule Days, Enfield, Illinois, began in 1921.
- Benson, North Carolina, began in 1950.
- Bishop Mule Days, Bishop, California, began in 1970.
- Calvary, Georgia, began in 1973.
- Winfield, Alabama, began in 1975.
- Ider, Alabama, began in 1987.
