= Shiloh, DeKalb County, Alabama =

Shiloh, Alabama
- Town
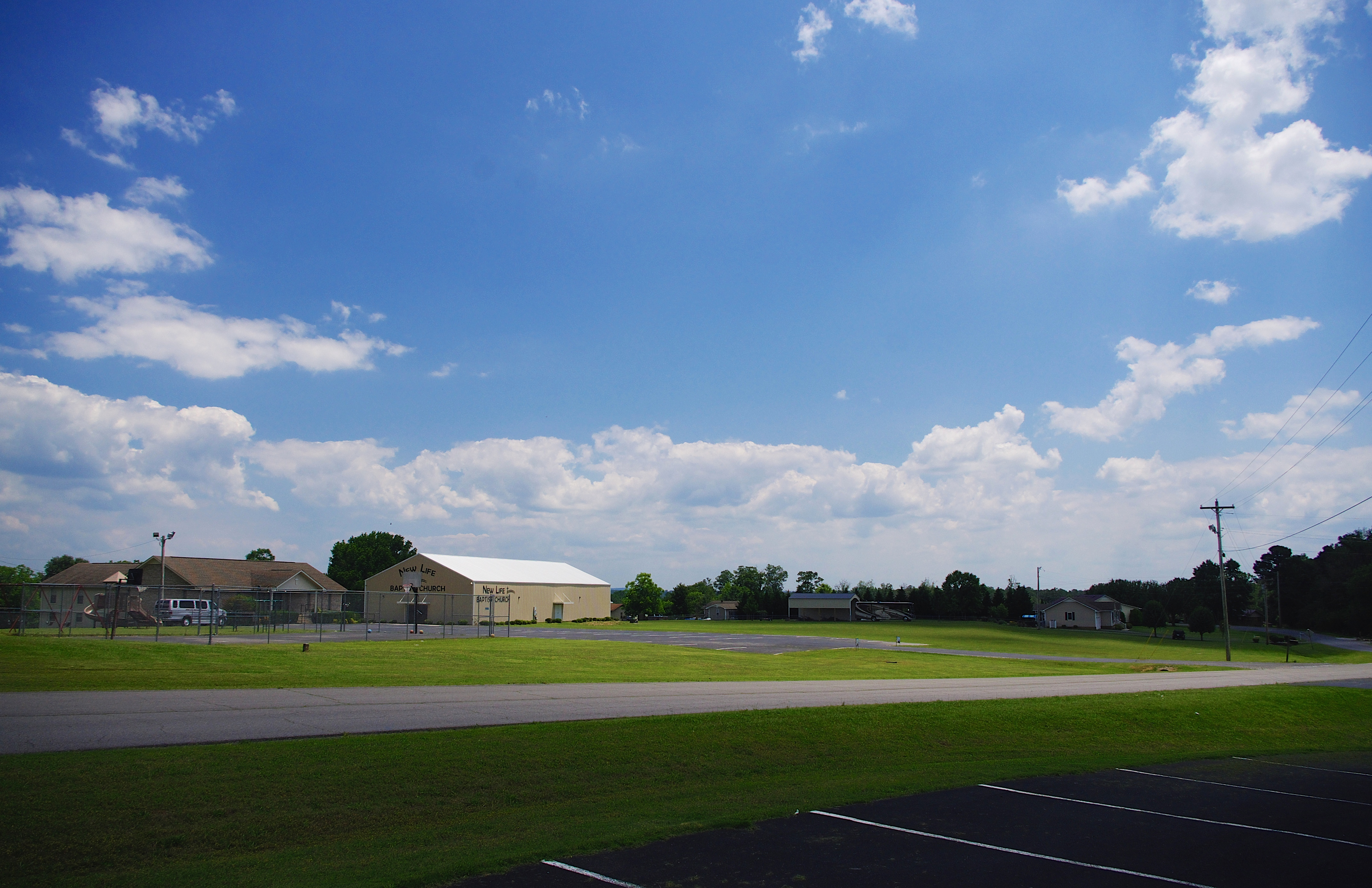
- Shiloh

- Location of Shiloh in DeKalb County, Alabama.
- Coordinates: 34°27′55″N 85°52′38″W
- Country: United States
- State: Alabama
- County: DeKalb

Area
  - Total: 2.13 sq mi (5.52 km^{2})
  - Land: 2.13 sq mi (5.52 km^{2})
  - Water: 0 sq mi (0.00 km^{2})
- Elevation: 1,204 ft (367 m)

Population (2020)
  - Total: 321
  - Density: 150.6/sq mi (58.14/km^{2})
- Time zone: UTC-6 (Central (CST))
  - Summer (DST): UTC-5 (CDT)
- ZIP code: 35986
- Area code: 256
- FIPS code: 01-69840
- GNIS feature ID: 2407327
- Website: townofshiloh.com

Shiloh is a town in DeKalb County, Alabama, United States. It incorporated in 1962. At the 2020 census, the population was 321. Shiloh is located atop Sand Mountain.

Shiloh is the subject of a dispute over repeated flooding of homes, caused by the expansion and raising of Alabama State Route 75. An agreement to fix this problem has not been implemented.

== Geography ==
Shiloh is located west of the center of DeKalb County at 34°27′56″N 85°52′38″W at an elevation of 1,263 feet (385 m). It is bordered to the northeast by the city of Rainsville and to the southwest by the town of Fyffe. Alabama State Route 75 passes through Shiloh, connecting Rainsville and Fyffe.

According to the U.S. Census Bureau, Shiloh has a total area of 1.7 square miles (4.4 km^{2}), all land.

== Demographics ==
Historical population
Census	Pop.	Note	%±
1970	233		—
1980	297		27.5%
1990	252		−15.2%
2000	289		14.7%
2010	274		−5.2%
2020	321		17.2%
U.S. Decennial Census; 2013 Estimate

As of the census of 2000, there were 289 people, 116 households, and 80 families residing in the town. The population density was 168.5 inhabitants per square mile (65.1/km^{2}). There were 135 housing units at an average density of 78.7 per square mile (30.4/km^{2}). The racial makeup of the town was 97.58% White, 1.38% Native American, 0.35% from other races, and 0.69% from two or more races. Hispanic or Latino of any race were 0.69% of the population.

There were 116 households, out of which 30.2% had children under the age of 18 living with them, 55.2% were married couples living together, 11.2% had a female householder with no husband present, and 30.2% were non-families. 25.9% of all households were made up of individuals, and 9.5% had someone living alone who was 65 years of age or older. The average household size was 2.49 and the average family size was 3.00.

In the town, the population was spread out, with 22.8% under the age of 18, 10.7% from 18 to 24, 31.1% from 25 to 44, 20.1% from 45 to 64, and 15.2% who were 65 years of age or older. The median age was 35 years. For every 100 females, there were 86.5 males. For every 100 females age 18 and over, there were 84.3 males.

The median income for a household in the town was $34,861, and the median income for a family was $36,696. Males had a median income of $29,219 versus $25,893 for females. The per capita income for the town was $28,431. About 4.3% of families and 9.7% of the population were below the poverty line, including 8.2% under the age of 18 and 15.2% ages 65 or older.

== April 27, 2011 tornado ==
On April 27, 2011, during the infamous 2011 Super Outbreak, the city of Shiloh took a direct hit from a large and extremely violent EF5 tornado. Catastrophic damage was documented in the town. 5 people were killed in the city. The tornado would then strike Rainsville, Alabama causing catastrophic damage to the city.
