= 1st Tennessee & Alabama Independent Vidette Cavalry =

Union Army cavalry regiment

- Active: September 10, 1863 – June 16, 1864
- Disbanded: June 16, 1864
- Country: United States
- Allegiance: Union
- Branch: Cavalry
- Engagements: American Civil War

The 1st Tennessee and Alabama Vidette Cavalry served in the Union Army between September 10, 1863, and June 16, 1864, during the American Civil War.

== Service ==
Companies "A", "B", "C", "G" and "H" were organized at Stevenson and Bridgeport, Alabama, between September 10, 1863, to June 16, 1864. Companies "D", "E" and "F", were organized at Tracy City and Nashville, Tennessee, between December 9, 1863, to February 24, 1864. The vidette cavalry participated in the skirmish at Hunt's Mills near Larkinsville, Alabama. They were a part of an expedition to Lebanon between December 12 and 29. Another skirmish at Sand Mountain in Jackson County (Sand Mountain is large and goes from northern Alabama into Georgia), December 26. They were mustered out on June 16, 1864.

== See also ==
- List of Alabama Union Civil War regiments

== Bibliography ==
- Dyer, Frederick H. (1959). A Compendium of the War of the Rebellion. New York and London. Thomas Yoseloff, Publisher. LCCN 59-12963.
