= Lakeview, Alabama =

- Town
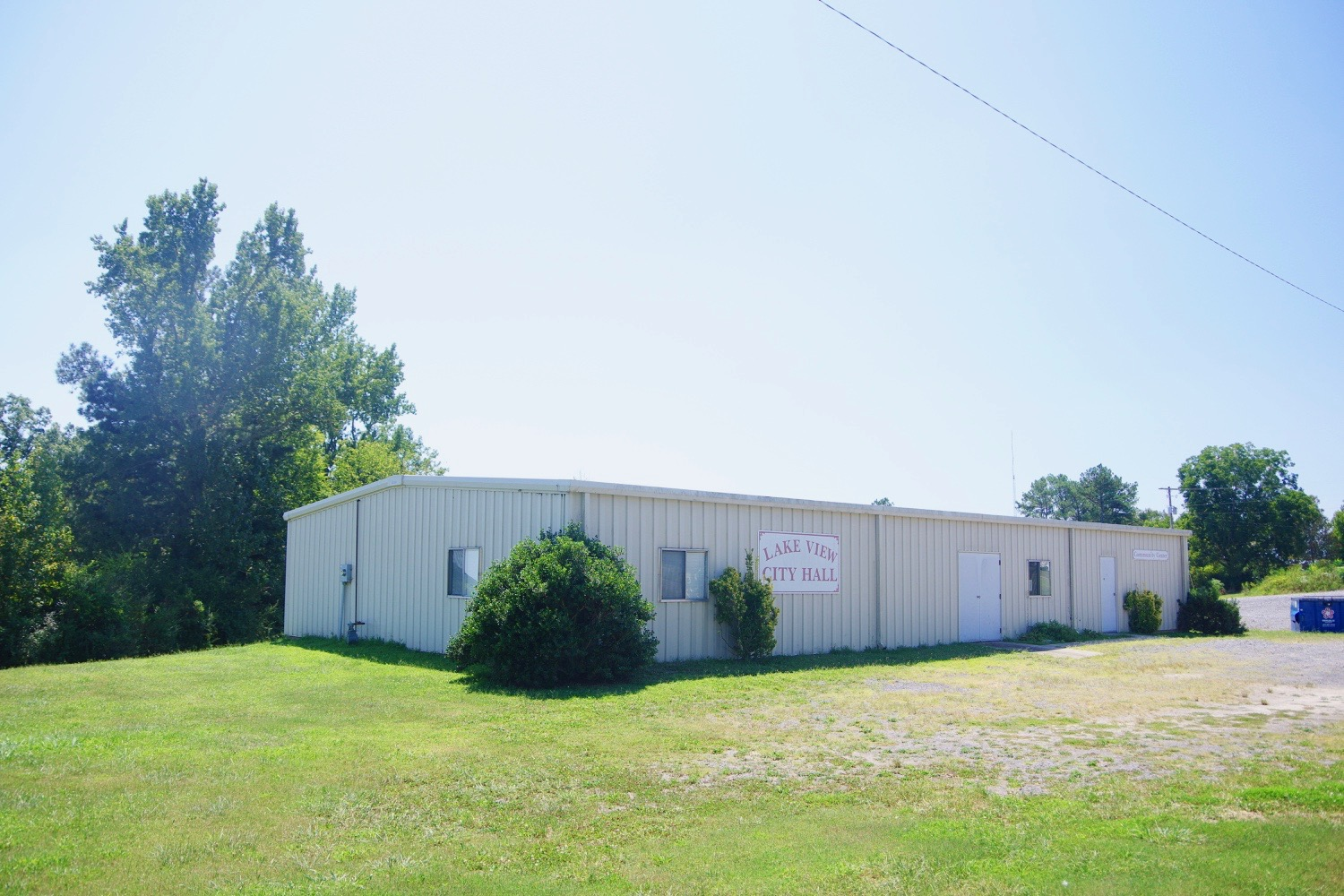
- City Hall in Lakeview

- Location of Lakeview in DeKalb County, Alabama.
- Coordinates: 34°23′32″N 85°58′24″W
- Country: United States
- State: Alabama
- Counties: DeKalb

Government
  - Mayor: Debra Maddox

Area
  - Total: 0.65 sq mi (1.68 km^{2})
  - Land: 0.65 sq mi (1.68 km^{2})
  - Water: 0 sq mi (0.00 km^{2})
- Elevation: 1,165 ft (355 m)

Population (2020)
  - Total: 161
  - Density: 248.4/sq mi (95.89/km^{2})
- FIPS code: 01-40888
- GNIS feature ID: 2405980

Lakeview is a town in DeKalb County, Alabama, United States. At the 2020 census, the population was 161. Lakeview is located atop Sand Mountain.

== Geography ==
Lakeview is located in western DeKalb County at 34°23′32″N 85°58′24″W (34.392298, -85.973244), along Alabama State Route 75, which leads northeast 10 miles (16 km) to Rainsville and southwest 2.5 miles (4.0 km) to Geraldine.

According to the U.S. Census Bureau, Lakeview has a total area of 0.62 square miles (1.6 km^{2}), all land.

== Demographics ==
Historical population
Census	Pop.	Note	%±
1970	13		—
1980	441		3,292.3%
1990	166		−62.4%
2000	163		−1.8%
2010	143		−12.3%
2020	161		12.6%
U.S. Decennial Census; 2013 Estimate

As of the census of 2000, there were 163 people, 65 households, and 49 families residing in the town. The population density was 259.7 inhabitants per square mile (100.3/km^{2}). There were 69 housing units at an average density of 109.9 units per square mile (42.4 units/km^{2}). The racial makeup of the town was 95.09% White, 3.68% Native American, and 1.23% from two or more races.

There were 65 households, out of which 30.8% had children under the age of 18 living with them, 63.1% were married couples living together, 10.8% had a female householder with no husband present, and 23.1% were non-families. 23.1% of all households were made up of individuals, and 13.8% had someone living alone who was 65 years of age or older. The average household size was 2.51 and the average family size was 2.94.

In the town, the population was spread out, with 22.1% under the age of 18, 5.5% from 18 to 24, 27.6% from 25 to 44, 26.4% from 45 to 64, and 18.4% who were 65 years of age or older. The median age was 42 years. For every 100 females, there were 103.8 males. For every 100 females age 18 and over, there were 92.4 males.

The median income for a household in the town was $36,250, and the median income for a family was $41,875. Males had a median income of $30,250 versus $13,500 for females. The per capita income for the town was $35,714. About 5.9% of families and 11.1% of the population were below the poverty line, including 16.7% of those under the age of 18 and 8.3% of those 65 or over.

== See also ==
- List of towns in Alabama
