= Andrew Pope (singer) =

American singer-songwriter

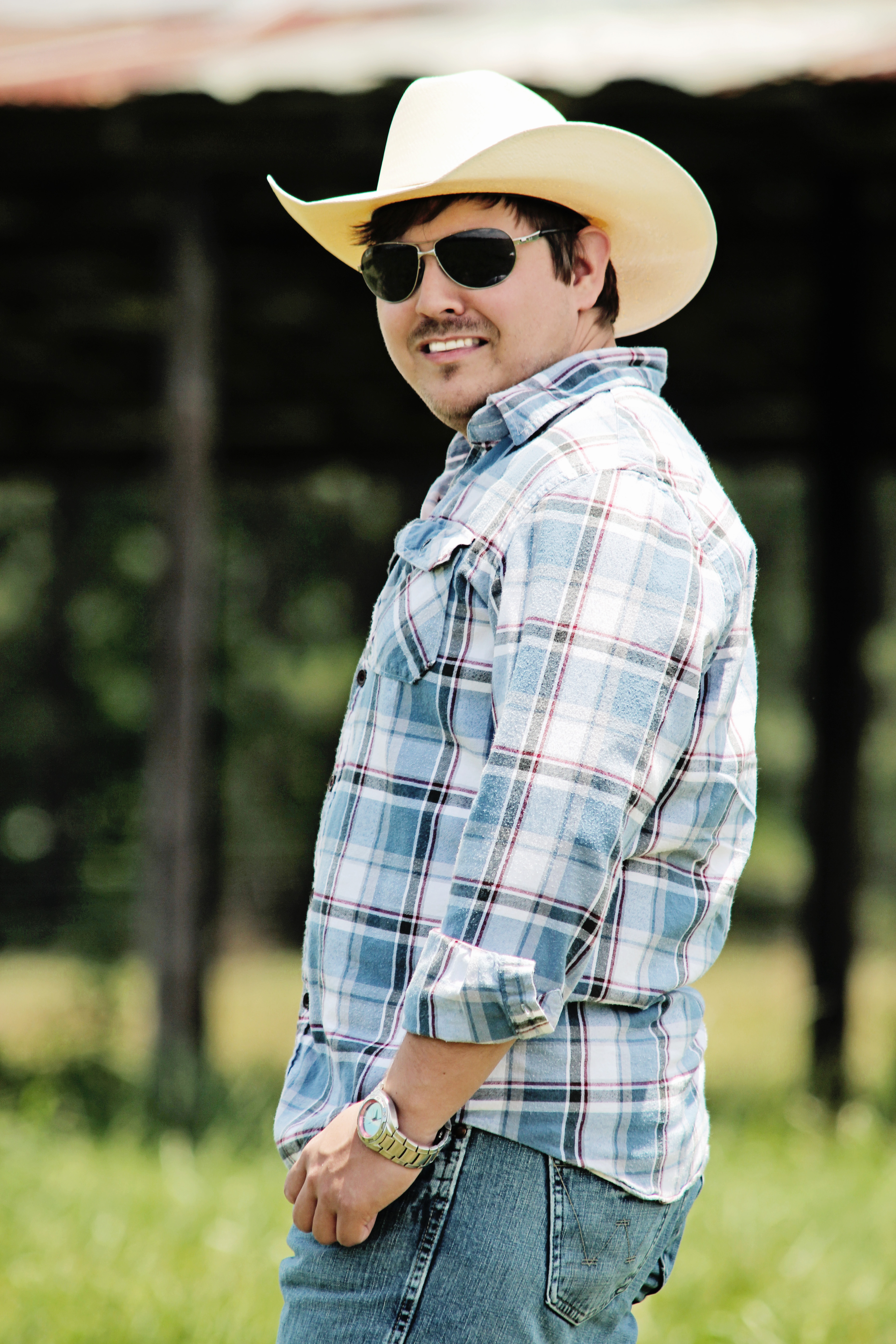
- Andrew Pope in 2012

Background information
- Born: William Andrew Pope; January 21, 1985 (age 41); Geraldine, Alabama
- Genre: Country
- Occupation: Singer/songwriter
- Instruments: Vocals, guitar, piano, bass guitar
- Years active: 2008–present
- Label: Alacob Music
- Website: andrewpopemusic.com

William Andrew Pope (born January 21, 1985) is an American country music singer and songwriter. Pope's music has been featured nationwide on SiriusXM radio. He has toured nationally alongside acts such as John Michael Montgomery, Mark Chesnutt, Shooter Jennings, David Allan Coe, John Schneider, and Sunny Sweeney. In 2019, his hit song, "Stoned On The One" was recorded by John Schneider and signifies one of Schneider's fastest rising hits to date, peaking at No. 30 on Music Row’s Country Breakout Chart.

== Early life ==
William Andrew Pope was born on January 21, 1985, at Dekalb Regional Medical Center in Fort Payne, Alabama. He is a native of Geraldine, Alabama, United States and he attended Geraldine High School. At a very early age, Pope was introduced to music. When he was with his mother and step-father, Pope would hear artists like Hank Williams Jr, Merle Haggard, and Lynyrd Skynyrd. Through attending a small church with his grandmother, he was exposed to southern gospel hymns and when he was with his grandfather he would hear folks like Hank Williams, Elvis Presley, and Fats Domino.

Pope would begin piano lessons at the age of 6. It wasn't long after that until Andrew's family realized he was a natural born musician. Pope, however, would not go on to pursue this until later in life. Pope was a rather shy child and other than playing the occasional "Sunday special" at his church, he did not want to perform in public. He would practice the piano day in and day out, by himself, and eventually he would create his own arrangements by listening to the notes.

At age 14, Andrew's mother borrowed an old guitar from a cousin and placed it in Andrew's bedroom. When Pope got home from school he noticed the guitar and, never having played one before, he picked it up and began to find a few basic chords, by ear. This would lead to Pope's new obsession. He would play this guitar every day until he got his very own for Christmas later that year. The first song Pope learned to play was "Tuesday's Gone" by Lynyrd Skynyrd. He had not yet figured out all of the chords for the song, but he learned to mimic the lead guitar parts, originally created/played by Lynyrd Skynyrd's Gary Rossington. Pope would not give up until he learned what would become the very first song he taught himself to strum, one of his favorites, Alabama's "My Home's in Alabama".

Pope wrote his first song at the age of 20, while going through a divorce. This would open the portal to his way of songwriting that is well known today.

Pope would then go on to graduate from Gadsden State Community College with honors, receiving an Associate degree in Business administration.

== Music career ==
Andrew Pope started performing at honky tonk bars in January 2008, alongside friend Tyler Cooper. The duo would eventually become known as "The Midnight Rounders", touring the Southeast region with over 100 dates per year, often playing only for tips. In 2010, Pope formed the band, Andrew Pope & Bootleg Whiskey. They toured heavily, mainly around the Southeast region, performing over 120 shows per year. The original lineup for Andrew Pope & Bootleg Whiskey consisted of:

Andrew Pope – Vocals, Guitar, Keys, Harmonica

Josh Pope – Keys, Guitar, Lead Guitar

Keegan Walsh – Bass guitar

Scott Paulson – Drums, BGVs

Ray Gressett (Replaced Josh Pope in 2011) – Lead Guitar

In 2012, Pope was discovered by MillTown Records and later signed an independent deal that would bring forth his debut album, "Here We Go" in November 2012. The album featured songs written by Pope as well as guest appearances from Confederate Railroad and Jeff Cook from country supergroup Alabama. "Here We Go" debuted at number 63 on the ITunes Country Album chart. After touring in support of the album, Pope began to immerse himself in his writing. From 2013 to 2016, Pope would go on to write some 300 songs. Frequent co-writers at the time included world class songwriters such as Mark Narmore, Larry Bastian, and Country Music Hall of Famer Bobby Bare.

In 2017, Pope would produce and release his second album, "Stoned On The One", under self owned music label Alacob Music. All songs featured on the album are written or co-written by Pope. It features guest appearances/contributions from folks such as The Bellamy Brothers, James Otto, and Larry Gatlin. "Stoned On The One" debuted at number 49 on iTunes Top Country Albums chart to high praise. Songs from the album are featured heavily in rotation on Shooter Jennings’ longtime running program, Shooter Jennings’ Electric Rodeo on SiriusXM Outlaw Country. In a 2017 Billboard article, Shooter Jennings would proclaim Andrew to "have a bright future in country music'.

In 2019, actor/singer-songwriter John Schneider recorded Pope's "Stoned On The One" for his album "Redneck Rebel". "Stoned On The One" has proved to be one of Schneider's fastest rising most successful songs to date, currently charting at number 39 on Music Row's Country Breakout Chart. On August 17, 2019, Schneider would invite Andrew as a guest to the Grand Ole Opry for the debut of Stoned on the One live. His performance was received to a standing ovation from the sell out crowd. Schneider says, "This is one of the best country songs I have ever heard and I am so lucky to be able to know and get to hang out with this man, Andrew Pope".

In 2020, Schneider recorded two additional songs written by Pope, "Comin' To" and "Haulin' Hell and Bayou Bound." The latter is featured in Schneider's newest film "Stand On It", a tribute to Smokey and the Bandit. Both songs are included on Schneider's newest album, "Truck On".

Pope plans to release new music in the near future with friend/producer Shooter Jennings.

== Podcasting career ==
In 2020, after months off of the road due to nationwide venue shutdowns, Andrew launched a podcast called "Pickin' It Out with Andrew Pope". The show features candid conversations between Pope and friends made from the entertainment business as well as the professional sports business. Folks such as Teddy Gentry from Alabama (band), David Bellamy from Bellamy Brothers, Ward Davis, as well as WWE Hall of Famers like Eric Bischoff, Gerald Brisco, and Diamond Dallas Page have guested. Pope does all recording, mixing, editing and publishing from his home.

== Y'all Think You Know ==
In April 2025, Andrew began making country music history videos that turned into the series "Y'all Think You Know Country Music?". Pope currently has published over 200 videos in this series, reaching millions of country music loving fans.

== Discography ==
=== Albums ===
Title	Album details	Peak chart positions
Title	Album details	US Country
Here We Go	Release date: November 6, 2012; Label: MillTown	63
Stoned on the One	Release date: May 5, 2017; Label: Alacob Music	49

=== Songwriting credits ===
Artist	Album/Film	Song
John Schneider	Truck On (2021) Album; Label: Maven Entertainment	Comin' To (Andrew Pope) Haulin' Hell and Bayou Bound (Andrew Pope)
John Schneider	Stand On It (2021) Film; Studio: Maven Entertainment	Haulin' Hell and Bayou Bound (Andrew Pope)
John Schneider	Redneck Rebel (2019) Album; Label: Maven Music	Stoned on the One (Andrew Pope, Mark Narmore, Dave Smith)
