= Ider, Alabama =

Town in Alabama, United States

- Town
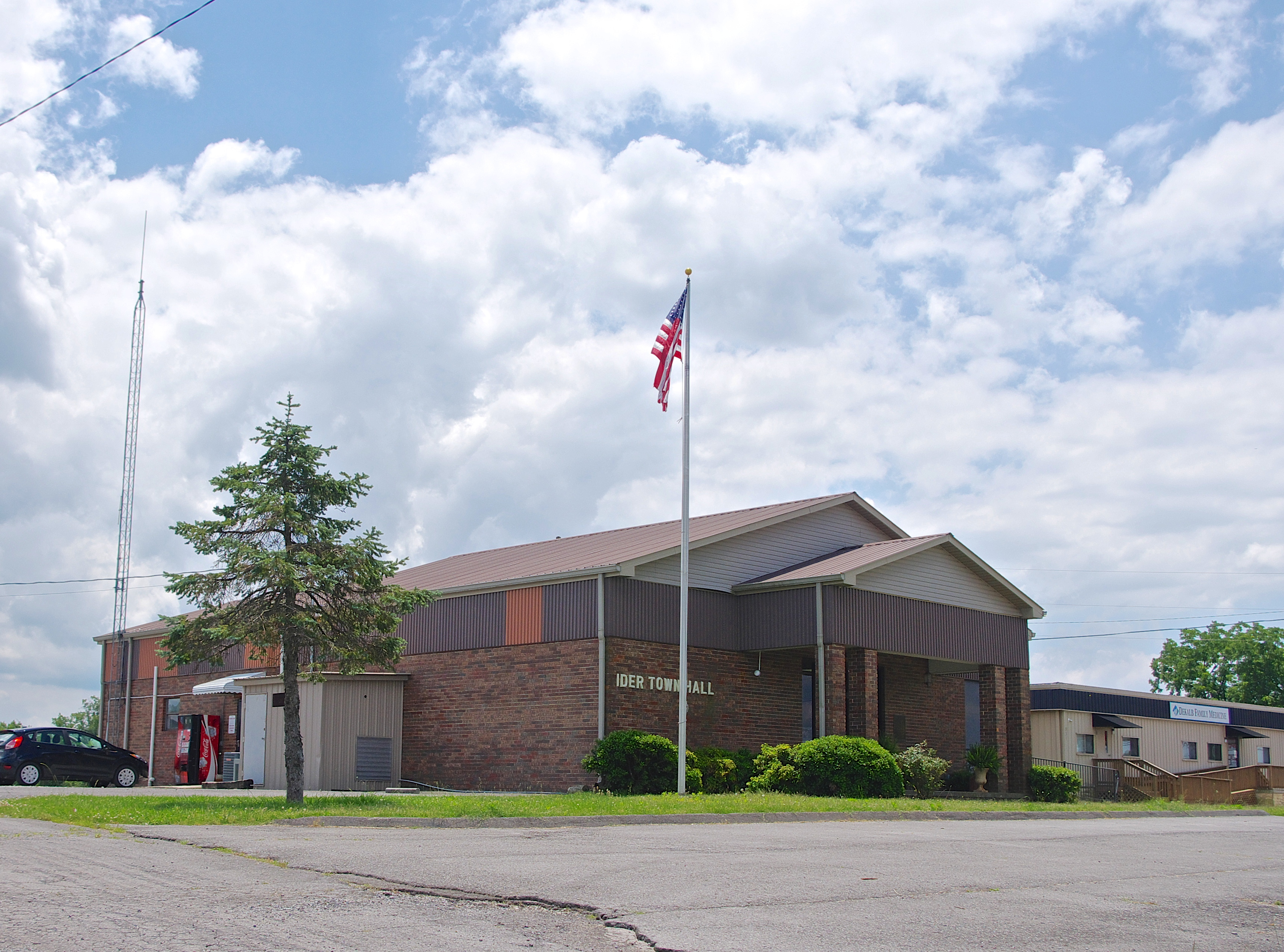
- Town Hall in Ider

- Location of Ider in DeKalb County, Alabama.
- Coordinates: 34°42′14″N 85°40′26″W
- Country: United States
- State: Alabama
- County: DeKalb

Area
  - Total: 5.43 sq mi (14.06 km^{2})
  - Land: 5.43 sq mi (14.06 km^{2})
  - Water: 0 sq mi (0.00 km^{2})
- Elevation: 1,562 ft (476 m)

Population (2020)
  - Total: 735
  - Density: 135.4/sq mi (52.28/km^{2})
- Time zone: UTC-6 (Central (CST))
  - Summer (DST): UTC-5 (CDT)
- ZIP code: 35981
- Area code: 256
- FIPS code: 01-37312
- GNIS feature ID: 2405880
- Website: www.townofider.com

Ider is a town in DeKalb County, Alabama, United States. At the 2020 census, the population was 735. It incorporated in October 1973.

== Geography ==
Ider is located at 34°42′14″N 85°40′26″W (34.703941, -85.673983). The town is situated atop Sand Mountain, a few miles west of the Alabama-Georgia state line. Alabama State Route 75 and Alabama State Route 117 intersect in Ider.

According to the U.S. Census Bureau, the town has a total area of 5.4 square miles (14 km^{2}), all land.

=== Major highways ===
- State Route 75
- State Route 117

== Demographics ==
Historical population
Census	Pop.	Note	%±
1970	379		—
1980	698		84.2%
1990	671		−3.9%
2000	664		−1.0%
2010	723		8.9%
2020	735		1.7%
U.S. Decennial Census; 2013 Estimate

As of the 2010 census Ider had a population of 723. The racial and ethnic composition of the population was 93.2% non-Hispanic white, 0.6% black or African American, 4.0% Native American, 0.1% some other race, 2.1% from two or more races and 0.1% Hispanic or Latino or any race.

As of the census of 2000, there were 664 people, 282 households, and 192 families residing in the town. The population density was 122.2 people per square mile (47.2 people/km^{2}). There were 310 housing units at an average density of 57.1 per square mile (22.0/km^{2}). The racial makeup of the town was 96.39% White, 0.00% Black, 1.20% Native American, 0.45% from other races, and 1.96% from two or more races. 0.60% of the population were Hispanic or Latino of any race.

There were 282 households, out of which 28.7% had children under the age of 18 living with them, 56.4% were married couples living together, 7.4% had a female householder with no husband present, and 31.9% were non-families. 29.4% of all households were made up of individuals, and 13.1% had someone living alone who was 65 years of age or older. The average household size was 2.35 and the average family size was 2.91.

In the town, the population was spread out, with 23.5% under the age of 18, 6.5% from 18 to 24, 29.5% from 25 to 44, 24.4% from 45 to 64, and 16.1% who were 65 years of age or older. The median age was 39 years. For every 100 females, there were 96.4 males. For every 100 females age 18 and over, there were 94.6 males.

The median income for a household in the town was $27,563, and the median income for a family was $36,146. Males had a median income of $30,139 versus $21,875 for females. The per capita income for the town was $15,040. About 13.6% of families and 19.7% of the population were below the poverty line, including 18.5% of those under age 18 and 18.6% of those age 65 or over.

== Climate ==
Climate data for Ider, Ala.
Month	Jan	Feb	Mar	Apr	May	Jun	Jul	Aug	Sep	Oct	Nov	Dec	Year
Mean daily maximum °F (°C)	48 (9)	53 (12)	61 (16)	70 (21)	77 (25)	84 (29)	88 (31)	87 (31)	82 (28)	72 (22)	61 (16)	51 (11)	70 (21)
Mean daily minimum °F (°C)	26 (−3)	28 (−2)	35 (2)	42 (6)	52 (11)	60 (16)	65 (18)	64 (18)	57 (14)	44 (7)	36 (2)	29 (−2)	45 (7)
Average precipitation inches (mm)	6.06 (154)	5.62 (143)	6.57 (167)	4.73 (120)	4.70 (119)	4.33 (110)	5.18 (132)	3.49 (89)	4.27 (108)	3.29 (84)	5.00 (127)	5.12 (130)	58.36 (1,483)
Source: Weather.com

== Education ==
=== School ===
Ider High School, which is a member of the DeKalb County Schools. For the 2024-2025 and 2025-2026 school years, Ider will be classified as a 1A school. The current Principal is Tyler Brooks.

=== Library ===
Ider Public Library - Located at 10808 AL HWY 75 The Ider Homemakers Club came up with the idea of creating a community library around 1994. The Ider City Council liked the idea and they facilitated the successful applications for county and state grants for funding the creation and operation of the new community facility.

== Culture and tourism ==
=== Attractions ===
- Ider Town Park has a lighted walking trail, a picnic area, tennis courts, baseball fields, a playground, and a stage.

=== Parades ===
Ider hosts three annual parades.

- Founders Day-Celebrating the history, heritage, and future of Ider, Alabama
- The Homecoming Parade usually takes place during the month of October. This parade kicks off celebrations centered on Ider High School's Homecoming football game.
- The Christmas Parade takes place every year in December. The Ider High School Band is part of the parade.

=== Festivals ===
Ider annually holds a festival known as Mule Day. This festival is held on Labor Day each year. Mule Day activities include horse and mule pulls, an antique tractor and car show, food, arts and crafts, gospel singing, and children's games. The event has been canceled as of 2017.

== Notable people ==
- Todd Greeson, member of the Alabama House of Representatives since 1998
- Jeffery Drewtholemew Rainer, number 2 science teacher in DeKalb County 2026.
