= Andrew Pope (cricketer) =

English cricketer

Personal information
- Full name: Andrew Noble Pope
- Born: 14 November 1881; Clifton, Bristol, England
- Died: 18 April 1942 (aged 60); Cheltenham, Gloucestershire, England
- Batting: Unknown
- Role: Occasional wicket-keeper

Domestic team information
- Years: Team
- 1911: Gloucestershire

Career statistics
Competition	First-class
Matches	2
Runs scored	46
Batting average	11.50
100s/50s	–/–
Top score	29
Balls bowled	–
Wickets	–
Bowling average	–
5 wickets in innings	–
10 wickets in match	–
Best bowling	–
Catches/stumpings	1/–
- Source: Cricinfo, 16 February 2012

Andrew Noble Pope (14 November 1881 – 18 April 1942) was an English cricketer.

Pope made two first-class appearances for Gloucestershire in the 1911 County Championship, both against Middlesex. In his first match at Lord's, Gloucestershire won the toss and elected to bat, with Pope being dismissed for a single run by J. T. Hearne in Gloucestershire's first-innings of 137. Middlesex made 186 in their first-innings, with Gloucestershire then scoring 146 in their second-innings, during which Pope was promoted up the batting order to bat at number three, scoring 29 runs before he was dismissed for a second time by J. T. Hearne. Middlesex reached their target in their second-innings with seven wickets to spare. In his second match at the Spa Ground, Gloucester, Middlesex won the toss and elected to bat, making 369 in their first-innings. Gloucestershire then made just 150 in their first-innings, during which Pope (who kept in this match in place of regular wicket-keeper Jack Board) was dismissed for 4 runs by J. T. Hearne. Forced to follow-on, Gloucestershire fared better in their second-innings, making just 156. Pope was again dismissed by J. T. Hearne, after scoring 12 runs. Middlesex won by an innings and 63 runs.

He died at Cheltenham, Gloucestershire on 18 April 1942.
