= Sylvania, Alabama =

- Town
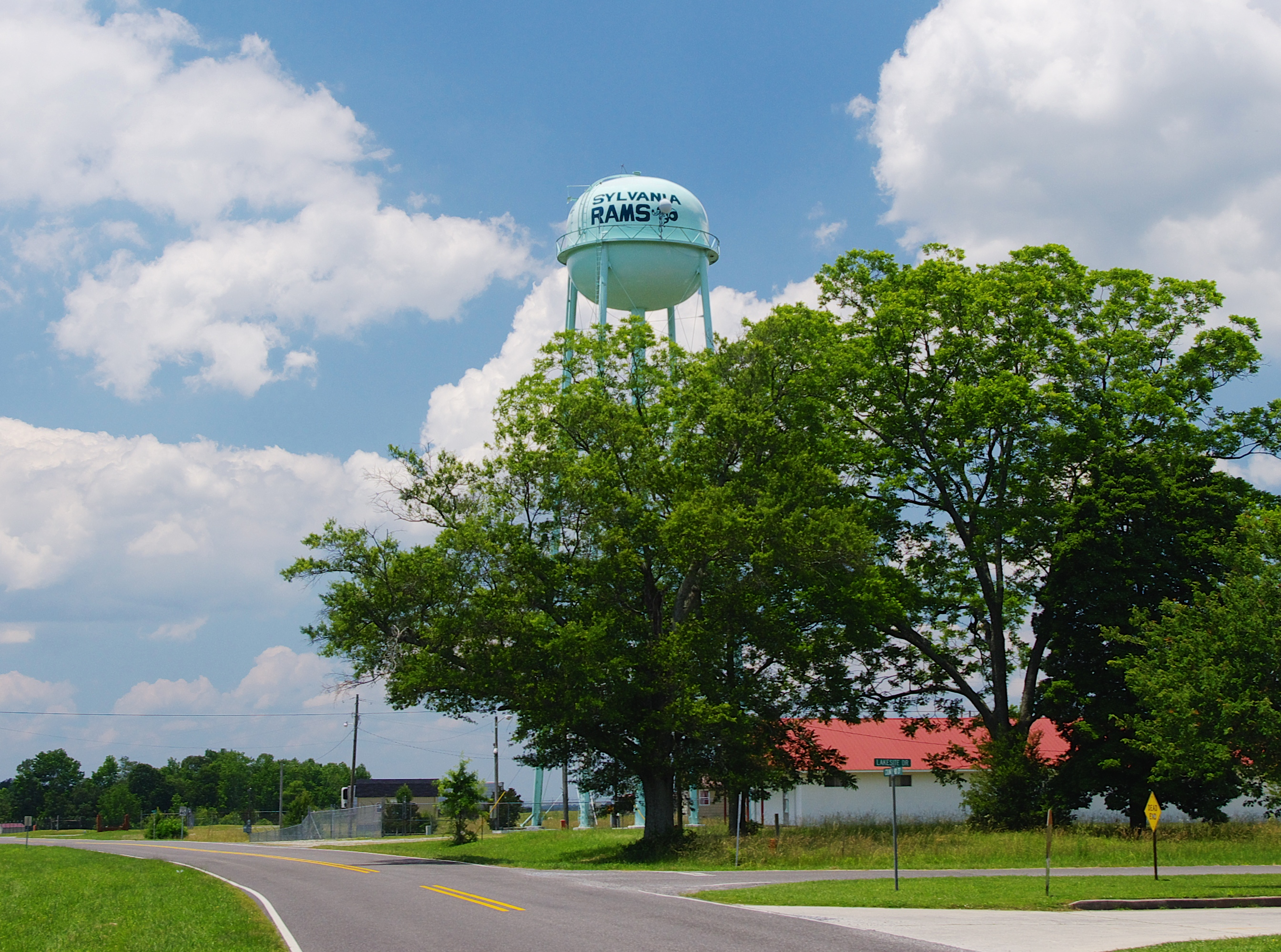
- Sylvania Rams water tower

- Location of Sylvania in DeKalb County, Alabama.
- Coordinates: 34°33′30″N 85°47′46″W
- Country: United States
- State: Alabama
- County: DeKalb

Area
  - Total: 8.61 sq mi (22.30 km^{2})
  - Land: 8.52 sq mi (22.06 km^{2})
  - Water: 0.097 sq mi (0.25 km^{2})
- Elevation: 1,352 ft (412 m)

Population (2020)
  - Total: 1,790
  - Density: 210.2/sq mi (81.16/km^{2})
- Time zone: UTC-6 (Central (CST))
  - Summer (DST): UTC-5 (CDT)
- ZIP code: 35988
- Area code: 256
- FIPS code: 01-74400
- GNIS feature ID: 2406707
- Website: www.sylvaniaalabama.com

Sylvania is a town in DeKalb County, Alabama, United States. Established in 1836 and incorporated in October 1967, As of the 2020 census, Sylvania had a population of 1,790. Sylvania is located atop Sand Mountain. The first post office was built in 1977.

== Geography ==
Sylvania is located north of the center of DeKalb County at 34°33′30″N 85°47′46″W (34.558304, -85.796154). Alabama State Route 75 passes through the town limits, leading northeast to Henagar and southwest to Rainsville.

According to the U.S. Census Bureau, Sylvania has a total area of 8.6 square miles (22.2 km^{2}), of which 8.5 square miles (21.9 km^{2}) is land and 0.1 square miles (0.3 km^{2}), or 1.16%, is water.

== Demographics ==
Historical population
Census	Pop.	Note	%±
1970	476		—
1980	1,156		142.9%
1990	932		−19.4%
2000	1,186		27.3%
2010	1,837		54.9%
2020	1,790		−2.6%
U.S. Decennial Census; 2013 Estimate

=== 2020 census ===
As of the 2020 census, Sylvania had a population of 1,790. The median age was 35.9 years. 26.1% of residents were under the age of 18 and 15.0% of residents were 65 years of age or older. For every 100 females there were 92.5 males, and for every 100 females age 18 and over there were 94.3 males age 18 and over.

0.0% of residents lived in urban areas, while 100.0% lived in rural areas.

There were 674 households in Sylvania, of which 36.6% had children under the age of 18 living in them. Of all households, 48.5% were married-couple households, 19.0% were households with a male householder and no spouse or partner present, and 27.6% were households with a female householder and no spouse or partner present. About 21.8% of all households were made up of individuals and 10.2% had someone living alone who was 65 years of age or older.

There were 759 housing units, of which 11.2% were vacant. The homeowner vacancy rate was 1.6% and the rental vacancy rate was 6.3%.

Sylvania racial composition
Race	Num.	Perc.
White (non-Hispanic)	1,471	82.18%
Black or African American (non-Hispanic)	9	0.5%
Native American	15	0.84%
Asian	1	0.06%
Other/Mixed	90	5.03%
Hispanic or Latino	204	11.4%

=== 2010 census ===
At the 2010 census there were 1,837 people, 674 households, and 505 families living in the town. The population density was 248.2 inhabitants per square mile (95.8/km^{2}). There were 750 housing units at an average density of 101.3 per square mile (39.1/km^{2}). The racial makeup of the town was 86.7% White, 0.2% Black or African American, 0.8% Native American, 0.2% Asian, 7.5% from other races, and 4.4% from two or more races. 11.2% of the population were Hispanic or Latino of any race. Of the 674 households 36.2% had children under the age of 18 living with them, 57.9% were married couples living together, 13.6% had a householder who was a woman with no husband present, and 25.1% were non-families. 21.2% of households were one person and 6.7% were one person aged 65 or older. The average household size was 2.73 and the average family size was 3.18.

The age distribution was 27.8% under the age of 18, 10.0% from 18 to 24, 26.6% from 25 to 44, 24.7% from 45 to 64, and 10.9% 65 or older. The median age was 33.8 years. For every 100 women, there were 97.5 men. For every 100 women age 18 and over, there were 92.5 men.

The median household income was $34,079 and the median family income was $40,648. Men had a median income of $35,417 versus $27,857 for women. The per capita income for the town was $17,793. About 22.3% of families and 24.0% of the population were below the poverty line, including 34.1% of those under age 18 and 18.0% of those age 65 or over.

=== 2000 census ===
At the 2000 census there were 1,186 people, 485 households, and 354 families living in the town. The population density was 161.9 inhabitants per square mile (62.5/km^{2}). There were 517 housing units at an average density of 70.6 per square mile (27.3/km^{2}). The racial makeup of the town was 96.37% White, 0.08% Black or African American, 1.18% Native American, 0.08% Asian, 0.51% from other races, and 1.77% from two or more races. 0.67% of the population were Hispanic or Latino of any race. Of the 485 households 34.0% had children under the age of 18 living with them, 59.2% were married couples living together, 10.5% had a householder who was a woman with no husband present, and 27.0% were non-families. 25.2% of households were one person and 11.8% were one person aged 65 or older. The average household size was 2.45 and the average family size was 2.89.

The age distribution was 24.3% under the age of 18, 9.8% from 18 to 24, 27.5% from 25 to 44, 25.3% from 45 to 64, and 13.2% 65 or older. The median age was 38 years. For every 100 women, there were 91.6 men. For every 100 women age 18 and over, there were 88.7 men.

The median household income was $28,553 and the median family income was $35,000. Men had a median income of $28,681 versus $19,620 for women. The per capita income for the town was $15,561. About 13.6% of families and 16.6% of the population were below the poverty line, including 19.9% of those under age 18 and 30.7% of those age 65 or over.

== Education ==
Sylvania High School, a member of the DeKalb County School System, was built in 1947 after the first school—built in 1914—burned down 2 years prior. Their mascot is “The Rams”, with gold and green as their school colors. The current Principal is Heath Kirby.
