= DeKalb County Schools (Alabama) =

School district in Alabama

Coordinates: 34°33′18″N 85°54′17″W

Location
- DeKalb County, Alabama United States

District information
- Type: Public
- Grades: K–12
- Superintendent: Wayne Lyles
- Schools: 14

Students and staff
- Students: 8,525 (2020–2021)
- Teachers: 530.4 (on FTE basis)
- Student–teacher ratio: 16.1:1

Other information
- Website: https://www.dekalbk12.org/

The DeKalb County School System serves the rural areas and communities of DeKalb County, Alabama, with the exception of the schools located within the county seat of Fort Payne, which has its own school system. The system serves approximately 8,500 students, and the administrative offices are located in Rainsville. The current superintendent is Wayne Lyles, serving since July 26, 2021.

== Facilities ==
The district operates 13 schools, seven of which are PreK–12 schools:

=== High schools ===
- Collinsville High School, Collinsville (PreK–12)
- Crossville High School, Crossville (9–12)
- Fyffe High School, Fyffe (PreK–12)
- Geraldine High School, Geraldine (PreK–12)
- Ider High School, Ider (PreK–12)
- Plainview High School, Rainsville (PreK–12)
- Sylvania High School, Sylvania (PreK–12)
- Valley Head High School, Valley Head (PreK–12)
- DeKalb County Technology Center, Rainsville (10–12)

=== Elementary/middle schools ===
- Crossville Middle School, Crossville (4–8)
- Crossville Elementary School, Crossville (PreK–3)
- Henagar Jr. High School, Henagar (PreK–8)
- Ruhama Jr. High School, Fort Payne (PreK–8)
