= Rainsville, Alabama =

City in Alabama, United States

Rainsville
- City
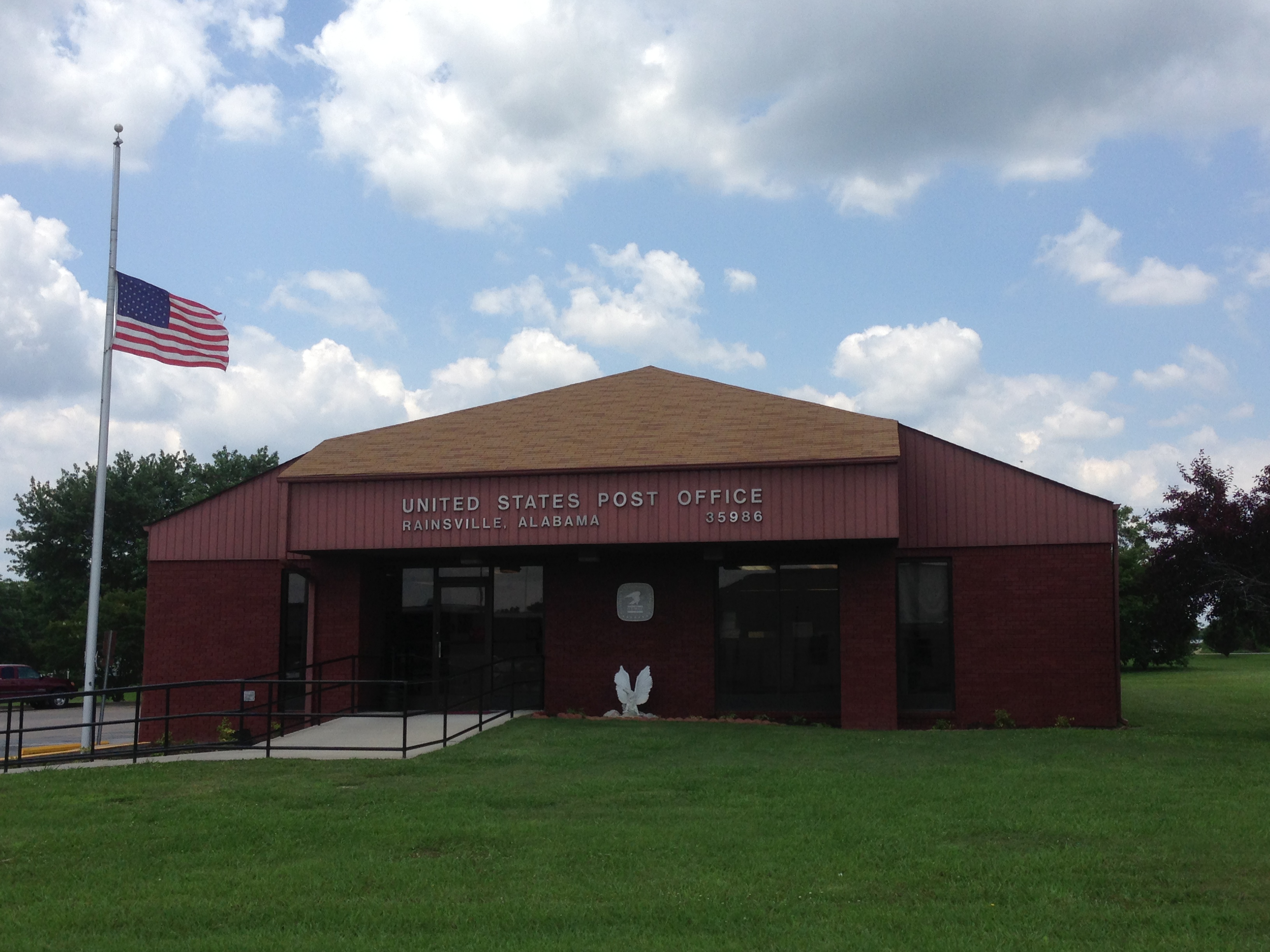
- Rainsville post office

- Location of Rainsville in DeKalb County, Alabama.
- Coordinates: 34°29′32″N 85°50′43″W
- Country: United States
- State: Alabama
- County: DeKalb

Area
  - Total: 20.71 sq mi (53.63 km^{2})
  - Land: 20.69 sq mi (53.59 km^{2})
  - Water: 0.015 sq mi (0.04 km^{2})
- Elevation: 1,296 ft (395 m)

Population (2020)
  - Total: 5,505
  - Density: 266.0/sq mi (102.72/km^{2})
- Time zone: UTC-6 (Central (CST))
  - Summer (DST): UTC-5 (CDT)
- ZIP code: 35986
- Area code: 256
- FIPS code: 01-63336
- GNIS feature ID: 2404589
- Website: www.rainsvillealabama.com

Rainsville is a city in DeKalb County, Alabama, United States. As of the 2020 census, Rainsville had a population of 5,505. Rainsville is located on top of Sand Mountain, a southern extension of the Cumberland Plateau.

== History ==
Rainsville was incorporated in October 1956.

An EF5 tornado struck the city on April 27, 2011, leaving 25 fatalities. It initially touched down 10 miles (16 km) to the southwest in Lakeview, causing structural damage to small buildings and snapping trees. It grew in intensity, and the path width increased from around fifty yards to a half a mile, as the rotation entered the Rainsville and Sylvania communities. Damage included houses that were completely removed from foundations and debris scattered for about one mile, trees debarked, and a few mobile homes were destroyed with debris strewn for about a mile downstream. In Sylvania, some of these houses removed from foundations contained anchor bolts and foundation straps.

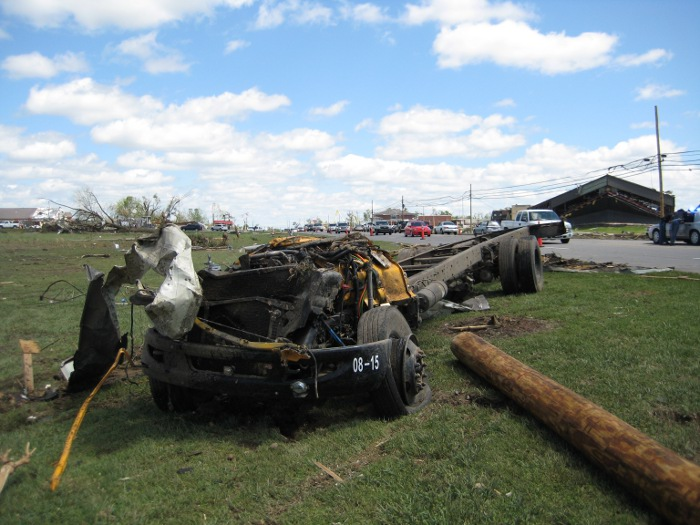
Damage from the Rainsville EF5 Tornado

== Geography ==
Rainsville is located northwest of the center of DeKalb County at 34°29′32″N 85°50′43″W (34.492258, -85.845316). It is bordered to the northeast by Sylvania, to the northwest by Powell, to the southwest by Shiloh, and to the southeast by Pine Ridge.

Alabama State Routes 35 and 75 intersect in the center of town. AL 35 leads northwest 19 miles (31 km) to Scottsboro and southeast 9 miles (14 km) to Fort Payne, the DeKalb County seat. AL 75 leads northeast 10 miles (16 km) to Henagar and southwest 26 miles (42 km) to Albertville.

According to the U.S. Census Bureau, Rainsville has a total area of 20.6 square miles (53.3 km^{2}), of which 0.02 square miles (0.04 km^{2}), or 0.07%, is water.

== Demographics ==
Historical population
Census	Pop.	Note	%±
1960	568		—
1970	2,099		269.5%
1980	3,907		86.1%
1990	3,875		−0.8%
2000	4,499		16.1%
2010	4,948		10.0%
2020	5,505		11.3%
U.S. Decennial Census; 2013 Estimate

Rainsville first appeared on the 1960 U.S. Census, having incorporated as a town in 1956. It was erroneously reported as having 398 residents. This was due to an error which failed to include additional residents within the town limits, it was afterwards adjusted to 568 residents.

=== 2020 census ===
As of the 2020 census, Rainsville had a population of 5,505. The median age was 41.3 years. 23.6% of residents were under the age of 18 and 20.0% of residents were 65 years of age or older. For every 100 females there were 92.8 males, and for every 100 females age 18 and over there were 88.6 males age 18 and over.

0.0% of residents lived in urban areas, while 100.0% lived in rural areas.

There were 2,267 households and 1,303 families in Rainsville, and 29.8% of households had children under the age of 18 living in them. Of all households, 51.2% were married-couple households, 16.3% were households with a male householder and no spouse or partner present, and 28.4% were households with a female householder and no spouse or partner present. About 30.1% of all households were made up of individuals and 16.2% had someone living alone who was 65 years of age or older.

There were 2,427 housing units, of which 6.6% were vacant. The homeowner vacancy rate was 2.5% and the rental vacancy rate was 4.5%.

Rainsville racial composition
Race	Num.	Perc.
White (non-Hispanic)	4,848	88.07%
Black or African American (non-Hispanic)	29	0.53%
Native American	91	1.65%
Asian	9	0.16%
Other/Mixed	269	4.89%
Hispanic or Latino	259	4.7%

=== 2010 census ===
As of the 2010 census Rainsville had a population of 4,984. The racial and ethnic composition of the population was 93.5% non-Hispanic white, 0.2% African American, 0.9% Native American, 0.2% Asian, 0.1% Pacific Islander, 2.1% from some other race, 1.3% from two or more races and 3.8% Hispanic or Latino of any race.

=== 2000 census ===
As of the census of 2000, there were 4,499 people, 1,880 households, and 1,336 families residing in the city. The population density was 226.5 inhabitants per square mile (87.5/km^{2}). There were 2,016 housing units at an average density of 101.5 per square mile (39.2/km^{2}). The racial makeup of the city was 97.11% White, 0.09% Black or African American, 0.44% Native American, 0.09% Asian, 0.09% Pacific Islander, 1.09% from other races, and 1.09% from two or more races. 2.18% of the population were Hispanic or Latino of any race.

There were 1,880 households, out of which 31.4% had children under the age of 18 living with them, 58.0% were married couples living together, 10.5% had a female householder with no husband present, and 28.9% were non-families. 26.9% of all households were made up of individuals, and 13.6% had someone living alone who was 65 years of age or older. The average household size was 2.39 and the average family size was 2.90.

In the city, the population was spread out, with 23.6% under the age of 18, 7.8% from 18 to 24, 28.1% from 25 to 44, 25.0% from 45 to 64, and 15.5% who were 65 years of age or older. The median age was 38 years. For every 100 females, there were 89.0 males. For every 100 females age 18 and over, there were 83.6 males.

The median income for a household in the city was $29,505, and the median income for a family was $37,426. Males had a median income of $31,776 versus $19,618 for females. The per capita income for the city was $14,806. About 11.9% of families and 14.4% of the population were below the poverty line, including 13.4% of those under age 18 and 18.3% of those age 65 or over.

== Education ==
Plainview High School, home of the Bears, and the DeKalb County School System offices are located in Rainsville. As of December 2023, Plainview High School will be classified as a 4A school for the 2024-2025 and 2025-2026 school years. The current Principal is Chris Clark.

Cornerstone Christian Academy is located in Rainsville. The current head administrator is Seth Stone.

DeKalb County Technology Center, DCTC, Secondary Career Technical Education. DCTC is considered one of the top career technical education centers in the Southeastern United States, winning the Southern Regional Education Board's Pacesetter Award for excellence in career tech education in 2018 and 2020. In 2021, DCTC was recognized by Alabama Governor Kay Ivey for Best Practices in Work-Based Learning for Region 1. DCTC is home to 75 SkillsUSA and HOSA State Championships.

== Notable people ==
- Lowell Barron, member of the Alabama Senate from 1982 to 2010
- Jeremy Pruitt, former head coach for the University of Tennessee football team
- Nathaniel Ledbetter, Speaker of the Alabama House of Representatives
