= Geraldine, Alabama =

- Town
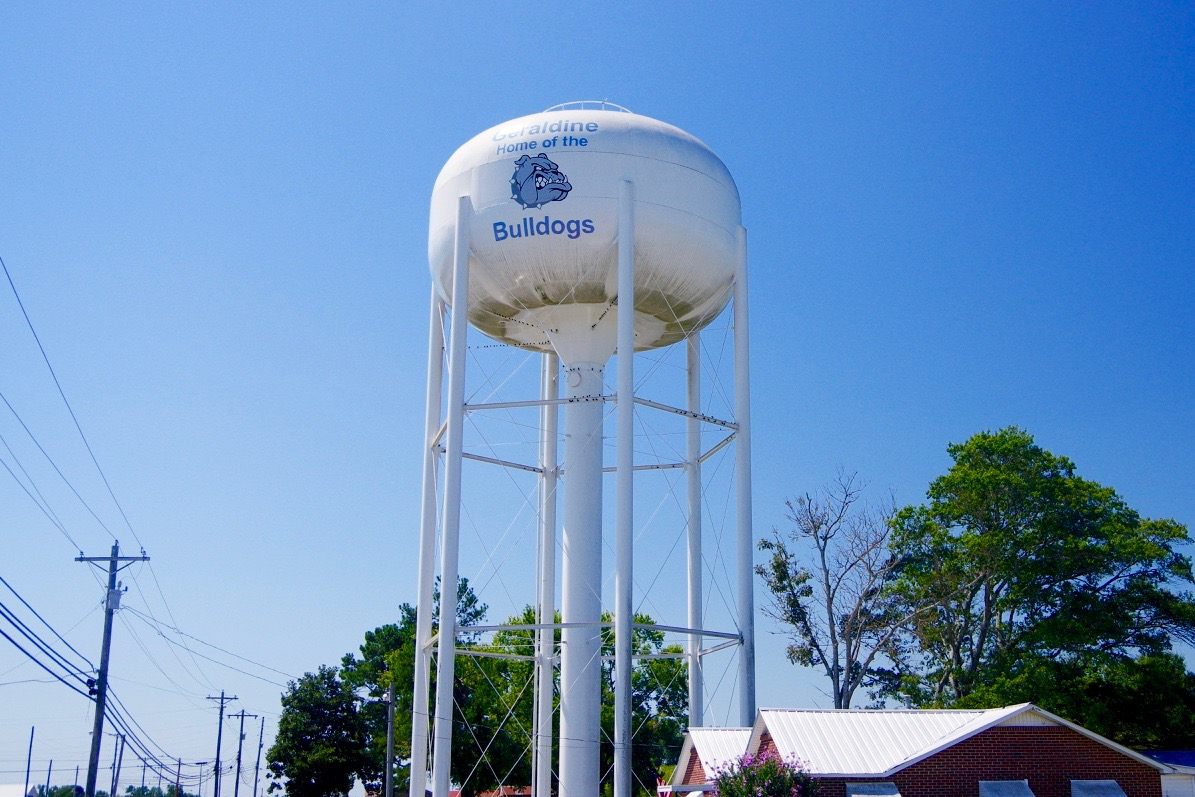
- Water tower in Geraldine

- Flag Seal

- Location of Geraldine in DeKalb County, Alabama.
- Coordinates: 34°21′13″N 86°0′14″W
- Country: United States
- State: Alabama
- County: DeKalb
- Established: February 1956

Government
  - Type: Mayor-Council
  - Mayor: John "Chuck" Ables

Area
  - Total: 3.83 sq mi (9.93 km^{2})
  - Land: 3.82 sq mi (9.90 km^{2})
  - Water: 0.012 sq mi (0.03 km^{2})
- Elevation: 1,145 ft (349 m)

Population (2020)
  - Total: 910
  - Density: 238.1/sq mi (91.92/km^{2})
- Time zone: UTC-6 (Central (CST))
  - Summer (DST): UTC-5 (CDT)
- ZIP code: 35974
- Area code: 256
- FIPS code: 01-29608
- GNIS feature ID: 2406561
- Website: www.townofgeraldineal.com

Geraldine is a town in DeKalb County, Alabama, United States. It was incorporated in February 1957. At the 2020 census, the population was 910.

== Geography ==
Geraldine is located at 34°21′13″N 86°0′14″W (34.353654, -86.004002). The town is located atop Sand Mountain, about halfway between Rainsville to the northeast and Albertville to the southwest. State Route 75 and State Route 227 intersect near the center of town. According to the U.S. Census Bureau, the town has a total area of 3.9 square miles (10 km^{2}), of which 3.9 square miles (10 km^{2}) is land and 0.26% is water.

== Mayor ==
The current mayor of Geraldine is John "Chuck" Ables. He is currently serving in his 3rd term as Mayor. .

Mayor	Years served
Raymond Upton	1956–1960
L.M. Bailey	1960–1964
C.C. Lowrey	1964–1976
Dave Turner	1976–1984, 1988–1992
T.A. Shellhorse	1984–1988
Roy Wilborn	1992–2000
Billy Smothers	2000–2012
John "Chuck" Ables	2012–Present

== Demographics ==
Historical population
Census	Pop.	Note	%±
1960	340		—
1970	610		79.4%
1980	911		49.3%
1990	801		−12.1%
2000	786		−1.9%
2010	896		14.0%
2020	910		1.6%
U.S. Decennial Census; 2013 Estimate

As of the 2010 census, Geraldine had a population of 896. The racial and ethnic composition of the population was 92.5% non-Hispanic white, 0.3% black or African American, 3.7% Native American, 0.7% from some other race, 1.8% from two or more races (1.6% of whom reported Native American as one of their races) and 2.0% Hispanic or Latino of any race.

As of the census of 2000, there were 786 people, 351 households, and 230 families residing in the town. The population density was 202.3 inhabitants per square mile (78.1/km^{2}). There were 394 housing units at an average density of 101.4 per square mile (39.2/km^{2}). The racial makeup of the town was 97.96% White, 1.15% Native American, and 0.89% from two or more races. 0.38% of the population were Hispanic or Latino of any race.

There were 351 households, out of which 24.8% had children under the age of 18 living with them, 52.4% were married couples living together, 10.3% had a female householder with no husband present, and 34.2% were non-families. 32.2% of all households were made up of individuals, and 20.5% had someone living alone who was 65 years of age or older. The average household size was 2.24 and the average family size was 2.81.

In the town, the population was spread out, with 21.2% under the age of 18, 8.0% from 18 to 24, 26.5% from 25 to 44, 22.9% from 45 to 64, and 21.4% who were 65 years of age or older. The median age was 41 years. For every 100 females, there were 78.6 males. For every 100 females age 18 and over, there were 78.4 males.

The median income for a household in the town was $24,028, and the median income for a family was $34,583. Males had a median income of $27,083 versus $20,179 for females. The per capita income for the town was $18,330. About 12.1% of families and 17.0% of the population were below the poverty line, including 17.4% of those under age 18 and 20.3% of those age 65 or over.

== Education ==
Geraldine School (PK-12), "home of the Bulldogs," is a member of the DeKalb County School System. As of December 2023, Geraldine is classified as a 3A high school.

== Notable people ==
- Damon Johnson, guitarist, vocalist and songwriter
- Andrew Pope, country music singer and songwriter
- Pat Upton, Spiral Starecase singer, guitarist and songwriter
