= Scott Strumlauf =

American business entrepreneur (born 1967)

Scott Strumlauf (born January 5, 1967) is an American business entrepreneur. In Atlanta, Georgia he is the founder and co-owner of Atlanta's longest-running night club, Tongue & Groove (Atlanta). Strumlauf has built, operated and sold numerous independent companies in the areas of finance, restaurant/bar hospitality and tanning salons.

== Personal life ==
Strumlauf was born in the Bronx, New York. In 1984, he moved to Atlanta, Georgia. He graduated pre-med in 1988 from Emory University, where he was a member of the Chi Phi fraternity, with a B.S. degree in biology. Strumlauf currently resides in the Buckhead area of Atlanta, Georgia. He became an instrumented rated private pilot in 2012.

== Career ==
At the age of 15, Strumlauf started a lawn care, car washing and firewood business throughout high school and college summer breaks. While attending Emory University in 1984 and preparing for a career as a doctor, Strumlauf worked as a part-time doorman at a local Atlanta nightclub called Scenario. After graduating from Emory University in 1988 at the age of 21, Strumlauf and college friend Marc Cooperman opened Boys and Girls in the summer of 1988, Atlanta's first 18 and over nightclub. With Cooperman, Plastic Nightclub opened in 1989. During that same year, Strumlauf and Cooperman also entered the magazine publishing business with the release of Eye Magazine, a fashion publication focusing on Atlanta's restaurant and nightlife scene.

Following a short move back to New York City in 1990 with a short-lived career as a commodity pit trader on the floor of the New York Mercantile Exchange at the Twin Towers, Strumlauf returned permanently back to Atlanta in 1991 to partner again with Cooperman and George Wagner to open a college bar called The Odyssey in the Buckhead Village, Atlanta's famous restaurant/bar district. In 1992, Strumlauf opened Malibu Beach Tanning. After expanding to four Atlanta-area locations, Palm Beach Tan purchased the company in 2006.

In early 1994, Strumlauf and Cooperman, along with operating partner Jim Sullivan, opened his first restaurant/bar, Metropolitan Pizza Bar, also located in the Buckhead Village. In late 1994, Strumlauf opened Atlanta nightclub, Tongue & Groove, with business partners, Michael Krohngold and Cooperman. A year later in 1995, Strumlauf, along with partners Michael Krohngold, Marc Cooperman, Dee Grimes and consulting chef Guenter Seeger, opened Mumbo Jumbo, a 200-seat modern American restaurant located in downtown Atlanta. In 1996, Atlanta Mayor Bill Campbell honored Mumbo Jumbo with a proclamation for serving as an economic catalyst to the revitalization of downtown Atlanta. In 2000, Strumlauf, Krohngold and Sullivan then opened Jack Rabbit Lounge in the Buckhead Village. In 2007, the original Tongue & Groove location was closed after a lease buyout by Ben Carter Properties. Krohngold and Strumlauf then formed a nightlife consulting company, Wildlife Resource Management, LLC before opening the new Tongue & Groove at Lindbergh City Center in 2008 with new operating partner, David Kreidler.

A year later in 2009, Strumlauf and Steven M. Winter launched a subprime auto financing company, Georgia Title Lenders, LLC. In 2012, Strumlauf and Winter formed WS Funding, LLC, a collateral-based finance company. In 2014, Strumlauf and partner Krohngold were honored by the Atlanta Community Food Bank as one of Atlanta's premier hospitality duos.
