= 2008 Prattville–Millbrook tornado =

2008 tornado in Alabama, U.S.

- The tornado, seen by a security camera in Prattville

Meteorological history
- Formed: February 17, 2008, 2:58 p.m. CDT (UTC−05:00)
- Dissipated: February 17, 2008, 3:19 p.m. CDT (UTC−05:00)
- Duration: 21 minutes

EF3 tornado
- on the Enhanced Fujita scale
- Highest winds: 155 mph (249 km/h)

Overall effects
- Fatalities: 0
- Injuries: 50
- Damage: $1.7–1.8 million (2009 USD)
- Part of the Tornadoes of 2008

In the afternoon hours of February 17, 2008, a large and intense tornado moved through Prattville and Millbrook, cities located in the U.S. state of Alabama. The tornado, which was rated EF3 on the Enhanced Fujita scale, injured 50 people along a 14.5-mile (23.3 km) path while on the ground for a total of 21 minutes. The tornado reached a maximum width of 440 yards (400 m).

The tornado touched down at 2:58 p.m. (Note: For consistency, all times in the article are in Central Daylight Time.) to the southwest of Prattville, rapidly strengthening as it moved into the city. Significant damage was inflicted in Prattville, where 200 residences suffered damage. A strip mall and multiple neighborhoods were heavily impacted, with cars being thrown and structures being de-roofed. Despite severe damage in city limits, no fatalities were reported. Continuing into Elmore County and near Millbrook, the tornado produced relatively minor structural damage before lifting at 3:19 p.m. It was the strongest to ever impact the Prattville area, and one of the strongest in the Montgomery metropolitan area.

== Advanced forecasting ==
The first indications of a severe weather threat were outlined by the Storm Prediction Center (SPC) in their Day 5 convective outlook published on February 13. A large 30% risk area was denoted for a large portion of the southeastern United States. The Day 4 outlook retained the 30% risk area while expanding it eastward into the Carolinas.

The Day 3 convective outlook, outlined on February 15, introduced a large slight risk area for much of the Southeast, including Central Alabama. It was noted that "storms may intensify during the day as they advance EWD with large hodographs and strong deep shear supportive of bows and supercells". The Day 2 convective outlook maintained a slight risk area for the same areas as the day before. The risk was accompanied by a 30% chance of significant severe weather.

The Day 1 convective outlook, outlined at 7:00 a.m., featured a 10% "hatched" (Note: In meteorology, "hatching" indicated areas where significant severe weather (EF2+ tornadoes, 2"+ hail, 75+ mph winds) were possible. The traditional hatching pattern was updated by the Storm Prediction Center in 2026.) risk for tornadoes including much of Central and Southern Alabama. The SPC noted that "forecast soundings ahead of the squall-line this afternoon show impressive low-level shear profiles with about 50 kt at 850 mb and resultant 0–1 km shear values around 30 kt. this should be favorable for tornadoes with supercells ahead of the line and persistent rotating storms embedded in the line. If supercells initiate east of the squall-line...then an isolated strong tornado or two may occur across [Southern and Central] AL". Later updates to the Day 1 outlook removed the 10% risk region.

== Tornado summary ==
The tornado first touched down at 2:58 p.m. near a waste treatment facility to the southwest of Prattville, tracking to the northeast as it moved over U.S. Route 82. Along Cobbs Ford Road, significant damage was inflicted on structures, where the highest winds occurred. Further damage occurred on Tara Street and Thames Drive, where multiple residences were damaged or destroyed, including some that were swept to their foundations. On Seasons Drive the top portion of a residence was destroyed; the tornado continued moving northeast through this area. On Harvest Loop, the roof of a home caved inward and a 60-pound (27 kg) gas grill was tossed across the yard.

As the tornado approached the Premier Place Shopping Center, a person inside described that "there was a lot of rumbling ... I did a lot of praying". In the area, a Kmart was damaged, in addition to Fire Station 3. A truck in the Walmart parking lot was set aloft by the storm, landing upside-down 200 yards (180 m) from where it was initially parked. Inside the Walmart itself, light fixtures were ripped from the ceiling as the tornado passed over. Footage of the tornado in the area was captured by a security camera mounted to a steakhouse.

At the intersection of Cobbs Ford Road and McQueen Smith Road, 60-foot (18 m) metal-constructed power poles were bent downward, and transformers were lofted from their initial location. As the tornado moved over East Main Street, a dumpster impacted the backside of a Palm Beach Tan store, inflicting significant structural damage. Employees in the store hid in a room 2 feet (0.61 m) from where the dumpster landed. The Ding How Chinese Buffet, located on the corner of East Main Street and Sheila Boulevard, was significantly damaged and as a result remained closed until January 2011. Prattville Christian Academy suffered broken windows, while the school's gymnasium was completely destroyed. In the Silver Hills subdivision the tornado was again captured on camera moving northeast.

It then entered Elmore County, causing minor structural damage as it moved over Interstate 65 and Alabama State Route 14. It shifted north near Millbrook, snapping trees before lifting at 3:19 p.m. near the Speigner Lake area in Elmore County. It was on the ground for 21 minutes, traveling 14.5 miles (23.3 km) during that time, and was additionally the strongest to ever impact the Prattville area. The tornado occurred just 12 days after another significant tornado outbreak affected Alabama, and was one of multiple tornadoes to move through Southeast Alabama on February 17.

== Aftermath ==
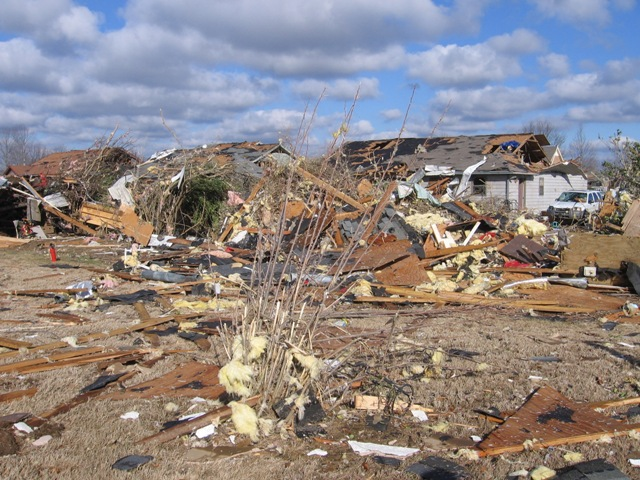
Damage to a subdivision following the tornado

=== Damage and recovery ===
At 4:30 p.m. on February 17, Prattville mayor Jim Byard ordered that a dusk-to-dawn curfew be implemented in areas where the tornado moved through the city. At around the same time, emergency crews from nearby communities descended on Prattville to aid in initial recovery efforts. A short time later, over 100 Alabama state troopers arrived in the city, accompanied by other federal law enforcement officials. At 7:00 p.m. the same day, both the Prattville City Council and the Autauga County Commission passed declarations aiding recovery efforts during meetings lasting less than 15 minutes in total; shelters were established at the First United Methodist Church and the Doster Community Center that night. 11,000 structures were left without power the night following the storm, as reported by Alabama Power.

The following day, on February 18, the search for victims was called off and cleanup efforts began. During the day, the National Weather Service office in Birmingham determined that the tornado produced EF3-level damage on the Enhanced Fujita scale, with peak estimated wind speeds of 155 miles per hour (249 km/h). The dusk-to-dawn curfew was lifted on February 19, although checkpoints into damaged areas remained in place. Damage costs totaled an estimated $1.7–1.8 million (2009 USD), stemming from damage to city-owned property and lost revenue from businesses. 200 homes and 40 more businesses were affected by the tornado.

An anniversary dinner for the event was held in February 2009 at the Daniel Pratt Elementary School.

=== Casualties ===
A total of 50 people were reported as having been injured during the event, including 2–4 critically. No fatalities were reported as a result of the tornado. A 35-bed mobile hospital was set up outside the damaged Kmart in Prattville to treat the injured.

== See also ==
- Tornadoes in Alabama
- 1984 Montgomery tornado, another strong tornado in the Montgomery metropolitan area
