= Tornadoes in Alabama =

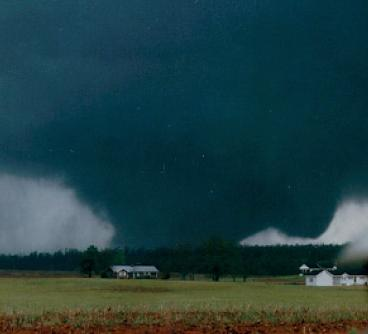
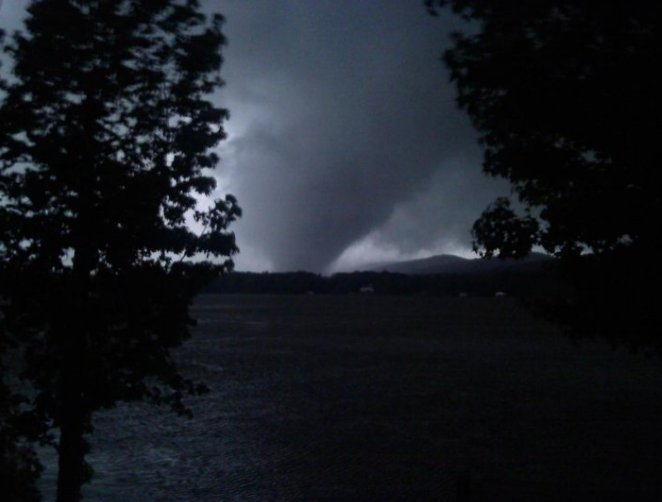
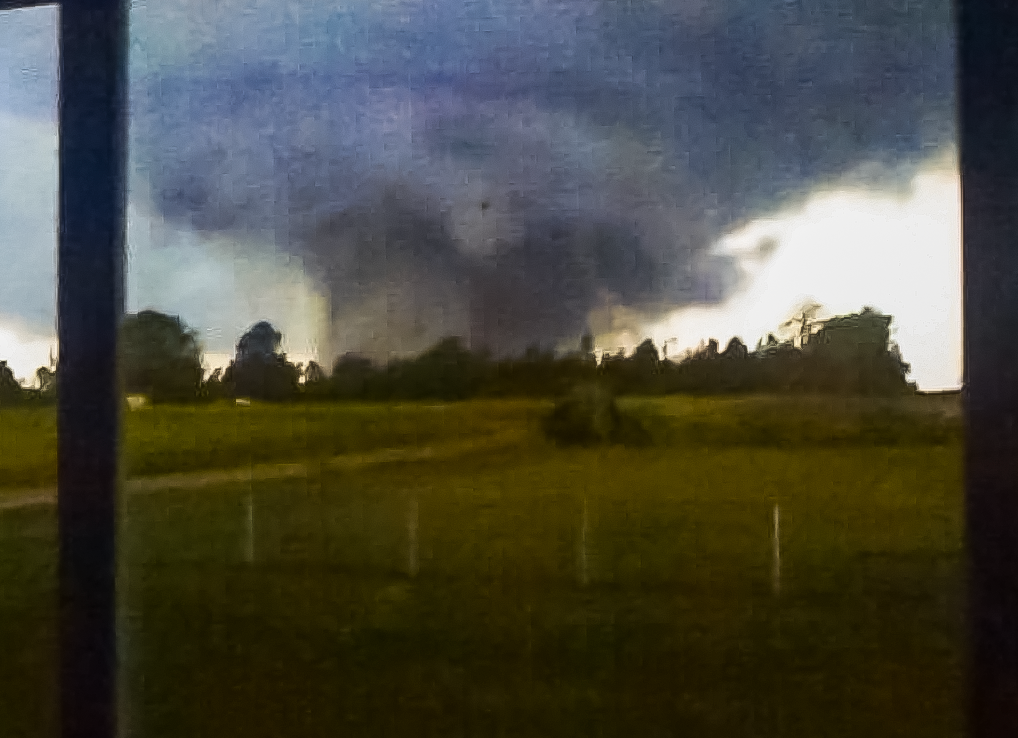
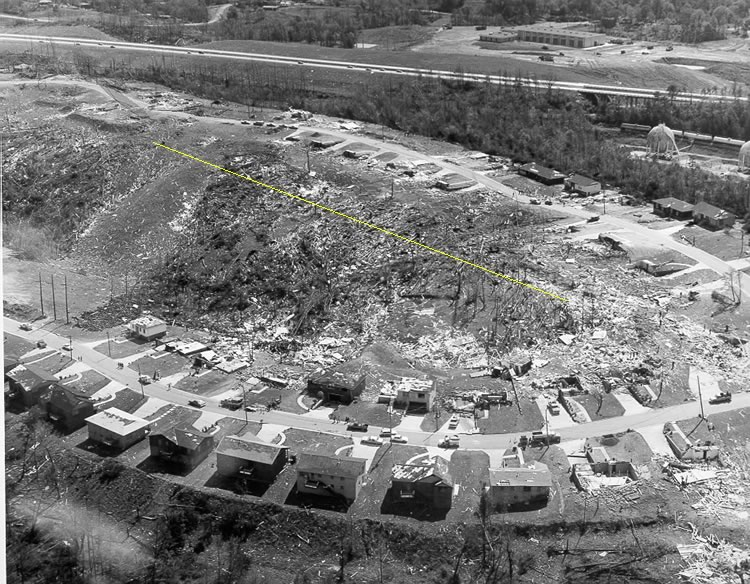
- Clockwise from top: An F4 tornado near Piedmont during the 1994 Palm Sunday tornado outbreak; a destructive EF4 tornado in the Ohatchee area; an EF5 tornado after heavily damaging Rainsville; radar progression of a violent and deadly EF4 tornado that traveled over 60 miles through areas in Alabama; heavy damage from a 1977 F5 tornado in the suburbs of Birmingham
- Tornadoes statewide: 2,848 (1925–2025)
- Fatalities: >1,867 (1794–2025)
- Deadliest single tornado: 71 deaths Hackleburg, Alabama, Phil Campbell, Alabama EF5 tornado on April 27, 2011
- Most active year: 2011 (146 tornadoes)

The U.S. state of Alabama has seen numerous destructive and devastating tornadoes since 1819, the year with the first recorded tornado within state boundaries. Alabama, located in the "Dixie Alley" region of the Southern United States, experiences an average of 64 tornadoes annually. 297 tornadoes have been classified as "intense" in Alabama, being rated F3+ on the Fujita scale (Note: Official ratings were assigned after 1950. Prior to that, ratings are assigned by tornado historian Thomas P. Grazulis.) or EF3+ on the Enhanced Fujita scale. Alabama has seen nine F5 or EF5 tornadoes since 1966, the most recent hitting Rainsville in April 2011. The deadliest moved across North Alabama, hitting numerous communities and killing 71 people.

Alabama saw numerous significant tornadoes prior to 1950, including an F4 tornado that killed 30 people in Calhoun and Cherokee counties. 1932 saw a devastating tornado outbreak that killed over 200 people in the state of Alabama; an F4-rated tornado impacted the cities of Tuscaloosa and Northport. 26 people were killed in 1935 when a strong tornado moved through the city of Montgomery. The 1950s saw several large and destructive tornadoes impact communities. The widest of the decade, rated F3, reached a maximum width of 1480 yd (1350 m) as it moved across Russell County. In 1954, a violent tornado took the lives of 25 people in the northern suburbs of Birmingham; another tornado just eight days earlier killed five people in Falkville.

Tornadoes in the 1960s were equally-as-destructive, with a total of 157 tornadoes touching down within state boundaries, killing 81 people. An extremely long-tracked F5 tornado that originated in Mississippi moved into Alabama on March 3, 1966; Tuscaloosa and other communities were affected. Earlier in the decade an F4 tornado killed 10 people and injured six others southeast of Harpersville.

The 1970s were a deadly decade for tornadoes in Alabama, with the "Super Outbreak" occurring in 1974. Alabama was affected by three F5 tornadoes that day, with at least 78 people dying in the state. The town of Tanner saw two destructive F5 tornadoes that each killed over 15 people. Later in the decade saw an F5 tornado impact the suburbs of Birmingham, Alabama, killing 22. Only 36 people were killed by tornadoes through the 1980s, most of which were from a destructive tornado that moved through areas near Huntsville in November 1989.

The 1990s were a relatively significant decade for tornadoes in Alabama. On March 27, 1994, an F4 tornado killed 22 people in the Piedmont area; an F3 tornado near Fyffe on the same day injured 20 others. Six people were killed when a tornado moved south of Arab on February 15, 1995. The end of the decade saw an F5 tornado devastate portions of northern Birmingham, killing 32 and injuring over 200 others.

The 2000s were quiet in terms of tornado activity in Alabama, with the deadliest tornado killing 11 people on December 16, 2000. Several F4 tornadoes hit the state during this period, including one that moved through the city of Enterprise. The 2010s saw the most destructive tornado outbreak in recorded history on April 27, 2011; Alabama was impacted by 62 tornadoes. Several violent tornadoes affected communities across the state like Cordova, Tuscaloosa, Birmingham, Hackleburg, Phil Campbell, Oak Grove, Plainview, Cullman, Fackler, Flat Rock, Eoline and other communities in North and Central Alabama. The outbreak killed an estimated 247 persons in Alabama alone, making it the second-deadliest tornado outbreak in the state's history. Both the deadliest and widest tornadoes in Alabama history occurred on this day.

== Alabama tornado climatology ==
Alabama is located in a region known informally as "Dixie Alley", a term used for areas of the southern United States which are particularly vulnerable to strong to violent tornadoes. Dixie Alley is part of a region of enhanced tornadic activity extending between the Appalachian and Rocky Mountains, but tornadoes and outbreaks in the Dixie Alley region exhibit some statistically distinguishable characteristics from the more well known Tornado Alley. Tornadic storms in Dixie Alley are most often high precipitation supercells due to an increase of moisture from proximity to the nearby Gulf of Mexico. The Dixie Alley tornadoes accompanying the HP supercells are often partially or fully wrapped in rain, impairing the visibility of the tornadoes to storm spotters and chasers, law enforcement, and the public. Increases of warmth and instability in conjunction with strong wind shear in the Dixie Alley region impacts the times when tornadoes form. In the traditional Tornado Alley, tornadoes most often form from the mid afternoon to early evening.

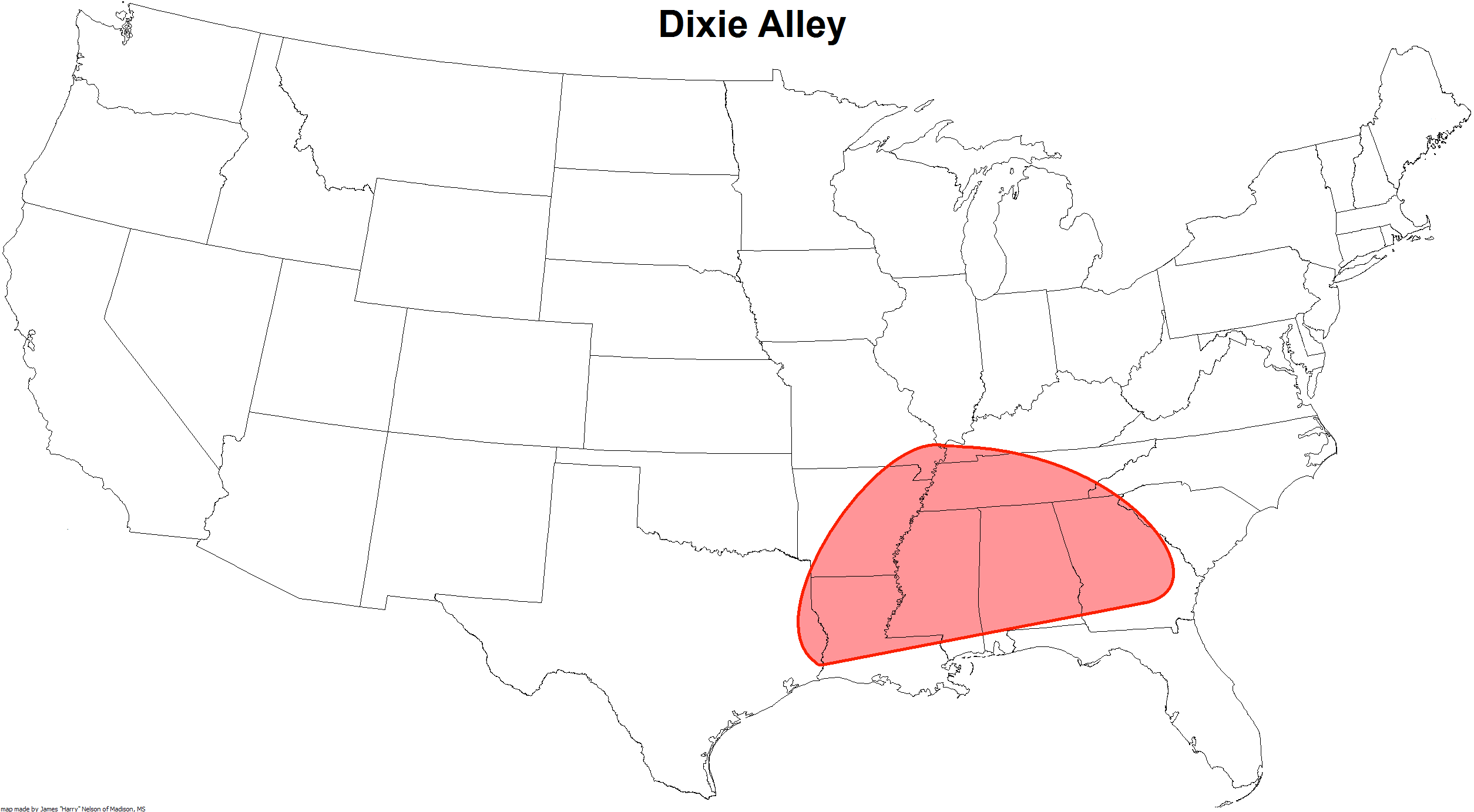
The vast majority of Alabama is located in Dixie Alley (highlighted in red).

Dixie Alley's instability can be maintained long after sunset due to being adjacent to the Gulf, increasing the frequency of intense nighttime and early morning tornadoes. There is also a less focused tornado season which tends to be most active in early spring and late autumn but can continue throughout the winter and into late spring, which can lead to complacency among residents of the region. The region often is subject to tornadoes much earlier than the general national peak from May and June, usually from February to Mid-April, and several notorious outbreaks have struck during the late winter and early spring and also in late fall.

Although tornadoes are less frequent in these states than they are in the southern Plains, the southeastern states have had more tornado-related deaths than any of the Plains states (excluding Texas). This is partly due to the fact that there are relatively high numbers of strong/violent long tracked tornadoes and higher population density of this region, as well as the Southern United States having the highest percentage of manufactured homes in the US, where 63% of the overall tornado-related fatalities occur. According to the National Climatic Data Center (NCDC), for the period January 1, 1950 – October 31, 2006, Alabama and Kansas received the largest number of F5 tornadoes. Complicating matters is that tornadoes are rarely visible in this area, as they are more likely to be rain-wrapped, embedded in shafts of heavy rain, and that the hilly topography and heavily forested landscape makes them difficult to see.

== Intense tornadoes ==
=== Pre–1925 ===
‡ Tornado crossed state lines in or out of Alabama

F#	Date	Deaths	Injuries	Location	Counties	Path length	Max width
F4	November 22, 1874	14	30	SW to E of Muscle Shoals	Franklin	19.2 mi (30.9 km)	Unknown
F3	November 22, 1874	2	20	Montevallo	Shelby	10.2 mi (16.4 km)	800 yd (730 m)
F3	February 14, 1875	3	15	NW of Reform	Pickens	Unknown	150 yd (140 m)
F4	March 20, 1875	7	20	N of Opelika to SE of Valley	Lee, Chambers	23.5 mi (37.8 km)‡	300 yd (270 m)
F4	May 1, 1875	15	50	E of Rockford to LaFayette	Coosa, Tallapoosa, Chamber	79.6 mi (128.1 km)‡	400 yd (370 m)
F3	May 1, 1875	22	30	N of Loachapoka	Lee	70.2 mi (113.0 km)‡	300 yd (270 m)
F3	March 27, 1882	2	8	SW to E of Georgiana	Butler	12.1 mi (19.5 km)	200 yd (180 m)
F3	March 27, 1882	2	8	W to N of Loachapoka	Lee	5.2 mi (8.4 km)	800 yd (730 m)
F3	March 27, 1882	1	10	SE of Clayton	Barbour	6.9 mi (11.1 km)	600 yd (550 m)
F4	February 19, 1884	13	30	N of Hoover to Leeds to E of Moody	Jefferson, St. Clair	29.7 mi (47.8 km)	400 yd (370 m)
F4	February 19, 1884	30	100	N of Jacksonville to NW of Piedmont	Calhoun, Cherokee	35.4 mi (57.0 km)‡	400 yd (370 m)
F3	April 1, 1884	3	10	E of Ider	DeKalb	18.3 mi (29.5 km)‡	Unknown
F3	January 11, 1885	1	25	W of Vernon to W of Carbon Hill	Lamar, Fayette, Walker	38.4 mi (61.8 km)	600 yd (550 m)
F4	January 11, 1885	2	20	SW of Eutaw to Brent to S of Calera	Greene, Hale, Bibb, Chilton	80.3 mi (129.2 km)	400 yd (370 m)
F3	January 11, 1885	2	20	S of Sylacauga to E of Wedowee	Coosa, Clay, Randolph	58.1 mi (93.5 km)	600 yd (550 m)
F4	November 6, 1885	13	400	SW to N of Selma	Dallas	30 mi (48 km)	800 yd (730 m)
F3	March 3, 1893	4	15	S of Cuba	Sumter	25.7 mi (41.4 km)	300 yd (270 m)
F3	March 13, 1895	0	2	E of Louisville to NE of Clayton	Barbour	14.8 mi (23.8 km)	400 yd (370 m)
F4	March 18, 1899	12	30	E of Anniston to S of Fruithurst	Calhoun, Cleburne	17 mi (27 km)	400 yd (370 m)
F3	November 20, 1900	0	11	E of Hamilton	Marion	Unknown	200 yd (180 m)
F3	March 25, 1901	17	100	Birmingham	Jefferson	15 mi (24 km)	50 yd (46 m)
F4	April 7, 1903	19	100	Holly Pond	Cullman, Blount	20.1 mi (32.3 km)	100 yd (91 m)
F4	January 21, 1904	36	150	Moundville to SE of Tuscaloosa	Hale, Tuscaloosa	15.1 mi (24.3 km)	300 yd (270 m)
F3	March 20, 1905	9	30	SW to E of Roanoke	Chambers, Randolph	17.5 mi (28.2 km)	150 yd (140 m)
F3	January 3, 1906	2	20	NE of Banks	Pike	Unknown	200 yd (180 m)
F3	April 5, 1907	3	15	N of Luverne	Crenshaw	7 mi (11 km)	Unknown
F4	April 24, 1908	35	188	Dora to Warrior to Nectar to Cleveland to Albertville to Powell	Walker, Jefferson, Blount, Marshall	104.8 mi (168.7 km)	500 yd (460 m)
F4	April 24, 1908	11	50	NE of Piedmont	Cherokee	15.6 mi (25.1 km)	400 yd (370 m)
F3	April 29, 1908	0	10	S to E of Brundidge	Coffee, Pike	14.6 mi (23.5 km)	Unknown
F3	February 5, 1909	3	25	E of Dodge City to SW of Blountsville	Cullman, Blount	8.9 mi (14.3 km)	200 yd (180 m)
F3	February 23, 1909	1	1	S of Tuscumbia	Colbert	Unknown	100 yd (91 m)
F4	April 29, 1909	29 (Note: The majority of fatalities and injuries occurred in Giles County, Tennessee.)	70	W of Ardmore	Limestone	20.6 mi (33.2 km)	800 yd (730 m)
F3	March 26, 1911	3	50	Frisco City	Clarke, Monroe	21.9 mi (35.2 km)	200 yd (180 m)
F3	March 14, 1912	8	50	W of Hartford to Headland	Geneva, Dale, Henry	30.2 mi (48.6 km)	Unknown
F3	March 13, 1913	4	10	NE of Ohatchee to E of Hokes Bluff	Calhoun, Etowah	14.8 mi (23.8 km)	100 yd (91 m)
F3	March 13, 1913	4	25	Hokes Bluff	Etowah	6.8 mi (10.9 km)	Unknown
F4	March 20, 1913	27	60	NE of Grove Hill to S of Yellow Bluff	Clarke, Wilcox	13.5 mi (21.7 km)	400 yd (370 m)
F3	February 23, 1917	6	15	S to NE of Greensboro	Hale, Perry	17.5 mi (28.2 km)	Unknown
F3	February 23, 1917	9	50	Stewartville to Midway	Coosa, Bullock	14.7 mi (23.7 km)	600 yd (550 m)
F3	March 26, 1917	9	50	NW to NE of Troy	Crenshaw, Pike	24.5 mi (39.4 km)	500 yd (460 m)
F3	May 27, 1917	9	100	Carbon Hill to N of Jasper	Walker	17.4 mi (28.0 km)	800 yd (730 m)
F3	May 27, 1917	5	10	Windham Springs	Tuscaloosa	4.9 mi (7.9 km)	500 yd (460 m)
F4	May 27, 1917	27	100	E of Dora to Morris to W of Springville	Jefferson, Blount	24.7 mi (39.8 km)	800 yd (730 m)
F3	May 27, 1917	6	35	New Hope to E of Woodville	Cullman, Marshall, Jackson	18.1 mi (29.1 km)	200 yd (180 m)
F3	January 11, 1918	10	120	S of Dothan to Webb	Houston	13 mi (21 km)	200 yd (180 m)
F4	March 28, 1920	26	125	Lake Martin Reservoir to E of LaFayette	Elmore, Tallapoosa, Chambers	50 mi (80 km)‡	400 yd (370 m)
F3	March 28, 1920	1	10	SW of Piedmont	Calhoun	8.5 mi (13.7 km)	100 yd (91 m)
F4	April 20, 1920	88 (Note: While the tornado is the deadliest to move through any part of Alabama, around 35 of the deaths occurred in Mississippi and as such it is not considered the deadliest in state history.)	700	W of Hamilton to W of Hackleburg to W of Phil Campbell to Town Creek	Marion, Franklin, Colbert, Lawrence	129.8 mi (208.9 km)‡	800 yd (730 m)
F4	April 20, 1920	21	50	Carbon Hill to Arley to West Point	Fayette, Walker, Winston, Cullman, Morgan	50.7 mi (81.6 km)	400 yd (370 m)
F4	April 20, 1920	27	100	S to NE of Huntsville	Madison	20.3 mi (32.7 km)	400 yd (370 m)
F3	April 15, 1921	5	50	N of Russellville to Littleville to NW of Leighton	Franklin, Colbert	17.4 mi (28.0 km)	Unknown
F3	February 4, 1924	3	5	NE of Hoover	Jefferson	0.9 mi (1.4 km)	500 yd (460 m)
F3	April 29, 1924	1	10	Greenville	Butler	Unknown	100 yd (91 m)
F3	April 29, 1924	6	20	W to NE of Union Springs	Bullock, Macon	23.1 mi (37.2 km)	250 yd (230 m)
F3	May 26, 1924	11	7	NE of Sipsey	Walker	2.9 mi (4.7 km)	400 yd (370 m)
F3	May 26, 1924	8	0	E of Elkmont	Limestone	Unknown	Unknown
F3	May 27, 1924	3	20	W of Hamilton	Marion	29.8 mi (48.0 km)	Unknown
F3	December 7, 1924	0	0	S to E of Childersburg	Talladega	4 mi (6.4 km)	50 yd (46 m)

=== 1925–1949 ===
‡ Tornado crossed state lines in or out of Alabama

Intense (F3+) tornadoes in Alabama, 1925–1949
F#	Date	Deaths	Injuries	Location	Counties	Path length	Max width
F4	October 24, 1925	18	60	N of Levurne to N of Eufaula	Crenshaw, Pike, Bullock, Barbour	65.2 mi (104.9 km)	300 yd (270 m)
F3	November 25, 1926	4	15	SW to NE of Marion	Fayette, Marion	6.7 mi (10.8 km)	400 yd (370 m)
F3	March 22, 1929	5	25	Jacksonville	Calhoun	8.4 mi (13.5 km)	100 yd (91 m)
F3	January 12, 1932	9	29	Moundville	Hale, Tuscaloosa	8 mi (13 km)	400 yd (370 m)
F3	February 21, 1932	0	5	E of Dothan	Houston	4.9 mi (7.9 km)	400 yd (370 m)
F3	March 21, 1932	3	9	Demopolis	Marengo, Hale	7 mi (11 km)	125 yd (114 m)
F4	March 21, 1932	37	200	E of Ralph to Tuscaloosa to Northport	Tuscaloosa	20 mi (32 km)	400 yd (370 m)
F3	March 21, 1932	10	30	W of Uniontown to E of Newbern	Marengo, Hale, Perry	20 mi (32 km)	100 yd (91 m)
F4	March 21, 1932	31	200	S of Newbern to S of Marion S of Maplesville to N of Clanton	Hale, Perry, Dallas, Chilton, Coosa	75.3 mi (121.2 km)	800 yd (730 m)
F4	March 21, 1932	49	150	E of Newbern to N of Marion to N of Maplesville to Jemison	Perry, Chilton, Bibb, Coosa	60 mi (97 km)	800 yd (730 m)
F3	March 21, 1932	8	25	N of Addison to SW of Falkville	Winston, Cullman, Morgan	15.9 mi (25.6 km)	200 yd (180 m)
F4	March 21, 1932	18	100	S of Cullman to Fairview to E of Arab	Cullman, Morgan, Marshall	29.6 mi (47.6 km)	600 yd (550 m)
F4	March 21, 1932	14	75	Columbiana to E of Wilsonville	Shelby, Talladega	14.9 mi (24.0 km)	200 yd (180 m)
F4	March 21, 1932	38	500	Owens Cross Roads to Paint Rock to NW of Bridgeport	Morgan, Madison, Jackson	73.3 mi (118.0 km)‡	400 yd (370 m)
F4	March 21, 1932	41	325	Sylacauga to E of Waldo	Talladega, Clay	25.1 mi (40.4 km)	400 yd (370 m)
F4	March 21, 1932	13	160	NE of Sylacauga to Lineville to N of Woodland	Talladega, Clay, Randolph	47.5 mi (76.4 km)	400 yd (370 m)
F3	March 27, 1932	5	20	NW of Maplesville to NE of Clanton	Bibb, Chilton, Coosa	30.1 mi (48.4 km)	150 yd (140 m)
F3	May 4, 1933	4	27	Demopolis area	Choctaw, Sumter, Marengo, Greene, Hale	34.7 mi (55.8 km)	400 yd (370 m)
F4	May 4, 1933	21	200	S of Brent to N of Alabaster	Bibb, Shelby	35 mi (56 km)	
F4	February 25, 1934	4	40	SW to SE of Ashland	Clay	15.3 mi (24.6 km)	400 yd (370 m)
F3	January 17, 1936	4	8	SW of Rainsville	DeKalb	10.6 mi (17.1 km)	100 yd (91 m)
F3	April 5, 1936	8	55	N of Red Bay to W of Littleville	Franklin, Colbert	24.8 mi (39.9 km)‡	Unknown
F3	April 5, 1936	5	13	E of Rogersville to N of Hazel Green	Lauderdale, Limestone, Madison	50 mi (80 km)‡	200 yd (180 m)
F3	December 6, 1936	0	25	N of Northport	Tuscaloosa	14.9 mi (24.0 km)	100 yd (91 m)
F3	April 7, 1938	9	51	S of Aliceville to SW of Gordo	Pickens	20.2 mi (32.5 km)	200 yd (180 m)
F3	April 16, 1939	1	2	Boligee	Greene	1.8 mi (2.9 km)	200 yd (180 m)
F3	January 13, 1940	3	10	E of Montgomery	Montgomery	3.6 mi (5.8 km)	100 yd (91 m)
F3	January 1, 1942	0	0	SW to N of McIntosh	Washington	15.3 mi (24.6 km)	Unknown
F3	March 16, 1942	2	30	Waterloo	Lauderdale	1.8 mi (2.9 km)	400 yd (370 m)
F4	April 11, 1943	4	60	Hackleburg to Bear Creek	Marion, Franklin	5.1 mi (8.2 km)	200 yd (180 m)
F3	April 11, 1943	2	14	N of Cullman	Cullman	9.7 mi (15.6 km)	200 yd (180 m)
F3	March 6, 1944	1	12	Luverne to SW of Troy	Crenshaw, Pike	18.2 mi (29.3 km)	100 yd (91 m)
F3	April 11, 1944	2	20	S of Childersburg to SW of Talladega	Talladega	19.3 mi (31.1 km)	400 yd (370 m)
F4	February 12, 1945	11	63	York to Livingston	Sumter	17.9 mi (28.8 km)	400 yd (370 m)
F3	February 12, 1945	1	8	S of Maplesville	Chilton	1.8 mi (2.9 km)	100 yd (91 m)
F3	February 12, 1945	26	293	Montgomery	Montgomery	12.5 mi (20.1 km)	100 yd (91 m)
F3	February 12, 1945	0	2	Tuskegee	Macon	0.9 mi (1.4 km)	120 yd (110 m)
F3	January 30, 1947	3	30	W to N of Georgiana	Conecuh, Butler	14.6 mi (23.5 km)	200 yd (180 m)
F3	January 30, 1947	3	30	SE of Eclectic	Elmore	5.4 mi (8.7 km)	200 yd (180 m)
F3	March 26, 1948	3	40	Aliceville	Pickens	4.5 mi (7.2 km)	100 yd (91 m)
F4	November 24, 1949	4	44	SW of Nectar to NE of Oneonta	Blount	15.2 mi (24.5 km)	100 yd (91 m)

=== 1950–1974 ===
‡ Tornado crossed state lines in or out of Alabama

Intense (F3+) tornadoes in Alabama, 1950–1974
F#	Date	Deaths	Injuries	Location	Counties	Path length	Max width
F3	April 17, 1950	0	15	W to N of Mobile	Mobile	14 mi (23 km)	100 yd (91 m)
F3	February 13, 1952	1	14	S of Berry	Tuscaloosa, Fayette	5.6 mi (9.0 km)	100 yd (91 m)
F3	February 29, 1952	0	12	SW of Hammondville	DeKalb	3.3 mi (5.3 km)	400 yd (370 m)
F3	March 3, 1952	0	6	N of Gordo	Pickens	3.3 mi (5.3 km)	440 yd (400 m)
F4	March 22, 1952	4	50	Decatur to S of Huntsville	Morgan, Limestone, Madison	21.6 mi (34.8 km)	100 yd (91 m)
F3	January 20, 1953	0	0	SE of Jasper	Walker	1.5 mi (2.4 km)	50 yd (46 m)
F3	January 22, 1953	0	1	NE of Jackson	Washington, Clarke	6.5 mi (10.5 km)	300 yd (270 m)
F3	February 20, 1953	1	8	S of Tuscumbia	Colbert	0.1 mi (0.16 km)	20 yd (18 m)
F3	April 6, 1953	0	12	NE of McCalla	Jefferson	0.5 mi (0.80 km)	37 yd (34 m)
F3	April 18, 1953	8 (Note: Most deaths and damage occurred when the tornado struck the northern suburbs of Columbus, Georgia.)	495	W of Auburn to Smiths Station	Lee	39.8 mi (64.1 km)‡	400 yd (370 m)
F4	May 1, 1953	7	12	Ashland	Clay	12.1 mi (19.5 km)	440 yd (400 m)
F4	May 1, 1953	2	3	Yantley	Choctaw	0.1 mi (0.16 km)	100 yd (91 m)
F3	March 13, 1954	2	20	E of Seale	Russell	7 mi (11 km)‡	1480 yd (1350 m)
F3	December 5, 1954	0	26	Ohatchee to Piedmont	Calhoun	24.7 mi (39.8 km)	100 yd (91 m)
F3	December 5, 1954	0	7	N of Opelika	Lee	51 mi (82 km)‡	200 yd (180 m)
F4	April 15, 1956	5	20	Falkville	Morgan	8.6 mi (13.8 km)	200 yd (180 m)
F4	April 23, 1956	25	200	W to NE of Birmingham	Jefferson	21.3 mi (34.3 km)	200 yd (180 m)
F3	May 2, 1956	0	2	E of Georgiana	Butler	3.8 mi (6.1 km)	83 yd (76 m)
F3	April 8, 1957	0	0	S of Hamilton to N of Addison	Marion, Winston, Lawrence	51.4 mi (82.7 km)	100 yd (91 m)
F3	April 8, 1957	2	90	SW of Falkville to NW of Guntersville	Morgan, Marshall	38.8 mi (62.4 km)	200 yd (180 m)
F3	April 8, 1957	0	0	W to NE of Arab	Cullman, Marshall	16.3 mi (26.2 km)	10 yd (9.1 m)
F4	November 17, 1957	4	15	N of Jasper	Walker	7.2 mi (11.6 km)	200 yd (180 m)
F4	November 18, 1957	3	12	Rosa to Snead to Albertville	Blount, Marshall	26.1 mi (42.0 km)	100 yd (91 m)
F3	April 5, 1958	0	1	Albertville to Section	Marshall, Jackson	25.7 mi (41.4 km)	100 yd (91 m)
F3	May 12, 1959	0	5	Bessemer to Fairfield	Jefferson	8.6 mi (13.8 km)	440 yd (400 m)
F3	March 7, 1961	0	1	N of Fayette to W of Carbon Hill	Fayette, Walker	19.3 mi (31.1 km)	200 yd (180 m)
F3	March 7, 1961	0	8	W of Fairview to N of Arab	Cullman, Morgan, Marshall	19.3 mi (31.1 km)	200 yd (180 m)
F3	March 31, 1961	0	7	S of Girard	Russell	8.2 mi (13.2 km)‡	167 yd (153 m)
F3	December 10, 1961	0	1	NE of Brewton	Escambia	0.2 mi (0.32 km)	33 yd (30 m)
F3	December 11, 1961	0	2	W to NE of Marion	Perry	9.4 mi (15.1 km)	100 yd (91 m)
F3	December 11, 1961	0	0	Jacksonville	Calhoun	3.3 mi (5.3 km)	200 yd (180 m)
F3	March 20, 1962	0	10	Weaver	Calhoun	2.3 mi (3.7 km)	250 yd (230 m)
F4	March 5, 1963	0	35	S of Bessemer to E of Homewood	Jefferson	14.9 mi (24.0 km)	667 yd (610 m)
F4	March 11, 1963	2	6	SW of Good Hope to NE of Holly Pond	Cullman	28 mi (45 km)	880 yd (800 m)
F3	March 17, 1963	0	4	E of Brent	Bibb	2.7 mi (4.3 km)	100 yd (91 m)
F4	January 24, 1964	10	6	Harpersville	Shelby	3.3 mi (5.3 km)	100 yd (91 m)
F3	March 9, 1964	0	1	E of Russellville to E of Littleville	Franklin, Colbert	10.4 mi (16.7 km)	10 yd (9.1 m)
F3	March 9, 1964	2	2	NW of Rogersville	Lauderdale	5.2 mi (8.4 km)	10 yd (9.1 m)
F3	March 25, 1964	0	7	Addison	Winston	5.4 mi (8.7 km)	267 yd (244 m)
F3	April 28, 1964	0	1	S of Lincoln	Talladega	0.1 mi (0.16 km)	10 yd (9.1 m)
F3	April 28, 1964	0	2	E of Fruithurst	Cleburne	10.6 mi (17.1 km)‡	33 yd (30 m)
F3	February 11, 1965	0	18	SE of Pickensville	Pickens	1.5 mi (2.4 km)	100 yd (91 m)
F3	March 17, 1965	0	22	Muscle Shoals to Anderson	Colbert, Lauderdale, Limestone	29.8 mi (48.0 km)	10 yd (9.1 m)
F3	April 15, 1965	0	2	NE of Henagar	Jackson, DeKalb	9.6 mi (15.4 km)	50 yd (46 m)
F5	March 3, 1966	58 (Note: The majority of fatalities and injuries occurred when the tornado moved through Jackson, Mississippi.)	518	Geiger to N of Tuscaloosa	Pickens, Tuscaloosa	202.5 mi (325.9 km)‡	900 yd (820 m)
F4	March 6, 1967	2	25	S of Cordova to Kimberly	Walker, Jefferson	20.9 mi (33.6 km)	440 yd (400 m)
F3	May 6, 1967	1	25	Homewood	Jefferson	4.3 mi (6.9 km)	200 yd (180 m)
F3	October 24, 1967	0	3	Leighton	Colbert, Lawrence	15 mi (24 km)	10 yd (9.1 m)
F3	October 24, 1967	0	1	Florence	Lauderdale	11.9 mi (19.2 km)	100 yd (91 m)
F3	December 18, 1967	0	0	W of Demopolis	Marengo	7.6 mi (12.2 km)	10 yd (9.1 m)
F3	November 3, 1968	0	18	Saraland to Atmore to Brewton	Mobile, Escambia	70.4 mi (113.3 km)	400 yd (370 m)
F3	November 17, 1968	1	24	S of Thorsby to S of Rockford	Coosa	32.3 mi (52.0 km)	400 yd (370 m)
F4	April 17, 1969	2	14	Greenville to NW of Union Springs	Butler, Crenshaw, Montgomery, Bullock	52.4 mi (84.3 km)	500 yd (460 m)
F3	March 19, 1970	2	14	S of Lanett	Chambers	2 mi (3.2 km)	200 yd (180 m)
F3	February 4, 1971	1	13	S of Hamilton to E of Phil Campbell	Marion, Franklin	34.1 mi (54.9 km)	750 yd (690 m)
F3	February 26, 1971	0	0	S of Eutaw	Greene	4.3 mi (6.9 km)	50 yd (46 m)
F3	March 2, 1971	0	0	Thomasville	Clarke	4.9 mi (7.9 km)	100 yd (91 m)
F3	March 2, 1971	0	0	SW of Brundidge to N of Clio	Pike, Barbour	23.8 mi (38.3 km)	10 yd (9.1 m)
F3	March 2, 1971	0	0	Brundidge	Pike	2 mi (3.2 km)	10 yd (9.1 m)
F4	April 3, 1971	0	0	E of Monroeville to E of Beatrice	Monroe	25.4 mi (40.9 km)	300 yd (270 m)
F3	September 16, 1971	0	0	W of Elba	Coffee	0.3 mi (0.48 km)	100 yd (91 m)
F3	December 19, 1971	0	0	SW of Frisco City	Monroe	1 mi (1.6 km)	100 yd (91 m)
F3	January 12, 1972	0	2	W of Abbeville to SE of Clayton	Henry, Barbour	16.8 mi (27.0 km)	200 yd (180 m)
F4	May 19, 1973	0	19	E of Rainsville	DeKalb	5.4 mi (8.7 km)	400 yd (370 m)
F4	May 27, 1973	7	199	NE of Demopolis to Greensboro to Brent to Childersburg to W of Ranburne	Hale, Perry, Bibb, Shelby, Talladega, Clay, Cleburne	139.1 mi (223.9 km) (Note: As of 2025, this is the longest-tracked tornado to remain fully in Alabama.)	800 yd (730 m)
F3	May 27, 1973	1	44	E of Birmingham to Steele	Jefferson, St. Clair, Etowah	41.6 mi (66.9 km)	800 yd (730 m)
F3	November 27, 1973	0	42	Huntsville	Madison	14.1 mi (22.7 km)	200 yd (180 m)
F3	December 29, 1973	0	11	Enterprise to N of Daleville	Coffee, Dale	11.6 mi (18.7 km)	67 yd (61 m)
F3	December 29, 1973	0	2	Headland to SE of Abbeville	Henry	15 mi (24 km)	70 yd (64 m)
F3	December 30, 1973	0	14	Ozark	Dale	1.5 mi (2.4 km)	120 yd (110 m)
F3	January 26, 1974	1	7	S to E of Wedowee	Randolph	21.3 mi (34.3 km)	150 yd (140 m)
F3	January 27, 1974	0	0	Fayette	Fayette	0.8 mi (1.3 km)	50 yd (46 m)
F3	April 3, 1974	1	6	Huntsville	Madison	8.4 mi (13.5 km)	800 yd (730 m)
F5	April 3, 1974	28	267	W of Moulton to Tanner to E of Athens	Lawrence, Morgan, Limestone, Madison	52 mi (84 km)	500 yd (460 m)
F4	April 3, 1974	3	178	Carrollton to Concord to Jasper to Cullman	Pickens, Tuscaloosa, Fayette, Walker, Cullman	110.6 mi (178.0 km)	500 yd (460 m)
F3	April 3, 1974	0	9	S to E of Centre	Cherokee	20.9 mi (33.6 km)	100 yd (91 m)
F5	April 3, 1974	16	190	Tanner to N of Hazel Green	Limestone, Madison	83.3 mi (134.1 km)‡	500 yd (460 m)
F5	April 3, 1974	28	272	N of Vernon to Guin to Brilliant to SE of Decatur	Lamar, Fayette, Marion, Winston, Lawrence, Morgan	79.5 mi (127.9 km)‡	500 yd (460 m)
F3	April 3, 1974	2	7	SE of Decatur to SE of Huntsville to N of Skyline	Lawrence, Limestone, Madison, Jackson	46.5 mi (74.8 km)	700 yd (640 m)
F3	December 19, 1974	0	1	N of Troy	Pike	0.5 mi (0.80 km)	100 yd (91 m)
F3	December 19, 1974	0	0	SE to E of Troy	Pike	11.3 mi (18.2 km)	300 yd (270 m)

=== 1975–1999 ===
‡ Tornado crossed state lines in or out of Alabama

Intense (F3+) tornadoes in Alabama, 1975–1999
F#	Date	Deaths	Injuries	Location	Counties	Path length	Max width
F3	January 10, 1975	1	60	Pell City to Ragland	St. Clair, Talladega	18.8 mi (30.3 km)	150 yd (140 m)
F4	February 23, 1975	1	49	S to NE of Tuscaloosa	Tuscaloosa	14.4 mi (23.2 km)	500 yd (460 m)
F3	March 12, 1976	0	4	NE of Selma	Dallas, Autaugua	16.5 mi (26.6 km)	100 yd (91 m)
F3	March 12, 1976	0	15	Eclectic	Elmore	4.9 mi (7.9 km)	400 yd (370 m)
F3	March 20, 1976	0	17	SW of Fairview to Baileyton	Cullman	9.3 mi (15.0 km)	100 yd (91 m)
F3	March 20, 1976	0	11	Cleveland to E of Snead	Blount	19.2 mi (30.9 km)	40 yd (37 m)
F3	March 30, 1977	0	2	Geraldine	DeKalb	9.2 mi (14.8 km)	50 yd (46 m)
F5	April 4, 1977	22	130	McDonald Chapel to S of Fultondale to S of Center Point	Jefferson	14.7 mi (23.7 km)	550 yd (500 m)
F3	April 4, 1977	1	0	Ashville to SE of Steele	St. Clair	7.3 mi (11.7 km)	150 yd (140 m)
F3	April 18, 1978	0	30	W to N of Monroeville	Monroe	10.5 mi (16.9 km)	220 yd (200 m)
F3	November 25, 1979	0	20	E of Montgomery to S of Wetumpka	Montgomery, Elmore	10.2 mi (16.4 km)	150 yd (140 m)
F3	March 31, 1981	2	23	E of Hurtsboro	Russell	0.1 mi (0.16 km)	100 yd (91 m)
F3	April 24, 1982	0	0	Dauphin Island	Mobile	1.5 mi (2.4 km)	100 yd (91 m)
F3	April 26, 1982	0	0	SW to SE of Guin	Lamar, Marion	12 mi (19 km)	200 yd (180 m)
F3	May 15, 1983	0	1	New Brockton	Coffee	1.5 mi (2.4 km)	150 yd (140 m)
F3	May 19, 1983	0	3	NE of Fort Payne	DeKalb	1.2 mi (1.9 km)	473 yd (433 m)
F3	November 14, 1983	0	19	S to NE of Cullman	Cullman	17 mi (27 km)	200 yd (180 m)
F3	December 3, 1983	2	51	Oxford	Calhoun, Talladega	4 mi (6.4 km)	150 yd (140 m)
F3	December 5, 1983	1	19	W to NE of Selma	Dallas, Autaugua	13 mi (21 km)	500 yd (460 m)
F3	March 24, 1984	0	0	Jackson	Clarke	4 mi (6.4 km)	60 yd (55 m)
F3	May 3, 1984	5	37	W to NW of Montgomery	Autaugua, Elmore	7 mi (11 km)	800 yd (730 m)
F3	April 5, 1985	0	0	N of Fairview	Cullman	3 mi (4.8 km)	100 yd (91 m)
F3	April 5, 1985	0	5	N of Douglas to Albertville	Marshall	8 mi (13 km)	277 yd (253 m)
F3	April 5, 1985	0	1	Sardis City	Etowah	8 mi (13 km)	500 yd (460 m)
F3	August 16, 1985	0	6	SE of Cullman to E of Somerville	Cullman, Morgan	32 mi (51 km)	100 yd (91 m)
F3	August 16, 1985	0	2	W of Hartselle to E of Lester	Morgan, Limestone	45 mi (72 km)	100 yd (91 m)
F3	March 12, 1986	2	0	W of Carrollton	Pickens	16 mi (26 km)	700 yd (640 m)
F3	March 12, 1986	0	0	E of Millport	Lamar	6 mi (9.7 km)	500 yd (460 m)
F3	March 12, 1986	0	0	W of Winfield	Marion	2.5 mi (4.0 km)	200 yd (180 m)
F3	November 25, 1986	0	4	New Brockton to Ariton to Clayton	Coffee, Dale, Barbour	44 mi (71 km)	200 yd (180 m)
F3	January 19, 1988	0	35	Cullman	Cullman	10 mi (16 km)	440 yd (400 m)
F3	November 4, 1988	0	0	W of Waterloo	Lauderdale	7 mi (11 km)‡	200 yd (180 m)
F3	November 4, 1988	0	16	N of Red Bay to Leighton to N of Town Creek	Franklin, Colbert, Lawrence	60 mi (97 km)	200 yd (180 m)
F3	November 4, 1988	0	0	W of Millry	Washington	8 mi (13 km)‡	200 yd (180 m)
F3	November 19, 1988	0	8	Tuscaloosa	Tuscaloosa	0.5 mi (0.80 km)	400 yd (370 m)
F4	November 15, 1989	21	463	S to E of Huntsville	Madison	18.5 mi (29.8 km)	880 yd (800 m)
F3	March 9, 1992	2	7	E of Forkland to S of Greensboro	Greene, Hale	18 mi (29 km)	440 yd (400 m)
F3	February 21, 1993	0	5	N of Piedmont	Cherokee	39 mi (63 km)	100 yd (91 m)
F3	March 27, 1994	0	20	Fyffe	DeKalb	23 mi (37 km)	700 yd (640 m)
F4	March 27, 1994	22	150	S of Ragland to Piedmont	St. Clair, Etowah, Cherokee	50 mi (80 km)	880 yd (800 m)
F3	June 26, 1994	0	22	S of Lexington	Lauderdale	38 mi (61 km)	880 yd (800 m)
F3	June 26, 1994	0	0	NW of Athens	Limestone	3 mi (4.8 km)	300 yd (270 m)
F3	February 16, 1995	6	120	Joppa to Arab	Cullman, Blount, Marshall	14 mi (23 km)	703 yd (643 m)
F4	May 18, 1995	1	55	N of Athens to N of Huntsville	Limestone, Madison, Jackson	39 mi (63 km)	1300 yd (1200 m)
F3	March 5, 1996	4	40	W to N of Selma	Dallas	19 mi (31 km)	400 yd (370 m)
F3	March 18, 1996	0	0	Lake Martin Reservoir	Elmore, Tallapoosa	24 mi (39 km)	440 yd (400 m)
F3	November 21, 1997	0	0	Saraland	Mobile	1 mi (1.6 km)	300 yd (270 m)
F3	April 8, 1998	0	1	S of Gordo to NE of Coker	Pickens, Tuscaloosa	19.5 mi (31.4 km)	300 yd (270 m)
F5	April 8, 1998	32	259	Bull City to W of Birmingham	Tuscaloosa, Jefferson	30.3 mi (48.8 km)	1320 yd (1210 m)

=== 2000–2006 ===
Intense (F3+) tornadoes in Alabama, 2000–2006
F#	Date	Deaths	Injuries	Location	Counties	Path length	Max width
F4	December 16, 2000	11	144	S of Tuscaloosa	Tuscaloosa	18 mi (29 km)	750 yd (690 m)
F3	December 16, 2000	0	14	NE of Gadsden to SW of Centre	Etowah, Cherokee	12.8 mi (20.6 km)	500 yd (460 m)
F3	October 13, 2001	0	0	N of Foley	Baldwin	1 mi (1.6 km)	440 yd (400 m)
F3	November 24, 2001	2	1	Kennedy to Fayette to Carbon Hill	Lamar, Fayette, Walker	38.9 mi (62.6 km)	300 yd (270 m)
F4	November 24, 2001	0	22	E of Oneonta	Blount, Etowah	10.1 mi (16.3 km)	500 yd (460 m)
F3	November 10, 2002	0	55	W of Millport	Pickens, Lamar	29.2 mi (47.0 km)	440 yd (400 m)
F3	November 10, 2002	4	38	N of Fayette to Carbon Hill to S of Arley	Fayette, Walker, Winston	44.3 mi (71.3 km)	1175 yd (1074 m)
F3	November 10, 2002	7	53	N of Fayette to E Carbon Hill to Holly Pond	Fayette, Walker, Winston, Cullman	72.6 mi (116.8 km)	1175 yd (1074 m)

=== 2007–present ===
‡ Tornado crossed state lines in or out of Alabama

Intense (EF3+) tornadoes in Alabama, 2007–present
EF#	Date	Deaths	Injuries	Location	Counties	Path length	Max width
EF4	March 1, 2007	1	2	N of Camden	Wilcox, Dallas	18.3 mi (29.5 km)	500 yd (460 m)
EF4	March 1, 2007	9	50	Enterprise	Coffee	10.3 mi (16.6 km)	500 yd (460 m)
EF3	January 10, 2008	0	11	W of Vernon	Lamar	13.2 mi (21.2 km)‡	2500 yd (2300 m)
EF3	January 10, 2008	0	0	Windham Springs	Tuscaloosa	5.6 mi (9.0 km)	350 yd (320 m)
EF4	February 5, 2008	4	23	S to E of Moulton	Lawrence, Morgan	16.7 mi (26.9 km)	880 yd (800 m)
EF4	February 5, 2008	1	12	E of Pisgah to S of Flat Rock	Jackson	10.9 mi (17.5 km)	660 yd (600 m)
EF3	February 17, 2008	0	50	Prattville to Millbrook	Autauga, Elmore	14.7 mi (23.7 km)	440 yd (400 m)
EF3	April 10, 2009	0	5	S of Grant to N of Rainsville	Marshall, Jackson, DeKalb	32.5 mi (52.3 km)	440 yd (400 m)
EF3	April 24, 2010	0	0	Cordova to N of Warrior	Walker, Jefferson, Blount	29.6 mi (47.6 km)	400 yd (370 m)
EF3	April 24, 2010	0	45	Albertville to Geraldine	Blount, Marshall, DeKalb	39.8 mi (64.1 km)	1320 yd (1210 m)
EF4	April 24, 2010	0	5	S of Crossville to N of Powell	DeKalb	16.6 mi (26.7 km)	880 yd (800 m)
EF3	April 15, 2011	0	0	N of Moundville to Tuscaloosa	Greene, Tuscaloosa	18.4 mi (29.6 km)	500 yd (460 m)
EF3	April 15, 2011	1	4	W of Linden	Marengo	15.3 mi (24.6 km)	800 yd (730 m)
EF3	April 15, 2011	3	4	W of Deatsville	Autaugua	9.3 mi (15.0 km)	400 yd (370 m)
EF3	April 15, 2011	0	5	S of Geiger	Sumter	48.5 mi (78.1 km)‡	1760 yd (1610 m)
EF3	April 27, 2011	0	0	S to E of Gordo	Pickens, Tuscaloosa	22.5 mi (36.2 km)	704 yd (644 m)
EF3	April 27, 2011	0	0	N of Coaling to E of Lake View	Tuscaloosa, Jefferson	20.3 mi (32.7 km)	200 yd (180 m)
EF3	April 27, 2011	0	20	Cordova	Walker	18.9 mi (30.4 km)	375 yd (343 m)
EF4	April 27, 2011	6	48	Cullman to N of Arab	Cullman, Morgan, Marshall	46.9 mi (75.5 km)	880 yd (800 m)
EF5	April 27, 2011	71 (Note: As of 2025, this tornado is the deadliest in Alabama history.)	145	Hackleburg to Phil Campbell to Harvest	Marion, Franklin, Lawrence, Morgan, Limestone, Madison	102 mi (164 km)	2200 yd (2000 m)
EF4	April 27, 2011	13	54	Reform to Cordova to NE of Blountsville	Pickens, Tuscaloosa, Fayette, Walker, Cullman, Blount	127.8 mi (205.7 km)	1408 yd (1287 m)
EF5	April 27, 2011	23 (Note: The majority of fatalities and injuries occurred when the tornado struck the town of Smithville, Mississippi at EF5 intensity; the tornado was only at EF3-maximum intensity during the Alabama portion of its track)	137	SE of Shottsville	Marion	37.1 mi (59.7 km)‡	1320 yd (1210 m)
EF3	April 27, 2011	0	2	NW to NE of Geiger	Sumter, Pickens	23.7 mi (38.1 km)	1056 yd (966 m)
EF4	April 27, 2011	15	50	SW of Pisgah to Flat Rock	Jackson, DeKalb	47 mi (76 km)‡	1260 yd (1150 m)
EF4	April 27, 2011	64	1500	Tuscaloosa to N of Birmingham	Greene, Tuscaloosa, Jefferson	80.7 mi (129.9 km)	2600 yd (2400 m)
EF4	April 27, 2011	1	0	Fackler to NE of Bridgeport	Jackson	30.2 mi (48.6 km)‡	1320 yd (1210 m)
EF3	April 27, 2011	0	25	S of Hamilton to Haleyville	Marion, Winston	80.7 mi (129.9 km)	1320 yd (1210 m)
EF3	April 27, 2011	7	50	W of Forkland to Eoline	Hale, Greene, Bibb	72.1 mi (116.0 km)	1760 yd (1610 m)
EF4	April 27, 2011	7	17	Yantley to N of Uniontown	Choctaw, Sumter, Marengo, Hale, Perry	122 mi (196 km)‡	1050 yd (960 m)
EF3	April 27, 2011	0	0	S of Winfield	Fayette	8 mi (13 km)	880 yd (800 m)
EF5	April 27, 2011	25	0	Lakeview to Rainsville to S of Shiloh	DeKalb	37.2 mi (59.9 km)‡	1320 yd (1210 m)
EF4	April 27, 2011	22	85	W of Margaret to SE of Forney	Jefferson, St. Clair, Calhoun, Etowah, Cherokee	97.3 mi (156.6 km)‡	1760 yd (1610 m)
EF4	April 27, 2011	7	30	Lake Martin Reservoir	Elmore, Tallapoosa, Chambers	44.2 mi (71.1 km)	880 yd (800 m)
EF3	January 22, 2012	1	75	Center Point to Clay	Jefferson, St. Clair	15.7 mi (25.3 km)	800 yd (730 m)
EF3	March 2, 2012	0	0	S of Athens to N of New Market	Limestone, Madison	44.2 mi (71.1 km)	250 yd (230 m)
EF3	April 11, 2013	1	9	N of Pickensville	Pickens	66.3 mi (106.7 km)‡	1320 yd (1210 m)
EF3	April 28, 2014	2	30	W to N of Athens	Limestone	15.6 mi (25.1 km)	600 yd (550 m)
EF3	April 28, 2014	0	0	E of Cullman	Cullman	8.9 mi (14.3 km)	350 yd (320 m)
EF3	April 28, 2014	0	0	E of Boaz	Etowah, DeKalb	11.7 mi (18.8 km)	600 yd (550 m)
EF3	April 28, 2014	0	13	Smiths Station	Russell, Lee	11.4 mi (18.3 km)	1200 yd (1100 m)
EF3	February 15, 2016	0	3	W of Pollard	Escambia	16.4 mi (26.4 km)‡	300 yd (270 m)
EF3	November 29, 2016	0	0	S of Decatur	Morgan	6.2 mi (10.0 km)	175 yd (160 m)
EF3	November 29, 2016	4	9	E of Pisgah to N of Ider	Jackson, DeKalb	13.5 mi (21.7 km)	206 yd (188 m)
EF3	March 19, 2018	0	4	Jacksonville to N of Fruithurst	Calhoun, Cleburne	35 mi (56 km)‡	2175 yd (1989 m)
EF4	March 3, 2019	23	90	E of Tuskegee to Smiths Station	Macon, Lee	68 mi (109 km)‡	1600 yd (1500 m)
EF3	December 16, 2019	0	2	W of Lisman	Choctaw	61.2 mi (98.5 km)‡	350 yd (320 m)
EF3	January 25, 2021	1	30	Fultondale to Center Point	Jefferson	10.4 mi (16.7 km)	900 yd (820 m)
EF3	March 25, 2021	0	0	E of Moundville	Hale, Tuscaloosa	11.1 mi (17.9 km)	1400 yd (1300 m)
EF3	March 25, 2021	0	13	N of Greensboro to S of Calera	Hale, Perry, Bibb, Chilton, Shelby	79.7 mi (128.3 km)	2300 yd (2100 m)
EF3	March 25, 2021	0	5	N of West Blocton to S of Leeds	Bibb, Shelby, St. Clair	50.1 mi (80.6 km)	1140 yd (1040 m)
EF3	March 25, 2021	6	10	E of Ragland to N of Piedmont	Calhoun, Cherokee	38.2 mi (61.5 km)	1700 yd (1600 m)
EF3	March 30, 2022	0	2	S to NE of Brent	Perry, Bibb, Shelby	29.2 mi (47.0 km)	1200 yd (1100 m)
EF3	January 12, 2023	7	16	W of Deatsville to N of LaFayette	Autauga, Elmore, Coosa, Tallapoosa, Chambers	82.3 mi (132.4 km)	1500 yd (1400 m)
EF3	March 31, 2023	1	5	N of New Market	Madison	12 mi (19 km)	215 yd (197 m)
EF3	May 8, 2024	0	0	W of Athens	Lawrence, Limestone	3.8 mi (6.1 km)	230 yd (210 m)
EF3	May 8, 2024	0	7	W to E of Henagar	Jackson, DeKalb	12.4 mi (20.0 km)	880 yd (800 m)
EF3	March 15, 2025	2	2	S of Plantersville to W of Clanton	Dallas, Chilton	24.3 mi (39.1 km)	1000 yd (910 m)
EF3	March 15, 2025	0	0	SE of Alexander City to Daviston	Tallapoosa	20.4 mi (32.8 km)	800 yd (730 m)

== See also ==
- Tornadoes in Oklahoma
