= Michael Krohngold =

Michael Krohngold (born 1960) is the founder and owner of the Tongue & Groove night club and other entertainment venues in Atlanta, Georgia.

== Career ==
Krohngold was the general manager of Club Rio in Downtown Atlanta before opening his first bar, Colorbox, in Virginia-Highland in 1987 with partner, Louie Spetrini. A year later, the partners opened another Colorbox in Athens, Georgia, as well as Cariocas Patio Bar in Midtown Atlanta in 1989 and Velvet nightclub in Downtown Atlanta in 1990.

Krohngold opened nightclub, Tongue & Groove in 1994 with business partners, Scott Strumlauf and Marc Cooperman. Two years later in 1996, one week before the Olympics opening ceremony took place, Krohngold, along with partners Scott Strumlauf, Marc Cooperman, Dee Grimes and consulting chef Guenter Seeger, opened Mumbo Jumbo, a 200 seat modern American restaurant located in downtown Atlanta. One year later, Atlanta Mayor Bill Campbell honored Mumbo Jumbo with a proclamation for serving as an economic catalyst to the revitalization of downtown Atlanta. In 1998, he worked with Cooperman and investor, L.A. Reid to debut Fusebox restaurant in Buckhead, which was named Best New Restaurant by Esquire. A year later, Krohngold opened Deux Plex Bistro and Dance Club on Cheshire Bridge Road with partners Paul Sullivan and Beatrice Miranda. Four years later, Krohngold, Strumlauf, and Jim Sullivan started Jack Rabbit Lounge in Buckhead Village. In 2004, Krohngold performed his first gig as a DJ using the stagename DJ KrohnicGold.

In 2007, the original Tongue & Groove location was closed after a lease buyout by Ben Carter Properties. Krohngold and Strumlauf then formed a nightlife consulting company called Wildlife Resource Management, LLC before opening the new Tongue & Groove at Lindbergh City Center in 2008 with new operating partner, David Kreidler. In 2014, Krohngold and partner Strumlauf were honored by Atlanta Community Food Bank as one of Atlanta’s premier hospitality duos and Tongue & Groove celebrated its 20th anniversary and was honored by the City of Atlanta with a proclamation recognizing the club as Atlanta’s longest running nightclub.
