= Fruithurst, Alabama =

- Town
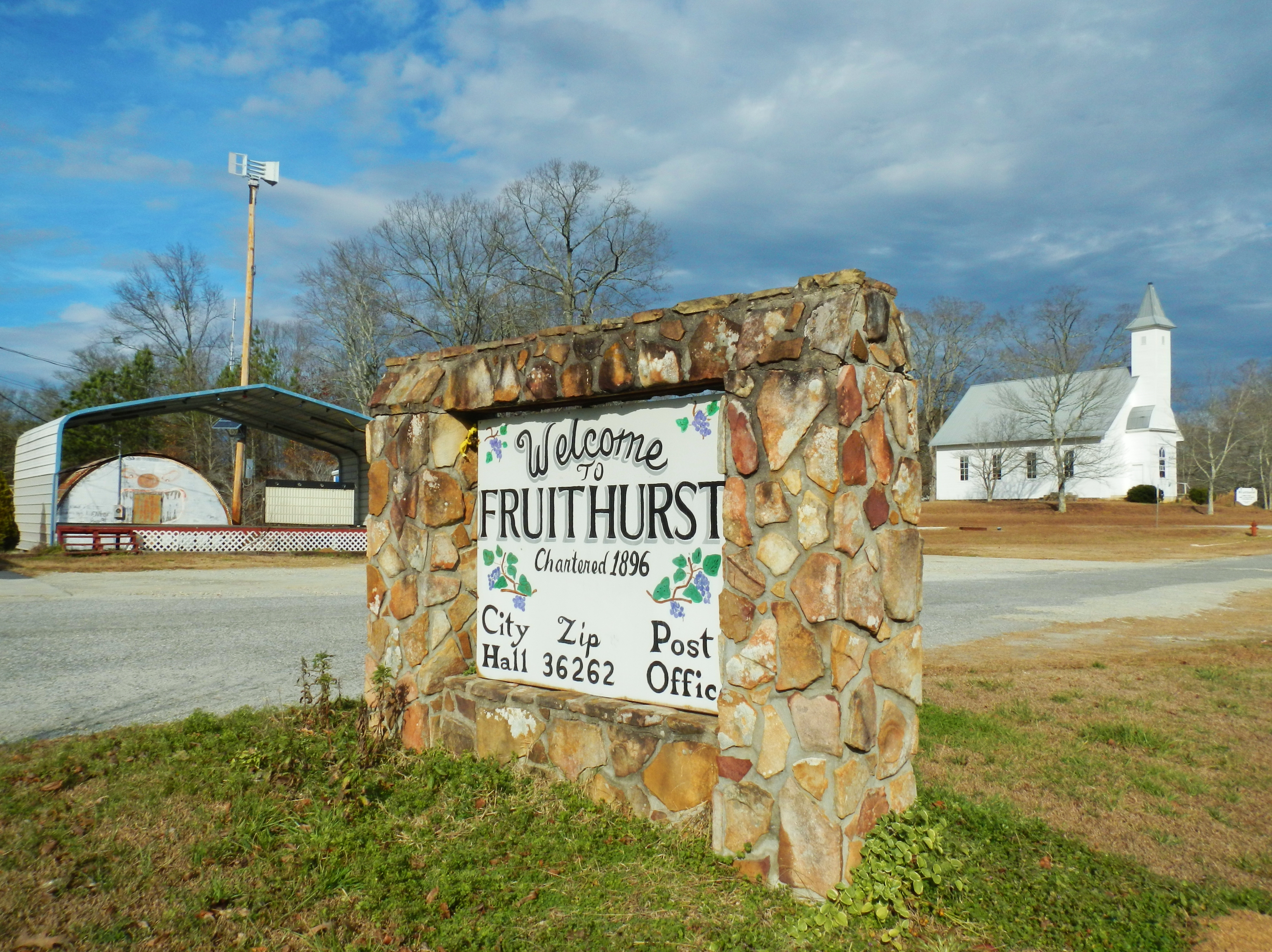
- Fruithurst welcome sign

- Location of Fruithurst in Cleburne County, Alabama.
- Coordinates: 33°43′46″N 85°25′53″W
- Country: United States
- State: Alabama
- County: Cleburne

Area
  - Total: 1.00 sq mi (2.59 km^{2})
  - Land: 1.00 sq mi (2.59 km^{2})
  - Water: 0 sq mi (0.00 km^{2})
- Elevation: 1,070 ft (330 m)

Population (2020)
  - Total: 235
  - Density: 234.9/sq mi (90.71/km^{2})
- Time zone: UTC-6 (Central (CST))
  - Summer (DST): UTC-5 (CDT)
- ZIP code: 36262
- Area code: 256
- FIPS code: 01-28432
- GNIS feature ID: 2406529

Fruithurst is a town in Cleburne County, Alabama, United States. At the 2020 census, the population was 235.

== Geography ==
According to the U.S. Census Bureau, the city has a total area of 1.0 square mile (2.6 km^{2}), all land.

== History ==
Fruithurst once had a reputation for being a notorious speed trap along US Highway 78. Abuse of policing reached such an extent that in 1975 Alabama Attorney General Bill Baxley set up an office in the town, personally pledging to provide criminal defense to any person arrested or cited in the town. Additionally Reason magazine reported in May 2022 that, "...one case involved a woman arrested for traveling 58 in a 55-mph zone. She was also charged with transporting untaxed liquor—a half-empty miniature bottle of liqueur in her purse..." stating this was, "...both an abuse of law enforcement powers and a mockery of the very idea of legitimate traffic safety enforcement."

== Demographics ==
Historical population
Census	Pop.	Note	%±
1900	374		—
1910	257		−31.3%
1920	223		−13.2%
1930	225		0.9%
1940	281		24.9%
1950	318		13.2%
1960	255		−19.8%
1970	229		−10.2%
1980	239		4.4%
1990	177		−25.9%
2000	270		52.5%
2010	284		5.2%
2020	235		−17.3%
U.S. Decennial Census; 2013 Estimate

At the 2000 census there were 270 people in 107 households, including 74 families, in the city. The population density was 264.8 inhabitants per square mile (102.2/km^{2}). There were 111 housing units at an average density of 108.9 per square mile (42.0/km^{2}). The racial makeup of the city was 99.63% White and 0.37% Black or African American. 0.74% of the population were Hispanic or Latino of any race. Of the 107 households 30.8% had children under the age of 18 living with them, 53.3% were married couples living together, 10.3% had a female householder with no husband present, and 30.8% were non-families. 28.0% of households were one person and 13.1% were one person aged 65 or older. The average household size was 2.41 and the average family size was 2.93.

The age distribution was 20.4% under the age of 18, 12.6% from 18 to 24, 24.4% from 25 to 44, 27.8% from 45 to 64, and 14.8% 65 or older. The median age was 38 years. For every 100 females, there were 98.5 males. For every 100 females age 18 and over, there were 87.0 males.

The median household income was $27,813 and the median family income was $31,667. Males had a median income of $22,188 versus $16,250 for females. The per capita income for the city was $18,130. About 17.0% of families and 17.9% of the population were below the poverty line, including 19.5% of those under the age of eighteen and 2.6% of those sixty five or over.
