= Littleville, Alabama =

- Town
- Location of Littleville in Colbert County, Alabama.
- Coordinates: 34°35′42″N 87°40′19″W
- Country: United States
- State: Alabama
- County: Colbert

Area
  - Total: 5.02 sq mi (12.99 km^{2})
  - Land: 4.97 sq mi (12.88 km^{2})
  - Water: 0.046 sq mi (0.12 km^{2})
- Elevation: 686 ft (209 m)

Population (2020)
  - Total: 1,038
  - Density: 209/sq mi (80.6/km^{2})
- Time zone: UTC-6 (Central (CST))
  - Summer (DST): UTC-5 (CDT)
- FIPS code: 01-43648
- GNIS feature ID: 2406027

Littleville is a town located on the southern border of Colbert County, Alabama, United States, and extends into Franklin County. It is part of the Florence - Muscle Shoals Metropolitan Statistical Area known as "The Shoals". As of the 2020 census, Littleville had a population of 1,038.

== History ==
The town was named for Captain Little, who kept a store there.

== Geography ==
Littleville is located in southern Colbert County, a small portion of the town extends into Franklin County to the south.

According to the U.S. Census Bureau, the town has a total area of 5.0 square miles (13.0 km^{2}), of which 5.0 square miles (12.9 km^{2}) is land and 0.04 square miles (0.1 km^{2}), or 0.90%, is water.

== Demographics ==
Historical population
Census	Pop.	Note	%±
1960	460		—
1970	858		86.5%
1980	1,262		47.1%
1990	925		−26.7%
2000	978		5.7%
2010	1,011		3.4%
2020	1,038		2.7%
U.S. Decennial Census; 2013 Estimate

=== 2020 census ===
As of the 2020 census, Littleville had a population of 1,038, with 444 households and 287 families residing in the town. The median age was 44.9 years. 19.3% of residents were under the age of 18 and 21.9% of residents were 65 years of age or older. For every 100 females there were 96.6 males, and for every 100 females age 18 and over there were 92.6 males age 18 and over.

0.0% of residents lived in urban areas, while 100.0% lived in rural areas.

Of the 444 households, 27.5% had children under the age of 18 living in them. Of all households, 50.7% were married-couple households, 18.0% were households with a male householder and no spouse or partner present, and 25.2% were households with a female householder and no spouse or partner present. About 28.6% of all households were made up of individuals, and 14.4% had someone living alone who was 65 years of age or older.

There were 488 housing units, of which 9.0% were vacant. The homeowner vacancy rate was 0.6% and the rental vacancy rate was 9.0%.

Littleville racial composition
Race	Num.	Perc.
White (non-Hispanic)	921	88.73%
Black or African American (non-Hispanic)	10	0.96%
Native American	3	0.29%
Asian	14	1.35%
Other/Mixed	42	4.05%
Hispanic or Latino	48	4.62%

=== 2000 census ===
As of the census of 2000, there were 978 people, 395 households, and 297 families residing in the town. The population density was 193.8 inhabitants per square mile (74.8/km^{2}). There were 432 housing units at an average density of 85.6 per square mile (33.1/km^{2}). The racial makeup of the town was 98.57% White, 0.51% Native American, and 0.92% from two or more races. 0.82% of the population were Hispanic or Latino of any race.

There were 395 households, out of which 31.9% had children under the age of 18 living with them, 65.1% were married couples living together, 8.6% had a female householder with no husband present, and 24.6% were non-families. 21.8% of all households were made up of individuals, and 8.6% had someone living alone who was 65 years of age or older. The average household size was 2.48 and the average family size was 2.89.

In the town, the population was spread out, with 23.7% under the age of 18, 7.3% from 18 to 24, 30.5% from 25 to 44, 26.0% from 45 to 64, and 12.6% who were 65 years of age or older. The median age was 38 years. For every 100 females, there were 94.8 males. For every 100 females age 18 and over, there were 92.3 males.

The median income for a household in the town was $32,583, and the median income for a family was $35,913. Males had a median income of $31,852 versus $21,250 for females. The per capita income for the town was $14,372. About 11.1% of families and 13.1% of the population were below the poverty line, including 14.2% of those under age 18 and 16.1% of those age 65 or over.
