= 1984 Montgomery tornado =

1984 tornado in Alabama, U.S.

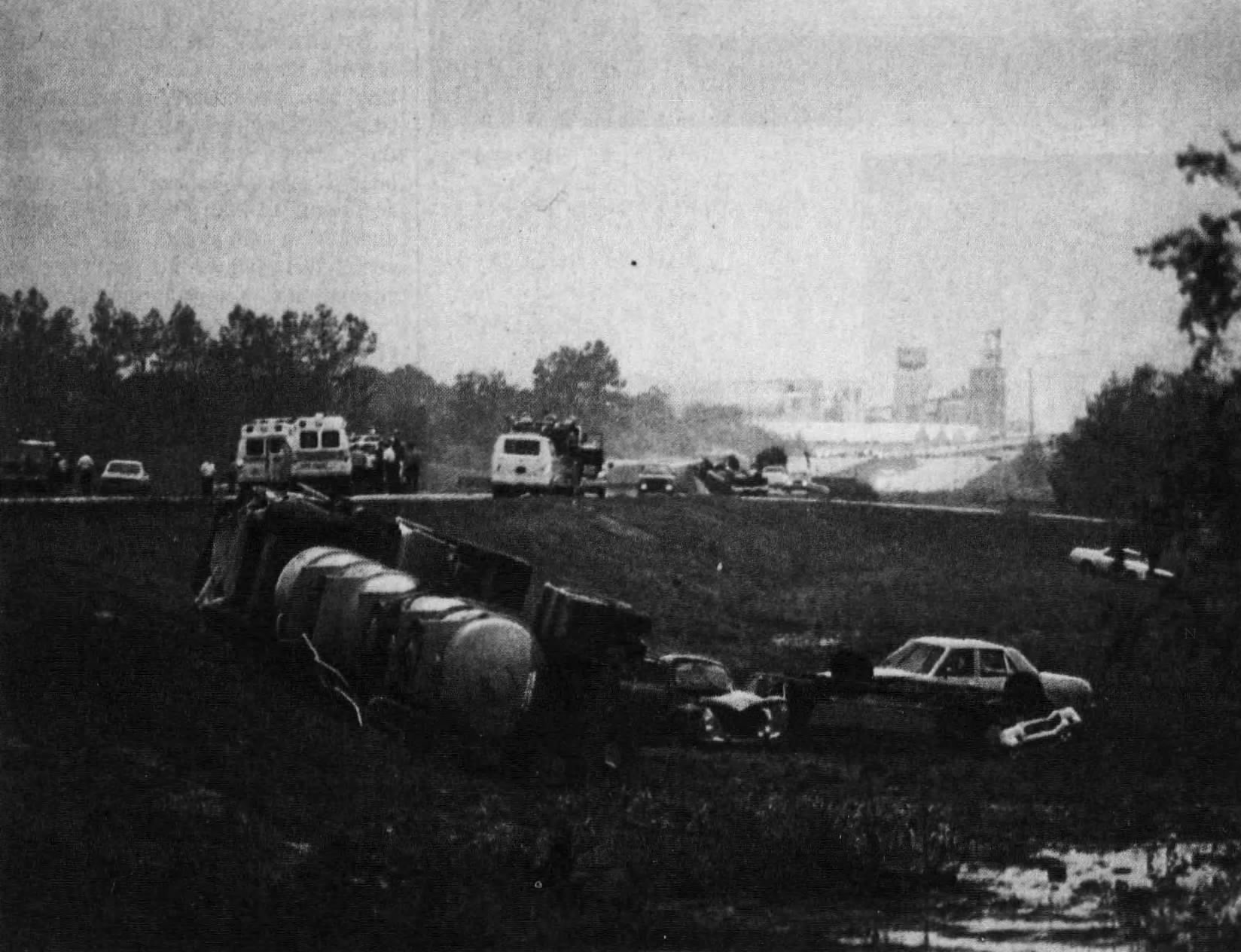
- A tanker truck that was thrown 100 yards off of U.S. 231

Meteorological history
- Date: May 3, 1984
- Formed: May 3, 1984 , 7:05 a.m. CDT (UTC−05:00)
- Dissipated: May 3, 1984 , 7:20 a.m. CDT (UTC−05:00)
- Duration: 15 minutes

F3 tornado
- on the Fujita scale
- Highest winds: 158–206 mph (254–332 km/h)

Overall effects
- Fatalities: 5
- Injuries: 37
- Damage: $2.6-2.7 million (1984 USD)
- Areas affected: Montgomery County, Alabama
- Part of the Tornadoes of 1984

In the morning hours of May 3, 1984, an intense tornado moved through the Montgomery metropolitan area, located in the U.S. state of Alabama. The tornado, which was rated F3 on the Fujita scale, killed five people and injured 37 others along a 7-mile (11 km) path.

== Meteorological synopsis ==
The National Severe Forecast Center issued a tornado watch for the Montgomery area at 5:30 a.m. (Note: Unless stated otherwise, all times in the article are in Central Daylight Time.) on May 3.

== Tornado summary ==
The tornado first touched down at 7:05 a.m., moving along Lower Wetumpka Road and Yarbrough Street as it moved southeast. Three businesses were destroyed along the roads, with four more being damaged. The tornado curved northeast along the Highland Garden, moving across Interstate 65 and entering a neighborhood. Damage was extensive on the northern side of town, with a dozen homes being destroyed and others being significantly damaged. The tornado then impacted an intersection on U.S. Route 231, lofting more vehicles and overturning tractor trailers. An 18-wheeler semi truck was blown over on the highway; the driver reported that the tornado "just about tore my clothes off me". The majority of fatalities from the tornado occurred at the intersection. To the northeast a woman was killed in a mobile home that had been set aloft and landed upside down in the Madison Park neighborhood, being moved 30 yards (27 m) across Fuller Road.

== Aftermath ==
Monetary damage costs were estimated by Montgomery mayor Emory Folmar at $2.6 million to $2.7 million. Officials with the International Red Cross and Red Crescent Movement used a motel in the city as a shelter for those who were left homeless as a result of the tornado. 17 victims were taken to the Baptist Medical Center, while 13 others were treated at Jackson Hospital. Injuries due to the tornado were noted as ranging from bruises to serious injuries, including a heart attack. Meteorologist Rich Thomas stated that tornado deaths in Montgomery County are rare.

Name	Age	Location	Ref.
Patricia Washington	30	Madison Park	
Carl Stevens	N/A	U.S. Route 231	
Lawrence Winn II	N/A	U.S. Route 231	
Donald Causey	N/A	U.S. Route 231	
Judy Causey	N/A	U.S. Route 231	

== See also ==
- Tornadoes in Alabama
