= Tongue & Groove (Atlanta) =

Coordinates: 33°49′20″N 84°22′07″W

Located in Buckhead, Atlanta, Tongue & Groove is the longest running nightclub and lounge in Atlanta. Originally opened at Buckhead Village in 1994, the nightclub relocated in 2007 to its current Buckhead location, just off of Piedmont Road. The venue regularly hosts events and features musical guests from around the world. It is owned and operated by Michael Krohngold, Scott Strumlauf, and David Kreidler. It has been featured in The New York Times, USA Today and Atlanta Magazine. It was also featured on TMZ and E! Entertainment News.

== History and renovation ==
Located in the former Buckhead Village, the original Tongue & Groove was opened by Marc Cooperman, Michael Krohngold and Scott Strumlauf in 1994 and was named Best New Nightclub by Atlanta Magazine. The nightclub was displaced by developers in July 2007 and reopened in 2008 at its current location just off Piedmont Road in Buckhead. The new, 8,600 square-foot Tongue & Groove is an updated and a larger version of the original, again with two rooms for creating two distinctly different environments. In 2012, The Joint was debuted as a redesign of the club’s second room. The 1,500 square-foot space allows for an alternative music format and is frequently used to host private events.

== Notable guest appearances ==
Catering to an upscale crowd that enjoys fashion, music, art and nightlife, Tongue & Groove has welcomed numerous non-paid celebrity guests since opening in 1994. Some of the most notable appearances include club-regular and music producer Dallas Austin hosting friends Madonna, Naomi Campbell, Denzel Washington, Quincy Jones, Wesley Snipes, and Ashlee Simpson and her fiancé Evan Ross on various nights; Mick Jagger (1998); Janet Jackson and Jermaine Dupri (2006); Tiger Woods (2000); Kid Rock (2011); Sean “P. Diddy” Combs (2013); Justin Bieber (2014).
