= Palm Beach Tan =

American tanning salon chain

- Industry: Indoor tanning
- Founded: 1990; 36 years ago in Dallas
- Founder: Parrish Medley
- Headquarters: Dallas, United States
- Number of locations: More than 460 (2018)
- Area served: United States
- Key people: Diane Lucas (president and CEO)
- Website: palmbeachtan.com

Palm Beach Tan is a chain of indoor tanning facilities based in Dallas, Texas. Founded in 1990 by Parrish Medley. It is the largest indoor tanning chain in the United States, with over 660 locations under the Palm Beach Tan, Palm Beach Beauty and Tan, and Planet Tan brands. Palm Beach Tan provides sunless tanning, sunbed tanning and wellness services.

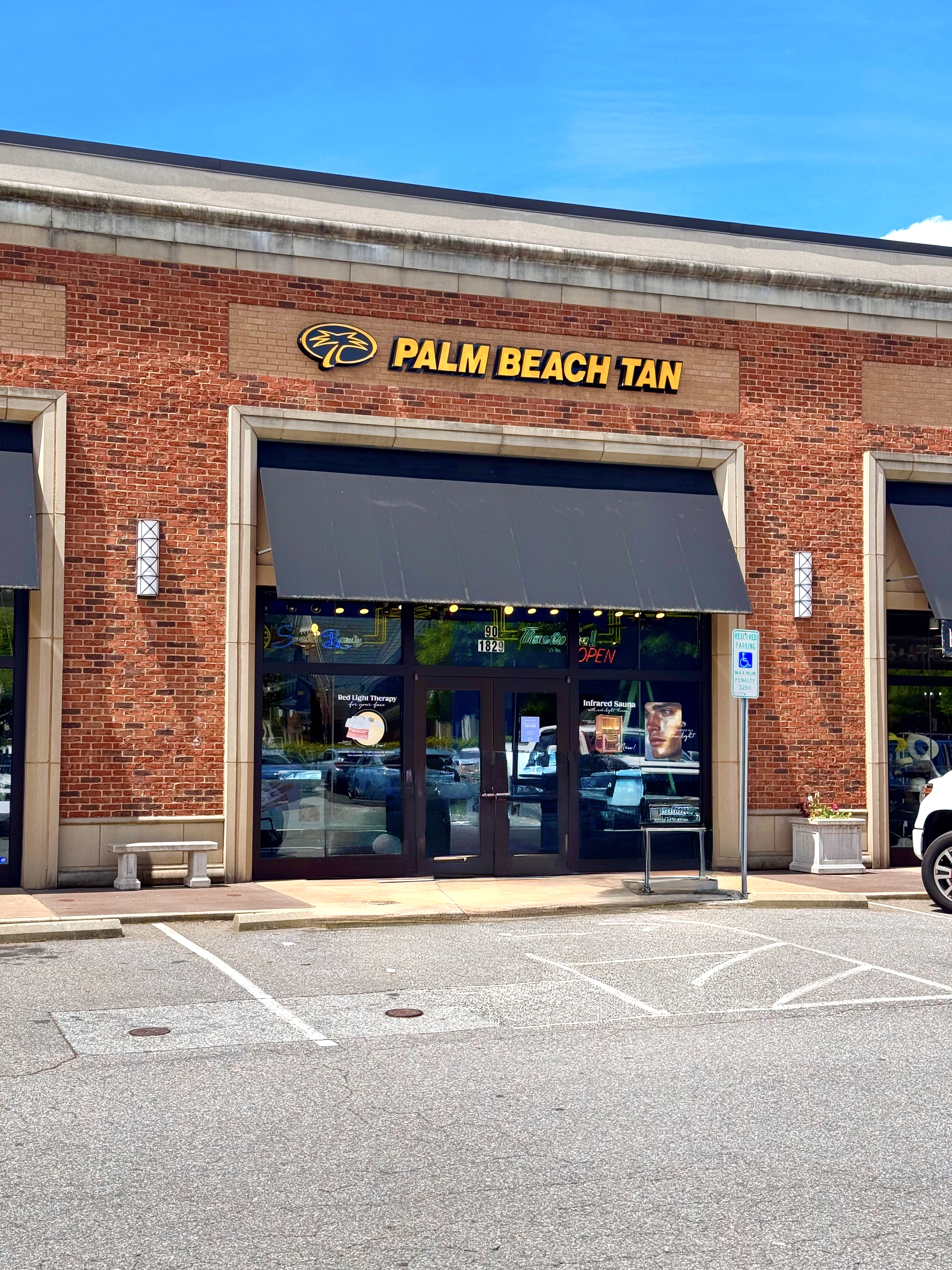
A Palm Beach Tan salon in Asheville, North Carolina
