= National Register of Historic Places listings in Butler County, Alabama =

Location of Butler County in Alabama

This is a list of the National Register of Historic Places listings in Butler County, Alabama.

This is intended to be a complete list of the properties and districts on the National Register of Historic Places in Butler County, Alabama, United States. Latitude and longitude coordinates are provided for many National Register properties and districts; these locations may be seen together in a Google map.

There are 31 properties and districts listed on the National Register in the county.

This National Park Service list is complete through NPS recent listings posted May 1, 2026.

== Current listings ==
	Name on the Register	Image	Date listed	Location	City or town	Description
1	W.S. Blackwell House	W.S. Blackwell House	September 4, 1986 (#86001751)	211 Ft. Dale St. 31°49′52″N 86°37′29″W	Greenville	
2	Buell-Stallings-Stewart House	Buell-Stallings-Stewart House	September 4, 1986 (#86001752)	205 Ft. Dale St. 31°49′51″N 86°37′28″W	Greenville	
3	Butler Chapel A.M.E. Zion Church	Butler Chapel A.M.E. Zion Church	September 4, 1986 (#86001755)	407 Oglesby; 31°49′25″N 86°37′30″W	Greenville	
4	Commerce Street Residential Historic District	Commerce Street Residential Historic District	August 28, 1986 (#86001967)	206, 212, 218, and 301 E. Commerce St. 31°49′46″N 86°37′18″W	Greenville	
5	Confederate Park	Confederate Park	September 4, 1986 (#86001791)	E. Commerce St. 31°49′45″N 86°37′23″W	Greenville	
6	Dickenson House	Dickenson House	September 4, 1986 (#86001794)	537 S. Conecuh St. 31°49′11″N 86°36′56″W	Greenville	
7	East Commerce Street Historic District	East Commerce Street Historic District	November 4, 1986 (#86001966)	Roughly bounded by Cedar, Chestnut, Commerce, and Hickory Sts. 31°49′47″N 86°37′08″W	Greenville	
8	Evens-McMullan House	Evens-McMullan House	September 4, 1986 (#86001797)	303 Bolling St. 31°49′36″N 86°37′40″W	Greenville	
9	First Baptist Church	First Baptist Church	September 4, 1986 (#86001799)	707 South St. 31°49′51″N 86°38′07″W	Greenville	
10	First Presbyterian Church	First Presbyterian Church	September 4, 1986 (#86001801)	215 E. Commerce St. 31°49′48″N 86°37′18″W	Greenville	
11	Fort Dale-College Street Historic District	Fort Dale-College Street Historic District	August 28, 1986 (#86001974)	Roughly bounded by Ft. Dale, Hamilton, and N. College Sts. 31°50′04″N 86°37′50″W	Greenville	
12	Gaston-Perdue House	Gaston-Perdue House	September 4, 1986 (#86001803)	111 Cedar St. 31°49′51″N 86°37′23″W	Greenville	
13	Graydon House	Graydon House	September 4, 1986 (#86001805)	507 Cedar St. 31°49′49″N 86°37′09″W	Greenville	
14	Greenville City Hall	Greenville City Hall	November 4, 1986 (#86001807)	E. Commerce St. 31°49′48″N 86°37′22″W	Greenville	
15	Greenville Public School Complex	Greenville Public School Complex	September 4, 1986 (#86001811)	101 Butler Circle; 31°50′01″N 86°37′31″W	Greenville	
16	Hawthorne-Cowart House	Hawthorne-Cowart House	September 4, 1986 (#86001853)	319 Bolling St. 31°49′34″N 86°37′44″W	Greenville	
17	Hinson House	Hinson House	September 4, 1986 (#86001854)	208 Oliver St. 31°49′52″N 86°37′29″W	Greenville	Demolished as of March 2008
18	House at 308 South Street	House at 308 South Street	September 4, 1986 (#86001856)	308 South St. 31°49′49″N 86°37′28″W	Greenville	Demolished as of March 2008
19	John W. Howard House and Outbuildings	John W. Howard House and Outbuildings	September 4, 1992 (#92001090)	State Route 10E; 31°44′59″N 86°27′32″W	Greenville	
20	King Street Historic District	King Street Historic District	August 28, 1986 (#86001971)	Roughly bounded by W. Commerce, Oliver, Milner, and King Sts. 31°49′44″N 86°37′48″W	Greenville	
21	Lane-Kendrick-Sherling House	Lane-Kendrick-Sherling House	September 4, 1986 (#86001858)	109 Ft. Dale St. 31°49′50″N 86°37′28″W	Greenville	
22	Little-Stabler House	Little-Stabler House	November 4, 1986 (#86001861)	710 Ft. Dale St. 31°50′17″N 86°38′00″W	Greenville	
23	McMullan-Skinner House	McMullan-Skinner House	September 4, 1986 (#86001865)	204 Oliver St. 31°49′51″N 86°37′28″W	Greenville	Demolished as of March 2008
24	Oakey Streak Methodist Episcopal Church	Oakey Streak Methodist Episcopal Church	January 4, 1980 (#80000680)	Off State Route 59; 31°33′08″N 86°32′13″W	Greenville	
25	Post Office Historic District	Post Office Historic District	November 4, 1986 (#86001968)	100-115 W. Commerce and 101 E. Commerce Sts. 31°49′47″N 86°37′28″W	Greenville	
26	South Greenville Historic District	South Greenville Historic District	August 28, 1986 (#86001965)	Roughly bounded by Walnut, S. Conecuh, Parmer, and Church and Harrison and Caldwell Sts. 31°49′39″N 86°37′20″W	Greenville	
27	South Street Historic District	South Street Historic District	August 28, 1986 (#86001972)	Roughly bounded by South, Oliver, and McKenzie Sts. 31°49′52″N 86°37′48″W	Greenville	
28	Theological Building-A.M.E. Zion Theological Institute	Theological Building-A.M.E. Zion Theological Institute	September 4, 1986 (#86001867)	E. Conecuh St. 31°48′54″N 86°36′48″W	Greenville	Demolished as of April 2014
29	Ward Nicholson Corner Store	Ward Nicholson Corner Store	November 4, 1986 (#86001870)	219 W. Parmer; 31°49′25″N 86°37′36″W	Greenville	
30	West Commerce Street Historic District	West Commerce Street Historic District	August 28, 1986 (#86001970)	Roughly bounded by W. Commerce, Bolling, and Milner Sts., and the former Louisville and Nashville railroad line 31°49′46″N 86°37′39″W	Greenville	
31	Wright-Kilgore House	Wright-Kilgore House	September 4, 1986 (#86001873)	808 Walnut St. 31°49′43″N 86°36′59″W	Greenville	

== See also ==
- List of National Historic Landmarks in Alabama
- National Register of Historic Places listings in Alabama
