= Butler Chapel A.M.E. Zion Church =

Butler Chapel A.M.E. Zion Church may refer to:

- Butler Chapel A.M.E. Zion Church (Greenville, Alabama)
- Butler Chapel A.M.E. Zion Church (Tuskegee, Alabama)
