= South Street Historic District =

South Street Historic District can refer to:

- South Street Historic District (Greenville, Alabama)
- South Street Historic District (Brockton, Massachusetts)
- South Street Historic District (Gorham, Maine)
- South Street Historic District (Kalamazoo, Michigan)
- South Street Historic District (Cuba, New York)
- South Street Historic District (Pawtucket, Rhode Island)
