= Confederate Park =

Confederate Park may refer to:

- Confederate Park, in Demopolis, Alabama, now known as Demopolis Town Square, listed on the National Register of Historic Places in Marengo County, Alabama
- Confederate Park (Greenville, Alabama), listed on the National Register of Historic Places in Butler County, Alabama
- Confederate Park (Jacksonville, Florida), a public park in Jacksonville, Florida

== See also ==
- Confederate Monument
