= Eurosius Parker =

American gridiron football player (born 1976)

No. 21
- Positions: Cornerback, return specialist

Personal information
- Born: June 16, 1976 (age 50); Greenville, Alabama, U.S.
- Listed height: 5 ft 11 in (1.80 m)
- Listed weight: 190 lb (86 kg)

Career information
- High school: Greenville
- College: Jacksonville State (1994–1998)
- NFL draft: 1999: undrafted

Career history
- Hamilton Tiger-Cats (1999–2000)

Awards and highlights
- Grey Cup champion (1999); First-team All-SLC (1998) (Note: Selected as return specialist); Second-team All-SLC (1998)

Career CFL statistics
- Games played: 8
- Return yards: 528
- Tackles: 19
- Stats at CFL.ca
- Stats at ArenaFan.com

Eurosius M. Parker (born June 16, 1976) is an American former professional football cornerback and return specialist who played for the Hamilton Tiger-Cats of the Canadian Football League (CFL). He played college football for the Jacksonville State Gamecocks.

== Early life ==
Parker was born on June 16, 1976, in Greenville, Alabama. He attended Greenville High School in Greenville where as a senior, he had a state-leading 13 interceptions and 446 return yards with four touchdowns.

== College career ==
Parker played college football for the Jacksonville State Gamecocks from 1994 to 1998 and was a four-year letterman from 1995 to 1998. After he redshirted his first year, he had 153 solo tackles, 13 interceptions, 29 pass break ups, six forced fumbles and eight fumble recoveries. In 1999, Parker earned first-team All-SLC honors as a return specialist whilst adding second-team All-SLC as a cornerback.

== Professional career ==
After going undrafted in the 1999 NFL draft, Freeman signed with the Hamilton Tiger-Cats as an undrafted free agent. On July 16, he was placed on the injury list after suffering a knee injury, ending his season. Freeman played in right games, recording 19 tackles and 528 return yards. On June 13, 2003, Freeman was released after failing a physical.
