= Hawthorne–Cowart House =

- U.S. National Register of Historic Places
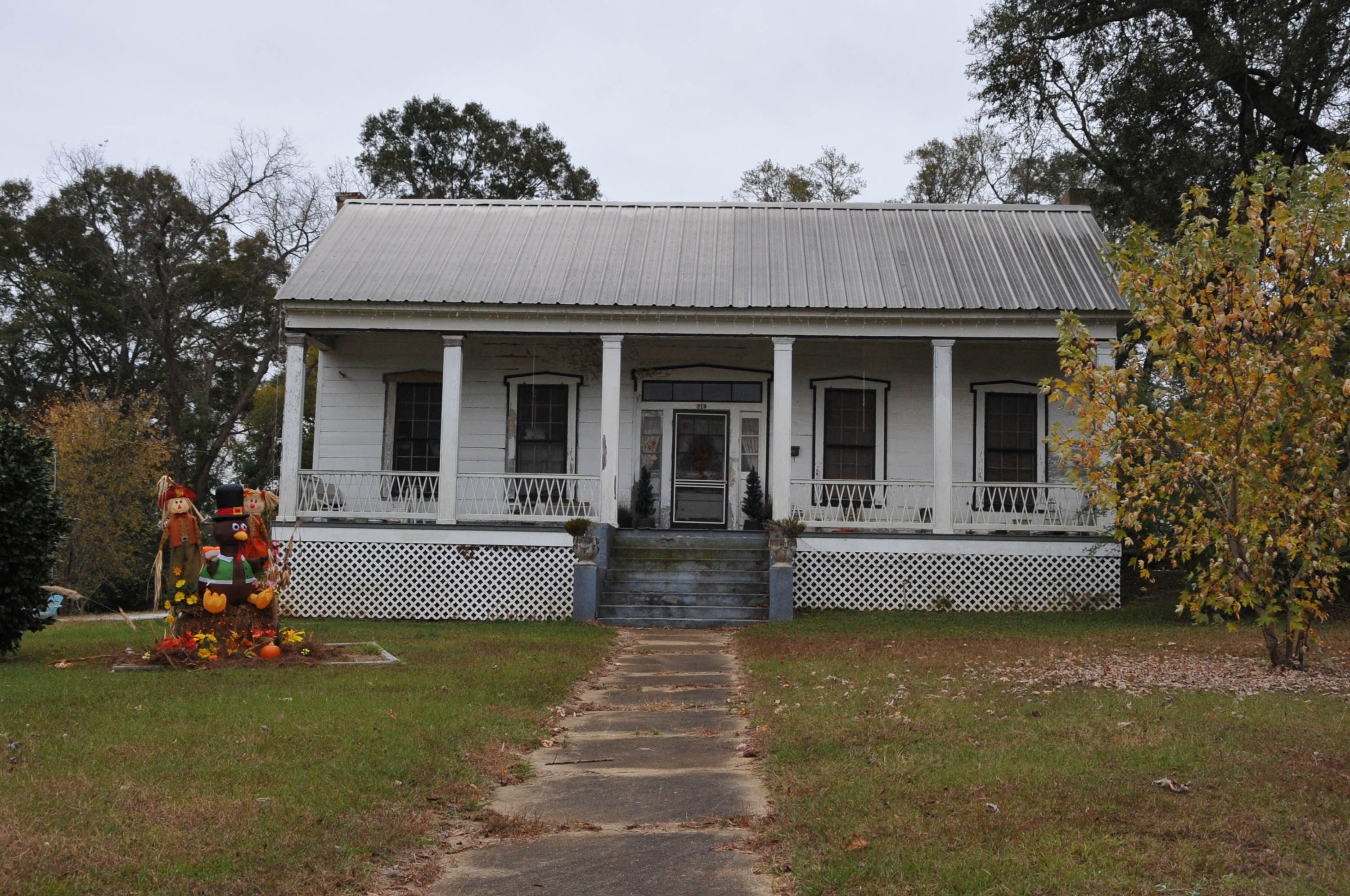
- The house in May 2008
- Interactive map of Hawthorne–Cowart House
- Location: 319 Bolling St., Greenville, Alabama
- Built: circa 1850
- Architectural style: Vernacular
- MPS: Greenville MRA
- NRHP reference No.: 86001853
- Added to NRHP: September 4, 1986

The Hawthorne–Cowart House is a historic residence in Greenville, Alabama, United States. It was built in the 1850s and purchased by A. J. Hawthorne in the early 1870s. It was sold to S. D. Cowart in 1901. The house is a one-story Vernacular building, constructed of wood and resting on brick piers. It has a gable roof with a cross-gable rear ell. The façade is five bays wide, and has a recessed porch supported by square columns. The interior has a center-hall plan with simple Greek Revival mantels and other details.

The house was listed on the National Register of Historic Places in 1986.
