= Little–Stabler House =

- U.S. National Register of Historic Places
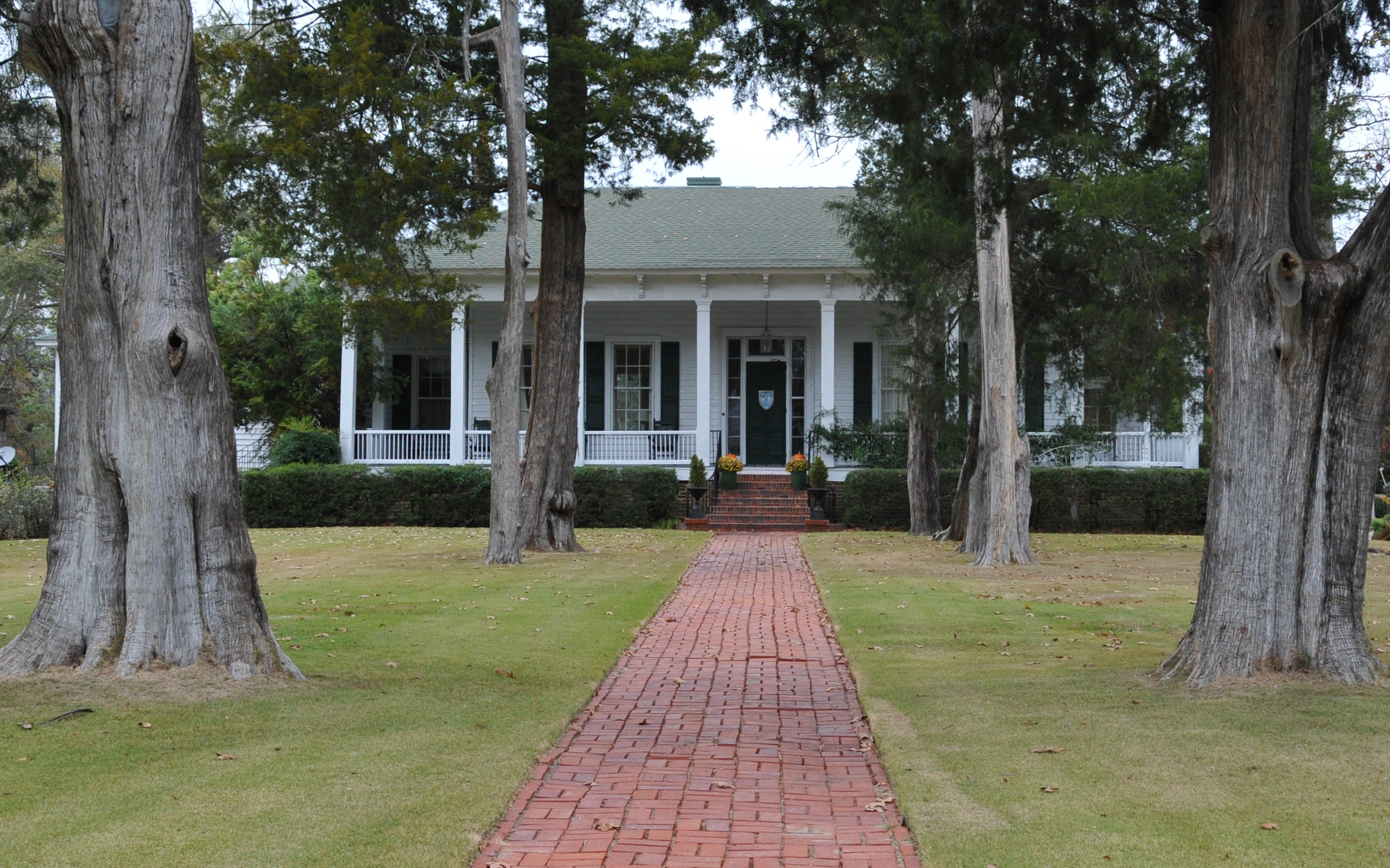
- The house in May 2008
- Interactive map of Little–Stabler House
- Location: 710 Ft. Dale St., Greenville, Alabama
- Built: 1845
- Architectural style: Greek Revival
- NRHP reference No.: 86001861
- Added to NRHP: September 4, 1986

The Little–Stabler House is a historic residence in Greenville, Alabama, United States. It was built in 1845 as part of a 800-acre (320 ha) plantation known as the Wimberly estate. J. G. Little purchased the house in the late 1800s, and Vernon Stabler purchased it in 1937. The house is a one-story Greek Revival building, with a hipped roof and wraparound recessed porch. The bracketed eaves show Italianate influence on the design. The original interior was a double-pile center-hall plan. Several rooms were added to the rear of the house, as well as a porte-cochère, in a 1940s–1950s remodel.

The house was listed on the National Register of Historic Places in 1986.
