= West Commerce Street Historic District (Greenville, Alabama) =

- U.S. National Register of Historic Places
- U.S. Historic district
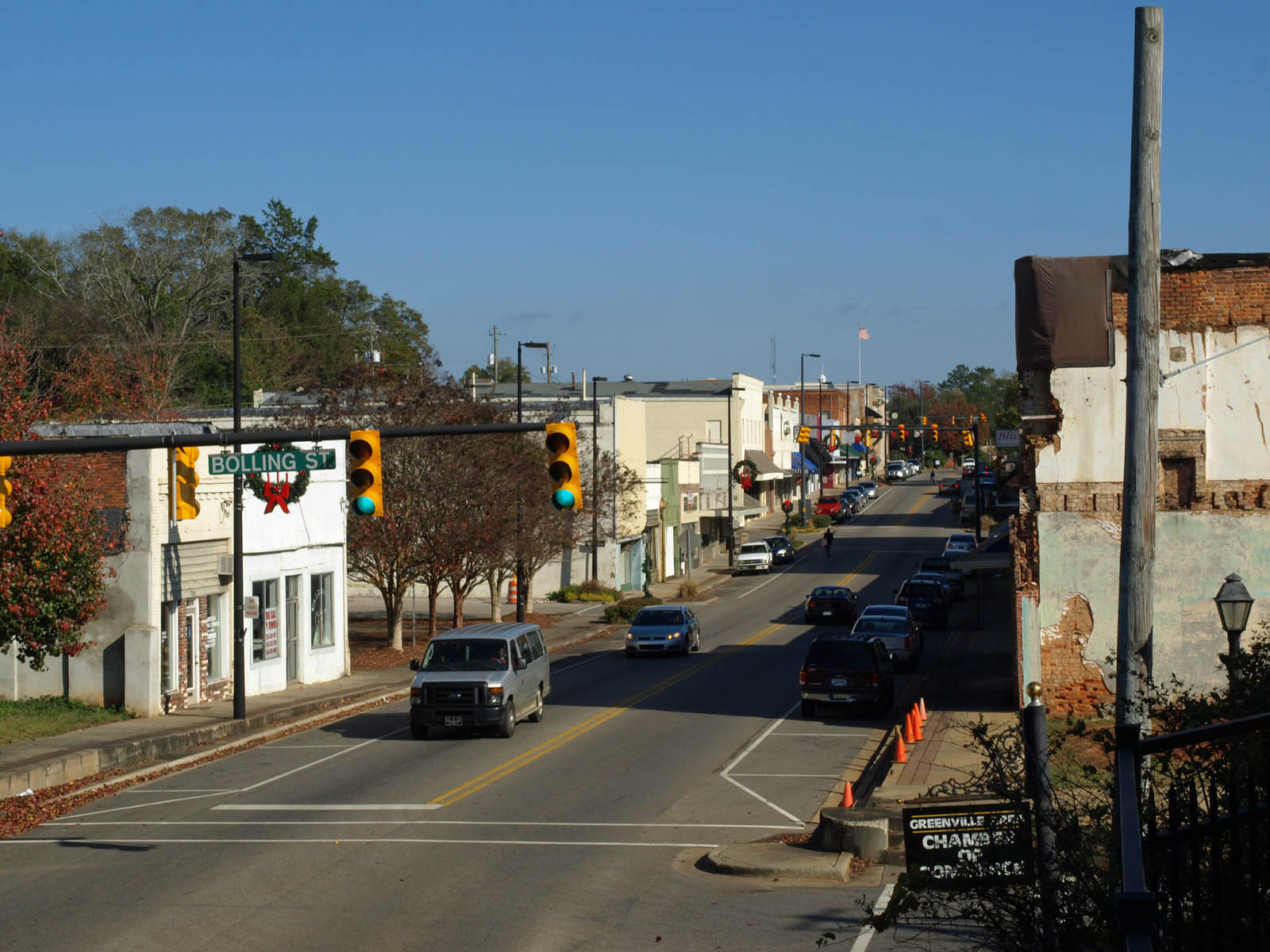
- West Commerce Street in November 2013
- Interactive map of West Commerce Street Historic District
- Location: Roughly bounded by W. Commerce, Oliver, Milner, and King Sts., Greenville, Alabama
- Built: 1870–1920
- NRHP reference No.: 86001970
- Added to NRHP: August 28, 1986

The West Commerce Street Historic District is a historic district in Greenville, Alabama, United States. The district began to develop in the 1850s with the coming of the railroad to Greenville with a collection of frame commercial buildings near the depot, none of which survive. The first brick buildings were constructed in the 1870s and 1880s to house offices and stores. Other commercial buildings continued to be built through the 1920s, most in simple style but some with Victorian details. The current passenger depot was built in 1910 in Spanish Revival style.

The district was listed on the National Register of Historic Places in 1986.
