= Dickenson House =

Historic house in Alabama, United States

- U.S. National Register of Historic Places
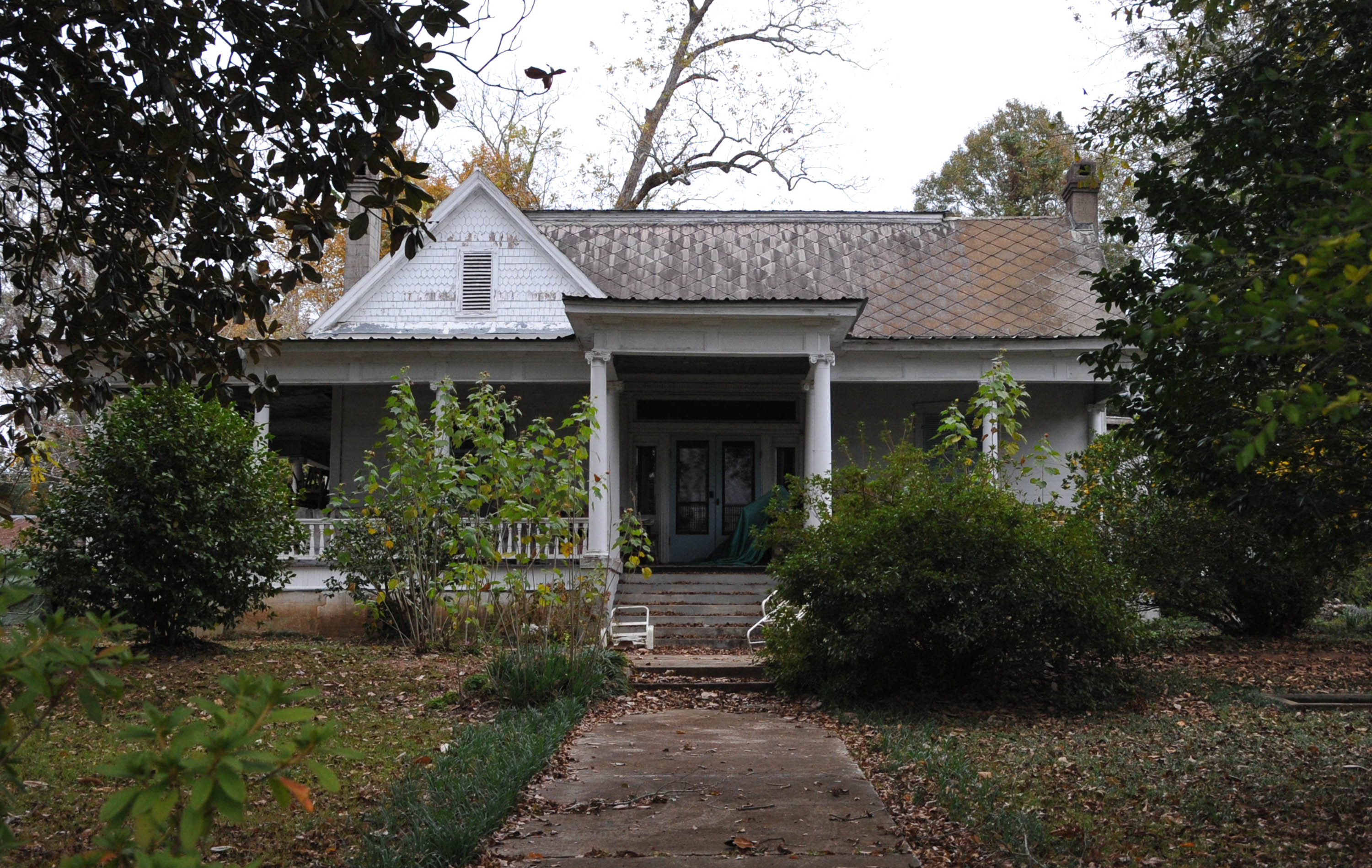
- The house in May 2008

- Location within Alabama Location within the United States
- Location: 537 S. Conecuh St., Greenville, Alabama
- Coordinates: 31°49′11″N 86°36′56″W
- Area: 1.8 acres (0.73 ha)
- Built: 1890
- MPS: Greenville MRA
- NRHP reference No.: 86001794
- Added to NRHP: September 4, 1986

The Dickenson House is a historic residence in Greenville, Alabama, United States. The house is an example of South Alabama vernacular architecture, with a truncated pyramidal roof topped with a flat platform. The house has a wrap-around front porch supported by Ionic columns. A cross-gable dormer with a vent adorns the left side of the façade. The main entry has Eastlake detailing, a transom, and sidelights. The interior features Queen Anne details including horizontally-paneled doors and paneled wainscoting.

The house was listed on the National Register of Historic Places in 1986.
