= South Greenville Historic District =

- U.S. National Register of Historic Places
- U.S. Historic district
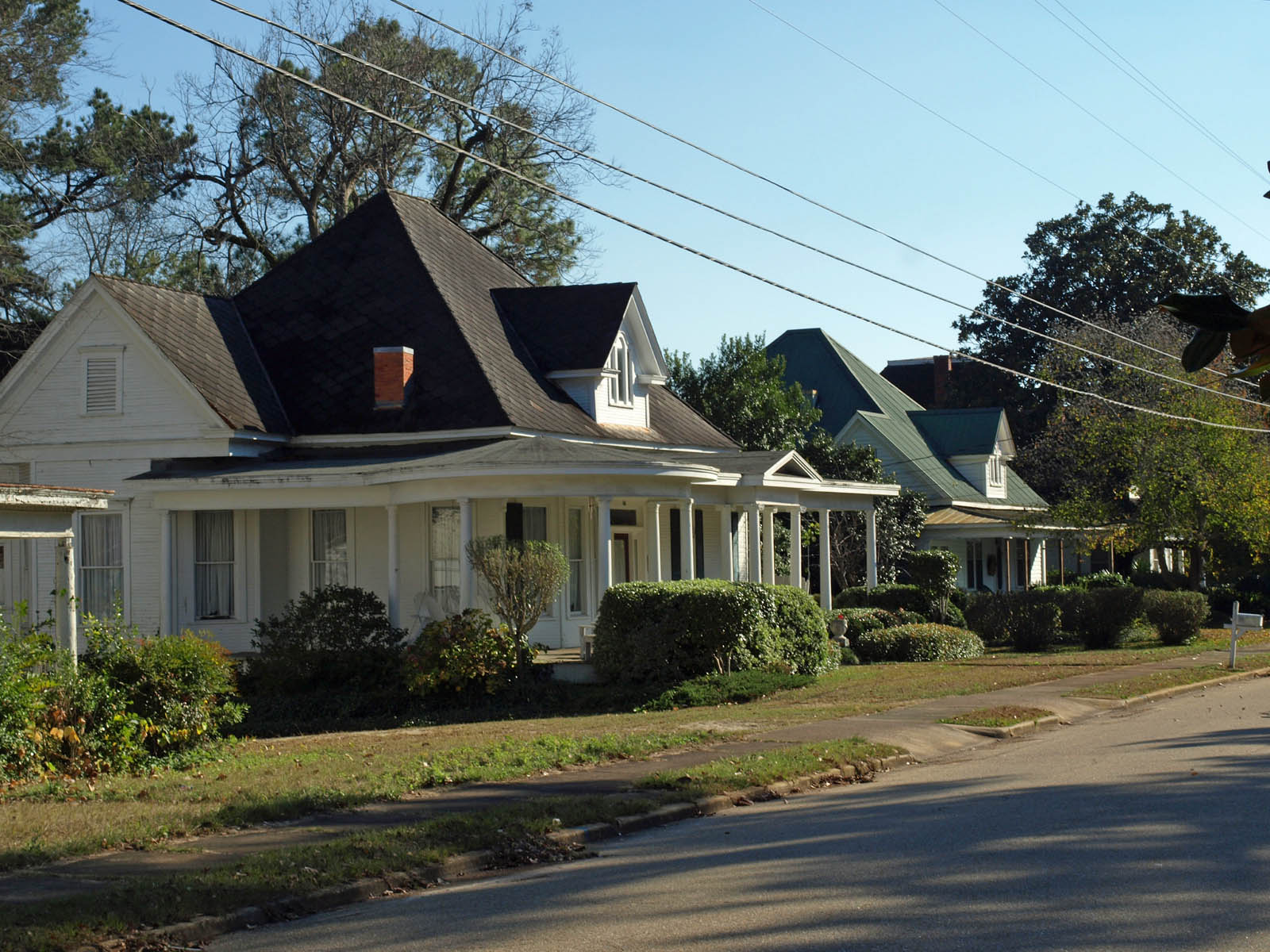
- Houses on Park Street in November 2013
- Interactive map of South Greenville Historic District
- Location: Roughly bounded by Walnut, S. Conecuh, Parmer, and Church and Harrison and Caldwell Sts., Greenville, Alabama
- Built: 1850–1936
- NRHP reference No.: 86001965
- Added to NRHP: August 28, 1986

The South Greenville Historic District is a historic district in Greenville, Alabama, United States. The district is primarily residential, and extends south from the city's main commercial area. The area began to develop in the 1850s, after the railroad was built through the town. The earliest houses were built by merchants and tradesmen, many in Greek Revival and Vernacular styles. Development slowed following the Civil War, but picked up in the economic boom of the 1880s, with merchants and professionals building modest houses including many Victorian cottages. Two churches were also built: First Methodist church in the early 1880s, and St. Thomas Episcopal in 1896. While development was mostly complete by 1910, infill bungalows continued to be built in the early 20th century.

The district was listed on the National Register of Historic Places in 1986.
