= Gaston-Perdue House =

Historic house in Alabama, United States

- U.S. National Register of Historic Places
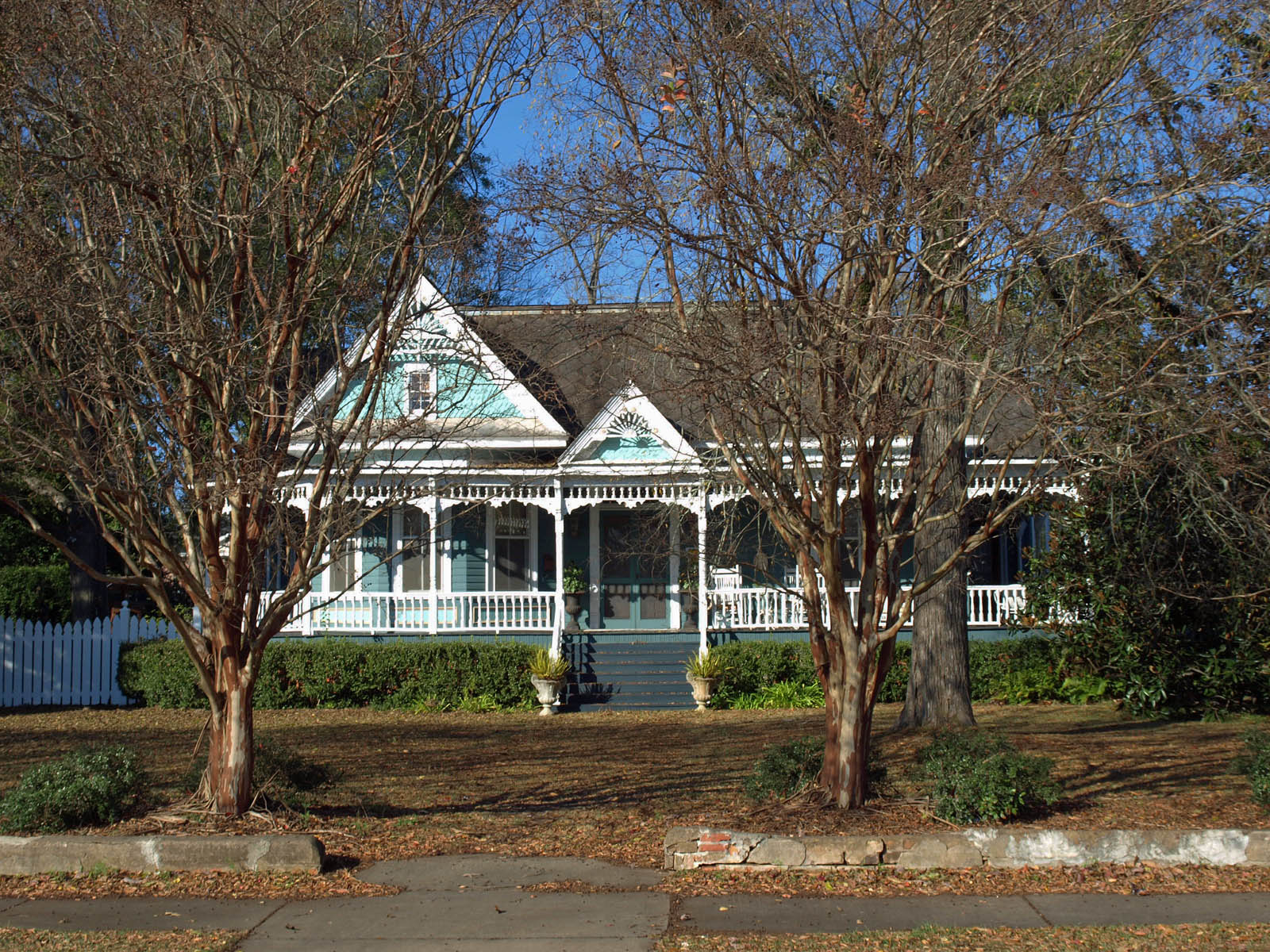
- The house in November 2013

- Location within Alabama Location within the United States
- Location: 111 Cedar St., Greenville, Alabama
- Coordinates: 31°49′51″N 86°37′23″W
- Area: less than one acre
- Built: 1895
- Architectural style: Queen Anne
- MPS: Greenville MRA
- NRHP reference No.: 86001803
- Added to NRHP: September 4, 1986

The Gaston-Perdue House is a historic residence in Greenville, Alabama, United States. The house was built in 1895 by Butler County probate judge Zell Gaston. In 1903, following his term, Gaston moved to Birmingham and sold the house to physician J. L. Perdue.

The house is a classic example of Queen Anne architecture, with a hip roof with several gable extensions, each with sunburst-patterned spindlework. A porch wraps around three sides of the house and has thin columns with Eastlake brackets and a matching balustrade. The interior has a central hall with two rooms on each side. Interior woodwork includes tongue-and-groove paneling, Queen Anne fireplace mantels, and some architraves with bracketed cornices.

The house was listed on the National Register of Historic Places in 1986.
