= Evens-McMullan House =

Historic house in Alabama, United States

- Evens–McMullan House
- U.S. National Register of Historic Places
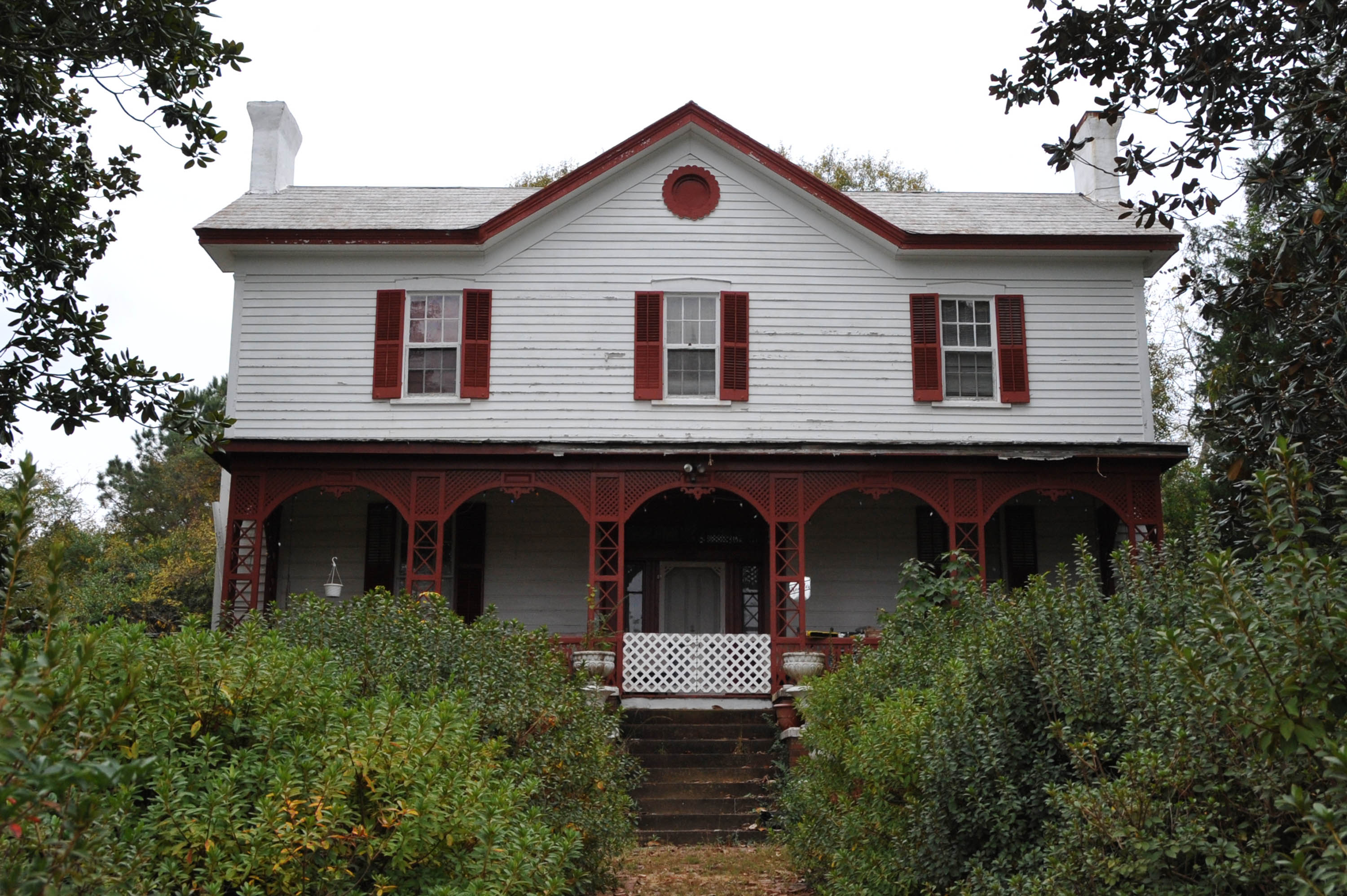
- The house in May 2008

- Location within Alabama Location within the United States
- Location: 303 Bolling St., Greenville, Alabama
- Coordinates: 31°49′36″N 86°37′40″W
- Area: 1 acre (0.40 ha)
- Built: Late 1860s
- Architectural style: I-House
- MPS: Greenville MRA
- NRHP reference No.: 86001797
- Added to NRHP: September 4, 1986

The Evens-McMullan House (also known as Magnolia Manor) is a historic residence in Greenville, Alabama, United States. It was built in the late 1860s by Holden Evens, a lumberman who specially selected the timber used in its construction. It was purchased in 1891 by Frank McMullen, a Greenville jeweler.

The house is two stories and follows the basic I-house form, but with a front-facing gable and a pair of one-story wings off the rear. The front porch has Victorian latticed supports and spandrels. The interior features a curved staircase in the entry hall.

The house was listed on the National Register of Historic Places in 1986.
