= WQZX =

- Greenville, Alabama; United States
- Frequency: 94.3 MHz
- Branding: Q94

Programming
- Format: Country
- Affiliations: ABC Radio

Ownership
- Owner: Haynes Broadcasting, Inc.

History
- First air date: 1984

Technical information
- Licensing authority: FCC
- Facility ID: 26479
- Class: A
- ERP: 3,900 watts
- HAAT: 125.0 meters
- Transmitter coordinates: 31°54′40″N 86°36′19″W

Links
- Public license information: Public file; LMS
- Website: http://www.q94.net

WQZX (94.3 FM, "Q94") is a radio station broadcasting a country music format. Licensed to Greenville, Alabama, United States. The station is currently owned by Haynes Broadcasting, Inc. and features programming from ABC Radio.
