= Commerce Street Residential Historic District =

Historic district in Alabama, United States

- U.S. National Register of Historic Places
- U.S. Historic district
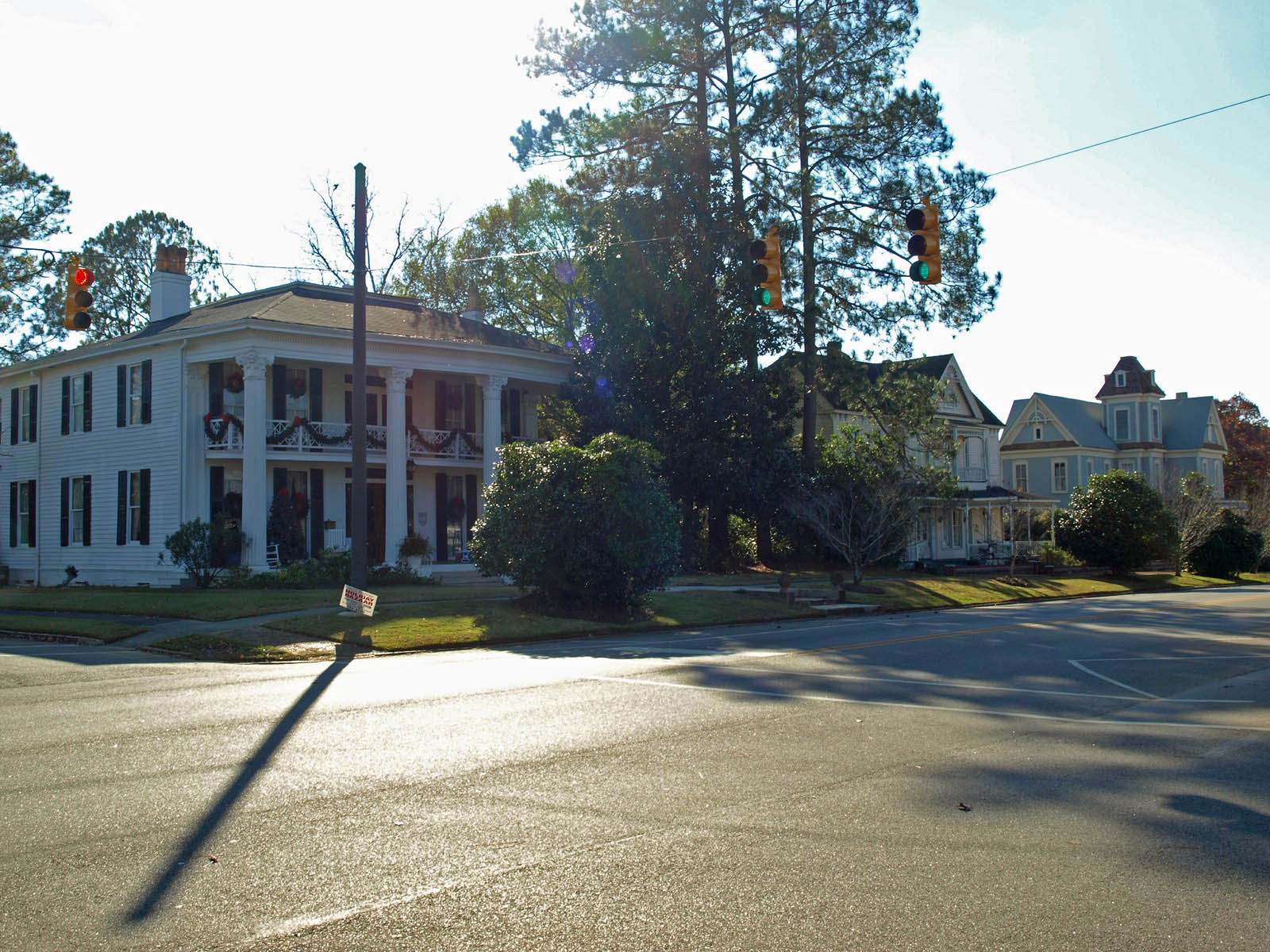
- Houses in the district in November 2013

- Location within Alabama Location within the United States
- Location: 206, 212, 218, 301 E. Commerce St., Greenville, Alabama
- Coordinates: 31°49′46″N 86°37′18″W
- Area: 1.8 acres (0.73 ha)
- Architectural style: Greek Revival, Italianate, Queen Anne
- MPS: Greenville MRA
- NRHP reference No.: 86001967
- Added to NRHP: August 28, 1986

The Commerce Street Residential Historic District is a historic district in Greenville, Alabama, United States. The district consists of four houses along Commerce Street, constructed between 1846 and 1895. They represent the final and last remaining residential construction on the town's main street.

The Steiner-Kendrick House was built in 1846 in Greek Revival style, and features a pyramidal roof with a front-facing gable which features a Palladian window. Its interior was remodeled with Queen Anne details around 1900. The Henry House was built in 1854 in less restrained Greek Revival style. The façade is dominated by four double-height Corinthian columns supporting the recessed portico. A second-story veranda stretches across the front of the house. The Martin House was built in 1895, incorporating an older cottage that had been built in 1853. The Italianate house has a mansard-esque gable roof and a wraparound hip roofed porch. The eaves, gable ends, and porch all feature intricate Stick-Eastlake woodwork. The Perry House, also built in 1895, has Italianate and Victorian influences. It has a central, squared belvedere next to a projecting cross-gable end bay with a semicircular bay window on the ground floor.

The district was listed on the National Register of Historic Places in 1986.

== Gallery ==
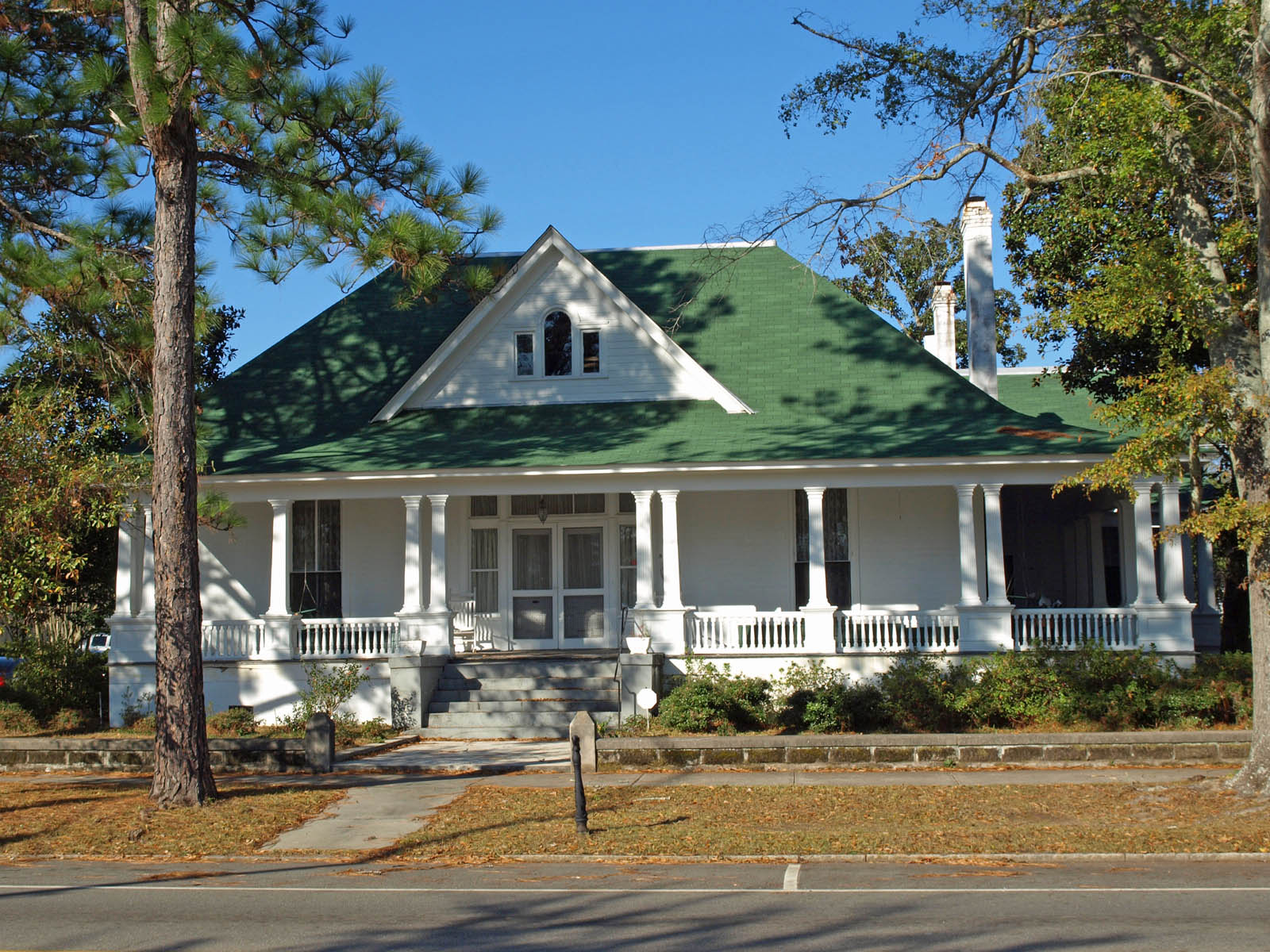
Steiner-Kendrick House, built 1846

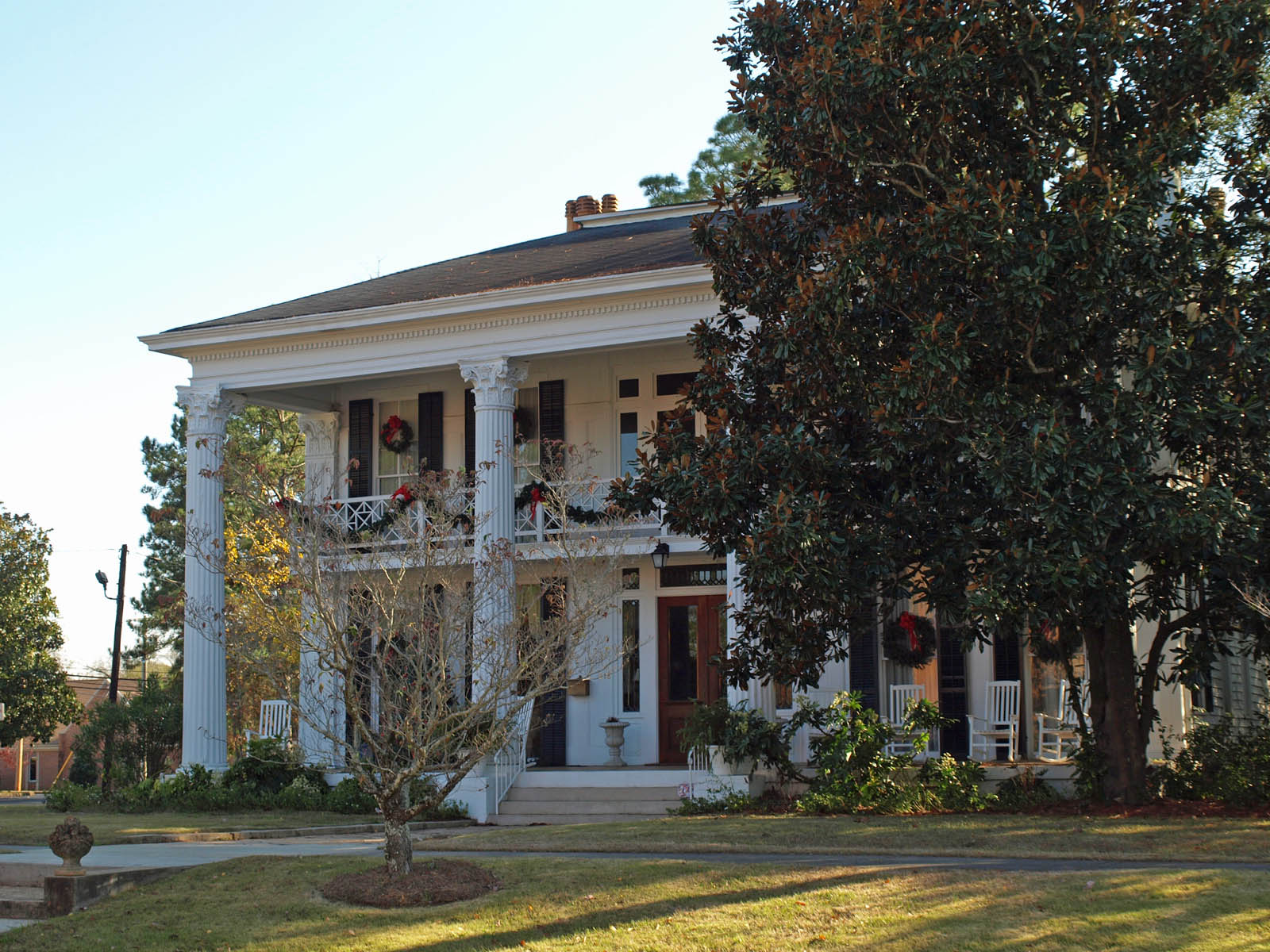
Henry House, built 1857

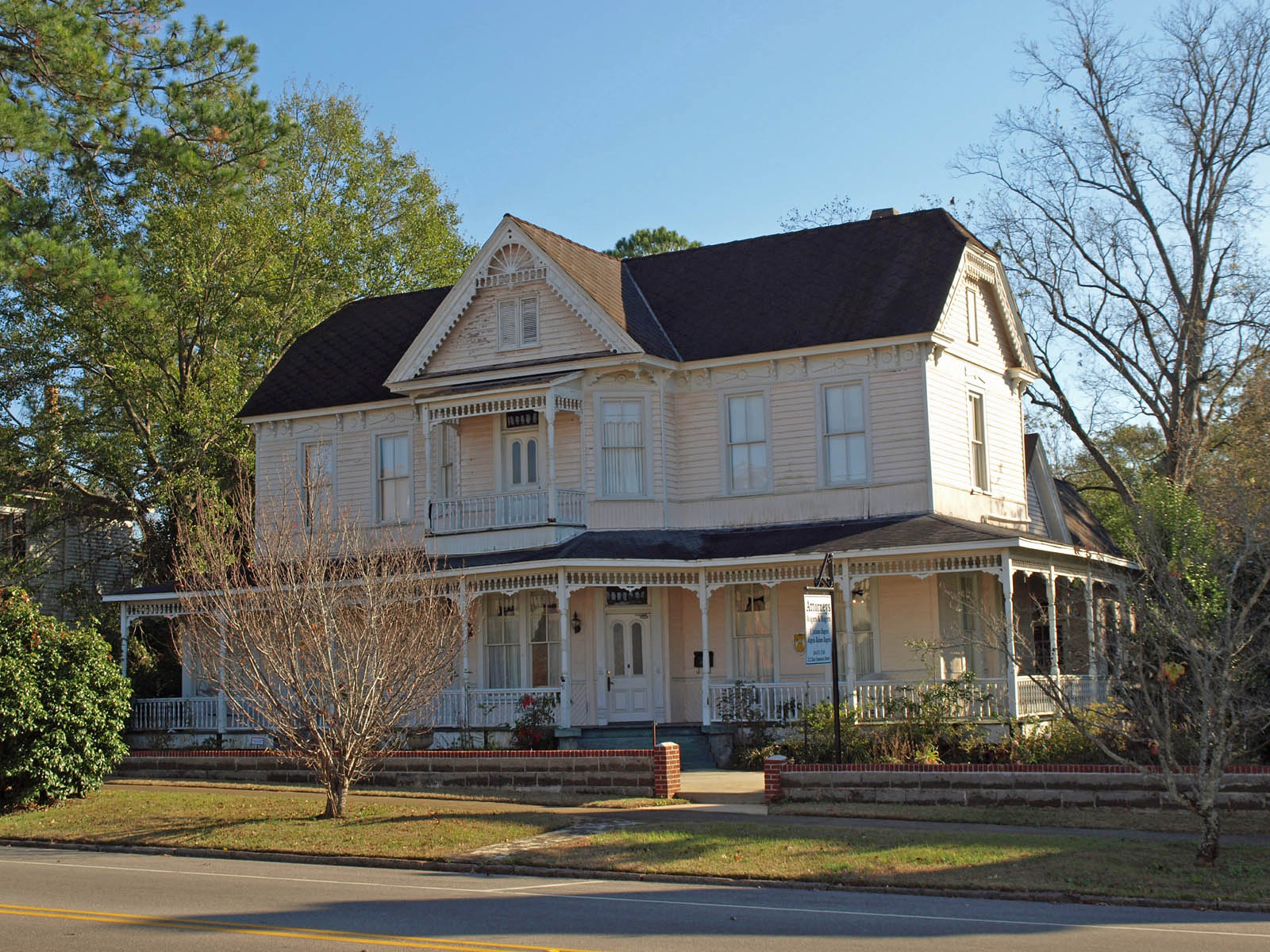
Martin House, built 1895

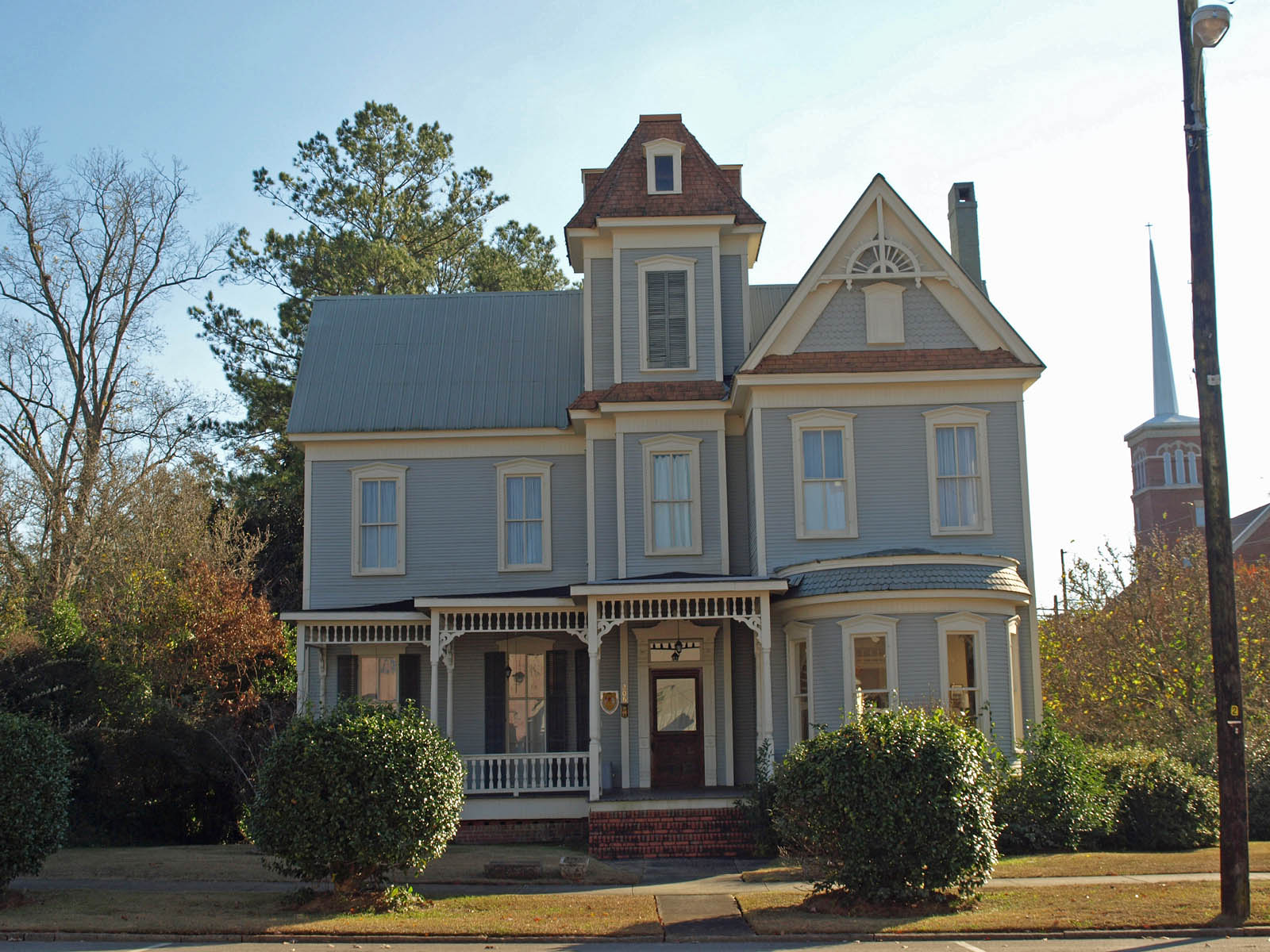
Perry House, built 1895
