= Leon Crenshaw =

American football player (1943–2008)

No. 81, 70, 74
- Position: Defensive tackle

Personal information
- Born: July 14, 1943; Greenville, Alabama, U.S.
- Died: August 22, 2008 (aged 65); Columbus, Georgia, U.S.
- Listed height: 6 ft 7 in (2.01 m)
- Listed weight: 280 lb (127 kg)

Career information
- High school: Hooper City (Birmingham, Alabama)
- College: Tuskegee (1961-1964)
- NFL draft: 1965: undrafted

Career history
- Dallas Cowboys (1965)*; Rhode Island Indians (1965); Boston Patriots (1966)*; Lowell Giants (1966-1967); Green Bay Packers (1967–1968); Atlanta Falcons (1969)*; Washington Redskins (1969)*
- * Offseason or practice squad member only

Career NFL statistics
- Sacks: 0.5
- Stats at Pro Football Reference

Leon Crenshaw (July 14, 1943 − August 22, 2008) was a defensive tackle in the National Football League.

== Biography ==
Crenshaw was born in Greenville, Alabama.

== Career ==
Crenshaw played with the Green Bay Packers during the 1968 NFL season. He played at the collegiate level at Tuskegee University.
