= Lane–Kendrick–Sherling House =

- U.S. National Register of Historic Places
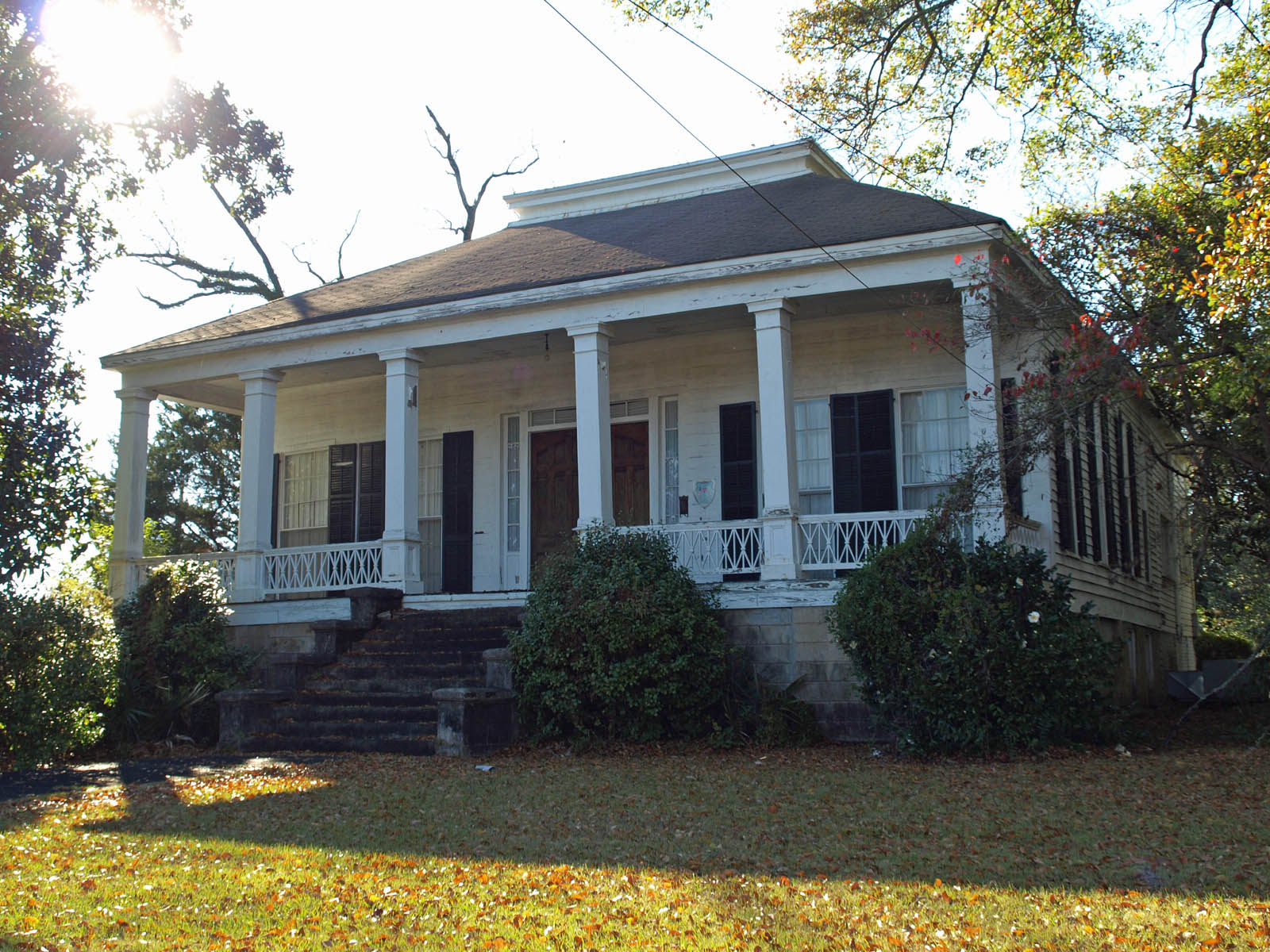
- The house in November 2013
- Interactive map of Lane–Kendrick–Sherling House
- Location: 109 Ft. Dale St., Greenville, Alabama
- Built: circa 1850
- Architectural style: Greek Revival
- NRHP reference No.: 86001858
- Added to NRHP: September 4, 1986

The Lane–Kendrick–Sherling House is a historic residence in Greenville, Alabama, United States. Built around 1850, the house had several owners before being purchased by attorney and later probate judge L. M. Lane. Lane owned the house until 1921, when it was passed to his daughter, Katie Kendrick, and later to her daughter, Mrs. Dan Sherling. The house is a single story, U-shaped Greek Revival building, with a hipped roof topped by a platform. The five-bay façade has pairs of nine-over-nine sash windows flanking a double entrance door with sidelights and a transom. While the interior plan and floors are original, most of the detailing was added in the 1950s, salvaged from Victorian houses in Montgomery, Mobile, and Birmingham.

The house was listed on the National Register of Historic Places in 1986.
