= W.S. Blackwell House =

Historic house in Alabama, United States

- W. S. Blackwell House
- U.S. National Register of Historic Places
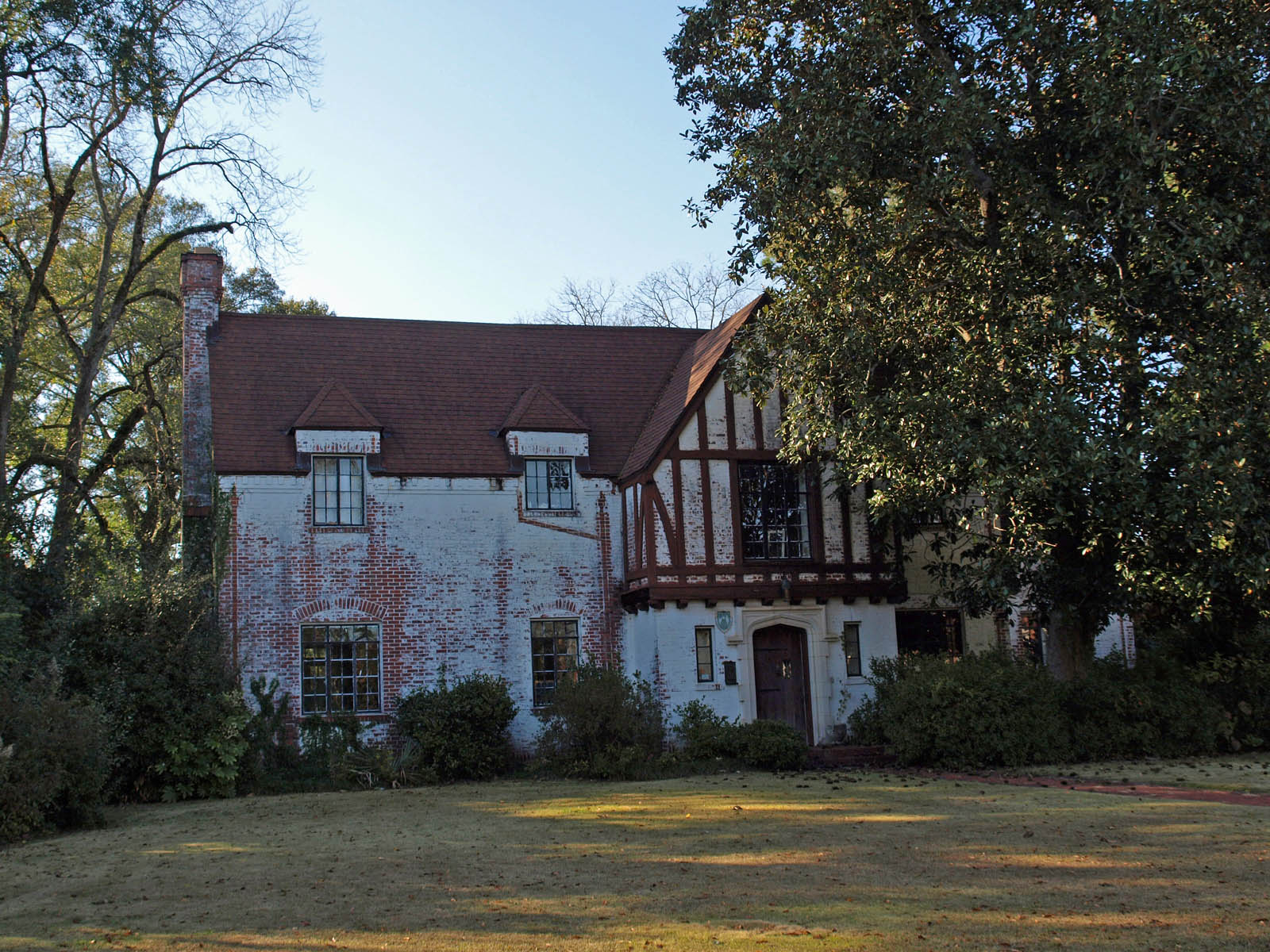
- The house in November 2013

- Location within Alabama Location within the United States
- Location: 211 Ft. Dale Street, Greenville, Alabama
- Coordinates: 31°49′52″N 86°37′29″W
- Area: less than one acre
- Built: 1930
- Architect: Frank Lockwood Jr.
- Architectural style: Tudor Revival
- MPS: Greenville MRA
- NRHP reference No.: 86001751
- Added to NRHP: September 4, 1986

The W. S. Blackwell House is a historic residence located at 211 Ft. Dale Street in Greenville, Alabama, United States. The house was built around 1930, on land previously occupied by W. S. Blackwell's father-in-law's house, which burned in the 1920s.

== Description and history ==
The brick two-story Tudor Revival style home was designed by Montgomery architect Frank Lockwood, Jr., the son of renowned architect Frank Lockwood. The façade has a projecting, half-timbered front gable with a large multi-light window on the second floor, above the main entrance with a terra cotta surround and arch. On either side of the entrance are casement windows with decorative soldier course brick arches on the ground floor, and windows with dormer tops on the second floor. The interior also feature Tudor details, including a marble arched fireplace mantel in the living room and a cast iron staircase railing with spiral balusters.

The house was listed on the National Register of Historic Places on September 4, 1986.
