= Butler Chapel A.M.E. Zion Church (Greenville, Alabama) =

Historic church in Alabama, United States

- U.S. National Register of Historic Places
- Alabama Register of Landmarks and Heritage
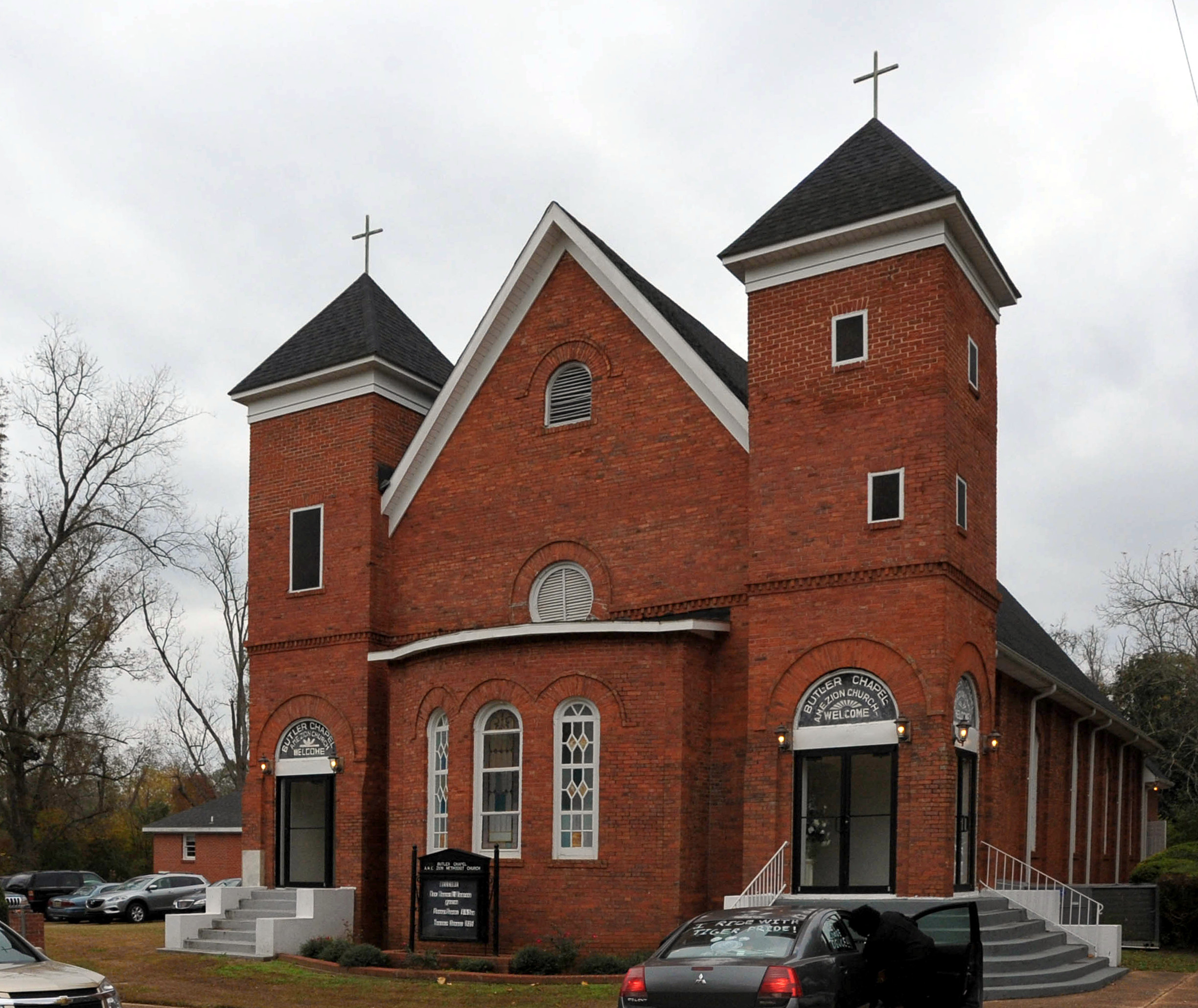

- Location within Alabama Location within the United States
- Location: 407 Oglesby St., Greenville, Alabama
- Coordinates: 31°49′25″N 86°37′30″W
- Area: less than one acre
- Built: 1913
- Architectural style: Late Victorian, High Victorian Eclectic
- MPS: Greenville MRA
- NRHP reference No.: 86001755

Significant dates
- Added to NRHP: September 4, 1986
- Designated ARLH: January 31, 1979

Butler Chapel A.M.E. Zion Church is a historic African Methodist Episcopal Zion Church built in 1913, and located in Greenville, Alabama, United States. It was one of three significant meeting places for African-Americans living in Greenville during the early 20th century.

The building was added to the National Register of Historic Places in 1986.

== History ==
This building was a replacement for the original 1867 church structure which had burned down on April 19, 1911. Butler Chapel had served a wide-ranging role as the neighborhood center of economic and social development for many people, including serving as the first African-American school in the city.
