= Buell–Stallings–Stewart House =

Historic house in Alabama, United States

- U.S. National Register of Historic Places
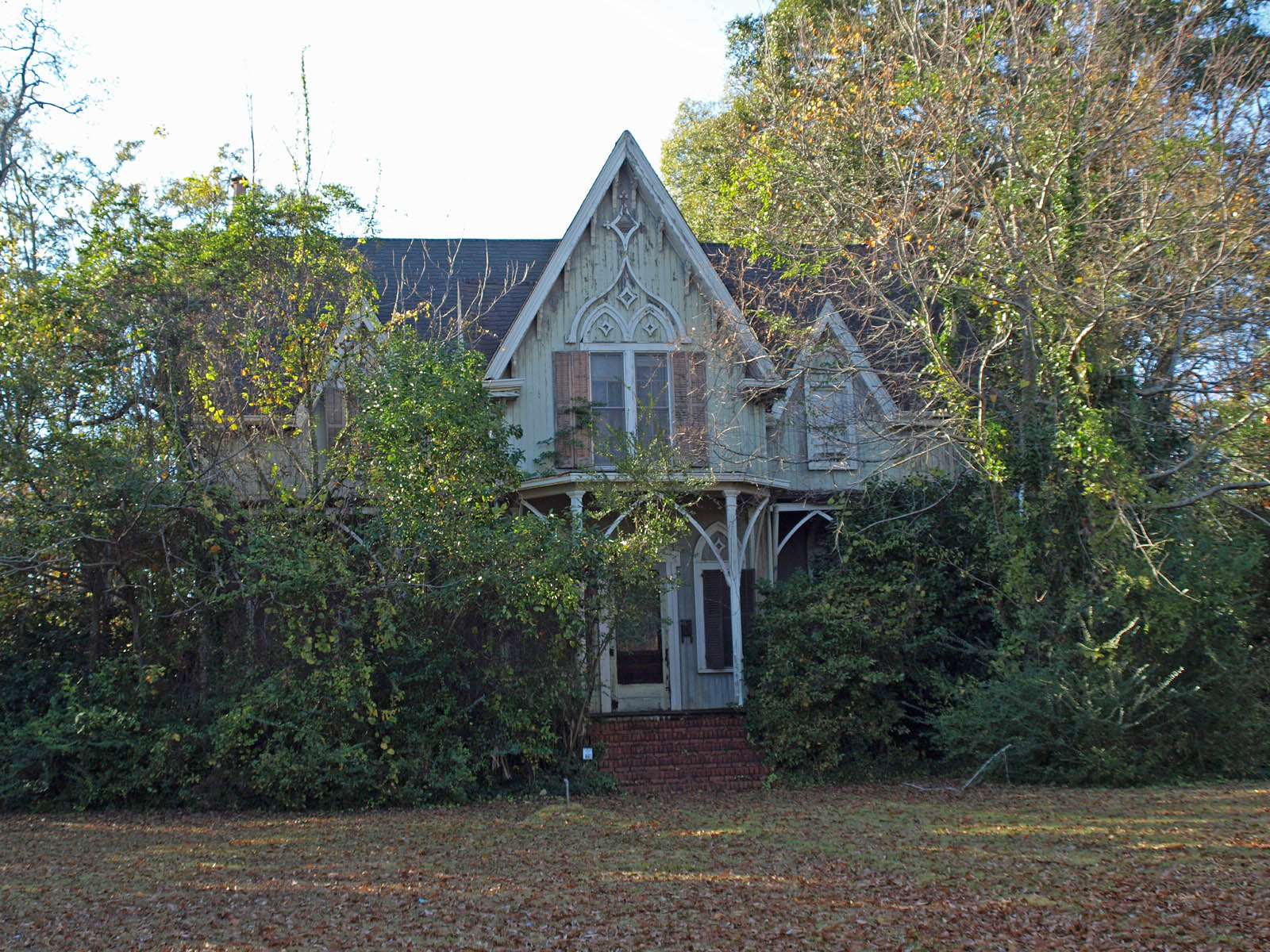
- The house in November 2013

- Location within Alabama Location within the United States
- Location: 205 Fort Dale St., Greenville, Alabama
- Coordinates: 31°49′51″N 86°37′28″W
- Area: less than one acre
- Built: 1874
- Architectural style: Carpenter Gothic
- MPS: Greenville MRA
- NRHP reference No.: 86001752
- Added to NRHP: September 4, 1986

The Buell–Stallings–Stewart House is a historic residence in Greenville, Alabama, United States. The house was built in 1874 by a local lawyer David Buell, who later sold it to U. S. Congressman Jesse F. Stallings. Stallings sold the house to A. Graham Stewart, a local merchant, in 1901. The house is built in a Carpenter Gothic style, rare in Alabama, and features a steeply sloped roof and several sharply pointed gables and dormers. A flat-roofed, octagonal porch projects over the front entry. Each window and door is topped with a decorative Gothic arch molding with a diamond in the middle. The house was listed on the National Register of Historic Places in 1986.
