= Ward Nicholson Corner Store =

- U.S. National Register of Historic Places
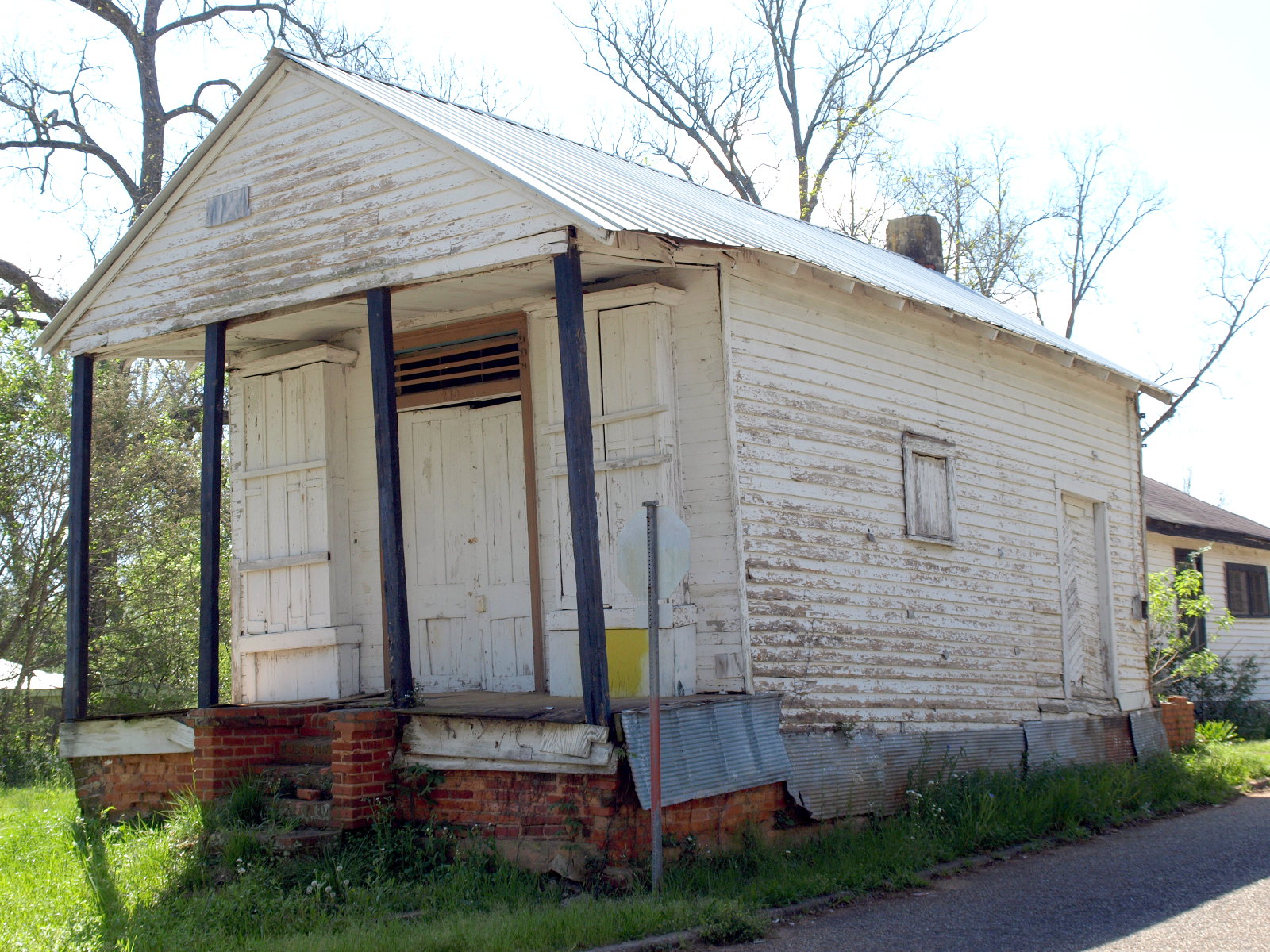
- The building in April 2015
- Interactive map of Ward Nicholson Corner Store
- Location: 219 W. Parmer St., Greenville, Alabama
- Built: circa 1884
- Architectural style: Vernacular
- NRHP reference No.: 86001870
- Added to NRHP: September 4, 1986

The Ward Nicholson Corner Store (also known as Frank Ward's Corner Store) is a historic building in Greenville, Alabama, United States. It was listed on the National Register of Historic Places in 1986.

== History ==
The store was built in 1884 by A.M.E. Zion minister Frank W. Ward. It served as a general store and community gathering place in its predominantly Black neighborhood in the south part of Greenville. Ward operated the store until his death in 1925, when his wife Sallie took over the business until her death in the 1930s. The store continued under the ownership of Nobie Price until the 1960s, when the building was rented out and used as a social center.

== Architecture ==
The store is a folk variant of Greek Revival corner stores that were abundant in the Southern United States in the 19th century. It sits on the corner of its lot, facing the busier east–west street through the neighborhood. The building is a narrow, one-story frame structure with a front-facing gable roof. It sits on brick piers, with the front of the foundation completely faced with brick and incorporating stairs. The entrance is on a recessed porch supported by four square columns, with the door flanked by projecting display windows. Behind the store is a late 19th century house, originally brick but now covered with siding.
