= Graydon House =

Historic house in Alabama, United States

- U.S. National Register of Historic Places
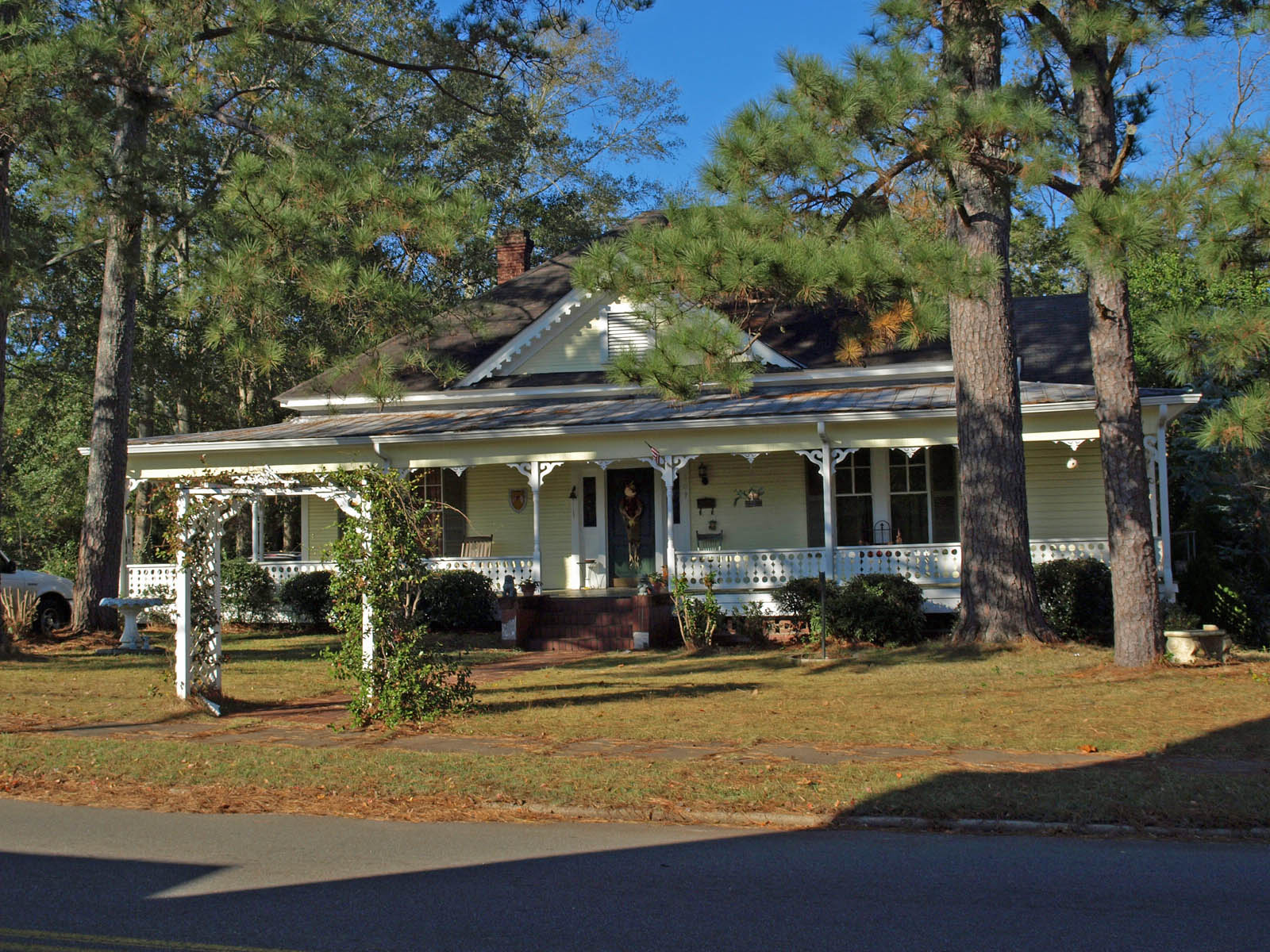
- The house in November 2013

- Location within Alabama Location within the United States
- Location: 507 Cedar St., Greenville, Alabama
- Coordinates: 31°49′49″N 86°37′9″W
- Area: less than one acre
- Built: 1909
- Architectural style: Colonial Revival, Queen Anne
- MPS: Greenville MRA
- NRHP reference No.: 86001805
- Added to NRHP: September 4, 1986

The Graydon House is a historic residence in Greenville, Alabama, United States. The house was built in 1909, and typifies the southern Alabama vernacular house, with a hip roof and wrap-around porch. A gabled dormer is centered on the façade, and the porch has slender columns with elaborate brackets. Decorative woodwork continues inside, including Queen Anne fireplace mantels.

The house was listed on the National Register of Historic Places in 1986.
