= King Street Historic District =

- U.S. National Register of Historic Places
- U.S. Historic district
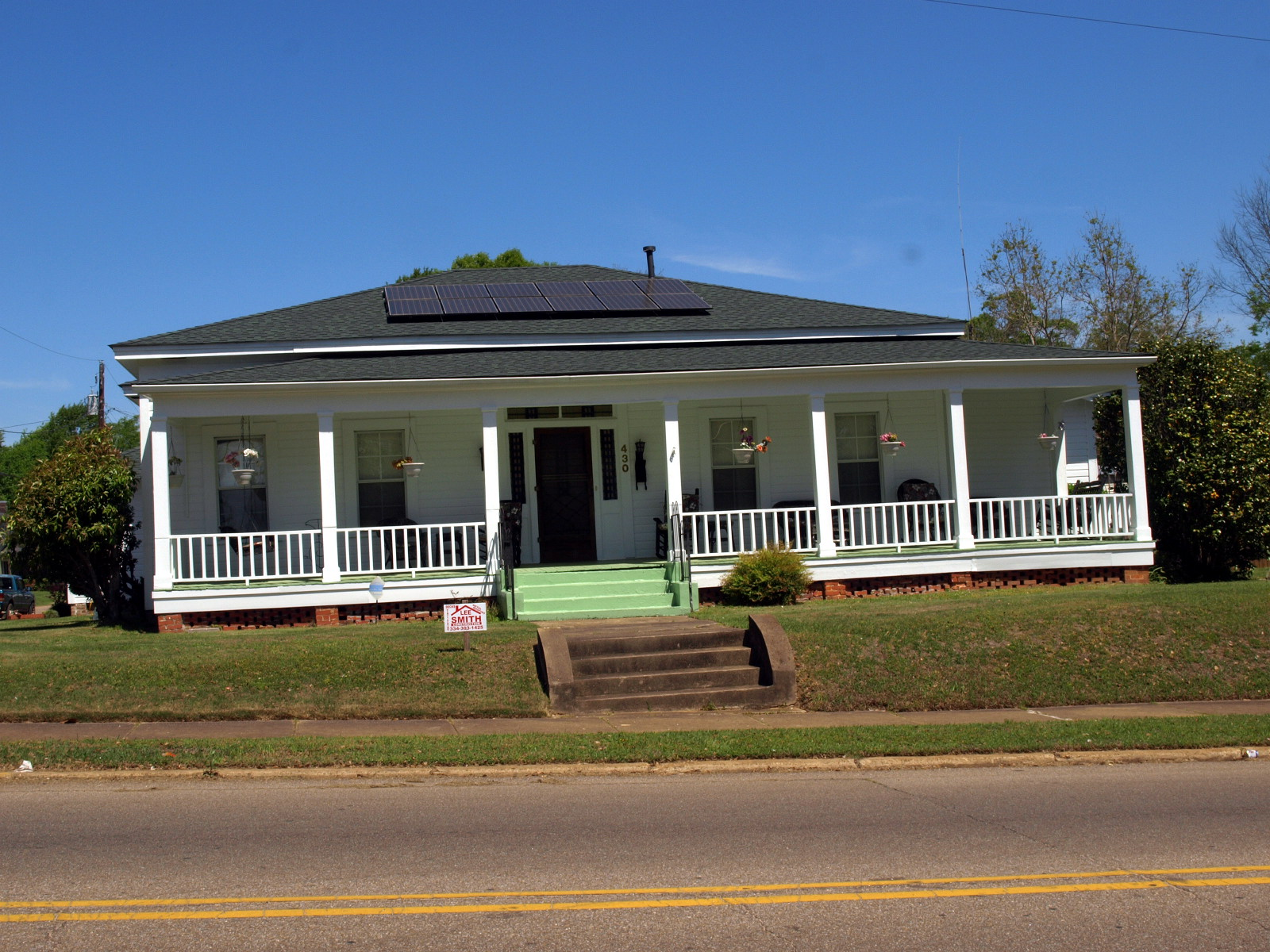
- 430 W. Commerce Street in April 2015
- Interactive map of King Street Historic District
- Location: Roughly bounded by W. Commerce, Oliver, Milner, and King Sts., Greenville, Alabama
- Built: 1845–1930
- Architectural style: Greek Revival
- NRHP reference No.: 86001971
- Added to NRHP: August 28, 1986

The King Street Historic District is a historic district in Greenville, Alabama, United States. The district is along King and West Commerce Streets, and consists of modest middle-class houses that historically have been rental properties. The earliest houses in the district are the Newman–Wright House (circa 1845) and 511 Milner Street (circa 1860). The remainder were built between 1890 and the 1920s, and are single-story frame houses with Queen Anne, Greek Revival, and bungalow influences.

The district was listed on the National Register of Historic Places in 1986.
