= Wright–Kilgore House =

- U.S. National Register of Historic Places
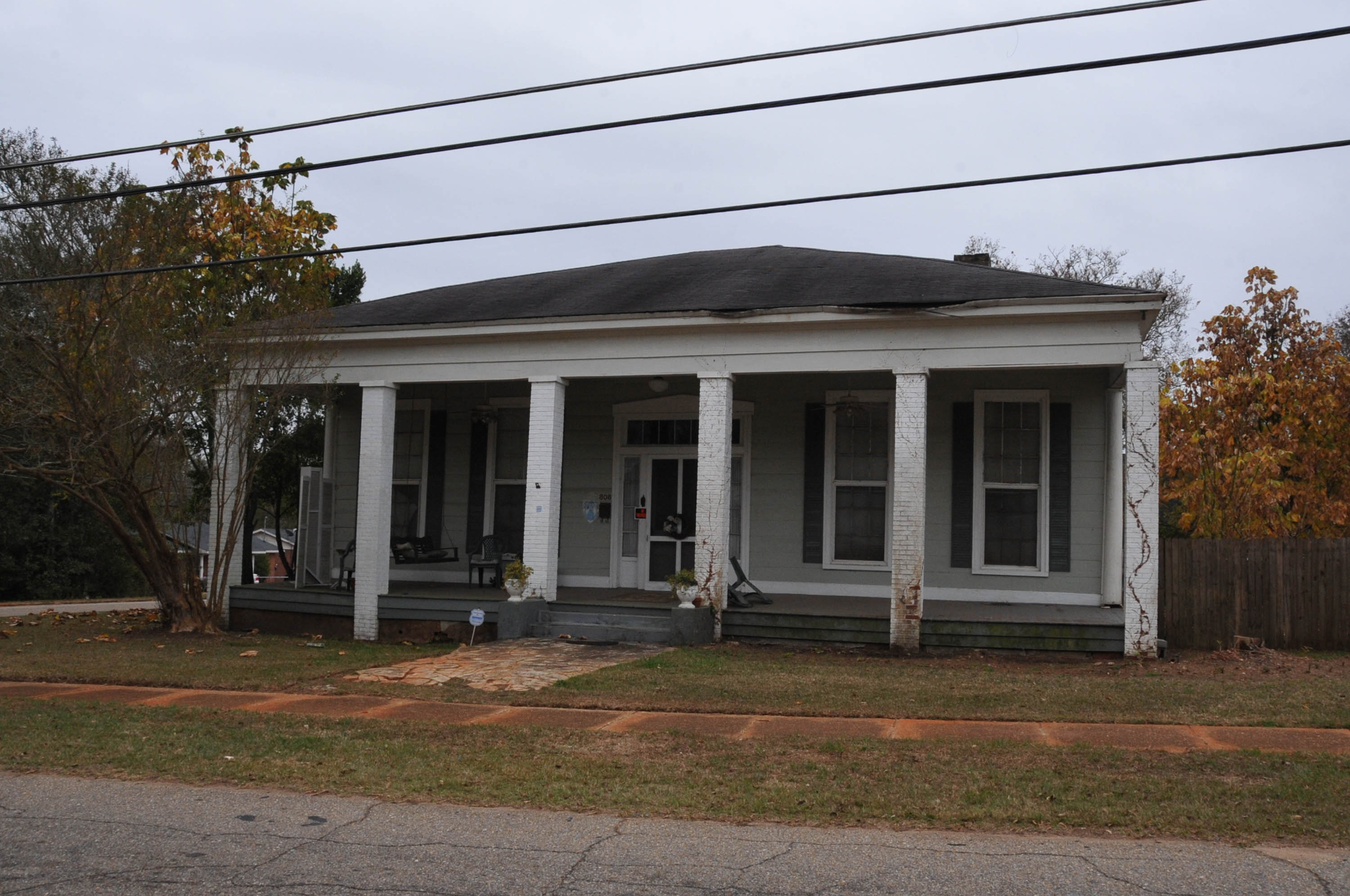
- The house in May 2008
- Interactive map of Wright–Kilgore House
- Location: 808 Walnut St., Greenville, Alabama
- Built: circa 1850
- Architectural style: Vernacular
- NRHP reference No.: 86001873
- Added to NRHP: September 4, 1986

The Wright–Kilgore House is a historic residence in Greenville, Alabama, United States. It was built around 1850 for planter and state legislator Robert Wright. The house is a one-story Vernacular building with Greek Revival details. The recessed front porch was originally supported by round wood columns, but have been replaced with square brick piers. The five-bay façade has a central entry surrounded by sidelights and a transom. On the rear, a small addition and shed roofed porch were added in the early 1900s.

The house was listed on the National Register of Historic Places in 1986.
