= Greenville Public School Complex =

Historic place in Alabama, United States

- U.S. National Register of Historic Places
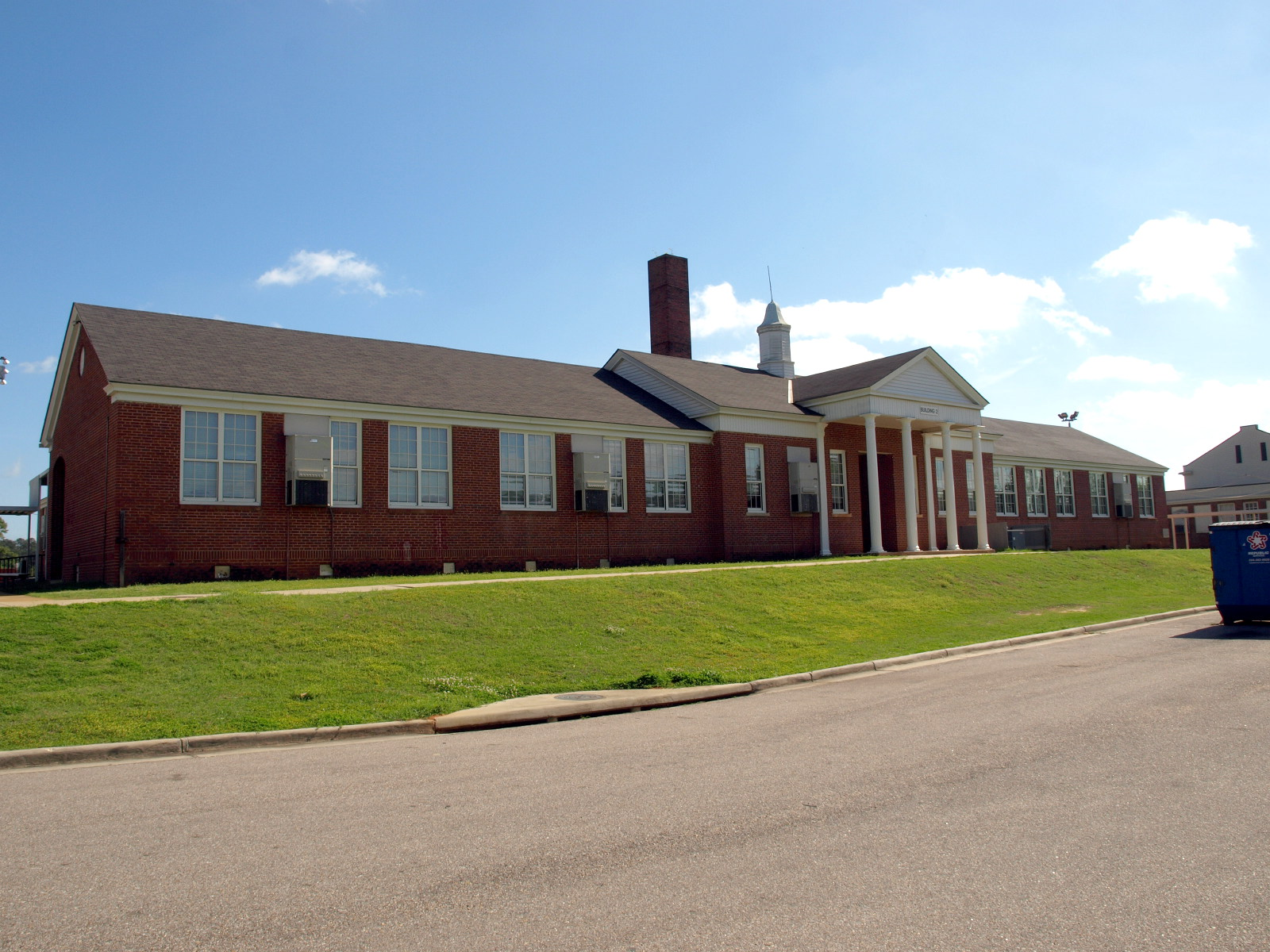
- The building in April 2015
- Interactive map of Greenville Public School Complex
- Location: 101 Butler Circle, Greenville, Alabama
- Coordinates: 31.83388°N 86.62531°W
- Built: 1925–1938
- Architect: J. W. Cooper
- Architectural style: Colonial Revival
- MPS: Greenville MRA
- NRHP reference No.: 86001811
- Added to NRHP: September 4, 1986

The Greenville Public School Complex is a historic school in Greenville, Alabama, United States. Butler County High School was built in 1925 as a consolidated school serving the entire county. A second building to house Walter O. Parmer Elementary School was completed on the same site in 1927. In 1937–38, the Public Works Administration constructed an auditorium, cafeteria, and manual arts training building. The high school was later renamed Greenville High School and has since relocated to a site along Interstate 65. A new building was constructed on site, and the campus is still used for Parmer Elementary.

The original building is a one-story, U-shaped Colonial Revival structure with a gable roof and projecting central bay with portico and a cupola. The 1927 structure is a two-story auditorium with one-story wings.

The complex was listed on the National Register of Historic Places in 1986.
