= Hinson House =

- U.S. National Register of Historic Places
- The house in November 1985
- Interactive map of Hinson House
- Location: 208 Oliver St., Greenville, Alabama
- Built: circa 1875
- Architectural style: Vernacular
- MPS: Greenville MRA
- NRHP reference No.: 86001854
- Added to NRHP: September 4, 1986

The Hinson House was a historic residence in Greenville, Alabama, United States. The house was built around 1875, and occupied in the 1870s by local cotton broker Alex T. Hinson. The house remained in the Hinson family until 1982. It was demolished sometime between its listing in 1986 and 2008. The house was a one-story frame structure with a gable roof flanked by chimneys. The façade was three bays wide, and the house had a rear ell and enclosed rear porch.

The house was listed on the National Register of Historic Places in 1986.
