= First Presbyterian Church (Greenville, Alabama) =

Historic church in Alabama, United States

- U.S. National Register of Historic Places
- Alabama Register of Landmarks and Heritage
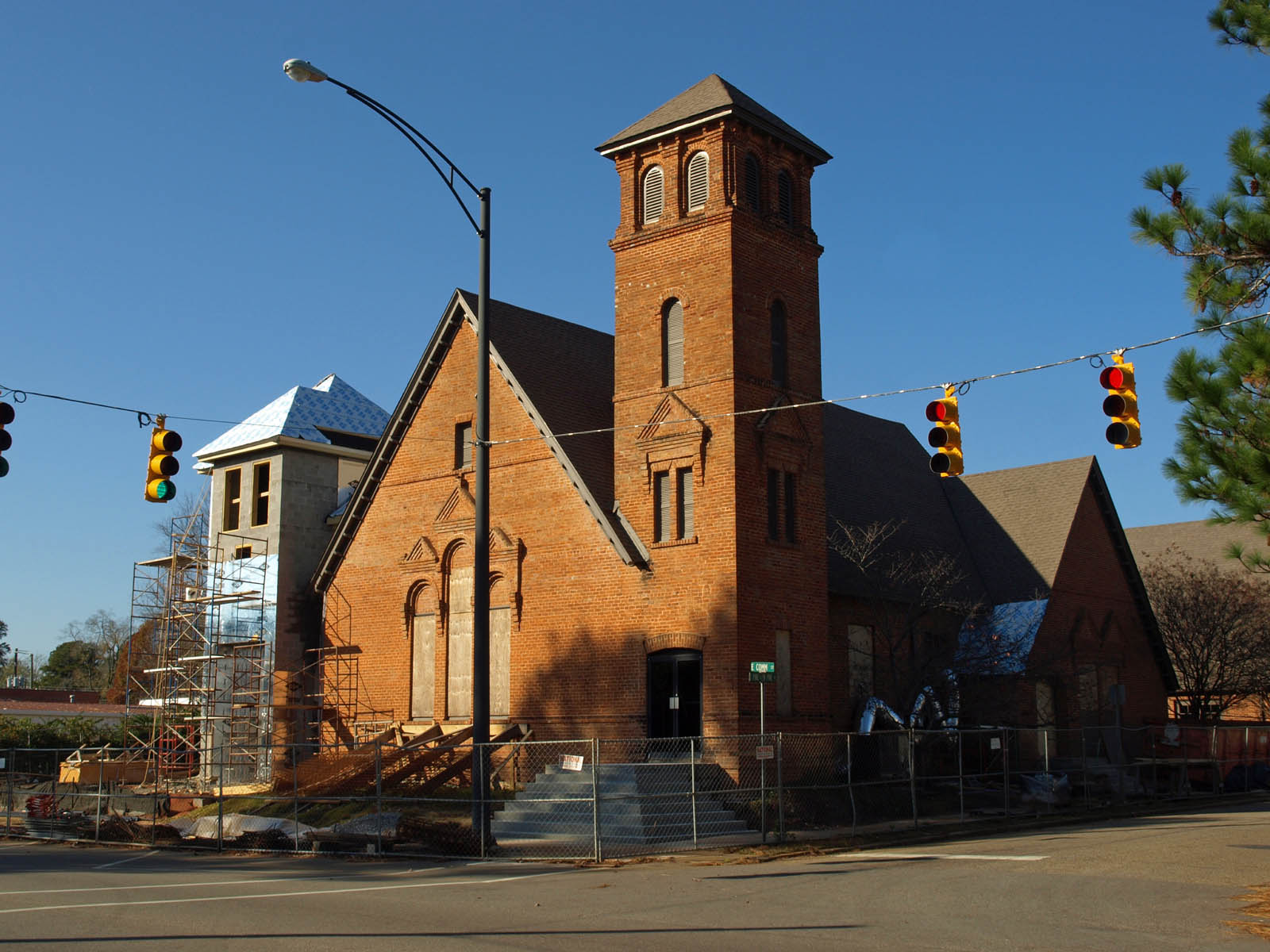
- First Presbyterian Church in November 2013

- Location within Alabama Location within the United States
- Location: 215 E. Commerce St., Greenville, Alabama
- Coordinates: 31°49′48″N 86°37′18″W
- Area: less than one acre
- Built: 1886
- Architectural style: Romanesque
- MPS: Greenville MRA
- NRHP reference No.: 86001801

Significant dates
- Added to NRHP: September 4, 1986
- Designated ARLH: March 29, 1977

First Presbyterian Church is a historic Presbyterian church at 215 East Commerce Street in Greenville, Alabama, United States. It was built in 1886 and added to the National Register of Historic Places in 1986. The church is a member of the Presbyterian Church in America.
