= Oakey Streak Methodist Episcopal Church =

Historic church in Alabama, United States

- U.S. National Register of Historic Places
- Alabama Register of Landmarks and Heritage
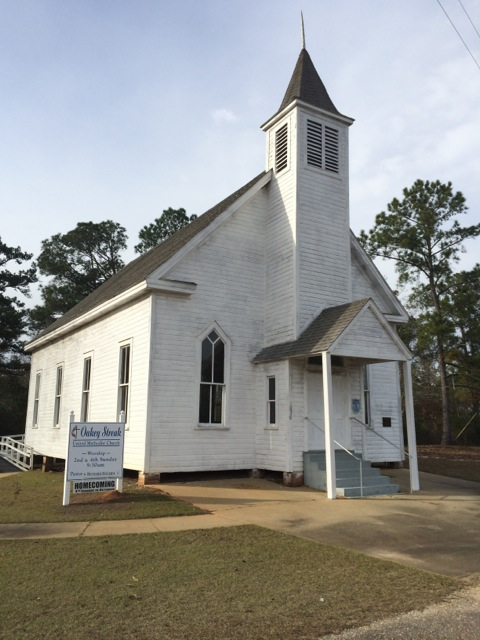
- The church in December 2013

- Location within Alabama Location within the United States
- Location: Alabama State Route 59, at intersection at State Route 23
- Nearest city: Greenville, Alabama
- Coordinates: 31°33′8″N 86°32′13″W
- Area: 10 acres (4.0 ha)
- Architectural style: Gothic Revival
- NRHP reference No.: 80000680

Significant dates
- Added to NRHP: January 4, 1980
- Designated ARLH: June 9, 1977

Oakey Streak Methodist Episcopal Church is a historic church in Butler County, Alabama, United States. The congregation was organized in 1831, and the land where the current church sits was given to the church in 1851. A log building was erected soon after, replaced by the current frame structure around the 1880s. The church was expanded and a bell tower was added in 1903. Along with the adjacent Masonic Lodge, which was demolished in the 1940s, the church was the social center of the area.

The church is built in Gothic Revival style, common among rural churches, and especially Methodist churches, in the South. The sanctuary is 32 feet wide by 48 feet long (9.8 by 14.6 m), with a front-facing gable roof and a box cornice with returns. The pyramidal roofed bell tower has a narrow one-over-one sash windows on each side, and a double entry door, covered by a simple pedimented overhang. An arched transom sits above the entryway. The tower is flanked by two Gothic lancet windows. Each side of the sanctuary has four equally-spaced two-over-two sashes.

The church was added to the National Register of Historic Places in 1980.
