= South Street Historic District (Greenville, Alabama) =

- U.S. National Register of Historic Places
- U.S. Historic district
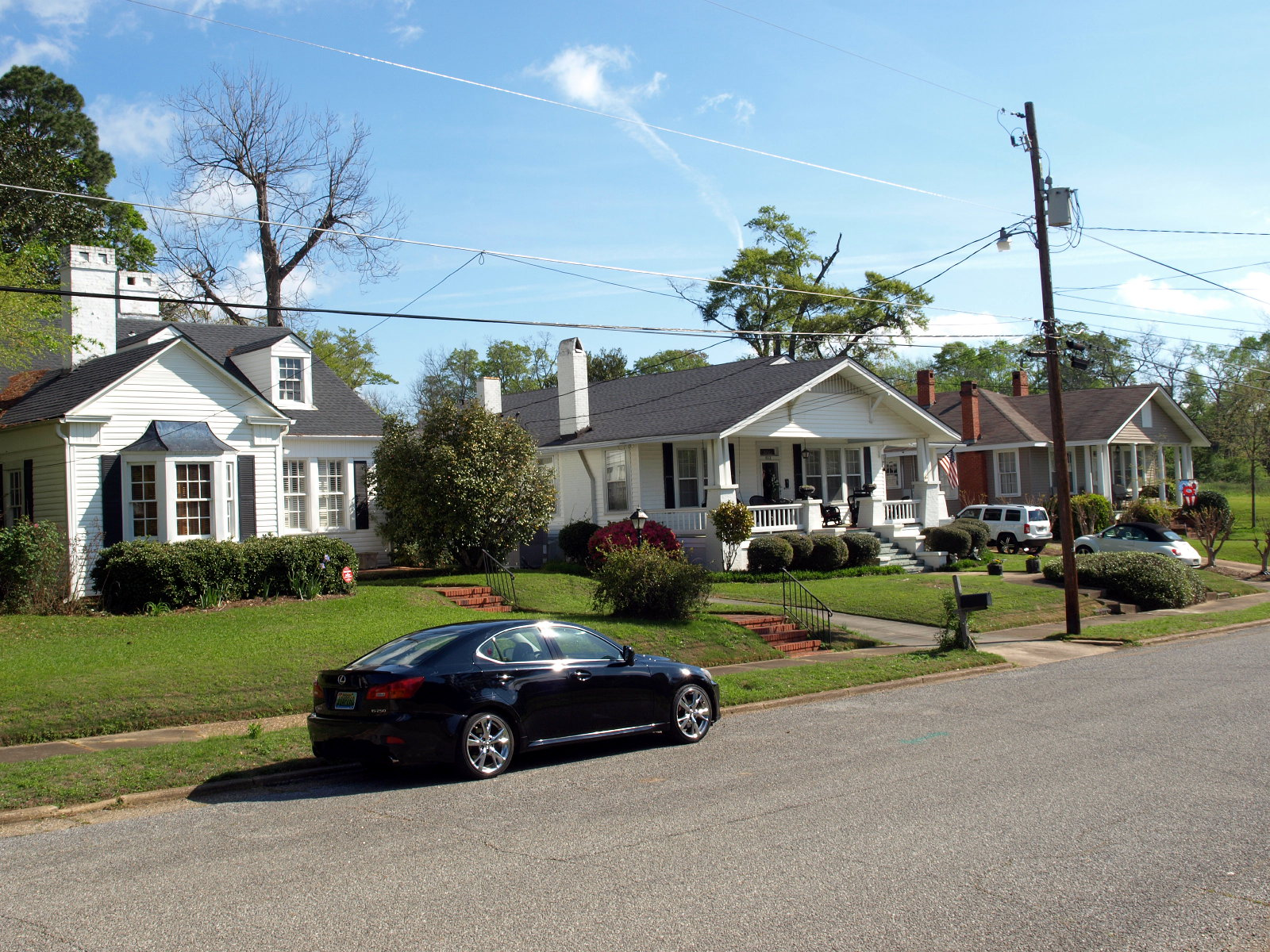
- Houses on South Street in April 2015
- Interactive map of South Street Historic District
- Location: Roughly bounded by South, Oliver, and McKenzie Sts., Greenville, Alabama
- Built: 1910–1936
- NRHP reference No.: 86001972
- Added to NRHP: August 28, 1986

The South Street Historic District is a historic district in Greenville, Alabama, United States. The area west of the railroad tracks and north of Commerce Street began to develop in the 1910s. Most of the houses are cottages and bungalows with Queen Anne, Colonial Revival, and Arts and Crafts details.

The district was listed on the National Register of Historic Places in 1986.
