= Confederate Park (Greenville, Alabama) =

- U.S. National Register of Historic Places
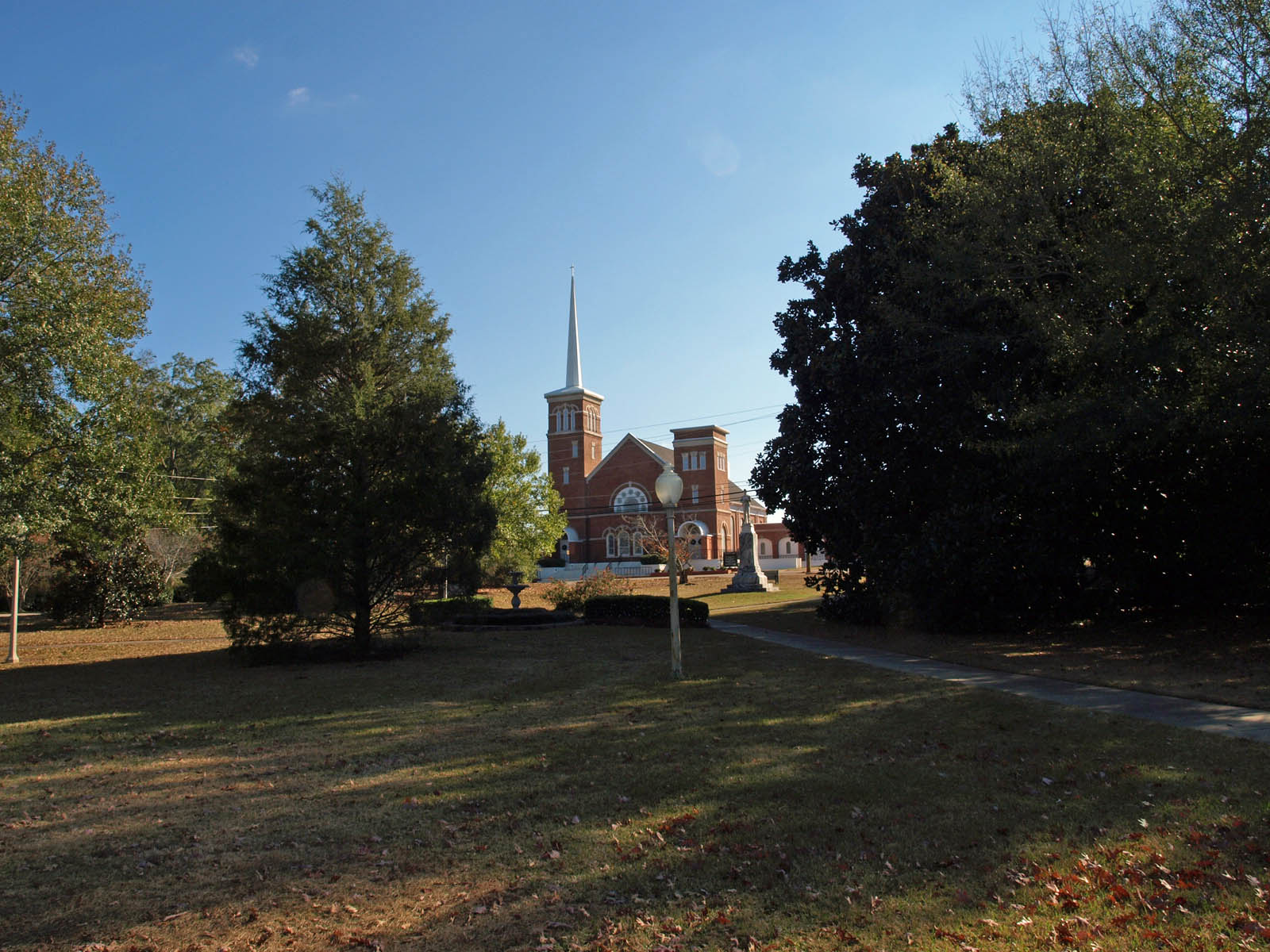
- Confederate Park and First Methodist Church in November 2013

- Location within Alabama Location within the United States
- Location: E. Commerce St., Greenville, Alabama
- Coordinates: 31°49′45″N 86°37′23″W
- Area: less than one acre
- Built: 1903
- Landscape architect: S. E. Washburn
- MPS: Greenville MRA
- NRHP reference No.: 86001791
- Added to NRHP: September 4, 1986

Confederate Park is a park in Greenville, Alabama, United States. The park was established in 1902 in front of the First Methodist Church on 1 acre (0.4 ha) of land donated by the church to the United Daughters of the Confederacy. The following year, the UDC commissioned a 16-foot (4.8-m) marble statue of a Confederate soldier on a pedestal. In the following years, many shrubs and shade trees were planted, and in 1909 a fountain was donated by Mayor Claude E. Hamilton, and was placed in the center of the park. Sidewalks along Commerce Street and diagonal walkways through the park, as well as several benches, were also placed. In the 1920s, a landscape architect was hired to place flowers and evergreens. In 1937, the city hall was built across Commerce Street from the park.

The park was listed on the National Register of Historic Places in 1986.
