= Greenville, Alabama =

City in Alabama, United States

Greenville
- City
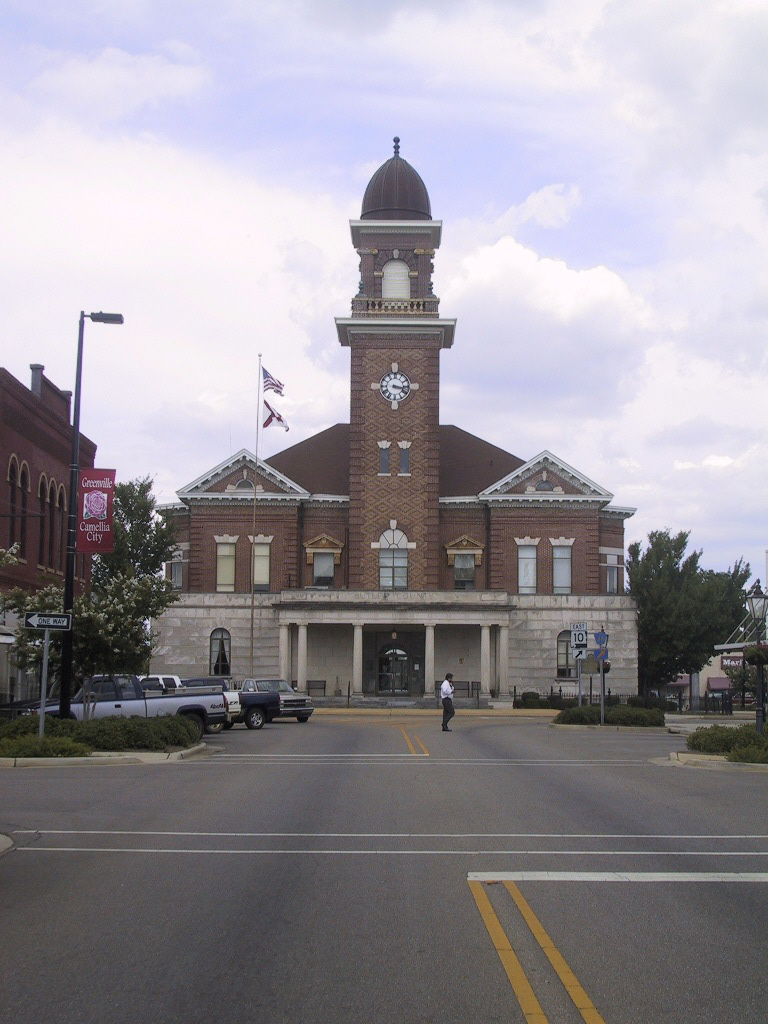
- Butler County Courthouse in Greenville

- Seal
- Nickname: Camellia City
- Location of Greenville in Butler County, Alabama.
- Coordinates: 31°51′32″N 86°38′19″W
- Country: United States
- State: Alabama
- County: Butler
- Founded: 1819
- Named for: Greenville, South Carolina

Government
  - Type: Mayor/Council

Area
  - Total: 21.53 sq mi (55.76 km^{2})
  - Land: 21.36 sq mi (55.31 km^{2})
  - Water: 0.18 sq mi (0.46 km^{2})
- Elevation: 463 ft (141 m)

Population (2020)
  - Total: 7,374
  - Density: 345.3/sq mi (133.33/km^{2})
- Time zone: UTC-6 (Central (CST))
  - Summer (DST): UTC-5 (CDT)
- ZIP code: 36037
- Area code: 334
- FIPS code: 01-31912
- GNIS feature ID: 2403748
- Website: greenvilleal.gov

Greenville is a city in and the county seat of Butler County, Alabama, United States. At the 2020 census, the population was 7,374. Greenville is known as the Camellia City, wherein originated the movement to change the official Alabama state flower from the goldenrod to the camellia with legislative sponsors LaMont Glass and H.B. Taylor.

== History ==
Greenville was first settled in 1819. Its original name was Buttsville, but after becoming the county seat in 1822, its name was changed to Greenville, in remembrance of the former locale in South Carolina of many of the original settlers. The first county seat was at Fort Dale, a fortification that was named for Sam Dale, who fought to defend the area during the Creek War. The site of Fort Dale lies on the north of the city near the Fort Dale Cemetery, along what is now Alabama Highway 185.

The namesake of the county, Captain William Butler, was killed during the Creek War. He is buried in the Pioneer Cemetery, which is across from the oldest church in Butler County, the First United Methodist Church of Greenville.

During World War II, a satellite camp for German prisoners was based in Greenville.

== Geography ==
Interstate 65 and U.S. Route 31 pass through the city. Montgomery, the state capital, is 44 miles (71 km) northeast, the closest city to Greenville with a population above 50,000.

According to the U.S. Census Bureau, Greenville has a total area of 21.5 square miles (55.8 km^{2}), of which 21.4 square miles (55.3 km^{2}) is land and 0.19 square miles (0.5 km^{2}), or 0.82%, is water.

=== Climate ===
The city of Greenville has a humid subtropical climate (Köppen: Cfa), with an average high temperature of 77.5 °F (25.3 °C) and an average low temperature of 51.5 °F (10.8 °C). The city averages 4.99 inches (127 mm) of precipitation per month.

Climate data for Greenville, Alabama (1991–2020 normals, extremes 1927–present)
Month	Jan	Feb	Mar	Apr	May	Jun	Jul	Aug	Sep	Oct	Nov	Dec	Year
Record high °F (°C)	87 (31)	86 (30)	89 (32)	96 (36)	100 (38)	108 (42)	106 (41)	105 (41)	103 (39)	100 (38)	91 (33)	86 (30)	108 (42)
Mean maximum °F (°C)	74.1 (23.4)	77.5 (25.3)	82.9 (28.3)	86.2 (30.1)	91.7 (33.2)	95.2 (35.1)	96.4 (35.8)	96.5 (35.8)	93.6 (34.2)	89.0 (31.7)	81.7 (27.6)	76.4 (24.7)	97.1 (36.2)
Mean daily maximum °F (°C)	59.9 (15.5)	64.3 (17.9)	71.4 (21.9)	77.9 (25.5)	84.8 (29.3)	89.8 (32.1)	91.7 (33.2)	91.5 (33.1)	87.6 (30.9)	79.3 (26.3)	69.3 (20.7)	62.2 (16.8)	77.5 (25.3)
Daily mean °F (°C)	46.9 (8.3)	50.8 (10.4)	57.1 (13.9)	63.6 (17.6)	71.4 (21.9)	77.7 (25.4)	80.2 (26.8)	79.9 (26.6)	75.7 (24.3)	65.7 (18.7)	55.2 (12.9)	49.2 (9.6)	64.5 (18.1)
Mean daily minimum °F (°C)	33.9 (1.1)	37.3 (2.9)	42.9 (6.1)	49.4 (9.7)	58.1 (14.5)	65.6 (18.7)	68.8 (20.4)	68.4 (20.2)	63.7 (17.6)	52.0 (11.1)	41.1 (5.1)	36.3 (2.4)	51.5 (10.8)
Mean minimum °F (°C)	18.7 (−7.4)	22.2 (−5.4)	26.7 (−2.9)	34.1 (1.2)	45.0 (7.2)	57.6 (14.2)	63.6 (17.6)	62.2 (16.8)	51.9 (11.1)	35.8 (2.1)	26.6 (−3.0)	23.1 (−4.9)	16.4 (−8.7)
Record low °F (°C)	−1 (−18)	9 (−13)	15 (−9)	28 (−2)	37 (3)	48 (9)	56 (13)	50 (10)	38 (3)	28 (−2)	11 (−12)	5 (−15)	−1 (−18)
Average precipitation inches (mm)	5.72 (145)	4.72 (120)	5.45 (138)	4.98 (126)	4.16 (106)	5.32 (135)	5.81 (148)	5.25 (133)	3.97 (101)	3.95 (100)	4.97 (126)	5.52 (140)	59.82 (1,519)
Average snowfall inches (cm)	0.1 (0.25)	0.0 (0.0)	0.2 (0.51)	0.0 (0.0)	0.0 (0.0)	0.0 (0.0)	0.0 (0.0)	0.0 (0.0)	0.0 (0.0)	0.0 (0.0)	0.0 (0.0)	0.2 (0.51)	0.5 (1.3)
Average precipitation days (≥ 0.01 in)	10.8	9.7	9.1	8.4	8.3	10.8	13.0	12.4	8.4	6.9	8.1	10.6	116.5
Average snowy days (≥ 0.1 in)	0.1	0.0	0.0	0.0	0.0	0.0	0.0	0.0	0.0	0.0	0.0	0.0	0.1
Source: NOAA

== Demographics ==
Historical population
Census	Pop.	Note	%±
1870	2,856		—
1880	2,471		−13.5%
1890	2,806		13.6%
1900	3,162		12.7%
1910	3,377		6.8%
1920	3,471		2.8%
1930	3,985		14.8%
1940	5,075		27.4%
1950	6,731		32.6%
1960	6,894		2.4%
1970	8,033		16.5%
1980	7,807		−2.8%
1990	7,492		−4.0%
2000	7,228		−3.5%
2010	8,135		12.5%
2020	7,374		−9.4%
U.S. Decennial Census

=== Racial and ethnic composition ===
Greenville city, Alabama – Racial and ethnic composition Note: the US Census treats Hispanic/Latino as an ethnic category. This table excludes Latinos from the racial categories and assigns them to a separate category. Hispanics/Latinos may be of any race. Race and ethnicity was not surveyed for populations under 2,500 in the 1980 census and under 1,000 in 1990 census.
Race / Ethnicity (NH = Non-Hispanic)	Pop 1980	Pop 1990	Pop 2000	Pop 2010	Pop 2020	% 1980	% 1990	% 2000	% 2010	% 2020
White alone (NH)	1,249	1,129	3,636	3,349	2,624	16.00%	15.07%	50.30%	41.17%	35.58%
Black or African American alone (NH)	1,914	1,896	3,464	4,493	4,292	24.52%	25.31%	47.92%	55.23%	58.20%
Native American or Alaska Native alone (NH)	0	4	20	4	8	0.00%	0.05%	0.28%	0.05%	0.11%
Asian alone (NH)	6	4	26	144	118	0.08%	0.05%	0.36%	1.77%	1.60%
Native Hawaiian or Pacific Islander alone (NH)	x	x	0	4	2	x	x	0.00%	0.05%	0.03%
Other race alone (NH)	0	0	1	2	10	0.00%	0.00%	0.01%	0.02%	0.14%
Mixed race or Multiracial (NH)	x	x	19	37	187	x	x	0.26%	0.45%	2.54%
Hispanic or Latino (any race)	79	14	62	102	133	1.01%	0.19%	0.86%	1.25%	1.80%
Total	3,248	3,047	7,228	8,135	7,374	100.00%	100.00%	100.00%	100.00%	100.00%

=== 2020 census ===
As of the 2020 census, Greenville had a population of 7,374. The median age was 40.1 years. 23.7% of residents were under the age of 18 and 19.5% of residents were 65 years of age or older. For every 100 females there were 81.4 males, and for every 100 females age 18 and over there were 73.6 males age 18 and over.

79.0% of residents lived in urban areas, while 21.0% lived in rural areas.

There were 3,184 households and 1,496 families in Greenville. Of all households, 30.3% had children under the age of 18 living in them; 28.9% were married-couple households, 17.8% were households with a male householder and no spouse or partner present, and 49.5% were households with a female householder and no spouse or partner present. About 37.2% of all households were made up of individuals and 16.0% had someone living alone who was 65 years of age or older.

There were 3,639 housing units, of which 12.5% were vacant. The homeowner vacancy rate was 3.6% and the rental vacancy rate was 10.8%.

=== 2010 census ===
As of the census of 2010, there were 8,135 people, 3,332 households, and 2,126 families residing in the city. The racial makeup of the city was 55.5% Black or African American, 41.7% White, 0.0% Native American, 1.8% Asian, 0.5% from other races, and 0.5% from two or more races. 1.3% of the population were Hispanic or Latino of any race.

In the city, 27.3% of the population was under the age of 18, 8.6% were 18 to 24, 25.0% were 25 to 44, 24.4% were 45 to 64, and 14.8% were 65 years of age or older. The median age was 35.3. For every 100 females, there were 82.2 males. For every 100 females age 18 and over, there were 78.7 males.

There were 3,332 households. Of those, 31.6% had children under the age of 18 living with them, 35.0% were married couples living together, 25.3% had a female householder with no husband present, and 36.2% were non-families. 33.3% of all households were made up of individuals, and 13.1% had someone living alone who was 65 years of age or older. The average household size was 2.40 and the average family size was 3.06.

The median income for a household in the city was $26,664, and the median income for a family was $31,107. Males had a median income of $33,716 versus $24,928 for females. The per capita income for the city was $15,649. About 20.3% of families and 24.9% of the population were below the poverty line, including 30.1% of those under age 18 and 20.9% of those age 65 or over.

== Economy ==
Prior to the Civil War, cotton farming was the main occupation in Butler County. Due to this, slave trade was very prominent in the surrounding areas such as the Alabama riverboat in Montgomery which paraded new slaves through the streets of downtown Montgomery. During the 1850s, the Mobile and Ohio Railroad constructed a line through Greenville, enabling it to became the center of commerce between Montgomery and south Alabama. During the late nineteenth century, the construction of the Louisville and Nashville Railroad through Greenville contributed further to Greenville's prosperity. In 1900, Gulf Red Cedar Company and Factory in Greenville was a bucket manufacturer in Greenville.

As of 2009, Greenville had a diverse industrial manufacturing base of companies in the textile, wood products, automobile, and other industries. Major employers included Hwashin American Corporation, Hysco America Corporation, CorStone Industry, and Connector Manufacturing.

== Arts and culture ==
The Ritz Theatre in Greenville hosts community events, plays, and an annual musical revue called "Puttin' on the Ritz".

Each September, the city hosts the Butler County Fair, which includes the "Old Time Farm Day" featuring tractor races, blacksmithing and quilting demonstrations.

== Parks and recreation ==
Cambrian Ridge is a golf course in Greenville. Sherling Lake Park and Campground has 41 campsites and surrounds two lakes east of the golf course.

== Government ==
The local government of Greenville is run by the Mayor and City Council. The city council consists of five members each elected from single member districts. The city is located in Alabama's 2nd Congressional District and is currently represented by U.S. Representative Shomari Figures.

== Education ==
=== Primary and secondary education ===
Public education is provided by the Butler County Schools.

- High School: Greenville High School
- Middle School: Greenville Middle School
- Elementary School: W.O. Parmer Elementary and Greenville Elementary School

Private schools in Greenville include Fort Dale Academy and Camellia City Christian School.

=== Post-secondary education ===
- Lurleen B. Wallace Community College, member of the Alabama Community College System awards two-year associate degrees and professional certificates.

== Media ==
=== Radio stations ===
- WGYV 1380 AM (Talk)
- WKXN 95.7 FM (Urban Contemporary)
- WQZX 94.3 FM

=== Newspaper ===
Weekly newspapers include The Greenville Standard, and Greenville Advocate.

=== Media filmed in Greenville ===
Residents were featured in the premiere episode of My Kind of Town (2005).

The movie Honeydripper (2007), was filmed in locations around Greenville in 2006.

== Notable people ==
- Ed Bell, country blues singer and guitarist
- Janice Rogers Brown, Judge of the United States Court of Appeals for the District of Columbia Circuit
- Beth Chapman, Secretary of State of Alabama from 2007 to 2013
- Leon Crenshaw, former defensive tackle for the Green Bay Packers
- Marlon Davidson, defensive tackle for the San Francisco 49ers
- Walter Flowers, member of the United States House of Representatives from 1969 to 1979
- Phil Hancock, professional golfer
- Lillian Hatcher, union organizer
- Hilary A. Herbert, former U.S. Congressman for the 2nd District of Alabama and Secretary of the Navy under Grover Cleveland
- Johnny Lewis, former outfielder for the St. Louis Cardinals and New York Mets
- Tommy Lewis, former American football fullback and coach
- George McMillan, 23rd Lieutenant Governor of Alabama
- Mark Matthews, World War II veteran and Buffalo Soldier
- Rufus Payne, blues musician
- Lewis B. Porterfield, Rear admiral in the United States Navy
- Bill Powell, first African American to design, construct and own a professional golf course in the United States
- Marty Raybon, country music singer of the group Shenandoah
- Za'Darius Smith, linebacker for the Cleveland Browns
- Jesse F. Stallings, former U.S. Congressman for the 2nd District of Alabama
- Thomas H. Watts, eighteenth governor of Alabama
- Hank Williams, country music singer; lived in Greenville briefly during childhood

== Gallery ==
Greenville, Alabama

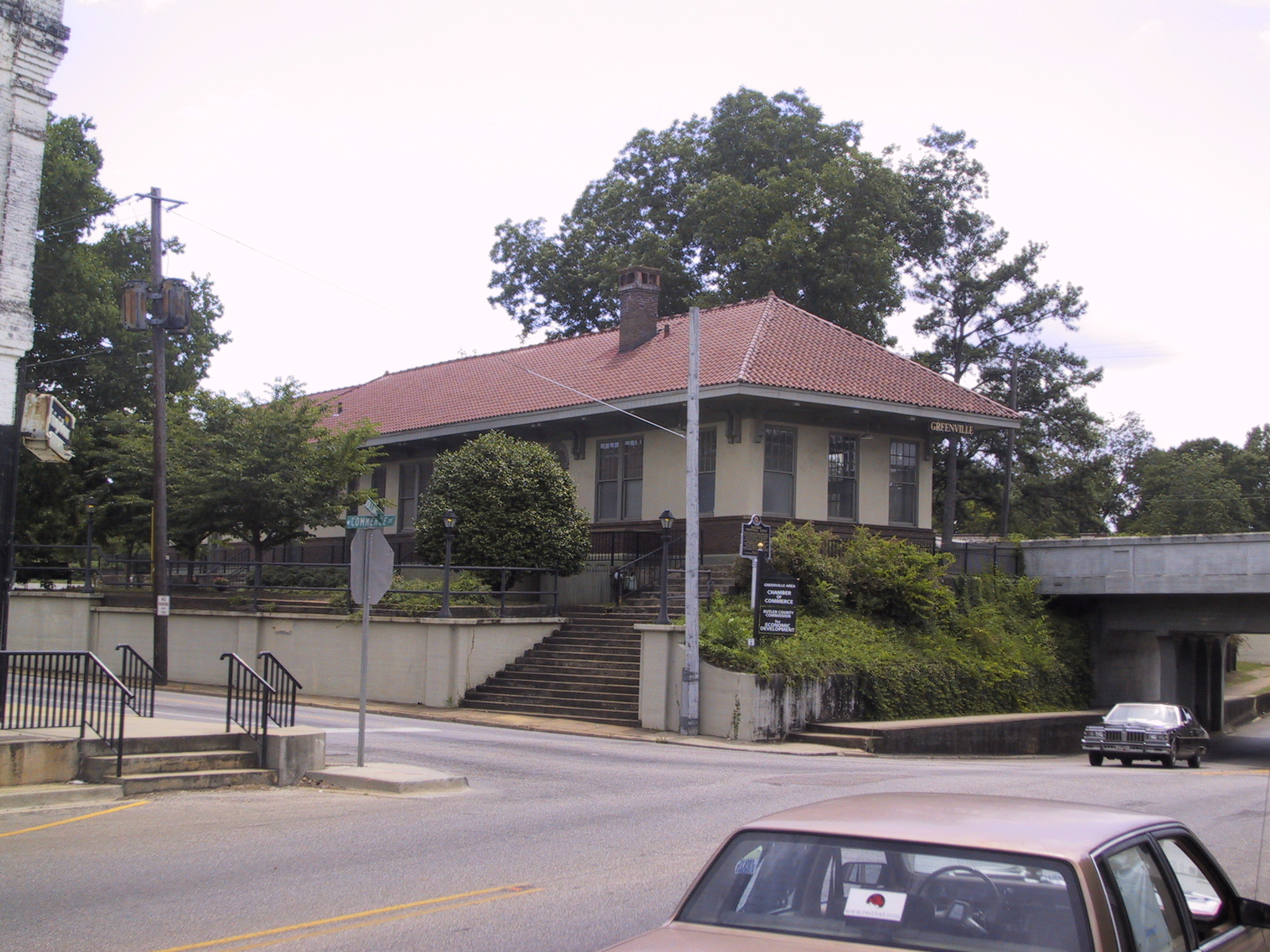
View of the old L&N train depot

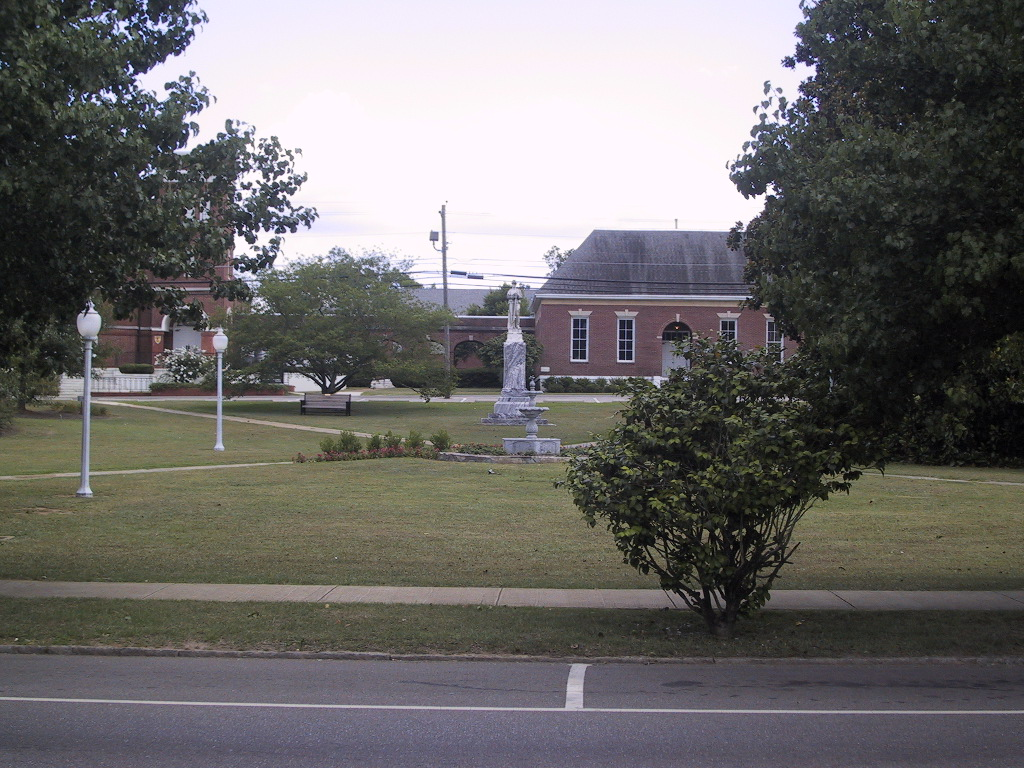
View of Confederate Park

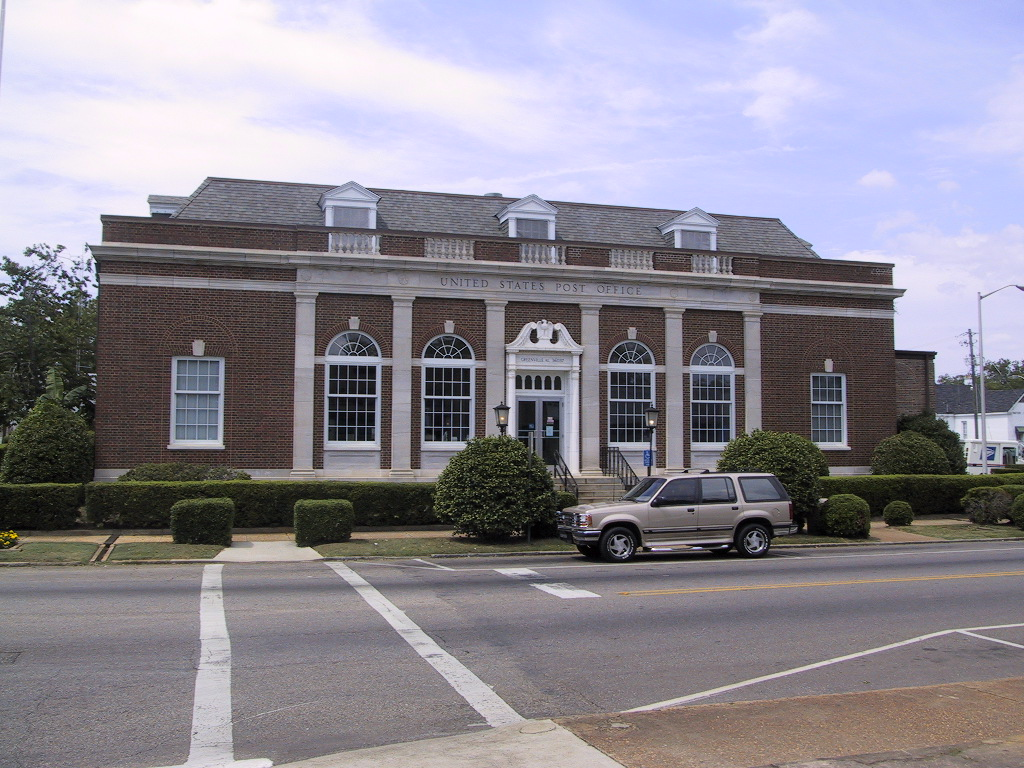
View of Greenville Post Office

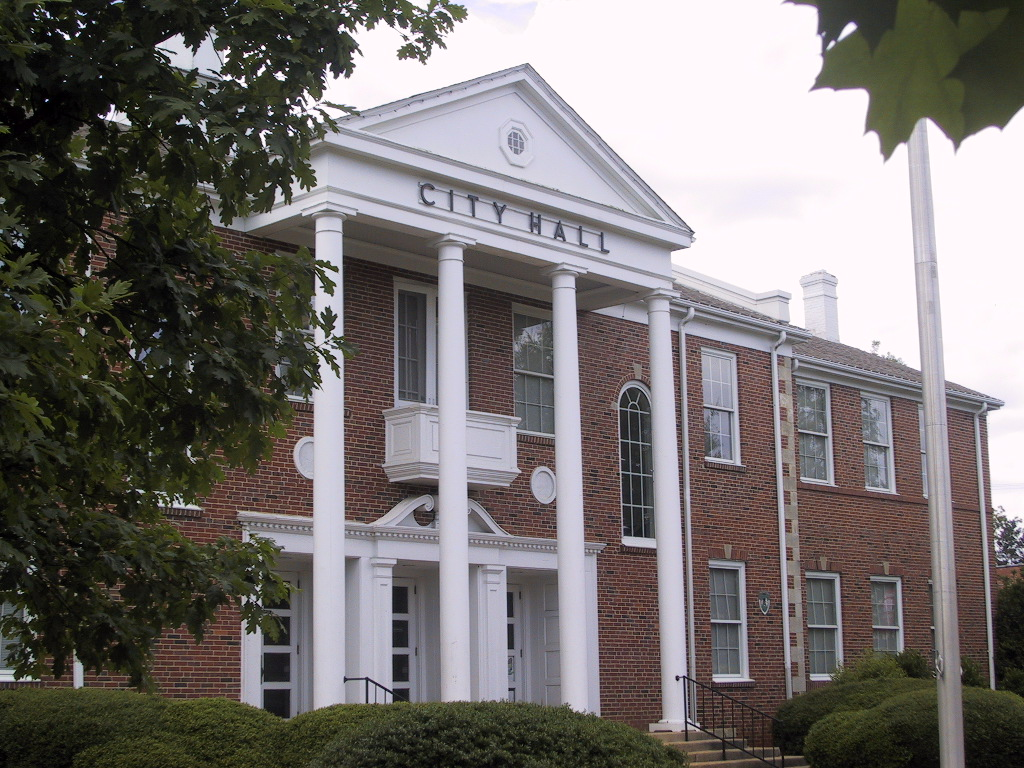
View of Greenville City Hall

== See also ==
- National Register of Historic Places listings in Butler County, Alabama
