= Worsley (surname) =

Worsley is a habitational surname with several points of origin, particularly Lancashire and Worcestershire. Notable people with the name include:

- A. A. Worsley (1869–1927), American politician from Arizona
- Arthington Worsley (1861–1944), English botanist
- Arthur Worsley (1920–2001), English ventriloquist
- Beatrice Worsley (1921–1972), Canadian computer scientist
- Benjamin Worsley (1618–1673), English physician and surveyor-general of Ireland
- Bob Worsley (born 1956), American politician from Arizona
- Bruce Digby-Worsley (1899–-1980), British flying ace
- Charles Worsley (cricketer) (1902–1990), English cricketer
- Frank Worsley (1872–1943), New Zealand explorer
- Giles Worsley (1961–2006), British architectural historian
- Gump Worsley (1929–2007), Canadian hockey player
- Henry Worsley (disambiguation) several people
- Israel Worsley (1768–1836), English Unitarian minister
- Joe Worsley (born 1977), English rugby player
- Lieutenant General John Worsley (British Army officer) (1912–1987)
- John Worsley (artist) (1919–2000), British naval artist and illustrator
- Les Vandyke (1931–2021), English singer and songwriter, also known as John Worsley
- Rev. John Worsley (scholar) (1696–1767), English scholar and schoolmaster
- J. R. Worsley (1923–2003), English acupuncturist associated with 5 Element Style
- Katharine Worsley (1933–2025), maiden name of the Duchess of Kent
- Lucy Worsley (born 1973), British historian and curator
- Sir Marcus Worsley, 5th Baronet (1925–2012), British politician, brother of the Duchess of Kent
- Maureen Worsley (1937–2001), Australian politician
- Mike Worsley (born 1976), English rugby player
- Miller Worsley (1791–1835), English naval officer
- Philip Stanhope Worsley (1835–1866), English poet
- Richard Worsley (1923–2013), English general
- Roger L. Worsley (born 1937), American academic
- T. C. Worsley (1907–1977), British critic
- William Worsley (priest) (c. 1435 – 1499), dean of St. Paul's Cathedral, London
- Sir William Worsley, 4th Baronet (1890–1973), baronet and cricketer, father of the Duchess of Kent
- Sir William Worsley, 6th Baronet (born 1956), baronet and forester, nephew of the Duchess of Kent
- Willie Worsley (born 1945), American professional basketball player

== See also ==
- Lady Worsley (disambiguation)
- Worsley baronets
- Worsley (disambiguation)
- Worsley-Taylor baronets
