= Worsley (disambiguation) =

Worsley is a suburban area in Greater Manchester, England.

== Places ==
=== Antarctica ===
- Cape Worsley, Graham Land
- Mount Worsley, South Georgia Island
- Worsley Icefalls, Nimrod Glacier, Antarctica

=== Australia ===
- Worsley, Western Australia
- Worsley River (Western Australia)

=== Canada ===
- Worsley, Alberta

=== United Kingdom ===
- Worsley (UK Parliament constituency)
- Worsley (ward)
- Worsley and Eccles South (UK Parliament constituency)
- Worsley Building, Leeds School of Medicine

== Other uses ==
- Lady Worsley (disambiguation)
- Worsley (surname)
- Worsley baronets, a title in the Baronetage of England
- Worsley Works, a British manufacturer of kits for model trains

== See also ==
- Worsleya, a genus of plants in the Amaryllis family
