= Smooth Ashlar Grand Lodge =

The Most Worshipful Smooth Ashlar Grand Lodge F&AAYM is a subordinate Masonic Grand Lodge of the Most Worshipful National Grand Lodge of Free and Accepted Ancient York Masons Prince Hall Origin - National Compact in and for the State of Georgia. Through it subordination to the National Grand Lodge, Smooth Ashlar Grand Lodge has lineage to African Lodge No. 459.

== History ==
=== Background: Formation of the Most Worshipful Prince Hall Grand Lodge of Georgia ===
On August 22, 1870, representatives of National Grand Lodge subordinate Lodges met and organized and established the Most Worshipful Grand Lodge of Georgia (Colored) under the jurisdiction of the Most Worshipful National Grand Lodge. On this date and at this meeting, Bro. James Merilus Simms was installed as the first Grand Master for the state of Georgia. National Grand Master Richard Howell Gleaves presented the Grand Lodge its National Grand Lodge Warrant. The minutes from the establishment stated the following: "Bro. R. H. Gleaves M. W. National Grand Master took the chair and delivered an elegant and instructive address on the Cardinal Virtues after which at 2 ½ o’clock P. M. The convention was called off. At 4 ½ o’clock the convention was called on. At the request of the N. G. M. the minutes of the convention held June 4th and 29th were read. The Grand Secretary elect read the Warrant of Constitution granted the Grand Lodge for the state of Georgia by the M. W. National Grand Lodge."

Four years following the establishment of the Grand Lodge of Georgia (colored) by the National Grand Lodge, a rival independent Grand Lodge of African-American Masons was established on June 23–27, 1874.

On June 26–27, 1888, the Original National Grand Lodge subordinate Grand Lodge and the Independent Grand Lodge merged to form a new independent Grand Lodge styled the Most Worshipful Union Grand Lodge of Georgia AF&AM. This Grand Lodge has existed to the present and is now styled the Most Worshipful Prince Hall Grand Lodge of Georgia F&AM.

=== Smooth Ashlar Grand Lodge ===
In light of various Grand Lodges which declared independence from the National Grand Lodge and the National Grand Lodge's view of the actions being "rebellious", Captain William D. Matthews issued his Manifesto. In it he notes: "I, therefore give each state, Grand Lodge, subordinate lodge or lodges in such open rebellion until the 8th day of March 1888, to return to their allegiance, and to report to the National Grand Secretary, John A. Mulligan, 117 James Street, Allegheny City, Pennsylvania. Failing to comply with this order, I shall commission Grand Masters with full power and authority in those rebellious states, and organize Grand Lodges according to the precedent which was laid down in 1733."

On December 27, 1892, by the mandate of the Matthews Manifesto, Smooth Ashlar Grand Lodge was established.
