= George W. LeVere =

African American pastor (1820–1886)

George Washington LeVere (October 9, 1820 – October 10, 1886) was an African American pastor, educator, abolitionist, and civil rights activist. As president of the African Civilization Society, LeVere met with President Abraham Lincoln and discussed the educational needs of freedmen. LeVere was a chaplain with the United States Colored Troops and served as a delegate to two Colored National Conventions and numerous Tennessee Republican Conventions. He was also the National Grand Master of the National Grand Lodge, Free and Accepted Ancient York Rite Masons, Prince Hall Origin, National Compact, from 1877 to 1886.

== Early life ==
LeVere was born in Brooklyn, New York on October 9, 1820. He attended school in Brooklyn. He joined the Second Street Bethel Church, having been converted by Rev. Richard Robinson. He studied theology under Dr. Starrs.

== Career ==
=== Education ===
While studying to be a pastor, LeVere taught school for the General Assembly of Freedman in Brooklyn. After the Civil War, he was the president of the African Civilization Society which operated a school, recruited black teachers for the South, and collected books and clothing for the freedmen in Washington, D.C. In this capacity, he met with and made a presentation to President Abraham Lincoln on November 5, 1863. LeVere described the meeting as "highly satisfactory". LeVere was also involved with the Freedman's Aid Society, which sent teachers from the North to the South.

By 1867, LaVere established and was superintendent of a sabbath school and a day school in basement of Shiloh Presbyterian Church. He was hired to be a teacher with the Freedman's Bureau in Knoxville, Tennessee in 1867,1868, and 1869. He was the supervisor of the Shieldstown School in Knoxville. He was elected to Knoxville's school board for colored children on September 13, 1875. In October 1881, LeVere was elected a trustee of Maryville College.

LeVere also helped organize and was an officer of the Colored Mechanics of Knoxville, a trade association.

=== Clergy ===
Around 1853, LeVere became the pastor of St. Paul's Congregational Church in the Flatbush neighborhood of Brooklyn. In 1864, he resigned from the church to become the regimental chaplain of the 20th Regiment of the United States Colored Troops (USCT) during the American Civil War. This was an unusual position with the USCT, making him an officer, a rank then limited for Blacks to only surgeons and chaplains, but he was appointed by President Lincoln to serve in this capacity. When he protested his exclusion from the general officers mess at the Rikers Island training camp, the commanding officer, Colonel Nelson Bartram, invited LeVene to dine with him. As the regimental chaplain, LeVere served in Louisiana and Texas.

After the war, LeVene was recruited to be a missionary in Knoxville, Tennessee. He arrived on February 9, 1866, and joined the twelve founders of the Shiloh Presbyterian Church, which lacked a physical building for worship. Initially, he secured the use of the former First Presbyterian Church which was vacant. Later, the church met in the backyard of Perez Dickinson, with LeVere preaching from the mansion's back porch. After several moves, funds were raised, and a church was built on the corner of Church and Clinch Streets.

In February 1873, the Knoxville Weekly Chronicle noted, "Their pastor, Rev. G. W. LeVere, is a zealous and ardent worker in the cause and is highly respected and beloved by his people." He also helped establish churches in Maryville, Tennessee and New Market, Tennessee. He was officially installed as pastor of the Shiloh Presbyterian Church on May 13, 1881, after sixteen years of serving in that capacity. He stayed with the Shiloh Church for a total of seventeen years.

In May 1884, LeVere accepted a position with the Zion Presbyterian Church in Charleston, South Carolina, where he was working when he died.

=== Politics and activism ===
On August 27, 1856, LeVere served on a committee with two others who drafted resolutions for 6,000 Blacks in New York, urging others to support the Republicans and to volunteer for military service against the South. He campaigned won behalf of Republican John C. Frémont in 1856. He was an officer of the New York Suffrage Association and allowed his church in Brooklyn to host meetings to discuss the Black Suffrage Plan of 1858.

Throughout the Civil War, LeVere was a correspondent for the Weekly Anglo-African and wrote letters to The Christian Recorder and the National Anti-Slavery Standard, detailing the racism the 20th received when serving in New Orleans from both White locals and Union soldiers. LeVere also wrote about Abraham Lincoln's death and advocated for freedom and equality for Black soldiers and freedmen.

In 1874, LeVere was an organizer, delegate, and vice chairman of the Tennessee State Convention for Colored Citizens which was convened to express the need for a Supplemental Civil Rights Bill. In October 1874, 116 black citizens of Knoxville signed a petition for LeVere to run for the United States Congress against a White candidate, primarily to support the Civil Rights Bill. LeVere candicacy for Republican candidacy quickly failed as two of the three White candidates withdrew to strengthen the fight against Black rights.

In 1876, LeVene served on a grand jury for the United States Circuit Court. He was one of Tennessee's delegates to the Colored National Convention in April 1876 and again in May 1879. At the latter, he was appointed to the convention's Committee for Permanent Organization.

In May 1876, LeVene was a delegate to the Tennessee Republican Convention, representing the second district, and was also appointed to a permanent committee to organize the annual convention. He was selected to serve as the alternate for the 1876 Republican National Convention representing the state of Tennessee at Large. He was again a delegate to the Tennessee Republican Convention in 1877 and 1878, this time presenting the twelfth district. He served as the secretary of the Knox County Republican Party in 1878.

In July 1880, Levere was a vice president of a temperance association formed by a consortium of religious organizations in the Knoxville area. Later that year, he was a public speaker on behalf of Republicans for the county canvass. He was an election enumerator for Knox County in 1881.

== Personal life ==
Levere's first wife was Loretta, a trained nurse who volunteered with the Howard Association. They had three children, William, Ambella and George Jr. before her death sometime prior to 1880. When the family moved to Knoxville, Tennessee after the Civil War, they were the only Blacks in a White working-class neighborhood. On January 19, 1882, he married Philena L. Sterrett of Jersey City, New Jersey.

LeVere was a member of Prince Hall Freemasonry and was a charter member of the Meridian Lodge No. 42 of Knoxville in 1870. He served as the Grand Master the Grand Lodge of Colored Masons of Tennessee from around 1872. In July 1876, he co-founded a masonic lodge Greenville, Tennessee. On August 31, 1876, he was elected the National Grand Secretary at the national convention in Leavenworth, Kansas. He was the Grand Master of the National Grand Lodge, Free & Accepted Ancient York Rite Masons, Prince Hall Origin, National Compact from 1877 until his death. In July 1884, he fell into dispute with a faction of the Grand Lodge of Tennessee led by P. F. Hill. However, Levere maintained that the challenge was from a disassociated group that did not represent the national fraternal order.

In early August 1881, LeVere became ill with bilious fever and was confined for several weeks. LeVere died on October 10, 1886, in Summerville, South Carolina after being ill will bilious fever for several days. His wife died six days later. His funeral was conducted by Bishop Turner of Atlanta, Georgia at Shiloh Presbyterian Church in Knoxville and was attended by both Blacks and Whites. LeVene was buried in the Daughters of Zion Cemetery.
