= John Howard (prison reformer) =

English prison reformer and philanthropist (1726–1790)

John Howard FRS
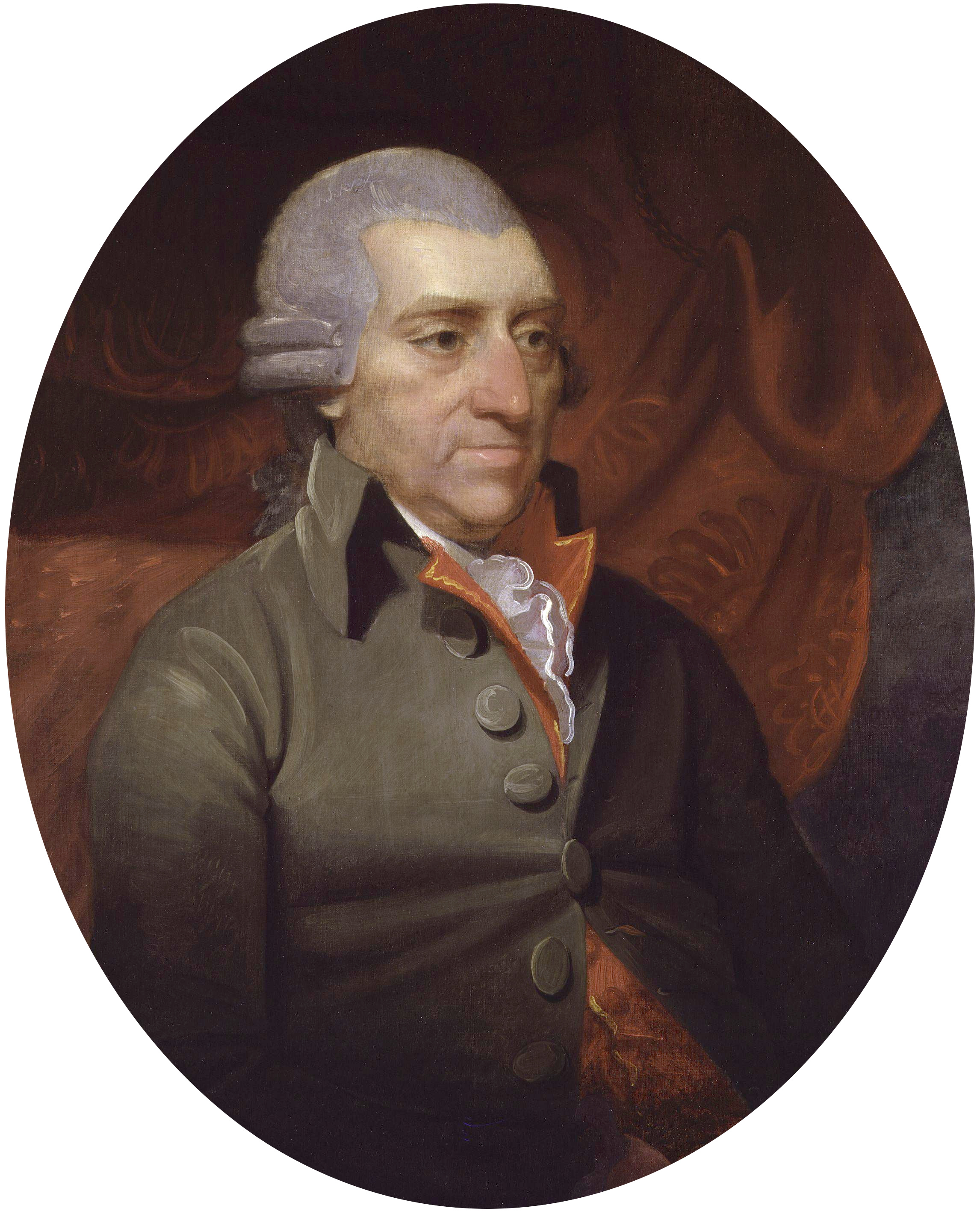
- John Howard (1789) by Mather Brown

High Sheriff of Bedfordshire
- In office 1773–1774

Personal details
- Born: 2 September 1726 London, England
- Died: 20 January 1790 (aged 63) Kherson, Russian Empire
- Spouse(s): Sarah Loidore (d. 1750s) Henrietta Leeds (m. 1758; died 1765)
- Children: 1

John Howard (2 September 1726 – 20 January 1790) was an English philanthropist known for his work as an early prison reformer.

Howard began inspecting prisons while serving as High Sheriff of Bedfordshire and toured prisons across the United Kingdom and Europe using his personal fortune. Howard documented his experiences in the 1777 exposé The State of the Prisons which described the terrible conditions of these prisons in great detail. Howard became a leading authority on prison reform to Parliament and co-drafted the Penitentiary Act 1779 which introduced the first policy for state-run prisons in the United Kingdom. Howard pioneered the concept of single-celling and advocated for better cleanliness in prisons, solitary confinement, hard labour, access to religious instruction, salaried prison staff, and a greater role of rehabilitation.

Howard's advocacy and writings were highly influential in prison reform in the United Kingdom, Europe, and the United States, and his work continued to influence prison reform into the Victorian era. A number of prison reform and humanitarian organisations are named in his honour.

== Early life ==
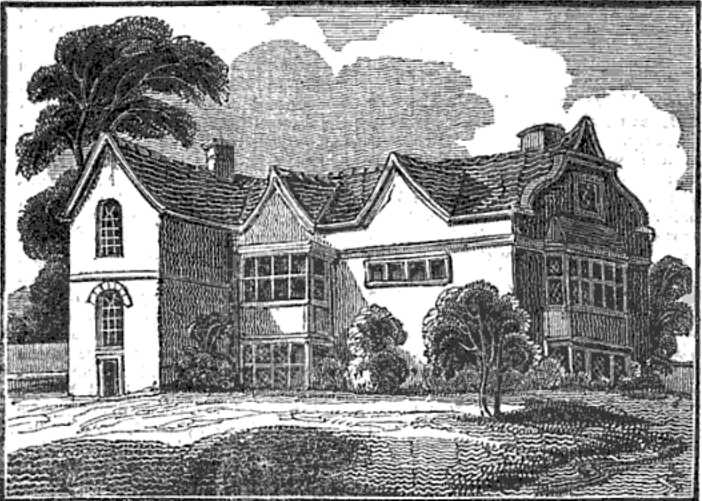
A picture published in 1826, supposedly of the house where Howard was born.

John Howard was born on 2 September 1726 in London, either in Hackney or Enfield in North London. His father, also John, was a wealthy upholsterer at Smithfield Market in the City of London. His mother Ann (née Pettitt or Cholmley) died when he was five years-old.. Howard was described as a "sickly child" and was sent to live at Cardington, Bedfordshire, some 50 miles north of London, where his father owned property. John Sr., a strict disciplinarian with strong religious Protestant beliefs, sent the young John to a school in Hertford run by John Worsley before being sent to a dissenting academy in London run by John Eames. After his school, he was apprenticed to a wholesale grocer to learn business methods, but was unhappy with this.

Howard's father died in 1742, leaving him with a sizeable inheritance but no true vocation, a Calvinist faith and a quiet, serious disposition.

== Early travels and Cardington ==
In 1748, Howard left England for a grand tour of Europe. On his return, he lived in lodgings in Stoke Newington, where he again became seriously ill. He was nursed back to health by his landlady, Sarah Loidore, whom he then married despite her being 30 years his senior. Loidore died within three years of their marriage, leaving him a widower only in his twenties.

Howard then set out for Portugal following the 1755 Lisbon earthquake, travelling on the Hanover, which was captured by French privateers. He was imprisoned in Brest for six days before being transferred to another prison on the coast of France. He was later exchanged for a French officer held by the British, and went to the Commissioners of Sick and Wounded Seamen in London to seek help on behalf of his fellow captives. It is widely believed that this personal experience generated Howard's interest in prisons.

Howard settled again at Cardington after having returned from France, living on a 200-acre (0.81 km^{2}) estate which was formerly two farms, the larger of which he had inherited from his grandparents. Howard was a cousin and close friend of his neighbour, Samuel Whitbread, to whom he was related through his paternal grandmother Martha Howard. He spent the next two years building properties and trying to improve the lives of the tenants living on his land. Later, a survey of Cardington in 1782 found that he was paying for the schooling of 23 children.

Howard was elected a Fellow of the Royal Society in May 1756.

In 1758, Howard married as his second wife Henrietta Leeds, daughter of Edward Leeds (died 1758), a barrister. Henrietta died in 1765, a week after giving birth to a son, also named John, who was sent to boarding school at a very young age. The younger John would attend Cambridge, but would later be expelled for homosexual offences, judged insane at the age of 21, and died in 1799 having spent thirteen years in a lunatic asylum.

== Prison visitor ==
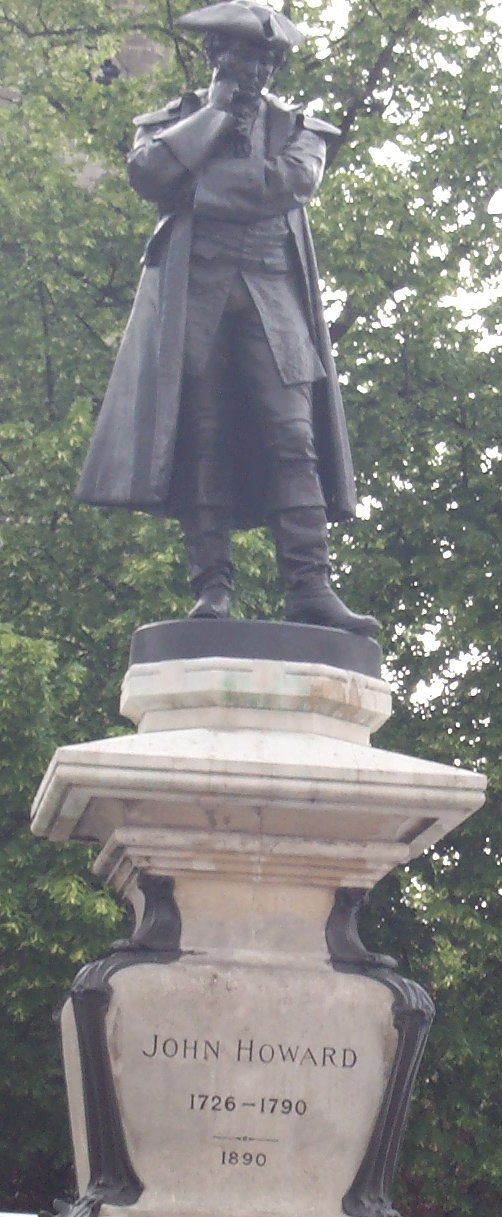
Statue of John Howard, Bedford

Howard was appointed High Sheriff of Bedfordshire in 1774, initially for a one-year period. Rather than delegating his duties to the under-sheriff, Howard inspected the county prison himself and was shocked by what he found, spurring into action to inspect prisons throughout England. Of particular concern to Howard were those prisoners who were held because they could not pay the jailer's fee – an amount paid to the owner or keeper of the prison for upkeep. He took this issue to Parliament, and in 1774 was called to give evidence on prison conditions to a House of Commons' select committee. Unusually, Howard was called to the bar of the House of Commons and publicly thanked for his "humanity and zeal".

Howard visited several hundred prisons across England, Scotland, Wales and wider Europe, publishing the first edition of The State of the Prisons in 1777. It included very detailed accounts of the prisons he had visited, including plans and maps, together with detailed instructions on the necessary improvements, especially regarding hygiene and cleanliness, the lack of which was causing many deaths. It is this work that has been credited as establishing the practice of single-celling in the United Kingdom and, by extension, in the United States. Howard's views on keeping prisoners in isolation were later unavailingly opposed by Elizabeth Fry, who believed in the value of association. The following account, of the Bridewell at Abingdon, Oxfordshire, is typical:

Two dirty day-rooms; and three offensive night-rooms: That for men eight feet square: one of the women's, nine by eight; the other four and a half feet square: the straw, worn to dust, swarmed with vermin: no court: no water accessible to prisoners. The petty offenders were in irons: at my last visit, eight were women.

Howard viewed his work as humanitarian. Terry Carlson, in his 1990 biographical tract on Howard, remarks:

Howard's detailed proposals for improvements were designed to enhance the physical and mental health of the prisoners and the security and order of the prison. His recommendations pertaining to such matters as the prison location, plan and furnishings, the provision of adequate water supply, and prisoner's diet promoted hygiene and physical health. Recommendations concerning the quality of prison personnel, rules related to the maintenance of standards of health and order and an independent system of inspection, reflect the need for prison personnel to set a moral example.

In April 1777, Howard's sister died, leaving him £15,000 (£2,000,000 in 2025) and her house. He used this inheritance and the revenue from the sale of her house to further his work on prisons. In 1778, he was again examined by the House of Commons, who were this time inquiring into "hulks", or prison ships. Two days after giving evidence, he was again travelling Europe, beginning in the Dutch Republic.

By 1784, Howard calculated that he had travelled over 42,000 miles (68,000 km) visiting prisons. He had been awarded an honorary LLD by the University of Dublin, and had been given the Freedom of the City of London. His fourth and final tour of English prisons began in March 1787 and two years later he published The State of the Prisons in England, and An Account of the Principal Lazarettos of Europe.

== Personality ==
Howard was considered eccentric by many of his contemporaries, and it has been advanced by psychiatrist Philip Lucas, by developmental psychologist Uta Frith, and by mathematician Ioan Mackenzie James that Howard had Asperger's syndrome (i.e., Autism Level 1). Although Howard's repeated visits evoked compassion from prison guards and led to better treatment of prisoners, he refused to compromise in his ideas for more systemic prison reform, which made it impossible to actually build his proposed rehabilitation centers. His speaking manner was rigid, and an observer described him (in 1771) as exhibiting speech patterns of "two hundred years ago." His writing style was equally rigid, and he could compose a grammatical letter only when he was imitating common forms such as thank-you letters. He was noted for responding to his son's tantrums and crying with unusual calmness, which was condemned as "severe" and "brutal" by critics, although he did not actually raise his voice or lay his hands on his child.

Howard was an evangelical Christian and expressed typical Christian sentiments for his time period.

=== Vegetarianism ===
Howard was a teetotaller and vegetarian. He became a vegetarian many years before his death. He once commented that in his London house there were "not a dozen joints of meat in seven years." He lived on a diet of milk, fruit, vegetables, butter, tea and water. As a strict vegetarian Howard had distaste for the luxuries of life. He was fond of tea and carried a kettle on his travels.

Whilst visiting Sweden, Howard found that living on a vegetarian diet was very difficult. This was because few vegetables were eaten in the winter months, and they were almost impossible to obtain. His diet was limited to coarse bread. He attributed his immunity from "gaol fever" (typhus) found in filthy prisons that he had visited to his vegetarian diet.

== Death ==
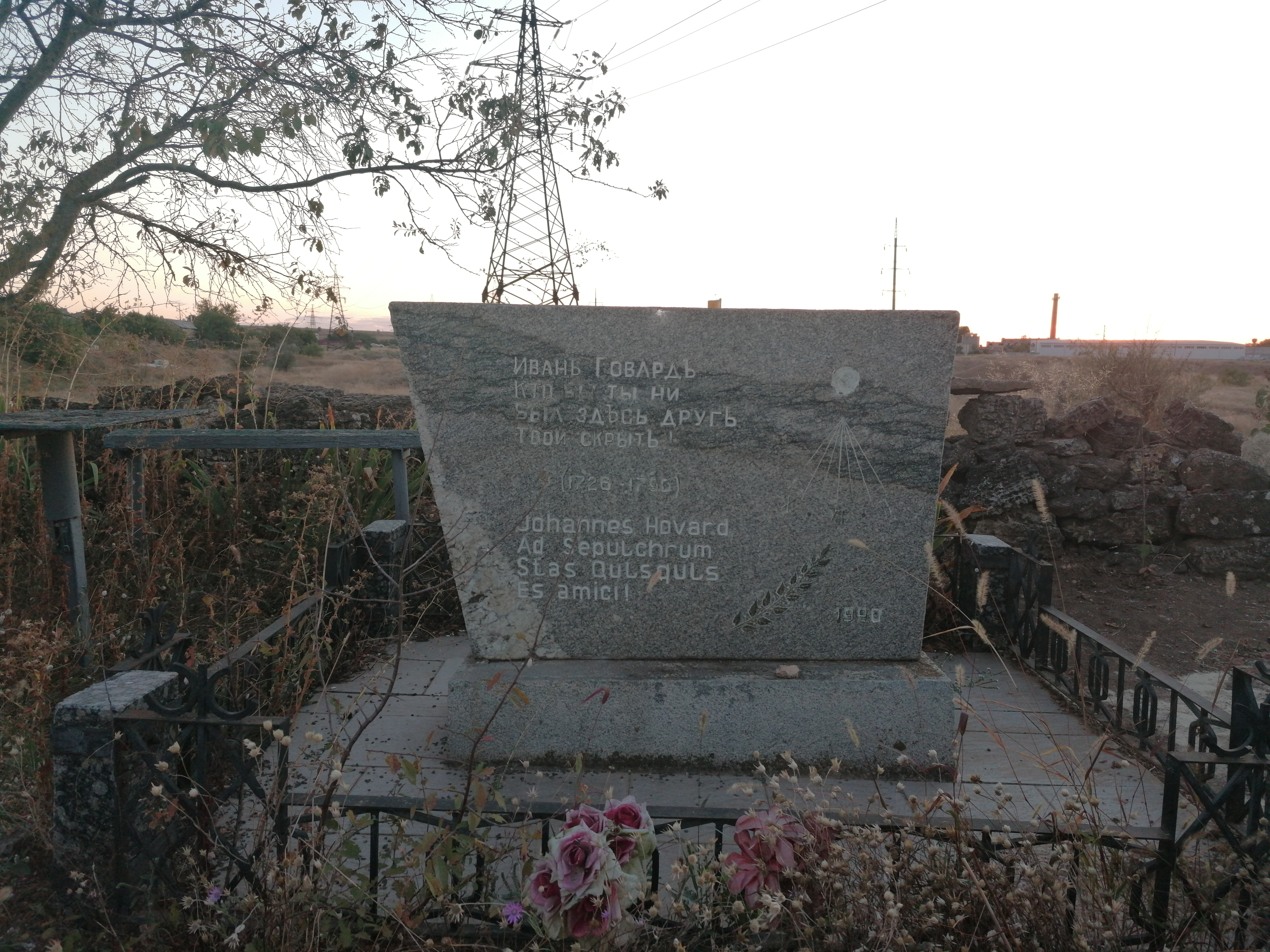
Headstone of John Howard

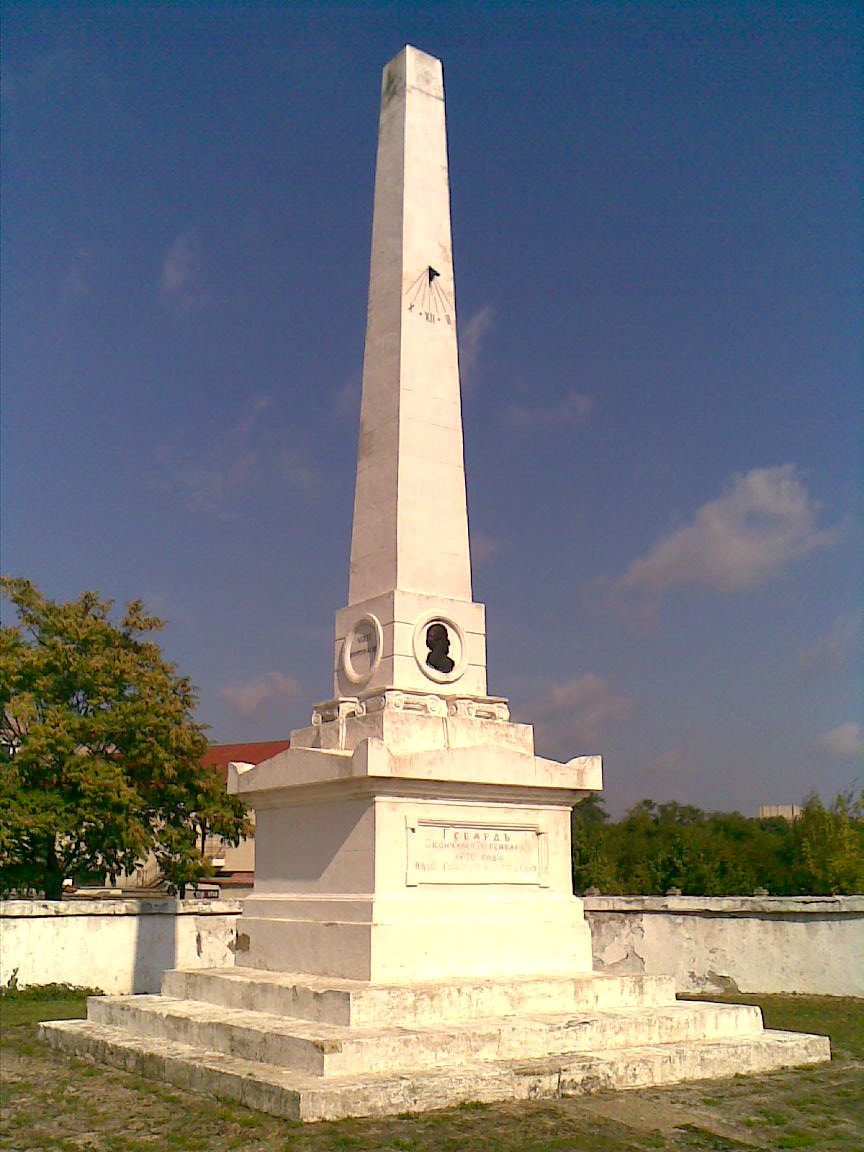
Memorial by John Haviland in Kherson.

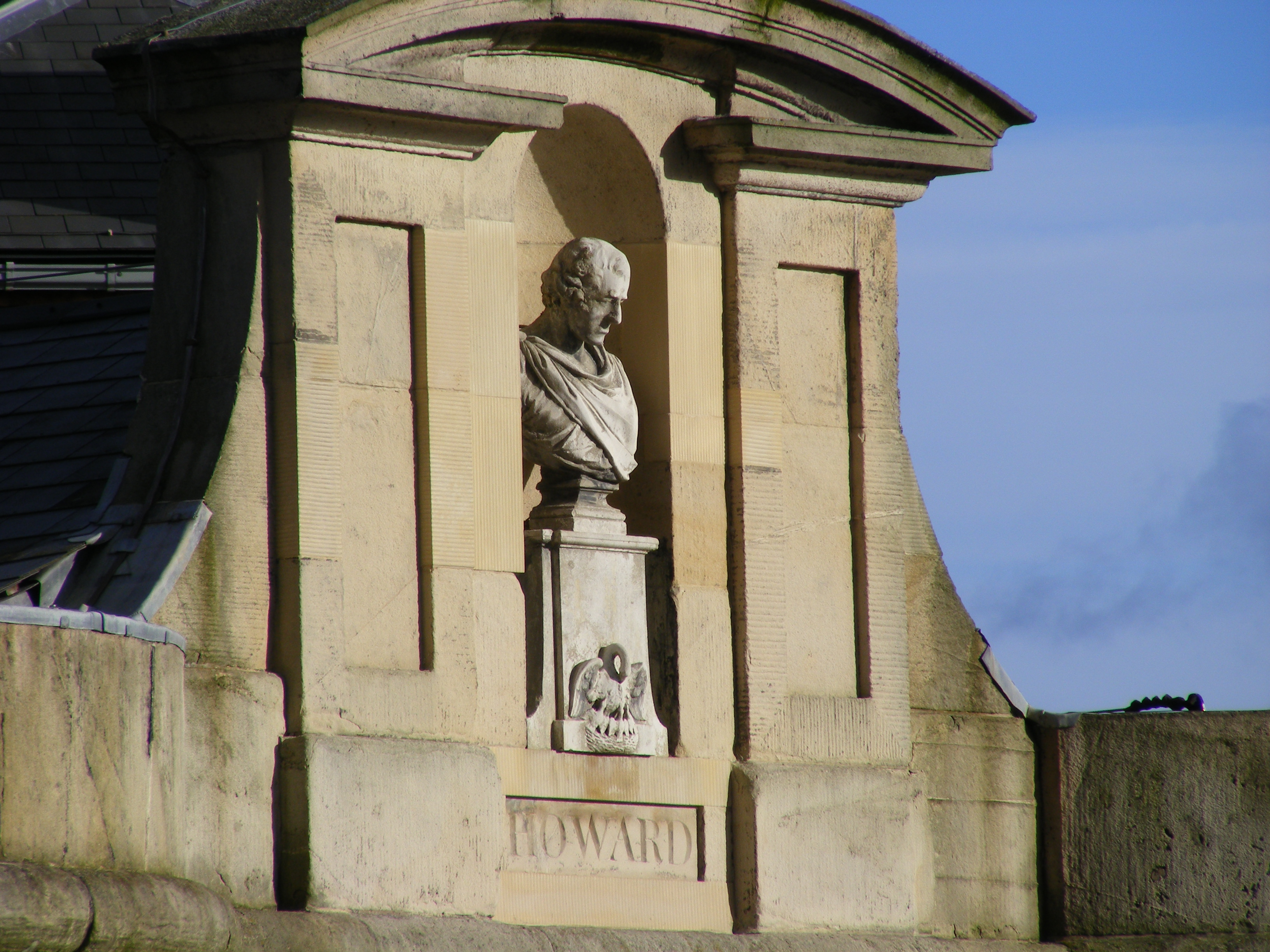
Bust of John Howard over the main entrance of Shrewsbury prison.

Howard's final journey took him into Eastern Europe, and to Crimea in the Russian Empire. Whilst visiting a prison in Kherson, he contracted typhus and died, at the age of 63. Typhus was commonly known as "gaol fever" in England at the time, due to the frequent outbreaks in prisons caused by poor and crowded conditions. Howard was buried in a walled field at Dophinovka (Stepanovka), 6 versts (6.4 km; 4.0 mi) to the north of Kherson. Despite his request for a quiet funeral, the event was elaborate and attended by Prince of Moldavia Emanuel Giani Ruset, Count Nikolay Mordvinov, and Admiral John Priestman, a British officer in service in the Imperial Russian Navy. When news of his death reached England in February 1790, a commemorative series of John Howard halfpenny Conder Tokens were struck, including one that circulated in Bath, on the reverse showing "Go forth" and "Remember the Debtors in Gaol".

== Legacy ==
=== Awards and honours ===
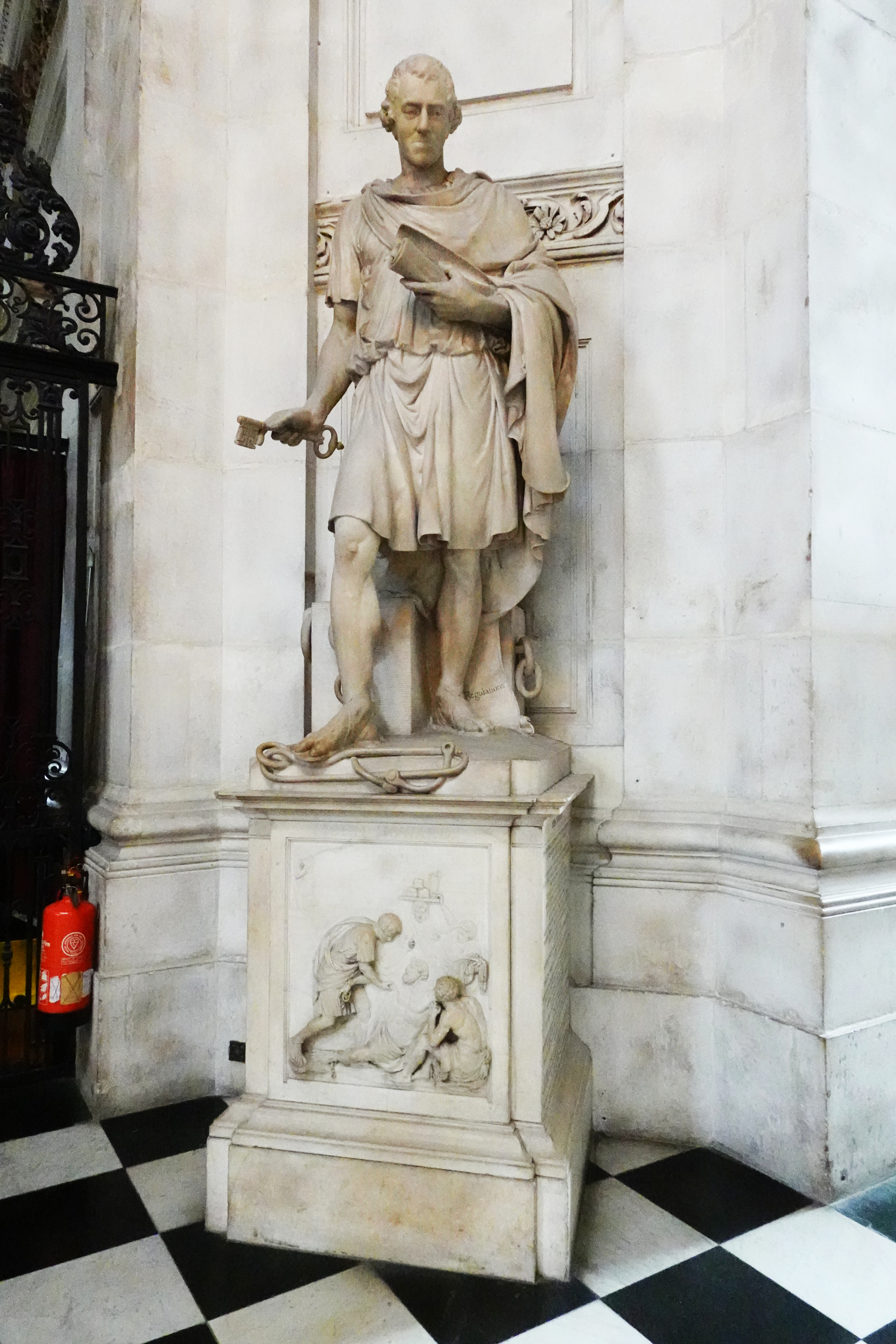
Statue of John Howard at St. Paul's Cathedral.

Howard became the first civilian to be honoured with a statue in St. Paul's Cathedral, London. A statue was also erected in Bedford, and a further one in a John Haviland-designed monument in Kherson. His bust features in the architecture of a number of Victorian prisons across the United Kingdom, such as at Shrewsbury Prison. He was elected a Foreign Honorary Member of the American Academy of Arts and Sciences in 1790.

=== Organisations ===
The Howard Association was formed in London in 1867, almost eighty years after his death, with the aim of "promotion of the most efficient means of penal treatment and crime prevention" and to promote "a reformatory and radically preventive treatment of offenders". In its first annual report, the Howard Association stated that its efforts had been focused on "the promotion of reformatory and remunerative prison labour, and the abolition of capital punishment." It merged with the Penal Reform League in 1921 to become the Howard League for Penal Reform. Today, the Howard League is Britain's biggest penal reform organisation.

John Howard's name was adopted by non-profit organizations in Canada which call themselves the John Howard Society of their given geographic area and each society seeks to develop effective, just and humane responses to crime and its consequences. There are currently over 60 John Howard societies spread across every province of Canada and the Northwest Territories.

The Howard Association, a benevolent organisation founded in 1855 in Norfolk, Virginia, United States, was also named after him. There is also a Howard League for Penal Reform in New Zealand. The John Howard Association of Illinois, formed in 1901, independently monitors correctional facilities, policies and practices, and advances reforms needed to achieve a fair, humane and effective criminal justice system in Illinois.

Samford University, located in Alabama, was founded by Baptists as Howard College in 1841. Samford's Howard College of Arts and Sciences remains part of the university.

=== Other ===
- A statue of Howard stands in London's St Paul's Cathedral, the only statue honouring an individual on the main floor of Sir Christopher Wren's building. A large bronze statue at Bedford was erected in 1890, the centenary of his death.
- A terracotta bust of John Howard is incorporated in the gatehouse of HM Prison Wormwood Scrubs, and another bust over the entrance to Shrewsbury Prison.
- The John Howard Pavilion at St. Elizabeths Hospital in Washington, D.C., is the Forensic Psychiatric Hospital for the District of Columbia. Its most notorious inmate was John Hinckley Jr., the failed assassin of then U.S. president Ronald Reagan in 1981.
- The John Howard School in Clapton, London (now Clapton Girls' Academy), was named after him.
- The town of Howard Lake, Minnesota in the United States was named in honour of John Howard in 1869

== See also ==
- Morrin Centre
- Penitentiary Act
- Sir Robert Peel

== Notes ==
Honorary titles
| Preceded by Sir Gillies Payne | High Sheriff of Bedfordshire; 1773–1774 | Succeeded by John Crawley |
