= Edward Leeds =

Edward Leeds may refer to:

- Edward Leeds (priest) (died 1590), English Reformation-era precentor
- Edward Leeds (barrister) (bapt. 1693 – 1758), English lawyer
- Sir Edward Leeds, 3rd Baronet (1825–1876), of the Leeds baronets of Croxton Park
- Sir Edward Leeds, 5th Baronet (1859–1924), of the Leeds baronets of Croxton Park
- Edward Thurlow Leeds (1877–1955), English archaeologist
- Ned Leeds, comic book character in Marvel's Spider-Man series
