= John Worsley =

John Worsley may refer to:

- John Worsley (scholar) (1696–1767), English scholar and schoolmaster
- Sir John Worsley (British Army officer) (1912–1987), British general
- John Worsley (artist) (1919–2000), British artist and illustrator
- Les Vandyke (John Worsley, 1931–2021), British singer-songwriter
