= National Grand Lodge =

Governing body of Masonry

The Most Worshipful National Grand Lodge Free & Accepted Ancient York Masons Prince Hall Origin National Compact USA (also referred to as Prince Hall Origin as well as Compact Masons) is a body of Masonry in the United States of America composed predominantly of African American Freemasons. It governs Grand Lodges within the United States and the Commonwealth of The Bahamas.

== History ==
The National Grand Lodge was established June 24, 1847 in Boston, Massachusetts by four Grand Lodges. Those Grand Lodges were the African Grand Lodge of Massachusetts, First Independent African Grand Lodge of Pennsylvania and Hiram Grand Lodge of Pennsylvania. Delegates of Boyer Lodge of New York were also a part of the June 24, 1847, convention. The primary purpose of the meeting was to heal tensions between the two Pennsylvania Grand Lodges and to unify the bodies of African American Freemasons in light of them being excluded from the predominantly white Freemasonry in the United States. The National Grand Lodge approved its Declaration of Sentiments which reads in part:

=== Sentiment Three ===
"In all stages of oppression we have petitioned for redress, but found none; therefore, in solemn convention assembled, we do, in the name of the Great Masonic Body of Free and Accepted A.Y. Masons, declare ourselves a free and independent body of Masons, to be known as the National Grand Lodge of Color of these United States of America and Masonic Jurisdiction, with full power to grant Letters of Dispensation and Warrants to all State Grand Lodges under our Jurisdiction, and that the said State Grand Lodges shall have full power to grant letters of dispensation and warrants to the subordinate Lodges under the several jurisdictions, and to establish as many Lodges as they may deem most expedient."

=== Sentiment Four ===
"Not that we have been wanting in attention to our white Brethren. We have from time to time solicited them to extend their jurisdiction over us, but to no effect. We, therefore, the delegates of the several Lodges throughout the United States, in convention assembled, appealing to the Supreme Judge of the world for the rectitude of our intentions, do in the name and by the authority of our constituents, declare and publish the said National Grand Lodge of Color of the United States to be a free and independent body, with full power, as named in third article of this declaration, and for the support of the declaration, with a firm reliance on the protection of Divine Providence, we mutually pledge ourselves to each other in the solemn ties of brotherhood."

John T. Hilton was elected the first National Grand Master and the Grand Lodges which were part of the Convention were designated to be restructured by National Grand Master Hilton. The African Grand Lodge was restructured and renamed the Right Worshipful Prince Hall Grand Lodge of Massachusetts by virtue of warrant from the National Grand Lodge.

The First Independent African Grand Lodge of Pennsylvania and Hiram Grand Lodge of Pennsylvania merged and formed the Right Worshipful Grand Lodge of Pennsylvania. All subordinates of these Grand Lodges in other states united and subsequently formed Grand Lodges all under the warrant and authority of the National Grand Lodge.

=== Schisms ===
In 1849, seven Lodges under the Right Worshipful Grand Lodge of Pennsylvania (Union Lodge No. 4, Sheba Lodge No. 7, Fidelity Lodge No. 8, Harmony Lodge No. 10, Prudence Lodge No. 11, Christian Lodge No. 12, Paxton Lodge No. 16) met at the Lodge Hall at Seventh Street in Philadelphia and voted to sever all ties with the National Grand Lodge. These Lodges along with the Grand Master of the Right Worshipful Grand Lodge of Pennsylvania, Jacob Jenkins, a month later, were "expelled" by the National Grand Lodge. In the same year the United Grand Lodge of New York was expelled by the National Grand Lodge for not recognizing the authority of the National Grand Lodge.

=== Declarations of Independence ===
In 1869, the Grand Lodge of Ohio, under the jurisdiction of the National Grand Lodge, withdrew from their authority and styled itself as an independent Grand Lodge. The Grand Lodge of Washington D.C. did the same. These two Grand Lodges were in consequence expelled by the National Grand Lodge. The Right Worshipful Grand Lodge of Ohio had far-reaching sympathy and support due to the many Lodges established by Ohio in other states. Through the influences of foreign correspondence by men such as William T. Boyd and others, many other Grand Lodges under the jurisdiction of the National Grand Lodge withdrew or engaged in mergers as independent Grand Lodges. These Grand Lodges are now styled as Prince Hall Affiliates (PHA).

=== Matthews Manifesto ===
Captain William D. Matthews, the eighth National Grand Master of the National Grand Lodge who served from 1886 to 1906, fed up with the actions of those Grand Lodges which left the National Grand Lodge, gave orders for all the Grand Lodges which withdrew to return to the fold of the National Grand Lodge or be expelled and have new Grand Masters commissioned in those particular states and re-organized and National Grand Lodge state subordinates would be established. This was popularly called the "Matthews Manifesto" and was generally ignored by those Grand Lodges that withdrew. The Grand Lodges that remained with the National Grand Lodge along with those states re-organized by Matthews following the manifesto formed what is now styled as Prince Hall Origin – National Compact (PHO).

== Lineage and Daughter Grand Lodges ==
All Grand Lodges with lineage to African Lodge No. 459 were established in either of the following ways:
a. By Warrant of the National Grand Lodge.
b. By three Lodges that were established as National Grand Lodge subordinates.
c. By merger (as Equals) of Independent and National Grand Lodges subordinate Grand Lodges.
d. Independent PHA Grand Lodges with lineage to either a., b., or c.

A report by Joshua Woodlin and is corroborated by newspaper accounts of the activities of United Grand Lodge of New York in 1848.

The following are several Prince Hall Affiliated Grand Lodges which were established by warrant of the National Grand Lodge:

The MW Prince Hall Grand Lodge of Massachusetts

The Most Worshipful Prince Hall Grand Lodge of Massachusetts was established by the National Grand Lodge in April 1848 under John T. Hilton who served as the First National Grand Master.

The MW Prince Hall Grand Lodge of Ohio

The Most Worshipful Prince Hall Grand Lodge of Ohio was established by Lodges under the National Grand Lodge in 1849 and was warranted by the National Grand Lodge June 24, 1850.

The MW Prince Hall Grand Lodge of Ontario

The Most Worshipful Grand Lodge of Ontario was established as the MW Widow's Son Grand Lodge of the Province of Ontario Canada, August 25, 1856 under warrant of the National Grand Lodge.

The MW Prince Hall Grand Lodge of Indiana

The Most Worshipful Prince Hall Grand Lodge of Indiana was established September 13, 1856 by warrant of the National Grand Lodge.

The MW Prince Hall Grand Lodge of Illinois

The Most Worshipful Prince Hall Grand Lodge of Illinois was established May 6, 1867 by Warrant of the National Grand Lodge.

The MW Prince Hall Grand Lodge of Kentucky

The Most Worshipful Prince Hall Grand Lodge of Kentucky was established by warrant of the National Grand Lodge January 31, 1867.

The MW Prince Hall Grand Lodge of North Carolina

In 1866, under authority of the Grand Lodge of New York, Past Grand Master Paul Drayton organized King Solomon Lodge #23 (now #1,) at New Bern, North Carolina, and Giblem Lodge #28 (now #2,) at Wilmington, North Carolina. By authority of the same Grand Lodge, Past Grand Master James W. Hood, who had been appointed as supervisor, organized in 1867, Eureka Lodge #30 (now #3,) at Fayetteville, North Carolina, and Widow's Son Lodge #31, (now #4,) at Raleigh, North Carolina. The four lodges last mentioned, on March 1, 1870, met in Giblem Lodge room in the city of Wilmington, and organized the present Most Worshipful Grand Lodge of the state of North Carolina with M:. W:. J:. W:. Hood, Grand Master, and R:. W:. J:. J:. Sawyer as Grand Secretary.

The MW Stringer Grand Lodge PHA of Mississippi

The Most Worshipful Stringer Grand Lodge of Mississippi was established by Warrant of the National Grand Lodge October 22, 1875.

== Current structure ==
The National Grand Lodge convenes triennially and is the legislative, executive and judicial body of all subordinates of its jurisdiction.

== Past National Grand Masters ==
The National Grand Lodge has had 21 Past National Grand Masters:

PNGM	Tenure	Grand Jurisdiction
John T. Hilton	1847–1850	Prince Hall Grand Lodge of Massachusetts
Enos Hall	1850–1856	Prince Hall Grand Lodge of Massachusetts
William A. Darnes	1856–1859	Grand Lodge of Ohio (Now MWPHGL of Ohio)
William H. Riley	1859–1862	Grand Lodge of Pennsylvania F&AAYM
Paul Drayton	1862–1865	Union Grand Lodge of New York F&AAYM
Richard Howell Gleaves	1865–1877	Grand Lodge of Ohio (Now MWPHGL of Ohio)
George W. LeVere	1877–1886	Prince Hall Grand Lodge of Tennessee F&AAYM
William D. Matthews	1887–1906	King Solomon Grand Lodge of Kansas
A. B. Allen	1906–1909	Smooth Ashlar Grand Lodge F&AAYM of Georgia
John Wesley Alstork	1909–1920	Olive Branch Grand Lodge of Alabama F&AAYM
A. R. Robinson	1920–1922	Grand Lodge of Pennsylvania F&AAYM
Square S. Simmons	1922–1941	Smooth Ashlar Grand Lodge F&AAYM of Georgia
T. H. Pinkney	1941–1942	Palmetto Grand Lodge of South Carolina
Walter L. Turner	1942–1952	Olive Branch Grand Lodge of Alabama
Milford S. Vaughn	1952–1963	St. Andrews Grand Lodge of Missouri F&AAYM
Matthew Brock	1963–1975	Eureka Grand Lodge of Ohio F&AAYM
James R. Hairston	1975–1976	Royal Craft Grand Lodge of West Virginia F&AAYM
Jefferson D. Tufts	1976–1990	Eureka Grand Lodge of Ohio F&AAYM
Oscar Mack	1990–1996	Palmetto Grand Lodge of South Carolina
Norman A. Woodard	1996–2002	Smooth Ashlar Grand Lodge F&AAYM of Georgia
Felton N. Ferguson	2002–2008	African Harmony Grand Lodge of Delaware F&AAYM
Clyde L. Shepard	2008–2014	Palmetto Grand Lodge of South Carolina
Lee E. Singleton	2014–2020	New York Grand Lodge F&AAYM
Cedric Lewis	2020–present	Prince Hall Grand Lodge of Mississippi
