= Worsley River (Western Australia) =

River in Western Australia

Coordinates: 33°20′17″S 116°01′24″E

Location
- Country: Australia

Physical characteristics
- Mouth
  - location: Collie River, Wellington Reservoir
  - elevation: 166 metres (545 ft)
- Length: 4 kilometres (2 mi)

Worsley River is a river in the South West region of Western Australia. The river rises in the Darling Range 2 kilometres (1.2 mi) south of the old timber town of Worsley then flows east and south discharging into the Collie River in Wellington Reservoir.

The Worsley River was named after Charles Anderson-Pelham, Lord Worsley, patron of the Western Australian Land and Emigration Committee, which included James Stirling, John Hutt, William Hutt (MP), Edward Barrett-Lennard and Captain Bunbury. The committee promoted emigration to the Swan River colony and the Western Australian Land Company, which established the Australind land settlement project in 1841 under Marshall Waller Clifton. The name was first recorded in surveys performed in the area in 1845.

The Worsley has no named tributaries.
