= Single-celling =

Assigning one inmate to a prison cell

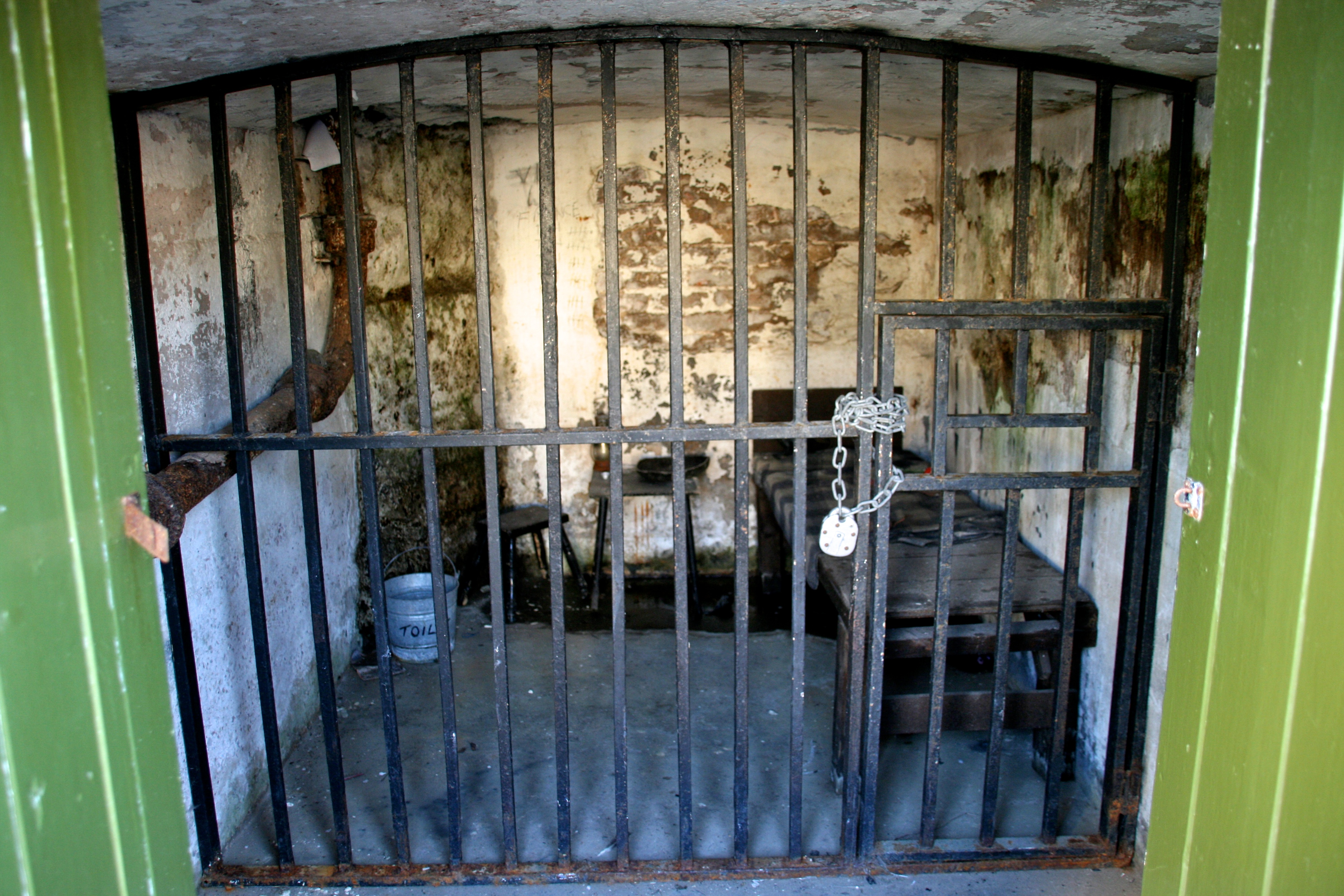
A prison cell designed for a single inmate

Single-celling is the practice of assigning only one inmate to each cell in a prison.

John Howard has been credited as establishing the practice of single-celling in the United Kingdom and, by extension, in the United States. In 1957, only 15 prisons in the United States practiced single-celling exclusively while 41 prisons employed it with a portion of their cells and 44 housed multiple prisoners in all of their cells.

Critics of single-celling suggest that the practice imposes psychologically harmful isolation on inmates, while advocates argue that single-celling alleviates many of the inmates' discomforts. The practice in many prisons of allowing general population prisoners to freely intermingle during normal hours diminishes the critics argument, while single celling gives prisoners a (relatively) safe place to retreat.

The majority of cells allow the cell doors to be closed by an inmate and automatically lock. This provides additional security to potentially at-risk individuals. Single celling also improves investigations of contraband possession since only a single inmate is assigned to a cell.

== See also ==
- Solitary confinement
