= Israel Worsley =

English Unitarian minister

Israel Worsley (1768−1836) was an English Unitarian minister.

Born at Hertford in 1768, Israel Worsley entered at Daventry Academy in 1786, under Thomas Belsham who made him a Unitarian.

In December 1790 a committee of merchants at Dunkirk (a French port where there was no English service) engaged Worsley as their minister, the services to be conducted with a ‘Book of Common Prayer compiled for the use of the English Church at Dunkirk . . . with a Collection of Psalms,’' Dunkirk, 1791, 12mo. The volume was reprinted in Fragmenta Liturgica (1848, vol. vi.) by Peter Hall, who seemed unaware that it was itself a reprint of the ‘reformed’ prayer book of Theophilus Lindsey. How long this experiment lasted is not certain. Worsley established a school at Dunkirk.

After the outbreak of the war between Britain and France in 1793 he made his way to England, but returned after the peace of Amiens (1802), only to be arrested on the resumption of hostilities (1803), ultimately making his escape with difficulty through the Netherlands. From 1806 to 1813 he ministered at Lincoln, and from 1813 to February 1831 at Plymouth, where he established a fellowship fund and a chapel library. He left Plymouth with his family for Paris, intending a six months' stay, but was persuaded to open (in June) a place for Unitarian worship (in the Rue de Provence). In January 1832 he formed a French Unitarian association for circulation of tracts. The cholera of March 1832 dispersed his congregation, but he kept his chapel open till June 1833. Returning to England, he again ministered at Lincoln (1833−6).

== Bibliography ==
Besides sermons, tracts, and school-books, Worsley published:

1. Account of the State of France . . . and the Treatment of the English, 1806.
2. Memoir of Jacob Brettell, Lincoln, 1810.
3. Observations on ... Changes in the Presbyterian Societies of England 1816 (valuable for Unitarian history).
4. Lectures on ... Nonconformity, 1823; 2nd edit. 1825.
5. View of the American Indians . . . the Descendants of the Ten Tribes of Israel, 1828.

== Family ==
His grandfather, John Worsley (d. 16 Dec. 1767), was for fifty years a successful schoolmaster at Hertford, and author of grammatical tables (1736, 8vo) and of an able translation of the New Testament, published posthumously by subscription (1770, 8vo), edited by Matthew Bradshaw and the author's son, Samuel Worsley (d. 7 March 1800).

Israel's father, John Worsley, who died at High Wycombe. Buckinghamshire, in 1807 (Monthly Repository, 1808, p. 515), had continued the school at Hertford for thirty years, with less success, being too easy a disciplinarian; he published a Latin grammar (1771, 8vo).

Israel Worsley died at Le Havre on 3 Sept. 1836. His son, William Worsley (1796−1881), was B.A. Glasgow 1816, studied at Manchester College 1816−19, and was Unitarian minister at Thorne (1819−22), Hull (1822−25), and Gainsborough (1825−1875).
