= Worsley, Western Australia =

Worsley
- Town
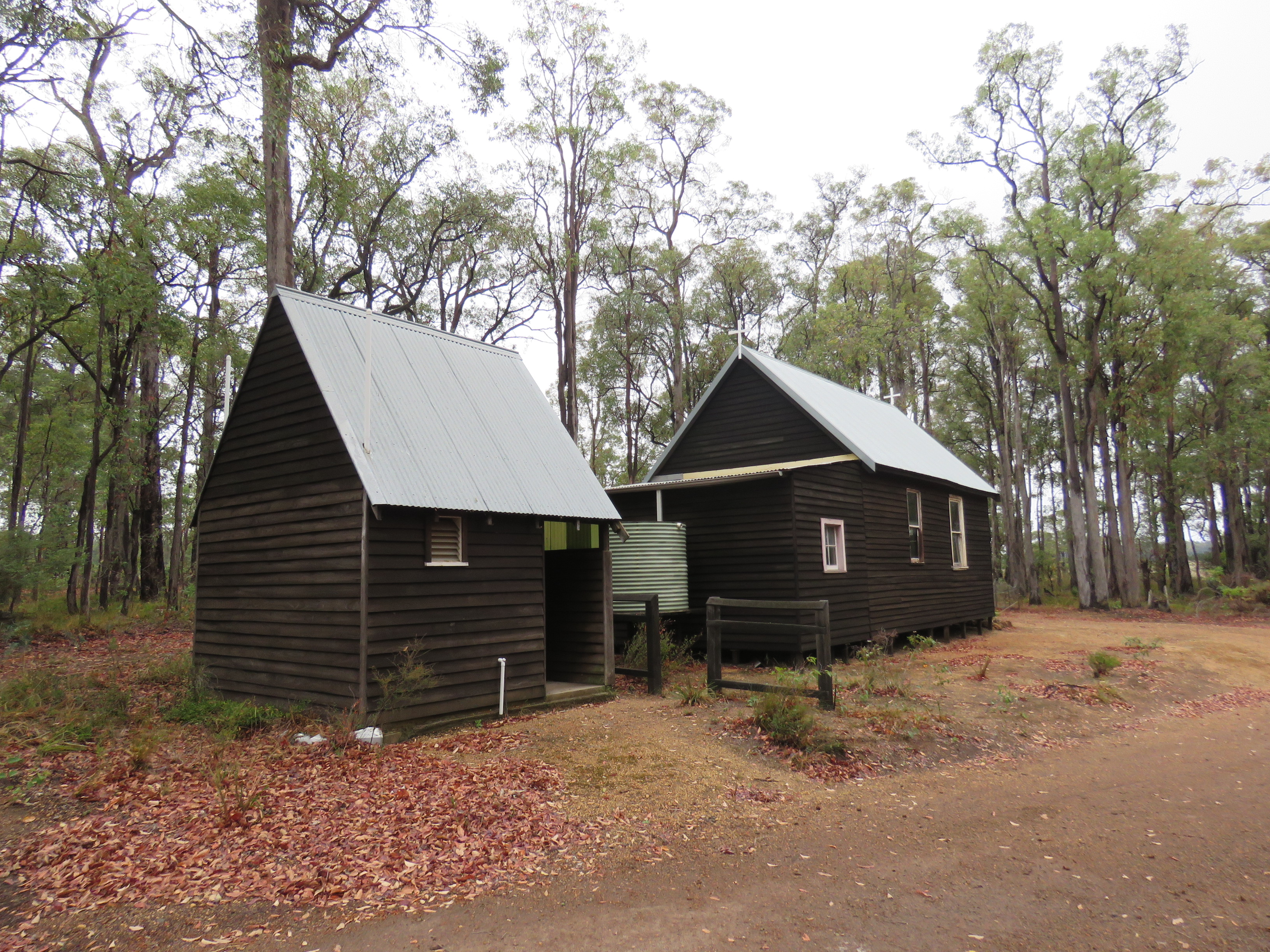
- The St David's Church in Worsley in April 2022

- Interactive map of Worsley
- Coordinates: 33.31°S 116.0°E
- Country: Australia
- State: Western Australia
- LGA: Shire of Collie
- Location: 189 km (117 mi) SSE of Perth; 13 km (8.1 mi) NW of Collie
- Established: 1909

Government
  - State electorate: Collie-Preston
  - Federal division: O'Connor

Area
  - Total: 212.9 km^{2} (82.2 sq mi)
- Elevation: 194 m (636 ft)

Population
  - Total: 39 (SAL 2021)
- Postcode: 6225
Localities around Worsley
Brunswick Junction	Mornington	Harris River
Roelands	Worsley	Allanson
Wellington Forest	Wellington Forest	Mungalup

Worsley is a town in Western Australia located in the South West region near the town of Collie. The town is within the Shire of Collie.

The town's name comes from the Worsley River, a tributary of the Collie River, which is located nearby. The river was named after Charles Anderson-Pelham, Lord Worsley, a member of the Western Australian Land and Emigration Committee, which also included James Stirling, John Hutt, William Hutt (MP), Edward Barrett-Lennard and Captain Bunbury. The committee promoted emigration to the Swan River colony and the Western Australian Land Company, which established the Australind land settlement project in 1841 under Marshall Waller Clifton. The name was first recorded in surveys performed in the area in 1845.

In the 1890s a railway siding was constructed in the area to service the timber industry, and later in 1906 the state government decided to create a town-site in the area. Lots were surveyed in 1907 and the town was gazetted in 1909. The town peaked in 1902 when its population was in excess of 1,500 people but it began to decline in the 1920s and saw the town all but disappear by the 1950s.

In 1984 construction of the Worsley Alumina refinery began and the area experienced an unexpected revival. The refinery and mine are a joint venture operation between South32 (86%), Japan Alumina Associates (Australia) Pty Ltd (10%) and Sojitz Alumina Pty Ltd (4%). Bauxite ore is delivered to the refinery by a 51 km (32 mi) conveyor belt from the Boddington Bauxite Mine site at Mount Saddleback south of Boddington.
