= Prison cell =

Small room in a prison or police station where a prisoner is held

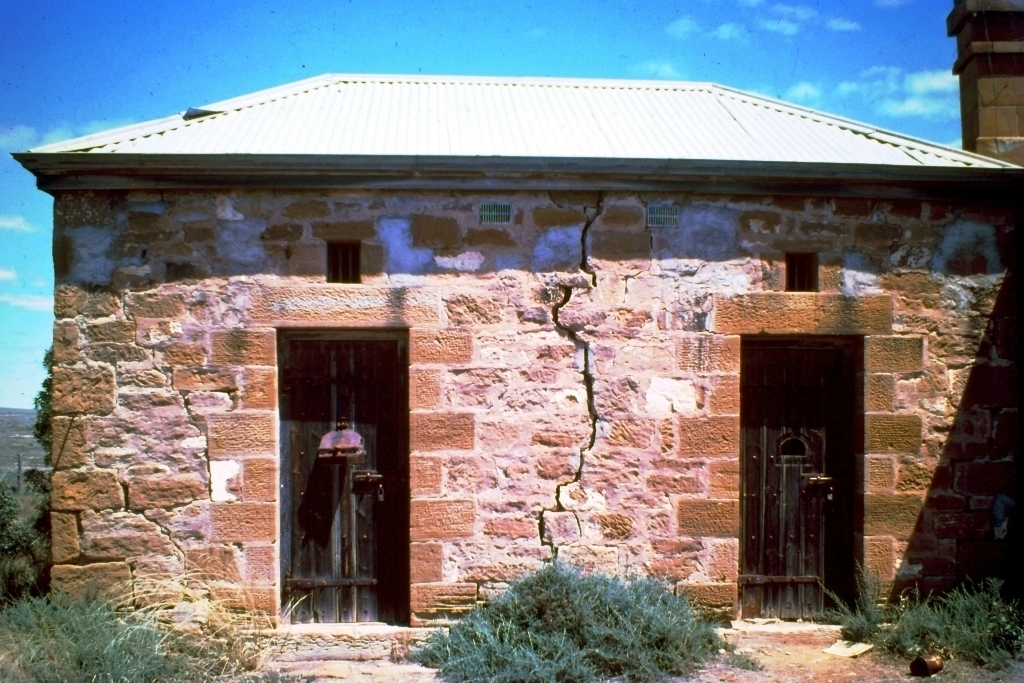
Old prison cells near Mootwingee County, NSW. 1976

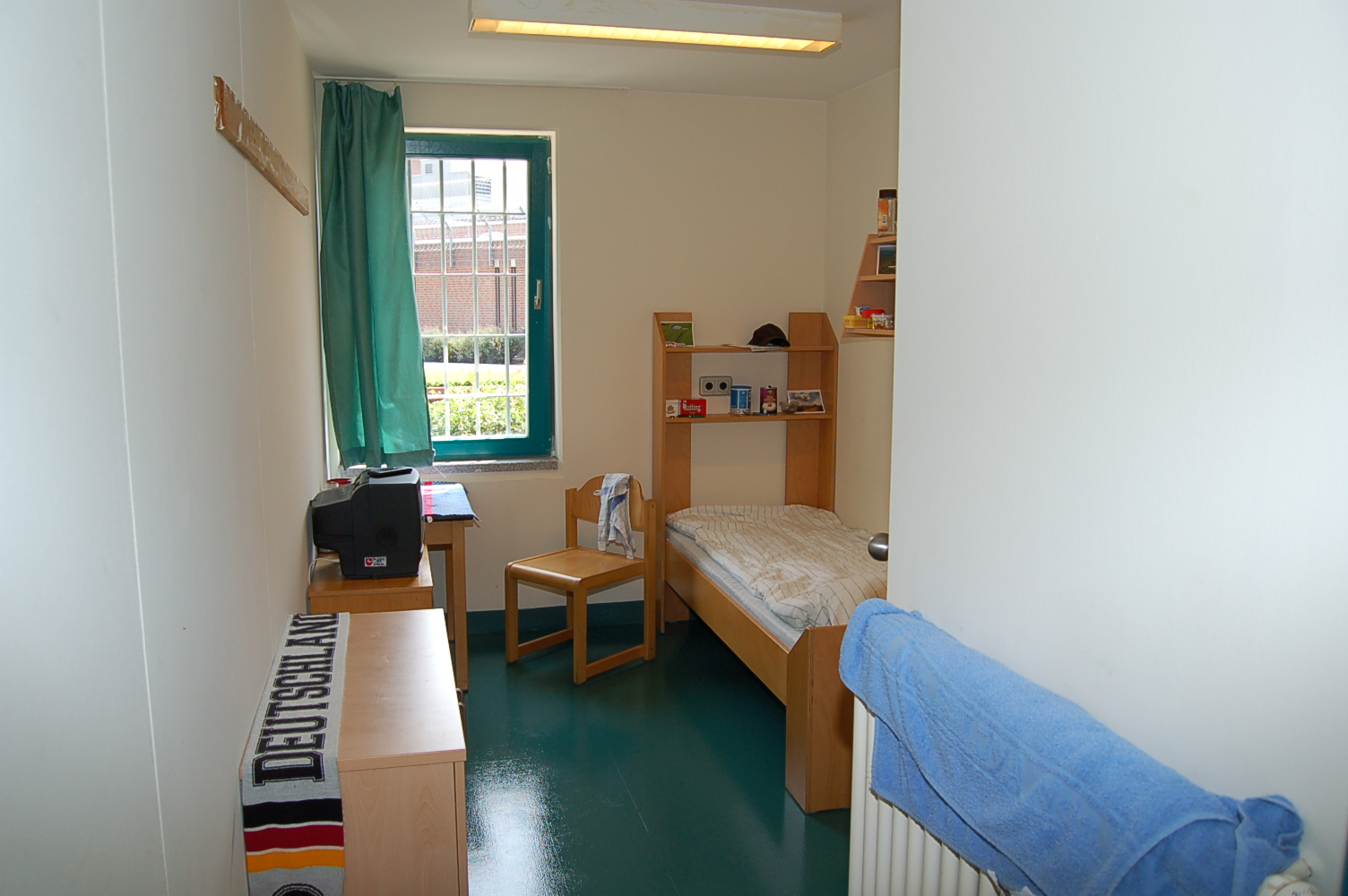
A contemporary prison cell in Germany

A prison cell (also known as a jail cell) is a small room in a prison or police station where a prisoner is held. Cells greatly vary by their furnishings, hygienic services, and cleanliness, both across countries and based on the level of punishment to which the prisoner being held has been sentenced. Cells can be occupied by one or multiple prisoners depending on factors that include, but are not limited to, inmate population, facility size, resources, or inmate behavior.

== Description ==
The International Committee of the Red Cross recommends that cells be at least 5.4 m^{2} (58 sq ft) in size for a single cell accommodation (one person in the cell). However, in shared or dormitory accommodations, it recommends a minimum of 3.4 m^{2} (37 sq ft) per person, including in cells where bunk beds are used.

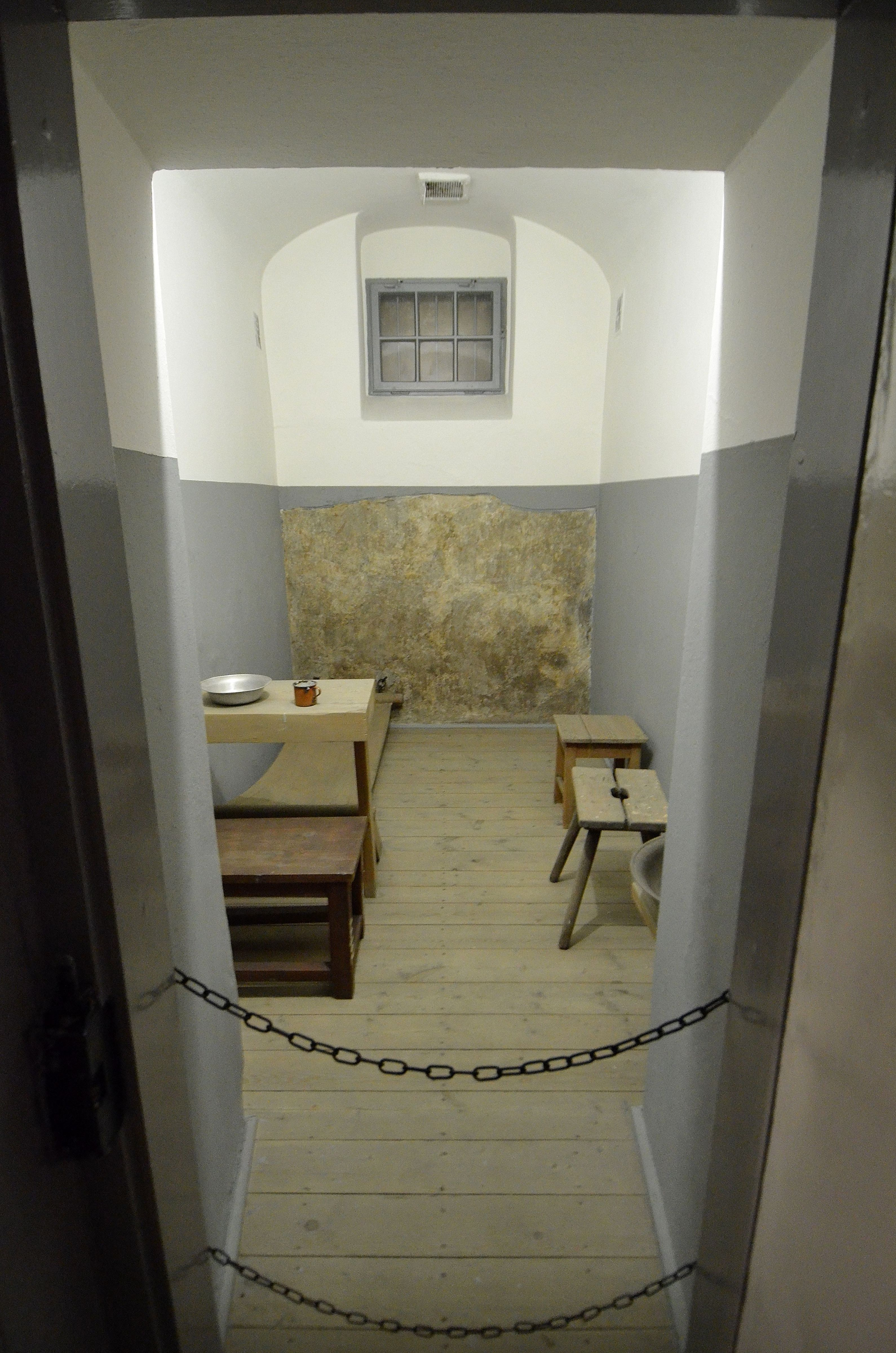
19th century prison cell in Pawiak, Warsaw

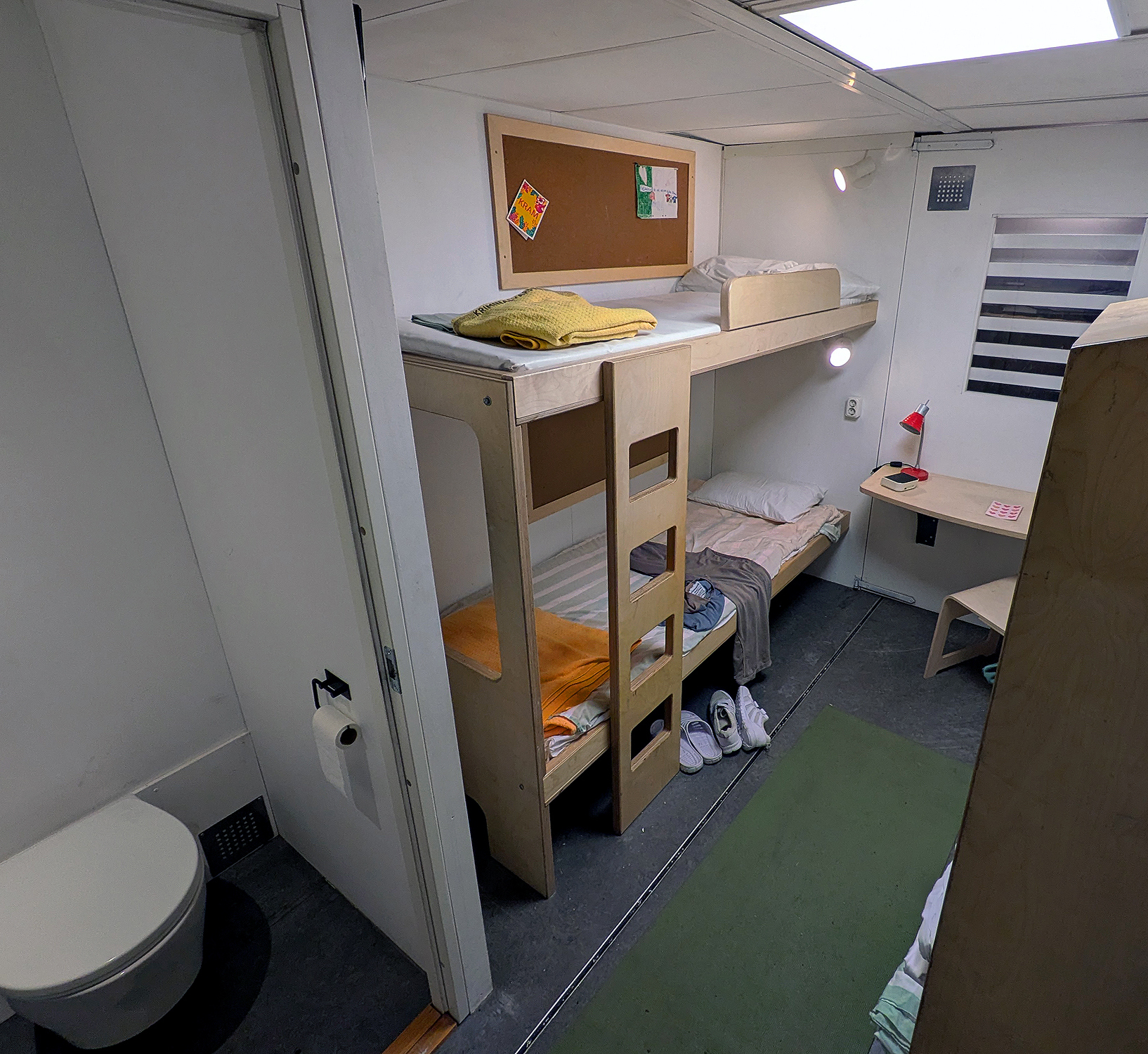
A typical cell in a Swedish prison in 2025, at the wall to the toilet the inmates each have a TV.

Prison cells vary in size internationally from 2 m^{2} (22 sq ft) in Guinea, 3 m^{2} (32 sq ft) in Poland, 9 m^{2} (97 sq ft) in Germany to 10 m^{2} (110 sq ft) in Norway and 12 m^{2} (130 sq ft) in Switzerland.

Council of Europe (Strasbourg, 15 December 2015) call for a minimum standard for personal living space in prison establishments is 6 m^{2} of living space for a single-occupancy cell or 4 m^{2} (43 sq ft) of living space per prisoner in a multiple-occupancy cell for the prevention of torture and inhuman treatment.

A March 1991 federal government study of U.S. prisons reported that:

"Until recently, the Federal Bureau of Prisons based its determination of rated capacity in existing facilities on a single-bunking standard, which currently calls for providing each inmate with at least 35 square feet of unencumbered space in a single cell. This essentially translates to a cell size of roughly 65 sq ft (6.0 m^{2}).*

*(65 sq ft (6.0 m^{2}), minus 35 sq ft (3.3 m^{2}) of "unencumbered space" leaves 30 sq ft (2.8 m^{2}) of "encumbered" space, which would likely contain bed, toilet and sink - for a single inmate in a single cell)

"In practice, however, BOP has accommodated inmate population increases by double-bunking inmates in virtually all its facilities and in cells... of varying sizes, but generally in the 50 to 70 square foot range."

In the United States old prison cells are usually about 6 by 8 feet (1.8 by 2.4 m) in dimension which is 48 sq ft (4.5 m^{2}), (moreover, however, American Correctional Association standards call for a minimum of 70 sq ft (6.5 m^{2}), with steel or brick walls and one solid or barred door that locks from the outside. Many modern prison cells are pre-cast. Solid doors typically have a window that allows the prisoner to be observed from the outside.

Furnishings and fixtures inside the cell are constructed so that they cannot be easily broken, and are anchored to the walls or floor. Stainless steel lavatories and commodes are also used. This prevents vandalism or the making of weapons.

There are a number of prison and prison cell configurations, from simple police-station holding cells to massive cell blocks in larger correctional facilities. The practice of assigning only one inmate to each cell in a prison is called single-celling or "single-bunking" (as in "bunk bed"). The practice of putting two persons to a cell is referred to as "double-bunking."

In many countries, the cells are dirty and have very few facilities. Other countries may house many offenders in prisons, making the cells crowded.

== Prison cells in the UK ==
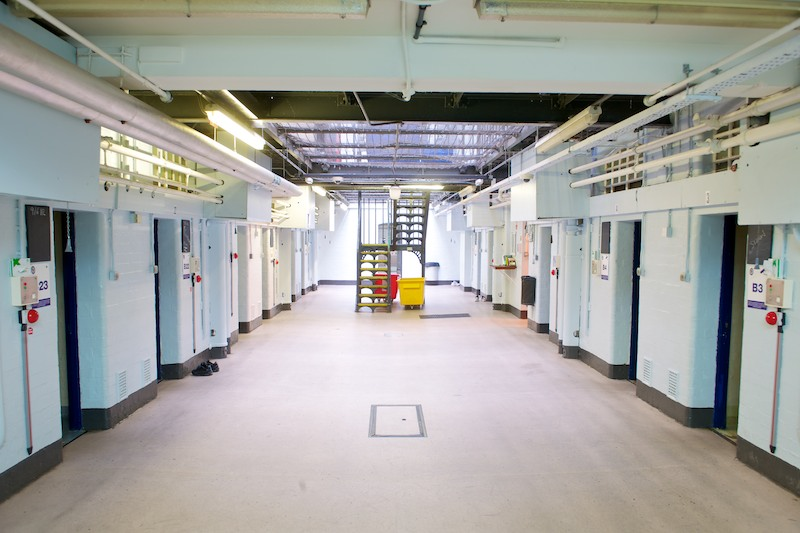
Police cells in Birmingham, England

In the United Kingdom, cells in a police station are the responsibility of the custody sergeant, who also logs each detainee and allocates him or her an available cell. Custody sergeants also ensure cells are clean and as germ-free as possible, in accordance with the Human Rights Act of 1998.

== Prison cells in the US ==
Typical cell at ADX Florence

In the United States, the standard cell is equipped with either a ledge or a steel bedstead that holds a mattress. A one-piece sink/toilet constructed of welded, putatively stainless steel is also provided. Bars typify older jails, while newer ones have doors that typically feature a small safety glass window and, often, a metal flap that can be opened to serve meals.

A limited number of prisons in Southern California offer upgrades. Costing around $100 a night, these cells are considered cleaner and quieter, and some of them offer extra facilities and\or privileges.

== High-security cells ==
Often, different standards for cells exist in a single country and even in a single jail. Some of those cells are reserved for "isolation", where a convict is kept alone in a cell as punishment method. Some isolation cells contain no furnishing and no services at all.
