= Statue of John Howard, Bedford =

Statue in Bedford, England

Statue of John Howard
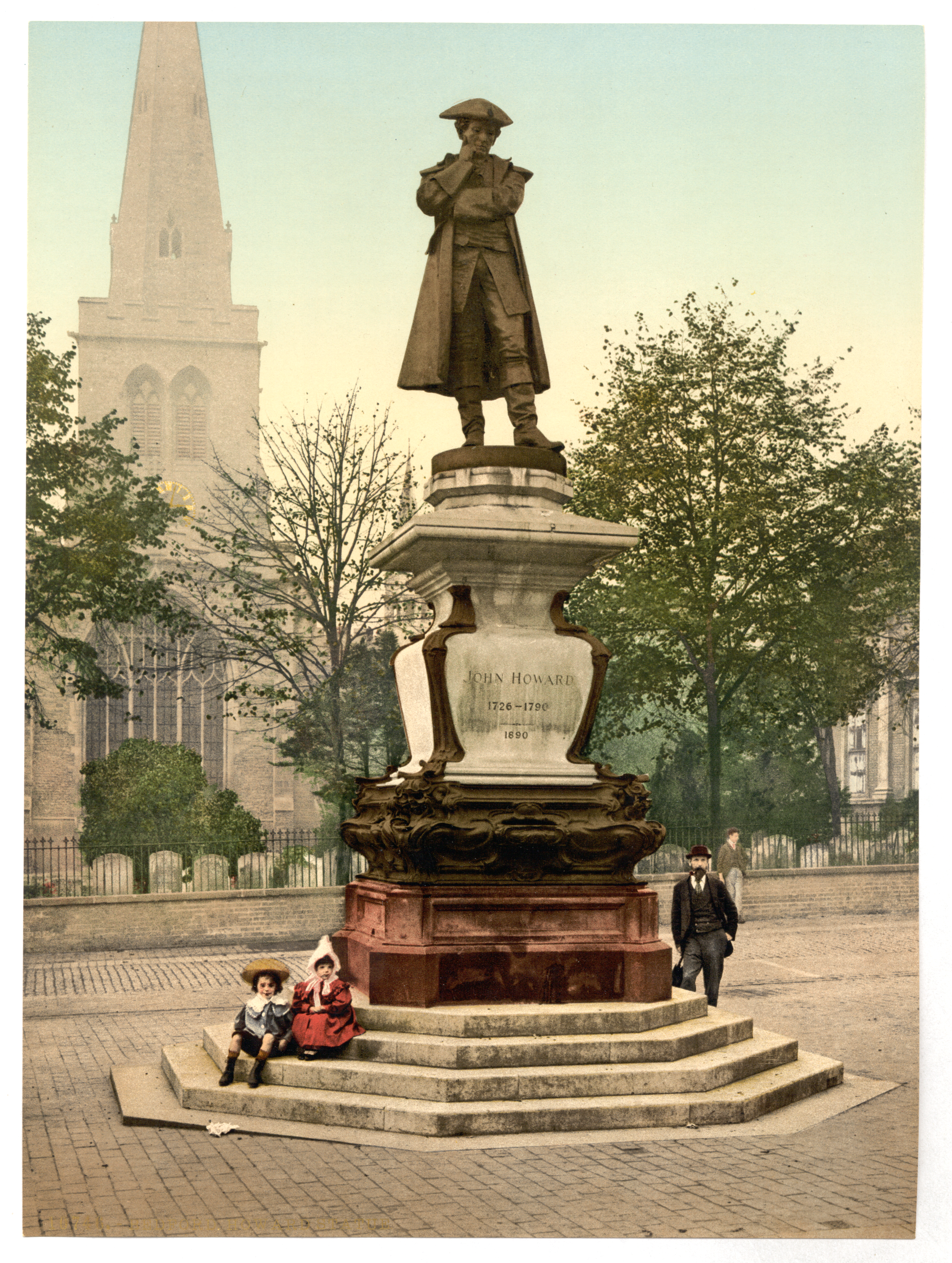
- A (probably hand coloured) photolithograph of the statue from c.1895

- Location within Bedfordshire
- Artist: Alfred Gilbert
- Year: 1890
- Medium: Bronze
- Subject: John Howard
- Dimensions: 6.1 m (20 ft)
- Designation: Grade I listed
- Location: St Pauls's Square, Bedford; 52°08′08″N 0°27′59″W

The statue of John Howard, in St Pauls's Square, Bedford, is a bronze of John Howard, erected in 1890, the centenary of Howard's death. The statue is "clothed ... in the travelling dress of the time to denote he was a great traveller." The sculptor was Alfred Gilbert.

It stands on an ornate plinth inscribed with his date of birth and death, and the date of the statue's erection. The plinth in turn sits on five octagonal stone steps, raising the total height of the monument to about 20 feet (6.1 m). The statue is a Grade I listed structure.

== History ==
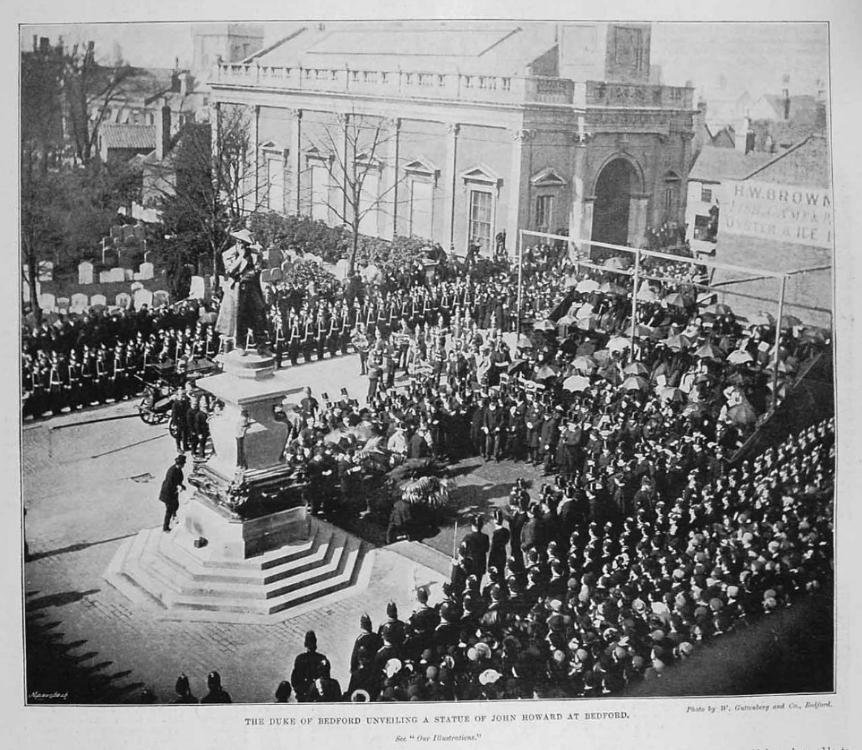
The unveiling of the statue

A previous memorial to Howard erected c. 1820 in Kherson, in modern-day Ukraine, where he died, had fallen into disrepair. In 1889 the Howard Memorial Committee was formed. The committee selected the Market Square as the location for the monument, and Alfred Gilbert as the sculptor.

The Market Square was previously the location of a drinking fountain, designed by John Usher, that had been presented to the town by Thomas Wesley Turnley (solicitor, 1809-1875), erected in 1870 and demolished in 1880. The steps of the drinking fountain were re-used and upon them the plinth was raised.

The statue was unveiled on the 28 March 1894 by Herbrand Russell, 11th Duke of Bedford. The Rifle Volunteers formed a square and the Bedford Volunteer Fire Brigade was in attendance with a steam fire engine. Gilbert refused to attend, as he had done with the unveiling of the Shaftesbury Memorial Fountain in 1893.

Historic England designated the statue as a Grade I listed structure, its highest grade, in 1971.

== Sculptor ==
Alfred Gilbert (1854–1934) was a student of Sir Joseph Edgar Boehm, whose Statue of John Bunyan is nearby. Gilbert is famed for his aluminium Shaftesbury Memorial Fountain, commonly called Eros but actually of his brother Anteros, in Piccadilly Circus in London.

Chandler Rathfon Post commented that the statue, along with the fountain in Piccadilly, "are as remarkable for the decorative detail of their pedestals as for their principal figures."

== Subject ==
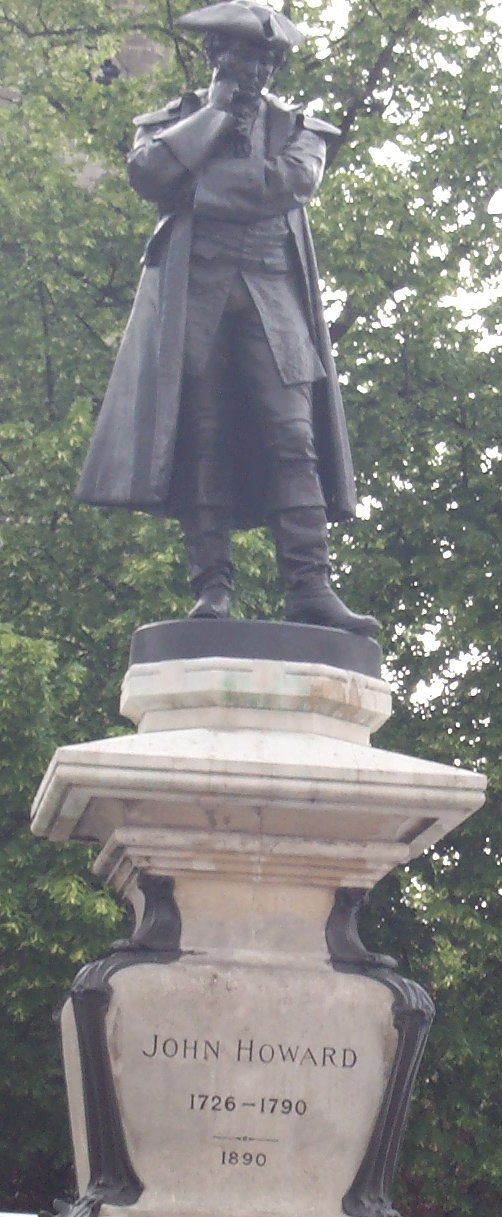
The statue more recently

John Howard (1726–1790), born in North London (either Hackney or Enfield), was brought up in Cardington, Bedfordshire, where his father's property was. In 1773 he became High Sheriff of Bedfordshire and, upon discovering the state of the prisons, began a lifelong work of reform, spending a large part of his wealth and a great deal of time travelling over 50,000 miles investigating and reporting on the conditions of prisons across Britain and later Europe.

The House of Commons heard his evidence on several occasions. In 1777 he published State of the Prisons in England and Wales, and an Account of some Foreign Prisons. He died in 1790, camp fever while travelling in southern Russia.

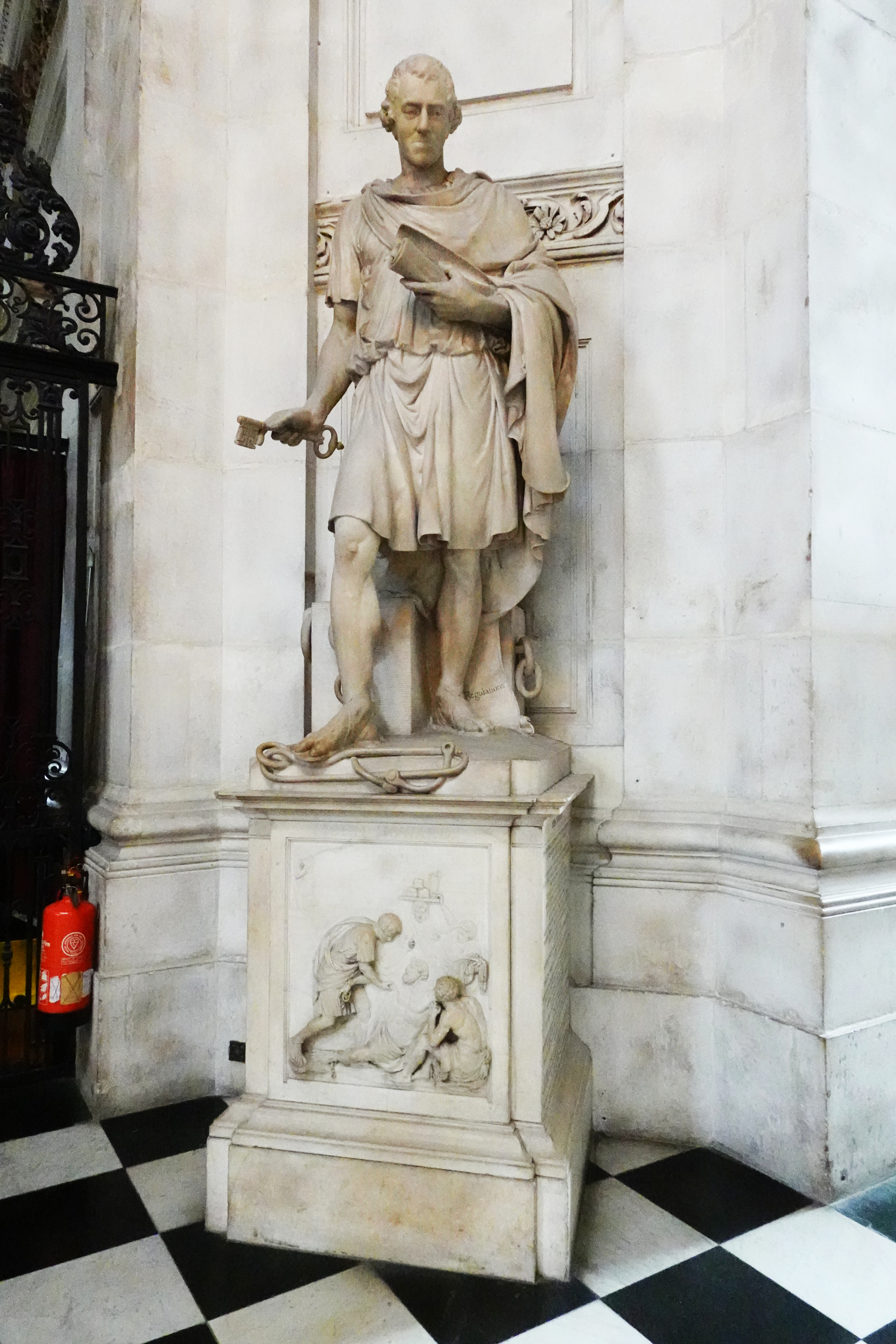
Statue of John Howard at St. Paul's Cathedral.

Howard was active in the non-conformist movement in Bedford and is also commemorated locally in Howard House, where he stayed, and in the Howard Chapel which, in 1772, he helped to found.

The Howard League for Penal Reform is named after him. He is also commemorated by a statue in St Paul's Cathedral.

== See also ==
- Statue of John Howard, St Paul's Cathedral
