= Theological Building-A.M.E. Zion Theological Institute =

Historic church in Alabama, United States

- Theological Building–A.M.E. Zion Theological Institute
- U.S. National Register of Historic Places
- Alabama Register of Landmarks and Heritage
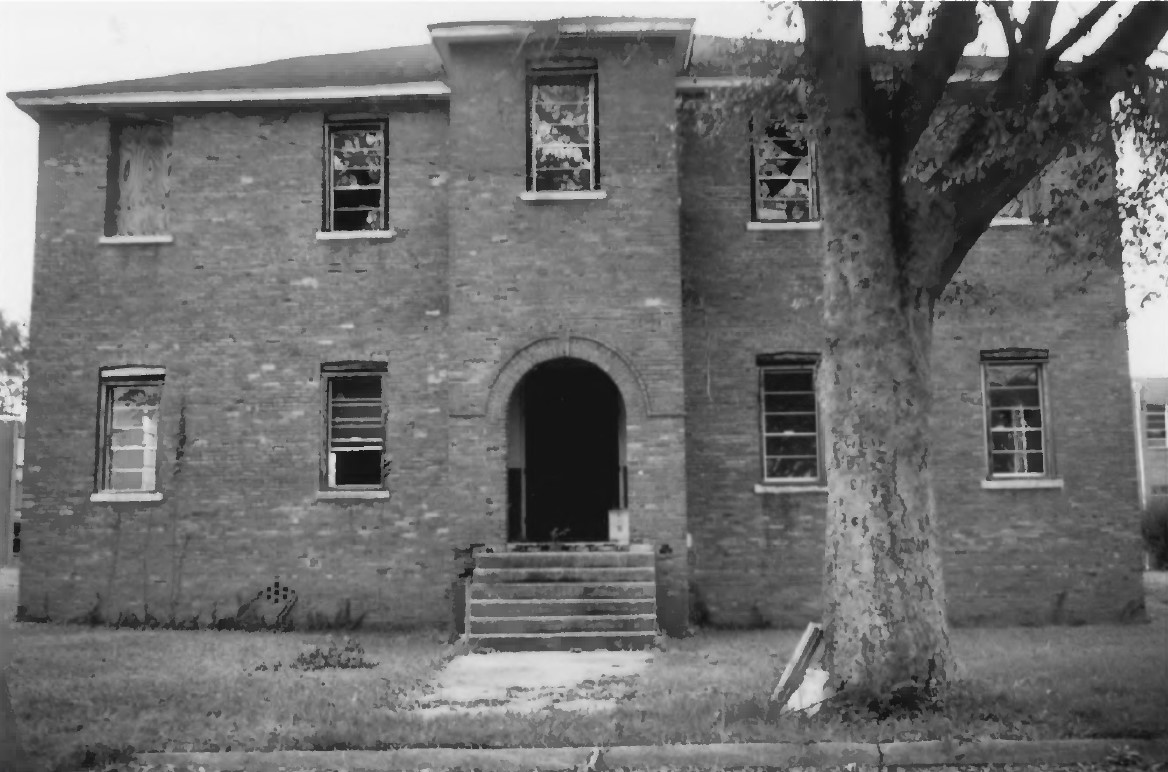
- Theological Building in 1986

- Location within Alabama Location within the United States
- Location: E. Conecuh St., Greenville, Butler County, Alabama
- Coordinates: 31°48′54″N 86°36′48″W
- Area: less than one acre
- Built: 1911
- MPS: Greenville MRA
- NRHP reference No.: 86001867

Significant dates
- Added to NRHP: September 4, 1986
- Designated ARLH: March 29, 1977

The Theological Building at A.M.E. Zion Theological Institute was a historic African Methodist Episcopal Zion Church school building on East Conecuh Street in Greenville, Alabama, United States. This later became part of Lomax-Hannon Junior College. The building was built in 1911 and added to the National Register of Historic Places in 1986. The Theological Building was demolished in 2014.

== History ==
Bishop John Wesley Alstork had been an active member of the local African Methodist Episcopal Zion Church (A.M.E. Zion Church), and he founded the A.M.E. Zion Theological Institute in 1898, which contained the Theological Building that was built in 1911. The former A.M.E. Zion Theological Institute campus is now the campus of Lomax-Hannon Junior College.
