= John Wesley Alstork =

African American bishop, community organizer (1852–1920)

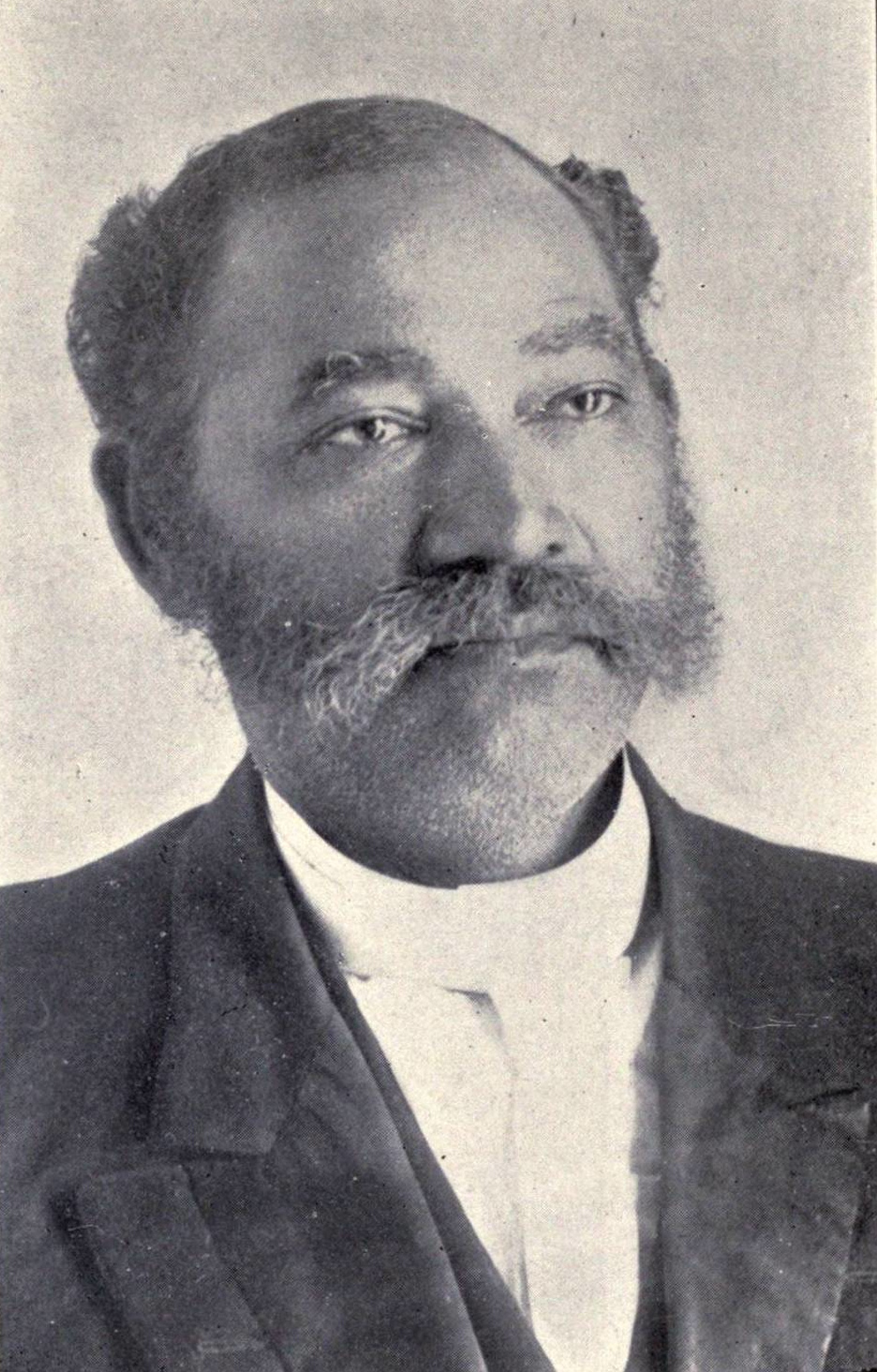
- Born: September 1, 1852; Talladega, Alabama
- Died: July 23, 1920 (aged 67); Searcy, Alabama
- Occupation(s): African American bishop and community organizer

John Wesley Alstork (September 1, 1852 – July 23, 1920) was an American religious leader and African-American community organizer. He was a preacher and bishop in the African Methodist Episcopal Zion Church (A.M.E. Zion Church) and is considered one of the most successful bishops of his church, in part due to his skills at organizing national conferences. He also was a trustee at several schools for African-Americans, and a businessman. He lived in Montgomery, Alabama.

== Early life ==
John Wesley Alstork was born on September 1, 1852, in Talladega, Alabama. Early in his life he attended the Longwood Institute, followed by study at Talladega College. He worked as a teacher after graduation. In 1873, he joined the African Methodist Episcopal Zion Church (A.M.E. Zion Church), and was ordained four years later.

== Career ==
He was a trustee for several schools for African-Americans, and he emphasized the need for industrial education and training. Alstork founded the Greenville High School in Greenville, Alabama. In 1898, he founded Lomax Hannon College (first named as A.M.E. Zion Theological Institute; now named Lomax-Hannon Junior College in Greenville).

He received an honorary degree at Livingstone College; and was honored by Talladega College, which was bestowed by Booker T. Washington. Two United States presidents consulted with Alstork, William McKinley and Theodore Roosevelt. Engravings of him appear in a book published about the history of the A.M.E. Zion Church, One Hundred Years of the African Methodist Episcopal Zion Church by J. W. Hood (1895).

His last speech drew 10,000 people in the audience. Alstork died on July 23, 1920, in Searcy, Alabama, and is buried in Oak Hill Cemetery (now Oakwood Cemetery) in Montgomery, Alabama. His funeral procession was 15 blocks long. In 1953, Bishop William Jacob Walls paid public tribute to Alstork and asked his followers to invest in improvements for Lomax Hannon College which was described as "the soul of the late Bishop".

== See also ==
- National Grand Lodge
- Butler Chapel A.M.E. Zion Church (Greenville, Alabama)
- Religion of black Americans
