= Worsley Alumina =

Alumina mine and refinery in Western Australia

- Location in Western Australia
- Interactive map of Worsley Alumina
- Location: Worsley, Western Australia, Western Australia, Australia; 33°13′45″S 116°04′36″E
- Products: Alumina
- Production: 4,377 kilotonnes (9.6 billion pounds)
- Financial year: 2018
- Type: Open pit
- Opened: 1984
- Company: South32 (86%) Japan Alumina Associated (10%) Sojitz Alumina Pty Ltd (4%)
- Website: www.south32.net/our-operations/australia/worsley-alumina
- Acquired: 2015

Worsley Alumina comprises a bauxite mine located near the town of Boddington and an Alumina refinery located near Worsley. Ore is mined then transported 50 km (31 mi) to the refinery via an overland conveyor system. Alumina is then transported 55 km (34 mi) to the port of Bunbury for shipping.

== Bauxite Mine ==
The Boddington Bauxite Mine is located south of the town of Boddington, and comprises the two sites of Saddleback and Marradong. The orebody exists as a hardcap layer of between 2–12 metres (6 ft 7 in – 39 ft 4 in) thick, it is drilled and blasted before bulldozers can access the softer ore below. The ore is first crushed to a diameter less than 18 cm (7.1 in) before a second stage reduces it to 3 cm (1.2 in).

In the current approved Life of Operation Plan, total ore reserves are scheduled to be depleted by 30 June 2035.

== Alumina Refinery ==
The refinery, also owned by South32, uses a four-stage Bayer Process to transform the red bauxite rock into white alumina powder. It is powered by coal, producing 3.7 million tonnes (8.2 billion pounds) of carbon per year averaged for 2017–2021, making it the fourth-biggest carbon polluter in Western Australia. The carbon intensity of Worsley Alumina is 820 kilograms per tonne (13.1 ounces per pound) of CO_{2} per alumina produced.
