= Thomas Harrison (minister) =

English nonconformist minister

Thomas Harrison (1 March 1619 – August 1682) was an English nonconformist minister.

== Life ==
Harrison was born at Kingston upon Hull, East Riding of Yorkshire, the son of Robert Harrison, merchant. He matriculated as a pensioner at Sidney Sussex College, Cambridge, on 12 April 1634, aged sixteen, and graduated BA in 1638.

Harrison travelled to New England by 1640, and there trained up to the ministry. He became chaplain to Sir William Berkeley, Governor of Virginia, an enemy of the puritans. The governor, with Harrison’s help, expelled from Virginia certain ministers who held extreme views, and their expulsion was followed by a disastrous rising among the Indians. This was held by many, Harrison included, to be a judgment of Providence against the persecutors of the expelled preachers.

Thus Harrison's change of views occasioned his dismissal, and he moved to New England near his brothers, where he married Dorothy Symonds. He then came to London, and, obtaining some fame as a preacher, was chosen about 1650 to succeed Dr. Thomas Goodwin in his gathered church at St Dunstan-in-the-East. Here he remained for a few years, after which he removed to Bromborough Hall, Wirrall, Cheshire. By 1655 he was widowed.

In 1657 he accompanied Henry Cromwell, when he went to Ireland as lord-lieutenant. He lived in Cromwell's family, and preached at Christ Church, Dublin. In 1659, he married Katherine Bradshaw. At The Restoration he left Ireland, and settled in Chester, preaching to large congregations in the cathedral, till he was silenced by the Act of Uniformity 1662. From a list of graduates at Cambridge from 10 October 1660 to 10 October 1661, it appears that Harrison took his D.D. there; but according to Calamy (Account, p. 607) he received it at Dublin. After the passing of the Act of Uniformity he returned to Dublin, and founded a flourishing dissenting church of congregational views. He is thought to have had a son in 1666, named Isaiah, who became a patriarch of the Harrison family of Virginia in the Shenandoah Valley.

Thomas’ eloquence and fluency both in prayer and preaching brought him great notoriety, and Calamy states that "he was a complete gentleman, much courted for his conversation". When he died there was a general mourning in Dublin. He left behind him a valuable library, containing many manuscripts, among them a System of Divinity in a large folio written by himself.

He was the minister of the non-conforming congregation at Winetavern St. and Cooke St. in Dublin, from 1670 until his death.

== Family ==
Harrison married Dorothy Symonds in 1648 (daughter of Samuel Symonds, deputy governor of Massachusetts); she died in 1655 and he later married Katherine Bradshaw.

== Works ==
Harrison published works including:

- Topica Sacra: Spiritual Logick: some brief Hints and Helps to Faith, Meditation, and Prayer, Comfort and Holiness. Communicated at Christ Church, Dublin, in Ireland, London, 1658. It was dedicated to Henry Cromwell. It became popular during the end of the seventeenth century, especially among the poorer classes in Scotland. A second part was added in 1712 by John Hunter, minister of Ayr: this was frequently reprinted. A revised and corrected edition of the first part, under the title of Spiritual Pleadings and Expostulations with God in Prayer, was published by Peter Hall in 1838.
- Old Jacob's Account Cast up, &c.; a Funeral Sermon for Lady Susannah Reynolds, preached at Lawrence Jewry, 13 February 1654
- Threni Hibernici, or Ireland sympathising with England and Scotland in a sad Lamentation for the Loss of their Josiah; a Sermon preached at Christ Church, Dublin, on the Death of Oliver Cromwell, London, 1659, and dedicated to Richard Cromwell.
- An Epistle to the Reader in Lemmata Meditationum, &c. By Philo-Jesus Philo-Carolus, Dublin, 1672.
