= South32 =

Mining and metals company headquartered in Perth, Western Australia

South32 Limited
- Type: Public
- Traded as: ASX: S32
- Industry: Metals; Mining
- Predecessor: BHP Billiton
- Founded: May 18, 2015; 11 years ago
- Headquarters: Perth, Western Australia
- Key people: Stephen Pearce (chair); Matt Daley (CEO)
- Products: Alumina; Aluminium; Copper; Manganese; Lead; Nickel; Silver; Zinc
- Revenue: US$ 5.78 billion (2025)
- Website: www.south32.net

South32 Limited is a mining and metals company headquartered in Perth, Western Australia. It was spun out of BHP Billiton on 18 May 2015. It is listed on the Australian Securities Exchange with secondary listings on the Johannesburg and London Stock Exchanges.

== Products ==
The company is a producer of bauxite, alumina, aluminium, metallurgical coal, manganese, nickel, copper, molybdenum, gold, silver, lead and zinc.

== Operations ==
South32 has operations in Australia, South Africa, Mozambique, Colombia and the United States. In addition it has investments in an integrated aluminium business in Brazil and a copper and molybdenum mine in Chile.

=== Australia ===
- Australia Manganese (60% shareholding); GEMCO mine on Groote Eylandt in the Northern Territory
- Cannington Mine silver, lead and zinc mine, 200 km southeast of Mount Isa, Queensland
- Worsley Alumina at Worsley, Western Australia (86% owned) is a bauxite mine and alumina refinery, a portion of the alumina is exported to South32's African smelters for conversion into aluminium

=== Brazil ===
- Mineração Rio do Norte bauxite mine near Porto Trombetas (33%)
- Alumar alumina refinery (36%) and the adjoining aluminium smelter (40%) near São Luís

=== Chile ===
- Sierra Gorda copper and molybdenum mine located in the Atacama Desert near Calama (45%)

=== Colombia ===
- Cerro Matoso nickel mine and smelter in northern Colombia (99.94%)

=== Mozambique ===
- Mozal aluminium smelter in Maputo (47.1%). In care and maintenance as of 16 March, 2026.

=== South Africa ===
- Hillside aluminium smelter at Richards Bay, KwaZulu-Natal
- The Wessels underground and Mamatwan opencut manganese mines at Hotazel in the Northern Cape
- Metalloys smelters at Meyerton, Gauteng (which was then sold in June 2025)

Exploratory semi-autonomous drilling at South32 Hermosa project in Patagonia, Arizona.

=== United States ===
- Hermosa, a mineral resource development option located in the Patagonia Mountains of southern Arizona
- Ambler Metals (50%), a mineral resource development option located in Alaska

== Former operations ==
- TEMCO, a manganese smelter located at George Town, Tasmania, was sold to GFG Alliance in January 2021
- South Africa Energy Coal (SAEC), operating thermal coal mining assets in South Africa, was sold to Seriti in June 2021
