= Henry Worsley =

Henry Worsley may refer to:

- Sir Henry Worsley, 2nd Baronet (1613–1666), English politician
- Henry Worsley (diplomat) (1672–1740), British ambassador to Portugal and governor of Barbados
- Sir Henry Worsley-Holmes, 8th Baronet (1756–1811), of the Worsley baronets
- Henry Worsley (British Army officer) (1783–1820), lieutenant-colonel
- Henry Worsley (East India Company officer) (1768–1841), major-general
- Henry Worsley-Taylor (1847–1924), 1st Baronet of the Worsley-Taylor baronets
- Henry Worsley (explorer) (1960–2016), British Army officer and Antarctic adventurer
