= Peter Hall (priest) =

English cleric, writer and topographer

Peter Hall (1803–1849) was an English cleric and topographer. He was a prolific writer and editor, but most of his works have been considered slight.

== Life ==
Born 31 December 1803, he was the third son of James Hall of St. George's, Bloomsbury, London. Aged 13 he was sent to Winchester College, where he was educated on the foundation. He went on to Brasenose College, Oxford, matriculating 15 January 1822. He graduated B.A. 1 December 1825 and M.A. 21 January 1830.

In 1828 Hall was ordained and became curate of St Edmund's Church, Salisbury, where he remained until 1833. In September 1834 he was instituted to the rectory of Milston-cum-Brigmerston, Wiltshire, but had to leave because of the poor health of his wife. He was for a short time curate of St. Luke's, Chelsea, and afterwards, in May 1836, became minister of Tavistock Chapel, Drury Lane. In June 1841 he undertook the charge of Long Acre episcopal chapel, in the parish of St Martin-in-the-Fields. In 1843 he became minister of St. Thomas's Chapel, Walcot, Bath. He was also for some time travelling secretary to the Reformation Society.

Hall died at Great Malvern, Worcestershire, on 10 September 1849, leaving a widow and three daughters. His library was sold 27 May–4 June 1850.

== Works ==
Hall's The Harmony of Protestant Confessions (1841), his Reliquiae liturgicae (1847), and Fragmenta liturgica (1848) are among his significant works. He wrote:

- Τεκμήρια μετρικά; Symptoms of Rhyme, original and translated (anon.), London, 1824 (twenty-five copies printed).
- Ductor Vindogladiensis; an Historical and Descriptive Guide to the Town of Wimborne-Minster, Dorsetshire, London, 1830 (fourteen copies were printed on coloured paper); 2nd edit. Wimborne, 1853.
- Picturesque Memorials of Winchester, 1830.
- A Few Topographical Remarks relative to the parishes of Ringwood, Ellingham, Ibbesley, Harbridge, and Fordingbridge, and the New Forest (anon.), Ringwood, 1831; 4th edit. enlarged, with a short description of Bournemouth, Ringwood, 1867.
- Picturesque Memorials of Salisbury, a series of original etchings and vignettes. … To which is prefixed a brief History of Old and New Sarum, Salisbury, 1834.
- Congregational Reform, according to the Liturgy of the Church of England, in four sermons, with an appendix of notes, London, 1835; 2nd edition the same year.

Hall also edited:

- The Crypt, or Receptacle for things past; an Antiquarian, Literary, and Miscellaneous Journal, 3 vols. Ringwood, 1827–8; continued as The Crypt … and West of England Magazine, new series, 1 vol., Winchester, 1829.
- De Animi Immortalitate, a Latin poem by Isaac Hawkins Browne, with a memoir, 1833.
- Sermons and other Remains of Robert Lowth, D.D., sometime Bishop of London; now first collected and arranged, partly from original MSS., with an introductory memoir, 1834. These discourses were pronounced to be spurious by the representatives of the Lowth family. Correspondence on the matter by Hall, William Sturges Bourne, and an anonymous writer "Verax" appeared in the Gentleman's Magazine for August and September 1834, and February, March, and April 1835.
- A Summary View and Explanation of the Writings of the Prophets, by John Smith, D.D., minister of the Gospel at Campbeltown, with a brief Memoir, 1835.
- Versiones Biblicæ, from the Hebrew Lectures of Bishop Lowth, Rugby, 1836.
- The Works of Joseph Hall, 12 vols. Oxford, 1837–9.
- Satires and other Poems, by Joseph Hall, D.D., afterwards Bishop of Exeter and of Norwich, 1838.
- Spiritual Pleadings and Expostulations with God in Prayer by Thomas Harrison, 1838.
- An Exposition on the two Epistles to the Thessalonians, by John Jewell, 1841.
- The Harmony of Protestant Confessions, … enlarged by … P. Hall, 1842.
- Reliquiæ Liturgicæ. Documents connected with the Liturgy of the Church of England, 5 vols., Bath, 1847.
- Fragmenta Liturgica. Documents illustrative of the Liturgy of the Church of England, 7 vols., Bath, 1848.
- Lancelot Andrewes's Preces privatæ quotidianæ, 1848, of which he had published a translation in 1830.

He edited, further, A Dialogue between a Popish Priest and an English Protestant, by Matthew Poole; Serious Thoughts on Marriage … Strictures on the Education of Children, by William Giles; Scripture Characters by the Rev. Thomas Robinson, 4 vols.

Hall published numerous sermons, including The Church and the World, a sermon preached at St Thomas's Church, Salisbury, on 21 April 1833, with an account of his dismissal from his Salisbury curacy in the preface. He wrote also pamphlets and letters.
