= Edward Leeds (barrister) =

Edward Leeds (baptised 1693 – 1758) was an English barrister, who reached the degree of serjeant-at-law in 1743.

== Life ==
He was only son of Edward Leeds (1664–1729), citizen and mercer of London, and a prominent patron of dissent in Hackney, and his wife Elizabeth Woolley. On 2 May 1710 he was admitted to the Inner Temple, where he was an organiser of a club for dissenting students; and was called to the bar on 29 June 1718. He became eminent as a case lawyer, and enjoyed a large chamber practice.

In February 1742 Leeds was summoned to "take the coif", so becoming a serjeant-at-law, and in Trinity term 1748 was made a king's serjeant. During vacations he lived mainly on his estate at Croxton, Cambridgeshire. He retired from practice in 1755, and died on 5 December 1758. William Cole described Leeds as "a heavy, dull, plodding man, but a great lover of antiquity." Dudley Ryder commented that he had "no clear method", but saw some positives also.

== Family ==
In 1715 Leeds married Anne (died 1757), third daughter of Joseph Collett of Hertford Castle, formerly governor of Fort St George. They had two sons, Edward and Joseph, and two daughters: Henrietta (1716–1766), who on 26 April 1768 became the second wife of John Howard the philanthropist, and Anne, married on 31 May 1764 to John Barnardiston, a solicitor.
