= Henry Worsley (British Army officer) =

Henry Worsley CB
- Born: February 1783
- Died: 13 May 1820 (aged 37)
- Military career
- Allegiance: United Kingdom
- Branch: British Army
- Service years: 1799–1820
- Rank: Lieutenant-colonel
- Conflicts: French Revolutionary Wars; Anglo-Russian Invasion of Holland; Battle of Bergen; Napoleonic Wars; West Indies Campaign; Walcheren Campaign; Peninsular War; Battle of Fuentes d'Onoro; Siege of Badajoz; Siege of Burgos; Battle of Vitoria; Battle of the Pyrenees; Battle of Nivelle; Battle of the Nive; Battle of Orthez; Battle of Toulouse
- Awards: Army Gold Cross
- Other work: Captain of Yarmouth Castle (1818–1820)

Lieutenant-Colonel Henry Worsley CB (February 1783 − 13 May 1820) was a British Army officer. He was the third son of James Worsley (1748−1798), rector of Gatcombe on the Isle of Wight, by his wife, Ann Hayles.

== Military career ==
In the autumn of 1799 he obtained an ensigncy in the 6th Foot, and accompanied the expedition to Holland under the Duke of York.

- In 1800, he received a lieutenancy in the 52nd Foot.
- In 1802, the 2nd Battalion of that regiment became the 96th Foot, to which Worsley was posted.
- In 1804, he obtained a company, and in 1805 went to America with Sir Eyre Coote (1762−1823).
- In 1809, he joined the 85th Regiment and took part in the expedition to the Scheldt under John Pitt, second Earl of Chatham.
- In 1811, he proceeded to the Peninsula, and was present at the Battle of Fuentes de Oñoro and the Siege of Badajoz.

Shortly afterwards he was promoted to a majority in the 4th Garrison Battalion, then at Guernsey, but, obtaining his removal to the 34th Regiment in 1812, he returned to Spain and served in the advance on Madrid and the retreat from Salamanca. After the Battle of Vitoria in 1813, he was recommended for promotion, received the rank of lieutenant-colonel, and served in the conflicts in the Pyrenees, gaining the thanks of Lord Hill. In 1816, he proceeded to India, but was forced shortly afterwards by ill-health to return to Europe.

He was awarded Companion of the Order of the Bath (CB) and in 1818 appointed Captain of Yarmouth Castle on the Isle of Wight until his death.

== Personal ==
He died, unmarried, at Newport in the Isle of Wight on 13 May 1820, and was buried at Kingston Accounts of his services, confused with those of Sir Henry Worsley, appear in Gentleman's Magazine.
