= William D. Matthews =

American abolitionist (1829–1906)

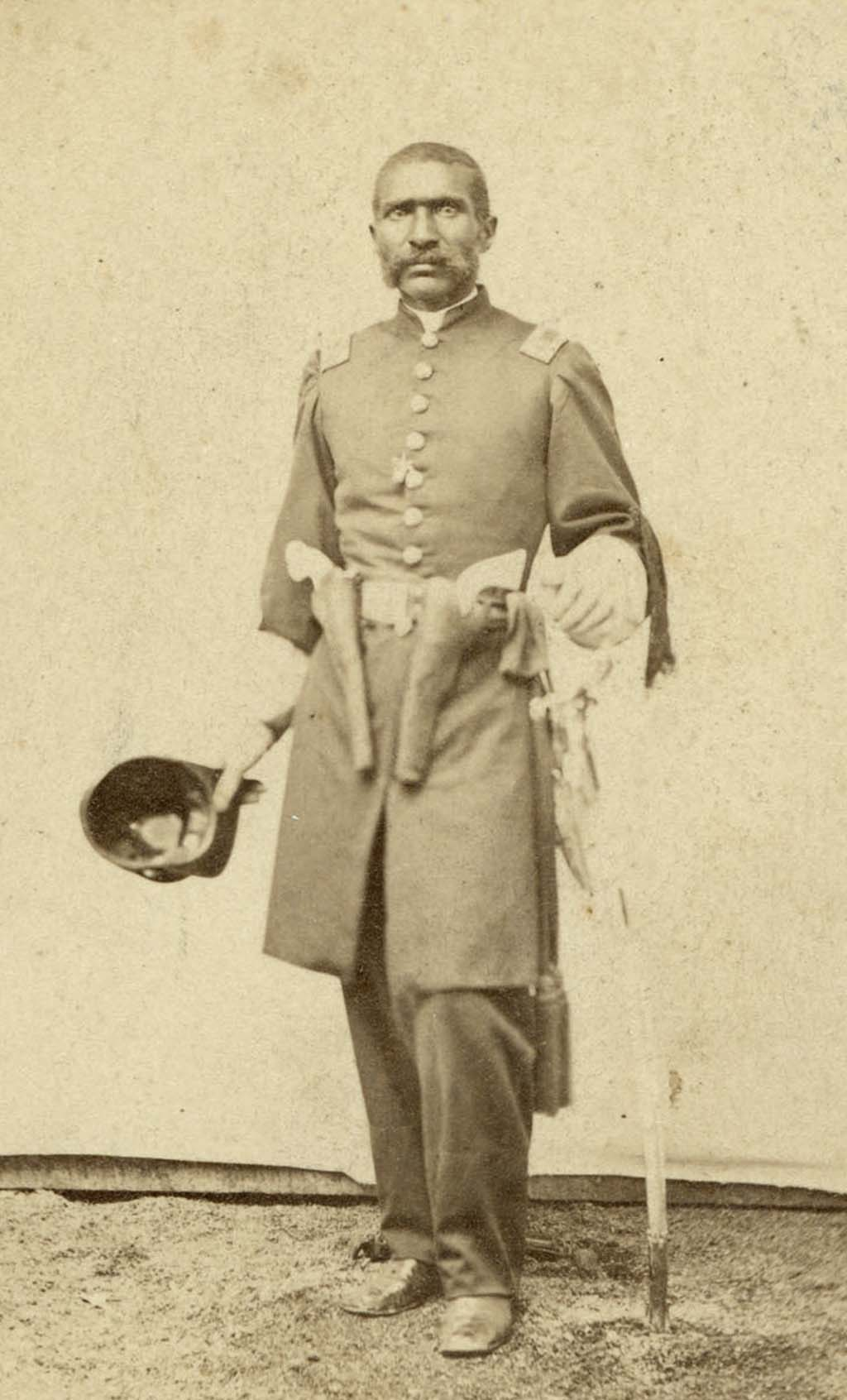
- William D. Matthews: Captain of the 1st Kansas Colored Infantry Regiment. Courtesy of the Kansas State Historical Society
- Born: October 25, 1829; Maryland, U.S.
- Died: March 2, 1906 (aged 76); Leavenworth, Kansas, U.S.
- Occupations: Sailor, Officer, Civil Rights Activist
- Political party: Republican

William Dominick Matthews (October 25, 1829 – March 2, 1906) was an African-American abolitionist, Civil War Union officer and Freemason. He was leader in Leavenworth, Kansas, as well as nationally. Matthews is considered one of the first of African-American men to achieve the rank as an Officer in the Union Army during the American Civil War.

== Life in Maryland ==
Matthews was born October 25, 1829, on the eastern shore of Maryland. William Dominick Matthews was born free to mixed-race parents. His father, Joseph, was from Delaware and of African descent. His mother, the half-white slave daughter of a Frenchman, had gained her release from bondage upon her father's death. Matthews moved to Baltimore in the late 1840s and worked as a sailor until 1854, when he purchased his own vessel and worked the Chesapeake Bay and Potomac River. Discriminatory laws limited his ability to make a living. He sold the boat and left Maryland.

== Abolitionist in Leavenworth, Kansas ==
Matthews moved to Leavenworth, Kansas, in 1856. It was there that he opened the Waverly House, near what was then Shawnee and Main streets, which served as a stage on the Underground Railroad. With the help of others including Daniel Read Anthony (brother of Susan B. Anthony), he helped many escape the yoke of slavery.

== Civil War ==
Matthews served as superintendent of contrabands for the Kansas Emancipation League starting in 1862. The League was an outgrowth of a school established for fugitive blacks in 1861. When word came that a force of blacks was to be raised, Matthews along with New England abolitionist Ethan Earle wished to join the recruiting and be allowed to lead troops. He was initially told that he would not be allowed to lead and was offered a commission in the commissary or quartermaster department, but he protested. In August 1862, Senator James Henry Lane acquiesced and authorized Matthews to raise a company for the First Kansas Colored Volunteers and be its commander—and Matthews raised what would eventually be Company D. The regiment was originally mustered into the Kansas militia, and before being mustered into service in the Union Army they engaged in the skirmish at Island Mound. This skirmish was the first time a regiment of black troops saw combat in the Civil War and occurred five months before the famous 54th Infantry conflict at the Battle of Fort Wagner, in South Carolina.

Matthews and his two lieutenants, Henry Copeland and Patrick Minor, were the highest-ranked black officers in the regiment but were denied commissions when the regiment became a part of the Federal Army. Each eventually was given commissions to serve in the Independent Kansas Colored Battery, where Matthews became commander of the Independent Kansas Colored Battery. When the 1st Kansas Colored was mustered into the Union Army after the Emancipation Proclamation, Matthews and Minor were denied the chance to keep their rankings. With the support of the regiment, including all of its white officers, the pair protested. On January 28, 1863, the War Department authorized the muster of Matthews as officer, which would make Matthews the first regularly commissioned black officer, but the order was not carried out, and Matthews was not commissioned when the company mustered. With no official role in the regiment, Matthews was reported to have encouraged others to desert, and Andrew J. Armstrong replaced Matthews as captain of the company. In 1890, Williams testified that Matthews served in the organization and early drill of the company until May 1863. At an 1890 reunion of the First Kansas Infantry, Matthews was elected chairman of the gathering.

In July 1864, Matthews and Minor were appointed recruiting officers for the Independent Kansas Colored Battery out of Leavenworth, also called Douglas's Battery. In September he moved to Fort Scott to continue recruiting, mostly escaped Missouri slaves. Matthews and the battery were in Fort Scott during Price's Raid, and local commander Colonel Charles W. Blair put Matthews in charge of enrolling "all able bodied colored men in Bourbon County" and assembling them at the fort to defend them from Price. Price diverted towards the east, however. Matthews, Minor, and Captain H. Ford Douglas were the only black artillery officers in the Union army.

== After the war ==
In 1870, he was summoned by U. S. Marshal D. W. Houston to the Grand Jury in the U. S. District Court. He was also the Chairman of the State (Colored) Central Committee. That fall he was nominated by the Republican Party to the State Senate from Leavenworth but was defeated. He was a prominent participant in the Colored Conventions Movement and in 1874 again was candidate for the state legislature, losing to H. D. Mackay in a controversial vote; his loss in both elections was ascribed in part to his failure to gain the support of white Republicans.

== Freemasonry ==
William D. Matthews joined the Masonic fraternity at the age of 22. He was a popular as well as controversial leader in Prince Hall Freemasonry. Matthews was a force with the organization of Freemasonry among African Americans in the central to western parts of the United States. He helped to organize the Most Worshipful King Solomon Grand Lodge, under the jurisdiction of the Most Worshipful National Grand Lodge of Free and Accepted Ancient York Masons on June 24, 1867. This Grand Lodge became powerful with jurisdiction over lodges in Kansas, Nebraska, Arkansas, Texas, Colorado, and Wyoming. The lodges Matthews organized in Texas formed the Grand Lodge of Texas (now styled The Most Worshipful Prince Hall Grand Lodge of Texas), with Matthews installing the officers at its formation. Matthews was elevated to the eighth National Grand Master in 1887 and served until his death in 1906.

== Family and death ==
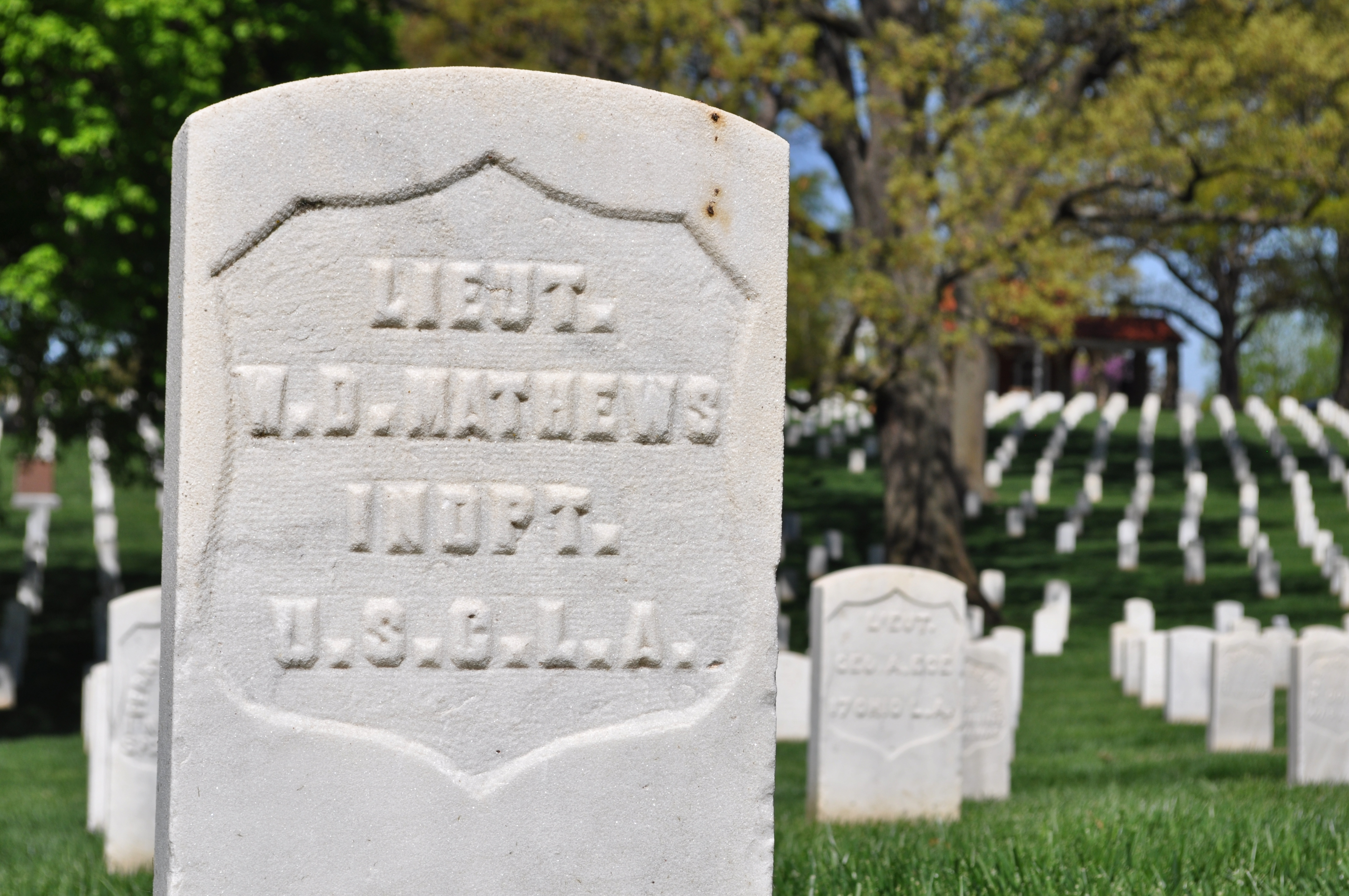
Matthews' grave marker at Leavenworth National Cemetery in Leavenworth, Kansas

Matthews had two sons, John D. and Joseph Edward, each of whom died in the late 1890s. Matthews died March 2, 1906, at his home in Leavenworth. His funeral was at the Kiowa Street African Methodist Episcopal Church, he was buried in Mount Muncie Cemetery, but his body was moved to the Soldier's Home Cemetery in 1908.
