= Edward Pomeroy Barrett-Lennard =

Australian politician

Edward Pomeroy Barrett-Lennard (19 June 1799 in England – 29 June 1878 in Upper Swan, Western Australia) was an early settler in the Guildford area of Western Australia. He was the fifth son of Sir Thomas Barrett-Lennard, 1st Baronet, and Dorothy St. Aubyn. His paternal grandfather was the 17th Baron Dacre.

Barrett-Lennard arrived at the Swan River Colony on board the Marquis of Anglesea on 23 August 1829 bringing with him six servants, farm animals, and equipment. He was allotted a relatively large grant of 1,176 hectares (2,906 acres) and quickly established a property in the virgin bushland in the West Swan Area near Guildford which he named St Leonard's.

In December 1829, the Lieutenant-Governor, James Stirling appointed him, along with five other prominent settlers, a Justice of the Peace.

He returned to England in 1836 where he married Elizabeth Frances Graham on 28 September 1837. They returned to Western Australia on the Montreal on 2 May 1839 with their first child and Barrett-Lennard's nephew, Edmund Thomas Barrett-Lennard, whose descendants lived at Beverley, Western Australia.

On 4 May 1840, Barrett-Lennard replaced William Locke Brockman as one of the four nominee positions on the Western Australian Legislative Council. He only held the position until the following year before resigning, possibly due to a fire which destroyed the St. Leonards homestead in 1841.

He and his wife had seven children, two of them dying young, and in 1854, she returned to England with the four youngest children to ensure their education and never returned. Of the remaining children, only one, Edward Graham Barrett-Lennard, remained in Western Australia and survived to marry and have children locally.

At his peak, Barrett-Lennard's holdings comprised 16,000 acres (65 km^{2}) of freehold land with a horse stud and cattle holdings. He also imported merino sheep. However, much of his assets were on borrowed money and by 1866 he was bankrupt. After selling his properties to his son's wife's family, he lived out his final years alone on the St. Leonards property in relatively poor circumstances.

He is buried at All Saints Church in Upper Swan.
