= Lady Worsley =

Lady Worsley may refer to:

- Ursula St. Barbe (d. 1602)
- Seymour Dorothy Fleming (1758-1818) whose life was dramatised in the 2015 television film, The Scandalous Lady W
- Alexandra Pelham, Lady Worsley (1890-1963)
- Caroline, Lady Worsley (b. 1934)
