= John Worsley (scholar) =

English schoolmaster and scholar of classical Greek

John Worsley (30 March 1696, Hertford – 16 December 1767, Hertford, Hertfordshire, England) was an English schoolmaster and scholar of classical Greek. He made a translation of the New Testament, which was published in 1770.

== Life and works ==
He was for fifty years a successful schoolmaster at Hertford, with a school run in Hertford Castle.

Worsley made a translation of the New Testament, into contemporary English, supposed to be the first such translation since the King James Bible. It omitted the traditional division into verses. After his death it was published by subscription in 1770, as The New Testament or New Covenant, edited by Matthew Bradshaw and one of the author's sons, Samuel Worsley (22 September 1740 – 7 March 1800). The system of substitutions for words, such as "mote", no longer current in spoken English, by "chaff" or "splinter", met with approval from the Monthly Review.

Other works by Worsley were grammatical tables (1736), and Exemplaria Latino-Anglica (1745). A Short, Plain and Comprehensive Grammar for the Latin Tongue was published in 1771.

== Family ==
In c. 1727, John married Grace Hughes (2 November 1696 – 23 October 1786), great-granddaughter of George Hughes (clergyman). Another son, also called John Worsley (died 1807), was his successor as schoolmaster, and was the father of Israel Worsley.
