= National Register of Historic Places listings in Monroe County, Mississippi =

Location of Monroe County in Mississippi

The following properties are listed on the National Register of Historic Places in Monroe County, Mississippi.

This is intended to be a complete list of the properties and districts on the National Register of Historic Places in Monroe County, Mississippi, United States. Latitude and longitude coordinates are provided for many National Register properties and districts; these locations may be seen together in a map.

There are 37 properties and districts listed on the National Register in the county, including 1 National Historic Landmark.

This National Park Service list is complete through NPS recent listings posted August 28, 2026.

== Current listings ==
	Name on the Register	Image	Date listed	Location	City or town	Description
1	Aberdeen City Hall	Aberdeen City Hall	February 22, 1988 (#88000126)	125 W. Commerce St. 33°49′30″N 88°32′41″W	Aberdeen	
2	Aberdeen Downtown Historic District	Aberdeen Downtown Historic District	July 11, 1997 (#97000634)	Roughly bounded by James, Quincy, Maple, and Washington Sts. 33°49′34″N 88°32′47″W	Aberdeen	
3	Adams-French House	Adams-French House	February 22, 1988 (#88000125)	N. Meridian and Marshall Sts. 33°49′42″N 88°32′39″W	Aberdeen	
4	Baker Mound		July 17, 1980 (#80002291)	Address restricted	Aberdeen	
5	Baptist Ville Historic District		October 16, 2023 (#100009439)	Roughly bounded by Ben Bender Rd., Short., North Columbus, and West Vine Sts., and Woodcrest Dr. 33°49′54″N 88°33′03″W	Aberdeen	
6	133 East Commerce Street	133 East Commerce Street	February 22, 1988 (#88000136)	133 E. Commerce St. 33°49′28″N 88°32′32″W	Aberdeen	
7	Buildings at 110–122 East Commerce Street	Buildings at 110–122 East Commerce Street	February 22, 1988 (#88000138)	110–122 E. Commerce St. 33°49′31″N 88°32′34″W	Aberdeen	
8	100 West Commerce	100 West Commerce	February 22, 1988 (#88000135)	100–104 W. Commerce St. and 107 N. Meridian St. 33°49′31″N 88°32′38″W	Aberdeen	
9	Capt. Thomas Coopwood House	Capt. Thomas Coopwood House	September 9, 2004 (#88000492)	205 Thayer Ave. 33°49′25″N 88°33′42″W	Aberdeen	
10	Cotton Gin Port Site	Cotton Gin Port Site	October 18, 1972 (#72000700)	Along the Tombigbee River west of Amory; 33°58′15″N 88°32′35″W	Amory	
11	Crawford Site		November 28, 1980 (#80002292)	Address restricted	Aberdeen	
12	Reuben Davis House	Reuben Davis House	November 16, 1978 (#78001622)	803 W. Commerce St. 33°49′30″N 88°33′22″W	Aberdeen	
13	C.C. Day House	C.C. Day House	February 22, 1988 (#88000123)	517 S. Meridian St. 33°49′10″N 88°32′40″W	Aberdeen	
14	William A. Dunklin House	William A. Dunklin House	February 22, 1988 (#88000122)	301 High St. 33°49′08″N 88°32′46″W	Aberdeen	
15	Harmon Subdivision Historic District		April 22, 1988 (#88000121)	933–939 and 943 W. Commerce St. 33°49′30″N 88°33′36″W	Aberdeen	
16	Hester-Standifer Creek Site		June 5, 1975 (#75001051)	Address restricted	Amory	
17	John Holliday House	John Holliday House	February 22, 1988 (#88000120)	609 S. Meridian St. 33°49′07″N 88°32′39″W	Aberdeen	
18	Inzer Site		July 5, 1973 (#73001022)	Address restricted	Amory	
19	Johnson-Butler House	Johnson-Butler House	February 22, 1988 (#88000119)	210 High St. 33°49′09″N 88°32′44″W	Aberdeen	
20	Lawson Site		July 7, 1975 (#75001052)	Address restricted	Amory	
21	Lenoir Plantation House	Lenoir Plantation House	April 28, 1992 (#91001893)	Off Alternate U.S. Route 45, 3 miles south of its junction with Mississippi Highway 382; 33°45′12″N 88°41′19″W	Prairie	
22	Mobile and Ohio Railroad Depot	Mobile and Ohio Railroad Depot	December 8, 1983 (#83003966)	612 W. Commerce St. 33°49′34″N 88°33′05″W	Aberdeen	
23	Monroe County Courthouse	Monroe County Courthouse	December 22, 1978 (#78001623)	Courthouse Sq. 33°49′18″N 88°32′28″W	Aberdeen	
24	Monroe County Jail	Monroe County Jail	July 14, 1978 (#78001624)	50001 Beeks; 33°52′17″N 88°26′33″W	Athens	Also known as Athens Jail
25	Mound Cemetery Site		October 14, 1975 (#75001053)	Address restricted	Amory	
26	North Aberdeen Historic District		April 22, 1988 (#88000131)	Roughly bounded by Meridian, Marshall, Long, and Commerce Sts. 33°49′36″N 88°32′48″W	Aberdeen	
27	Old Homestead	Old Homestead	February 22, 1988 (#88000124)	503 W. Commerce; 33°49′29″N 88°32′56″W	Aberdeen	
28	Francis M. Rogers House	Francis M. Rogers House	November 3, 1988 (#88002222)	205 High St. 33°49′07″N 88°32′44″W	Aberdeen	
29	Sadler House	Sadler House	March 21, 2011 (#11000113)	400 Marshall St. 33°49′42″N 88°32′51″W	Aberdeen	
30	The Saunders-Paine House		September 28, 2017 (#100001678)	309 S. Matubba St. 33°49′22″N 88°33′09″W	Aberdeen	
31	South Central Aberdeen Historic District		April 22, 1988 (#88000134)	Roughly bounded by Locust, Washington, Franklin, and High Sts.; also roughly bounded by Madison, Meridian, High, and Long Sts.; also roughly bounded by Commerce, Burnett, rear property lines of Franklin & W. side of S. Matubba Sts. 33°49′18″N 88°32′49″W	Aberdeen	Second and third set of boundaries represents a boundary increase of September 10, 2004 and September 28, 2017
32	James Young Thompson House	James Young Thompson House	August 16, 1990 (#90001223)	Old Cotton Gin Rd., ¼ mile north of U.S. Route 278; 33°59′07″N 88°31′40″W	Amory	
33	U.S. Courthouse and Post Office	U.S. Courthouse and Post Office	September 29, 1976 (#76001104)	201 W. Commerce St. 33°49′29″N 88°32′41″W	Aberdeen	
34	US Post Office-Amory	US Post Office-Amory	April 11, 1988 (#88000691)	215 1st Ave. 33°59′09″N 88°29′18″W	Amory	
35	W.W. Watkins House	W.W. Watkins House	April 5, 1991 (#91000387)	600 W. Commerce St. 33°49′32″N 88°33′03″W	Aberdeen	
36	West Commerce Street Historic District	West Commerce Street Historic District	April 19, 1988 (#88000128)	721–919 and 730–900 W. Commerce St. 33°49′31″N 88°33′20″W	Aberdeen	
37	Word Mound		July 17, 1980 (#80002293)	Address restricted	Aberdeen	

== See also ==
- List of National Historic Landmarks in Mississippi
- National Register of Historic Places listings in Mississippi
