= Commerce Street Historic District =

Commerce Street Historic District or West Commerce Street Historic District or variations may refer to:

- Commerce Street Residential Historic District, Greenville, AL, listed on the NRHP in Alabama
- East Commerce Street Historic District, Greenville, AL, listed on the NRHP in Alabama
- Lower Commerce Street Historic District, Montgomery, AL, listed on the NRHP in Alabama
- West Commerce Street Historic District (Greenville, Alabama), listed on the NRHP in Alabama
- Hernando Commerce Street Historic District, Hernando, MS, listed on the NRHP in Mississippi
- Commerce Street Historic District (West Point, Mississippi), listed on the NRHP in Mississippi
- West Commerce Street Historic District (Aberdeen, Mississippi), listed on the NRHP in Mississippi
- Commerce Street Industrial Historic District, Petersburg, VA, listed on the NRHP in Virginia
