= Hester Site =

- U.S. National Register of Historic Places
- U.S. National Historic Landmark
- Nearest city: Amory, Mississippi
- NRHP reference No.: 75001051

Significant dates
- Added to NRHP: June 5, 1975
- Designated NHL: January 3, 2001

Hester Site (known by the two Smithsonian trinomials 22MO569 and 22MO1011) is a major prehistoric archaeological site in Monroe County, Mississippi. It is a multicomponent site whose major occupation took place during the Archaic period with artifacts dating from 9000 to 8000 BCE, and other occupations during the Woodland and Mississippian periods. The site is one of the largest Archaic sites in the southeastern United States, and its well-stratified nature was critical in providing for accurate relative dating of finds at other sites throughout the region. The site was declared a National Historic Landmark in 2001.

== Description ==
The Hester Site is located in northeastern Mississippi, near the city of Amory in Monroe County. The full extent of the site is unknown, because it has only been subjected to limited excavation, in 1974-75 and again in 1978. The site has three clearly delineated soil types, each of which contains a complex of features and finds. The uppermost layer contains Woodland and Mississippian period artifacts, although there are older artifacts intermingled because the layer falls within the plow zone, and there has been agricultural activity at the site. The second major layer contains Middle and Late Archaic artifacts. The deepest layers of the site contain Paleo-Indian and Early Archaic artifacts, a period of occupation dating from 9000 BCE to 7000 BCE. All of the layers contain evidence of the manufacture of stone tools using locally abundant chert.

The bottom are of most significant importance to archaeologists. It is further stratified, permitting a mapping of different styles and tool-making methods to the strata layers. This has enabled archaeologists to assign meaningful ordering to finds at other sites in the region where differing styles are typically intermingled. The Late Paleo-Indian portion of the site is also generally of particular significance, as it is the only site of this age known in the state.

== See also ==
- List of National Historic Landmarks in Mississippi
- National Register of Historic Places in Monroe County, Mississippi
