= Lower Commerce Street Historic District =

Historic district in Alabama, United States

- U.S. National Register of Historic Places
- U.S. Historic district
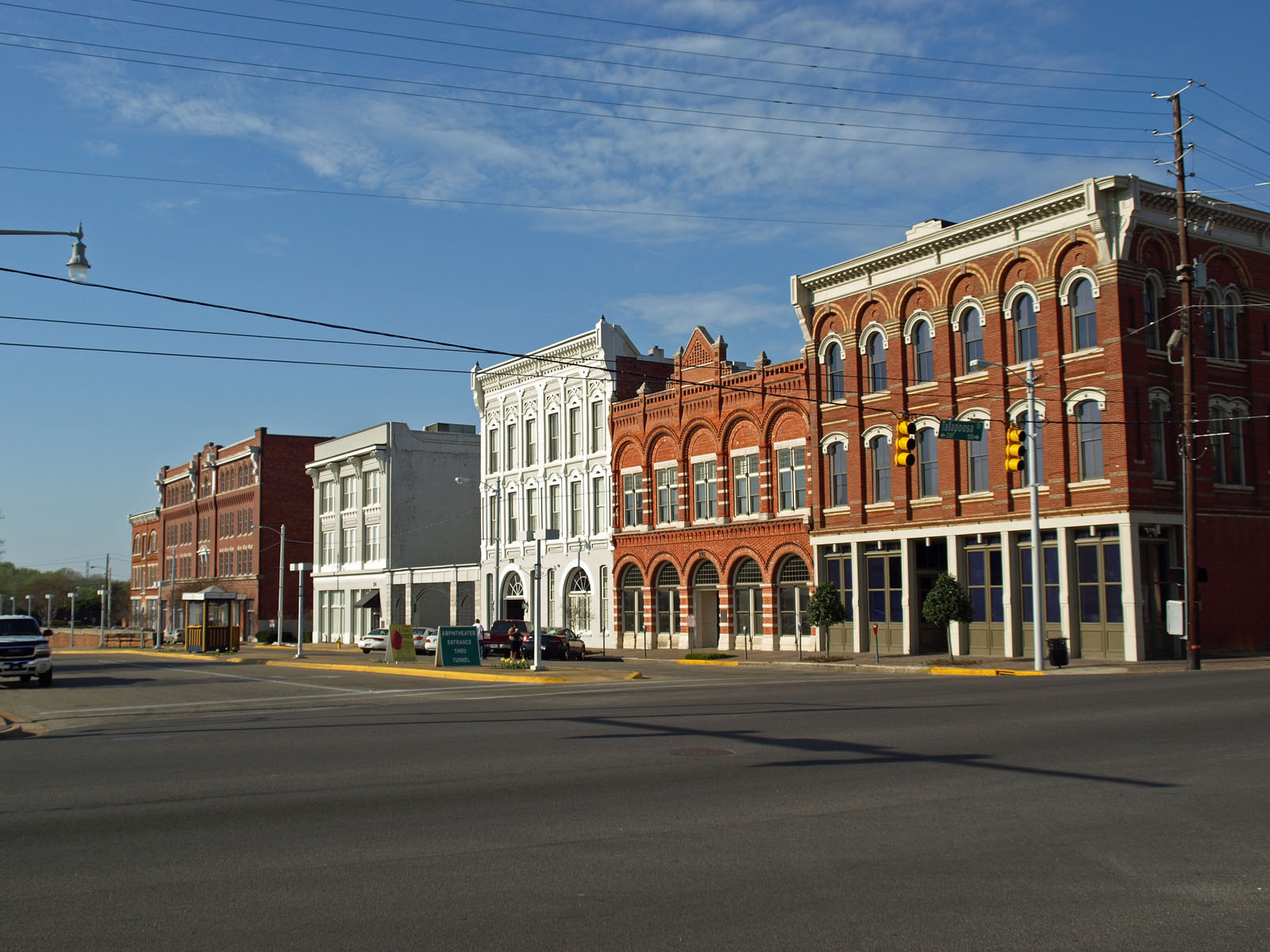
- 200 block of North Commerce Street in 2009

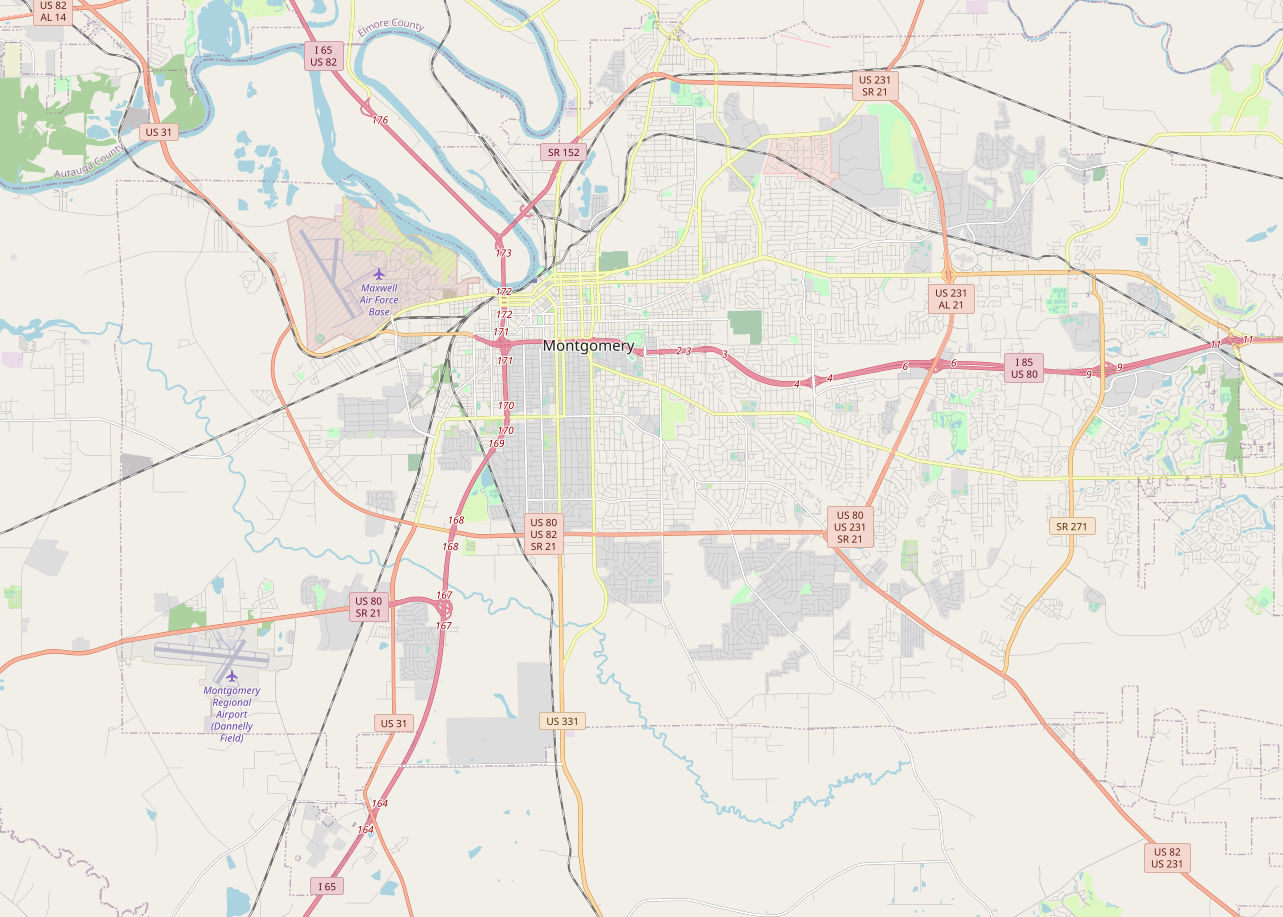
- Location within Montgomery, Alabama Location within Alabama Location within the United States
- Location: Roughly bounded by Central of Georgia RR tracks, N. Lawrence St., Madison Ave., and Commerce St., Montgomery, Alabama
- Coordinates: 32°22′49″N 86°18′38″W
- Area: 18 acres (7.3 ha) (original), 23 acres (9.3 ha) (increase), 4 acres (1.6 ha) (increase)
- Architectural style: Italianate, Classical Revival, Renaissance
- NRHP reference No.: 79000395 (original); 8200206 (increase 1); 86001529 (increase 2)

Significant dates
- Added to NRHP: March 29, 1979
- Boundary increases: February 25, 1982; January 15, 1987

The Lower Commerce Street Historic District is a 45-acre (18 ha) historic district in the old commercial district of Montgomery, Alabama. It includes fifty-two contributing buildings. It is roughly bounded by the Central of Georgia railroad tracks, North Lawrence Street, Madison Avenue, and Commerce Street. Architectural styles in the district include the Italianate, Classical Revival, and Renaissance Revival. It was placed on the National Register of Historic Places on March 29, 1979, the boundaries were subsequently increased on February 25, 1982, and January 15, 1987.

== Gallery ==
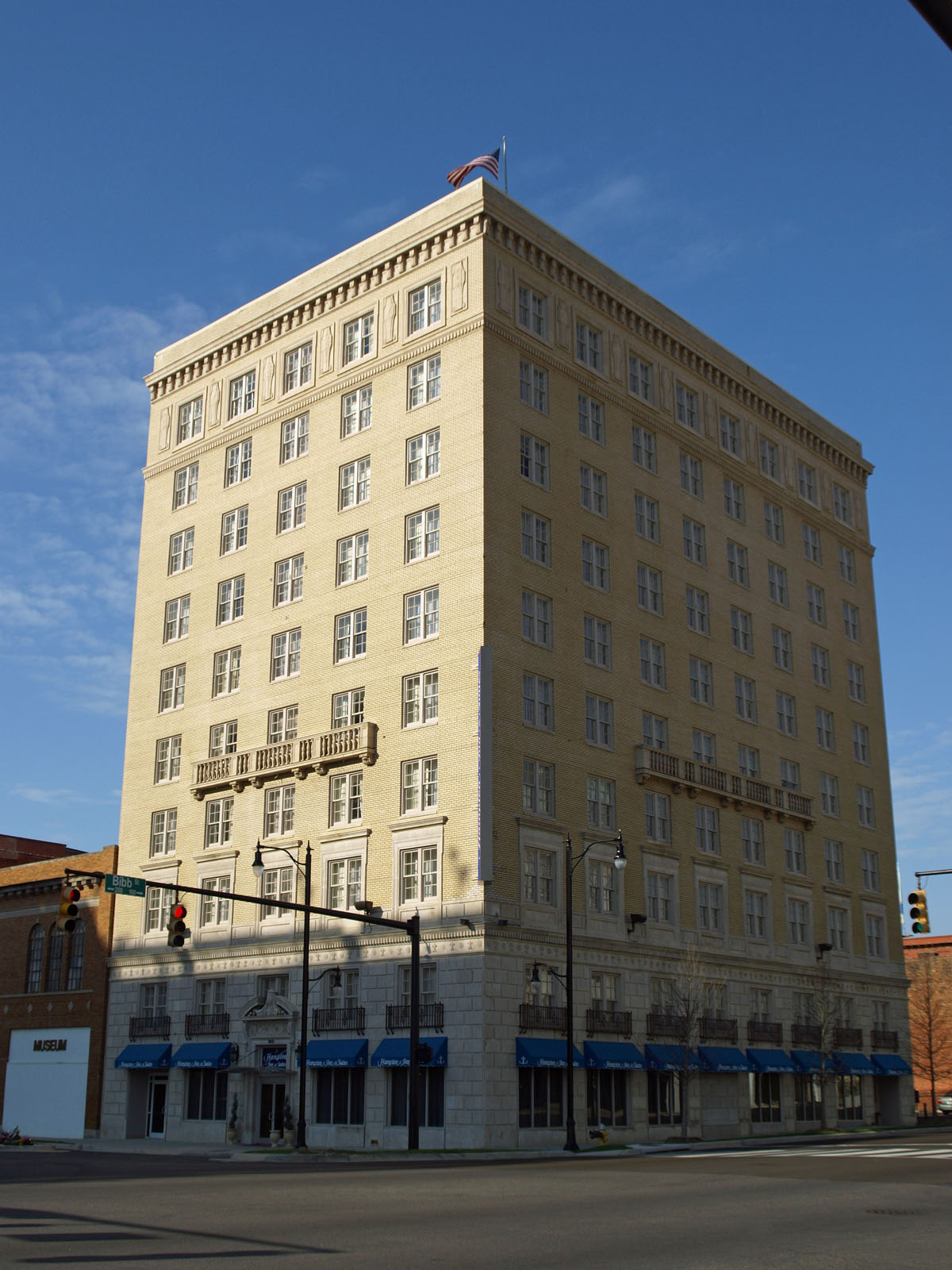
The former Greystone Hotel (now Hampton Inn) at 100 North Commerce Street

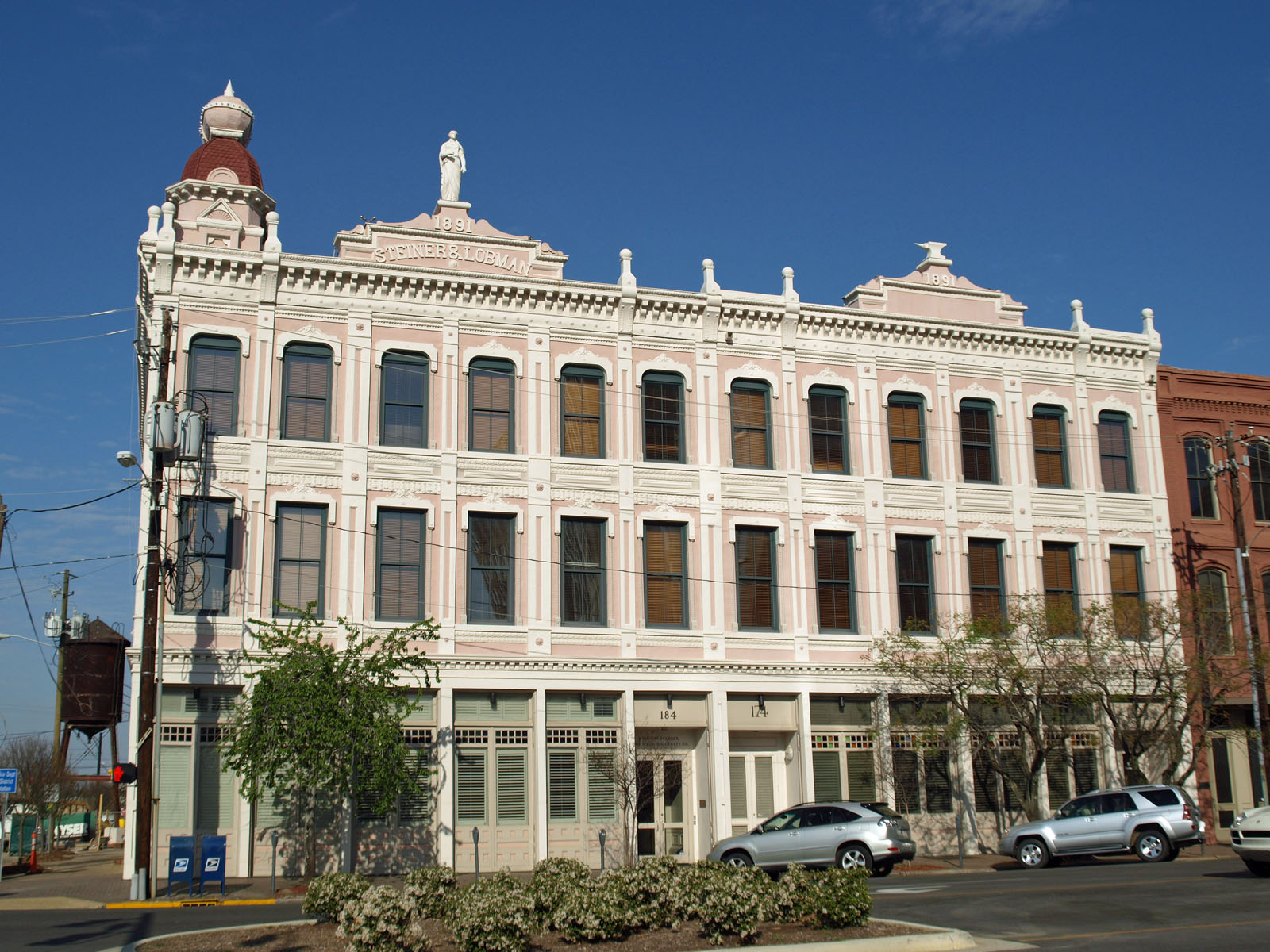
The Steiner-Lobman and Teague Hardware Buildings at 172 and 184 Commerce Street
