= Commerce Street Industrial Historic District =

Historic district in Virginia, United States

- U.S. National Register of Historic Places
- U.S. Historic district
- Virginia Landmarks Register
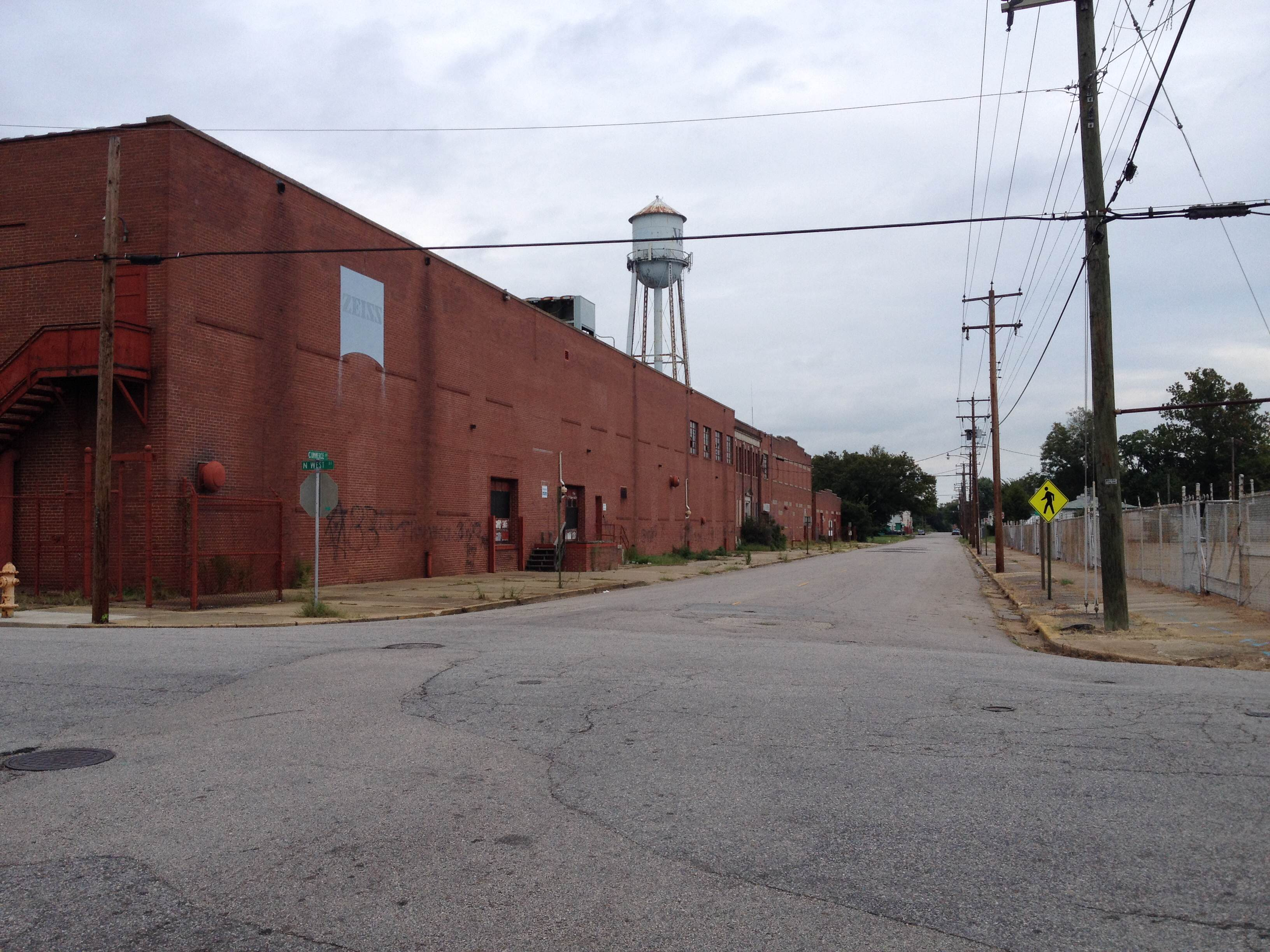

- Location within Virginia Location within the United States
- Location: Commerce, Upper Appomattox, West, Dunlop, and South Sts., Petersburg, Virginia
- Coordinates: 37°13′29″N 77°25′18″W
- Area: 9.6 acres (3.9 ha)
- Built: 1915
- Architectural style: Colonial Revival
- NRHP reference No.: 08000870
- VLR No.: 123-5420

Significant dates
- Added to NRHP: September 12, 2008
- Designated VLR: June 19, 2008

Commerce Street Industrial Historic District is a national historic district located at Petersburg, Virginia. The district includes 12 contributing buildings and 1 contributing structure located in a predominantly industrial section of Petersburg. It is dominated by four early-20th century industrial complexes – Petersburg Trunk and Bag Company (c. 1915), Titmus Optical Company (c. 1919), Rogers and Madison Trunk Corporation (c. 1921), and Southern Chemical Company (c. 1925).

It was listed on the National Register of Historic Places in 2008.
