= John Holliday House =

Historic house in Mississippi, United States

- U.S. National Register of Historic Places
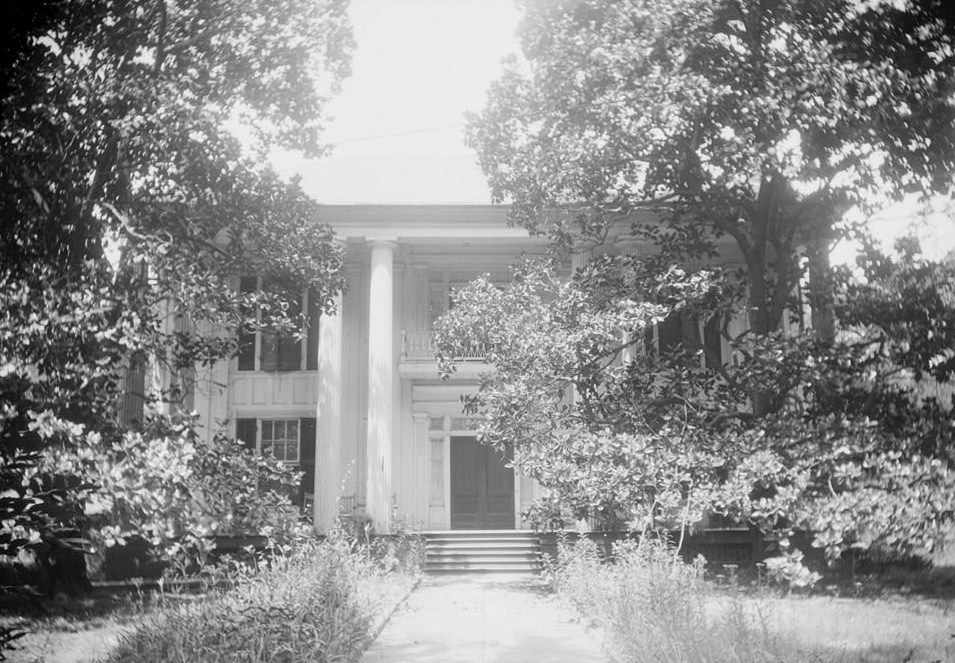
- John Holliday House, 1936

- Location within Mississippi Location within the United States
- Location: 609 South Meridian Street, Aberdeen, Mississippi
- Coordinates: 33°49′7″N 88°32′39″W
- Area: 2.1 acres (0.85 ha)
- Built: 1850
- Architectural style: Greek Revival
- MPS: Aberdeen MRA
- NRHP reference No.: 88000120
- Added to NRHP: February 22, 1988

The John Holliday House, also known as Holliday Haven. is a historic mansion in Aberdeen, Mississippi, U.S.. It was built in the 1850s for John Holliday, a North Carolinian who owned a plantation west of Aberdeen called Holliday Place. It was designed in the Greek Revival architectural style. It has been listed on the National Register of Historic Places since February 22, 1988.

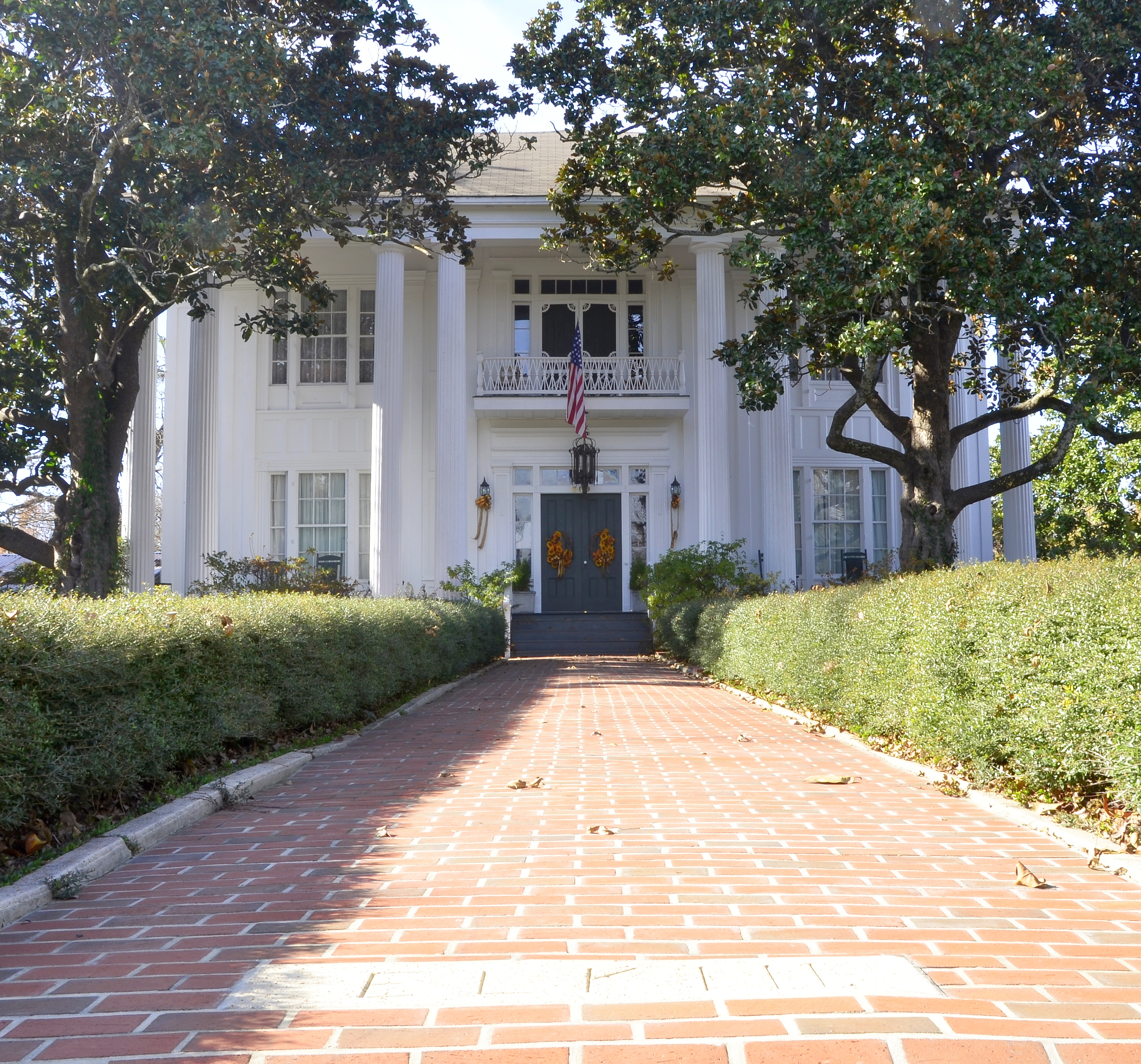
John Holliday House, 2014
