= East Commerce Street Historic District =

Historic district in Alabama, United States

- U.S. National Register of Historic Places
- U.S. Historic district
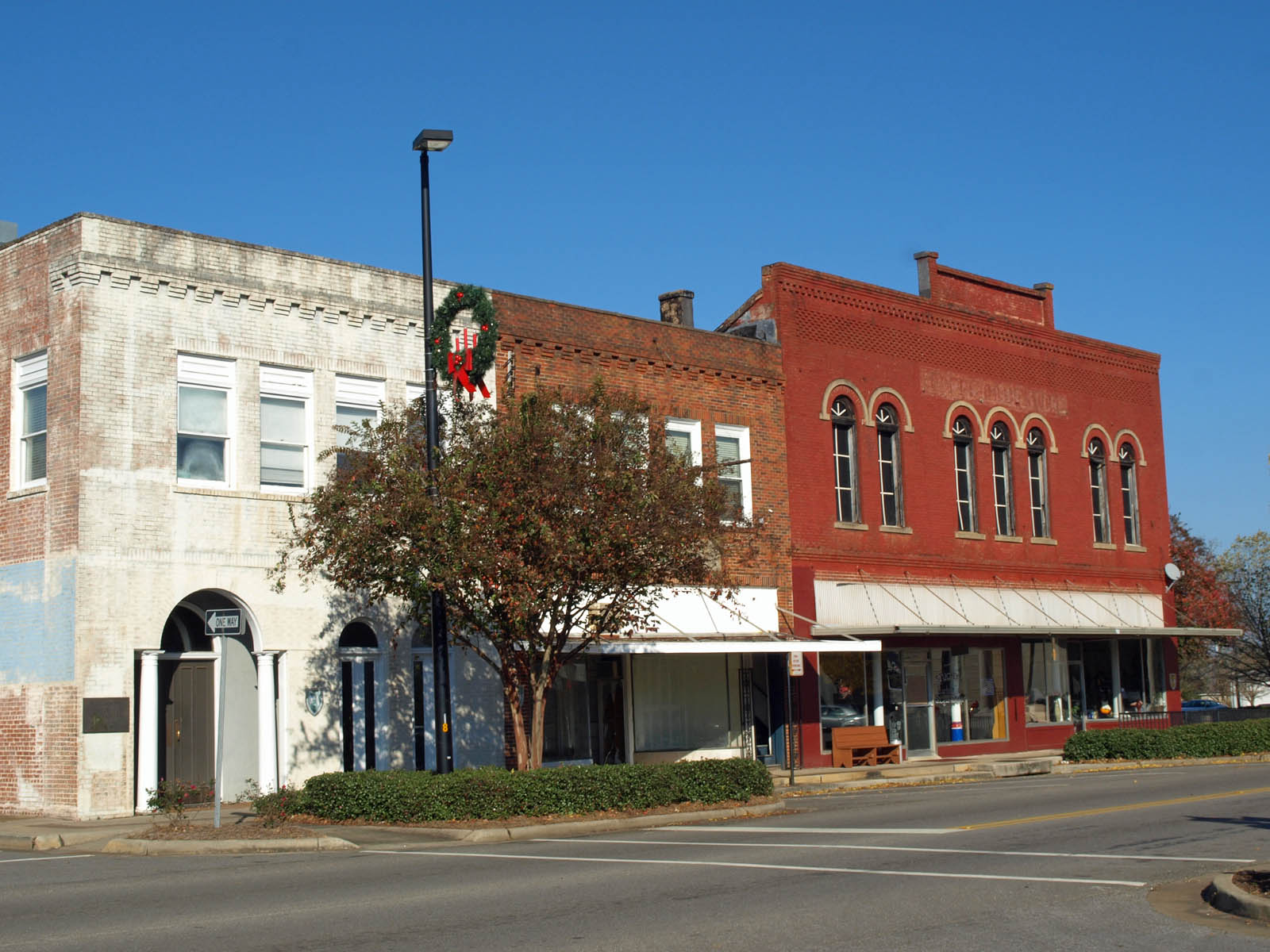
- Buildings on Commerce Street in November 2013

- Location within Alabama Location within the United States
- Location: Roughly bounded by Cedar, Chestnut, Commerce, and Hickory Sts., Greenville, Alabama
- Coordinates: 31°49′47″N 86°37′08″W
- Area: 4.5 acres (1.8 ha)
- Architectural style: Early Commercial, Romanesque
- MPS: Greenville MRA
- NRHP reference No.: 86001966
- Added to NRHP: November 4, 1986

The East Commerce Street Historic District is a historic district in Greenville, Alabama, United States. The district contains Greenville's oldest commercial buildings, as well as the Butler County Courthouse. The first courthouse on the site was built in 1822; the current, fourth, courthouse was completed in 1903. The commercial buildings date from the 1880s through 1928 and are primarily vernacular brick structures. A fire in 1927 destroyed many buildings along Commerce Street. A National Guard Armory was built south of the courthouse, on Conecuh Street, by the Works Progress Administration in 1936.

The district was listed on the National Register of Historic Places in 1986.
