= West Commerce Street Historic District (Aberdeen, Mississippi) =

Historic district in Mississippi, United States

- U.S. National Register of Historic Places
- U.S. Historic district
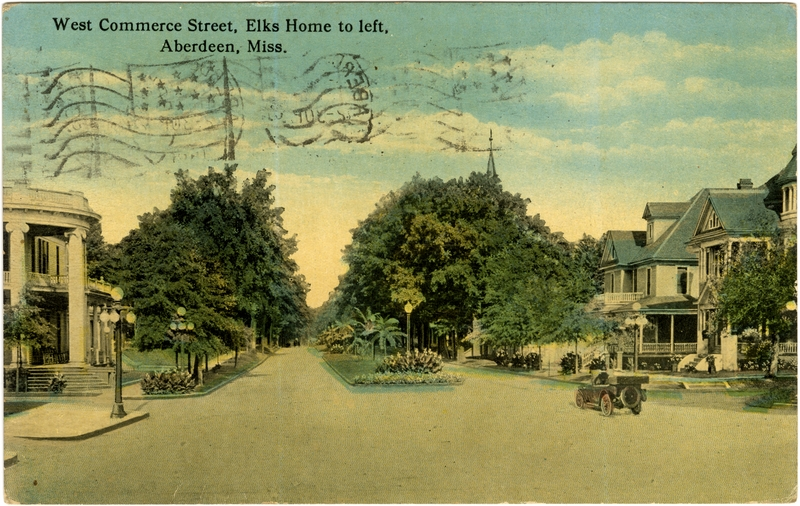
- Postcard of West Commerce Street in the early 1900s

- Location within Mississippi Location within the United States
- Location: 721-919 and 730-900 W. Commerce St., Aberdeen, Mississippi
- Coordinates: 33°49′31″N 88°33′20″W
- Area: 50 acres (20 ha)
- Built: 1840 to c. 1945
- Architectural style: multiple styles
- MPS: Aberdeen MRA
- NRHP reference No.: 88000128
- Added to NRHP: April 19, 1988

West Commerce Street Historic District in Aberdeen, Mississippi is a historic district that was listed on the National Register of Historic Places in 1988.

It includes properties with street numbers from 721 to 919 on the odd-numbered side of W. Commerce St., and from 730 to 900 on the even-numbered side. It is all residential.

It consists of 14 contributing houses, built between 1840 and c. 1938, and one contributing structure (a garage) and their outbuildings, with two non-contributing structures interspersed. Among these is the Reuben Davis House, which is separately listed on the National Register.

The houses and corresponding structures are:

- 721 W. Commerce (1840), the Mark Prewett House (Panola), Greek Revival
- 727 W. Commerce (c. 1935), Charlie Clark House, Georgian Revival, and its contributing two-story Georgian Revival garage (c. 1935)
- 729 W. Commerce (c. 1915), a 2 1/2-story house with porte cochere, with Colonial Revival influence.
- 730 W. Commerce (1840), Col. Abner Prewett House (Prewett Place). 2 1/2-story, Greek Revival.
- 732 W. Commerce (1850) Dr. William Alfred Sykes House (The Magnolias). A two-story, Greek Revival. Pivotal. Also contributing are its one-story kitchen and its one-story well house, and a non-contributing other outbuilding.
- 803 W. Commerce (1847/1853) Reuben Davis House (Sunset Hill). This two-story central-hall plan house fronted by a portico with "eight massive fluted Doric columns." Greek Revival. Pivotal.
- 807 W. Commerce (c. 1925) Bungalow.
- 800 W. Commerce (c. 1935) Bungalow influence, non-contributing.
- 806 W. Commerce (c. 1845) John Goodwin House. One-story, brick Greek Revival.
- 810 W. Commerce (c. 1900) Free classic Queen Anne.
- 900 W. Commerce (1905) H. B. Sanders House. A two-story bungalow.
- 901 W. Commerce (c. 1955) 1 1/2-story, brick ranch style house, non-contributing.
- 905 W. Commerce (1938) 1 1/2-story, five-bay-wide, brick house.
- 915 W. Commerce (1887) The Andrew J. Brown House (The Oaks). 1 1/2-story frame house. Free classic Queen Anne. And its (c. 1905) garage, and its (c. 1905) gazebo.
- 919 W. Commerce (c. 1885/1937) The Castle. 1 1/2-story house with a polygonal tower. Gothic Revival.
