= Steiner–Lobman and Teague Hardware Buildings =

- Steiner-Lobman and Teague Hardware Buildings
- U.S. National Register of Historic Places
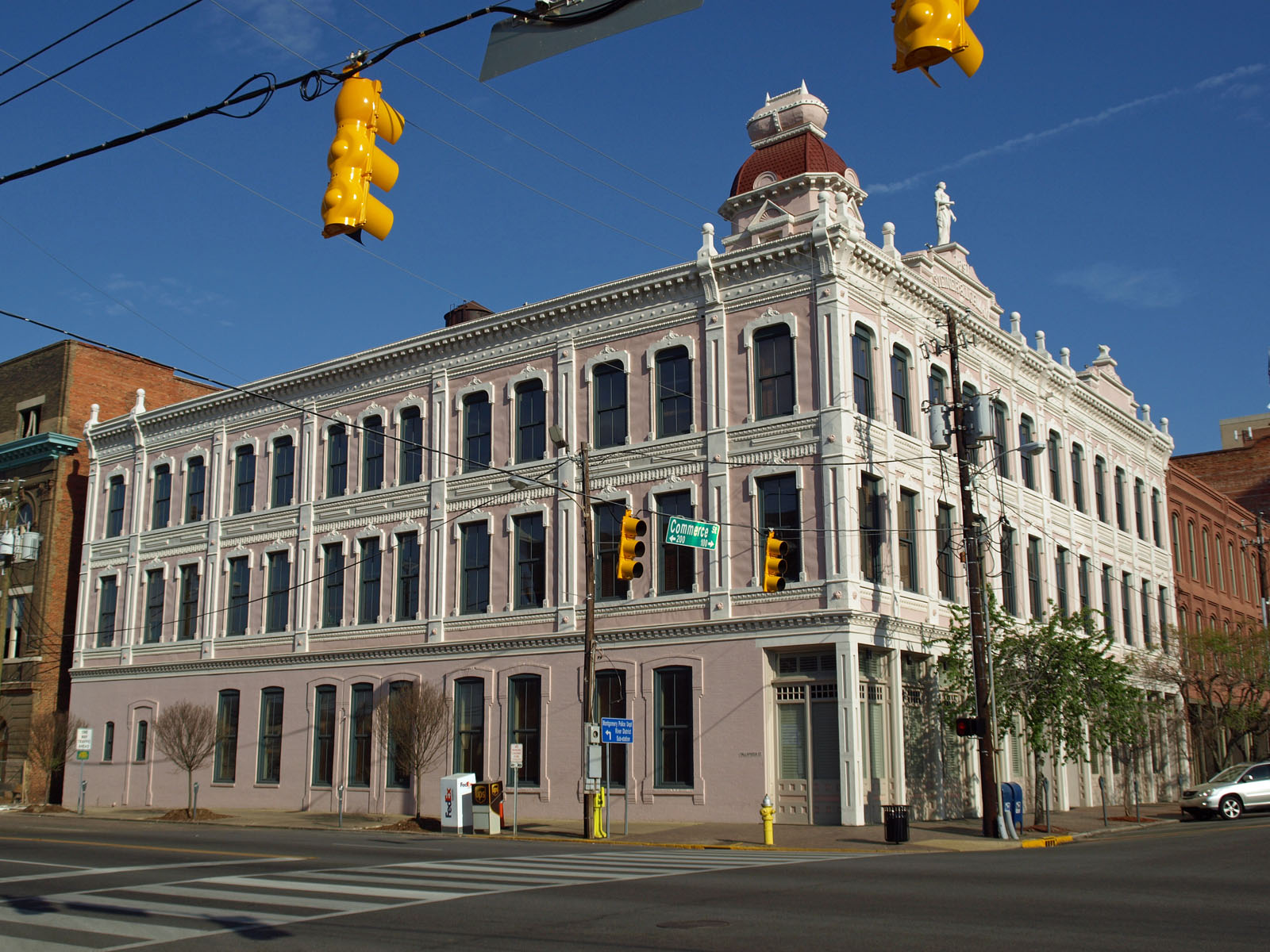
- The Steiner-Lobman and Teague Hardware Buildings in 2009

- Location within Alabama Location within the United States
- Location: 184 and 172 Commerce Street, Montgomery, Alabama
- Coordinates: 32°22′47″N 86°18′42″W
- Area: 0.3 acres (0.12 ha)
- Built: 1891
- Architectural style: Italianate
- NRHP reference No.: 79000397
- Added to NRHP: January 31, 1979

The Steiner–Lobman and Teague Hardware Buildings are historic buildings in Montgomery, Alabama, U.S. They were built by businessmen Louis Steiner and Nathan Lobman circa 1891 for their dry goods store. By 1895, the Southern building was sold to William Martin Teague, the owner of the Teague Hardware Company. The buildings remained in the respective families as late as the 1970s. They have been listed on the National Register of Historic Places since January 31, 1979.
