= Old Homestead (Aberdeen, Mississippi) =

Historic house in Mississippi, United States

- U.S. National Register of Historic Places
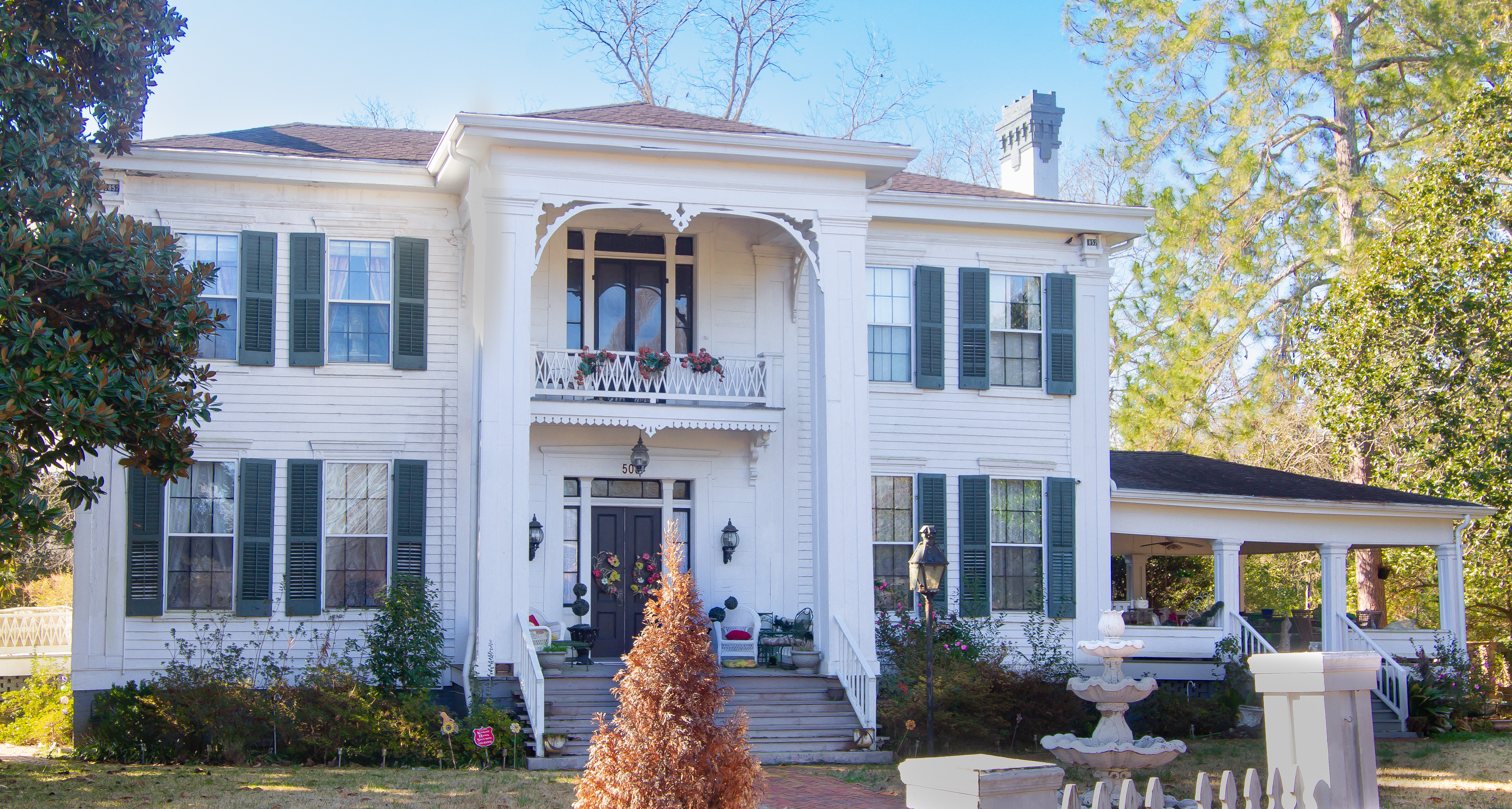

- Location within Mississippi Location within the United States
- Location: 503 W. Commerce, Aberdeen, Mississippi
- Coordinates: 33°49′29″N 88°32′56″W
- Area: 2.5 acres (1.0 ha)
- Built: c.1852
- Built by: Dr. George Augustus Sykes,
- Architectural style: Greek Revival, Gothic Revival
- MPS: Aberdeen MRA
- NRHP reference No.: 88000124
- Added to NRHP: February 22, 1988

The Old Homestead in Aberdeen, Mississippi was built in c.1852. It has also been known as Dr. George Augustus Sykes House and Julian T. Evans House. It was listed on the National Register of Historic Places in 1988. The listing includes 2 contributing buildings.

The house is eclectic with elements of Greek Revival architecture and Gothic Revival architecture. The dominant feature of the front facade is a two-story portico in the central bay of five bays. The portico is decorated by pierced archivolts with pendants between its two columns and between the columns and matching pilasters on the house.

A barn on the property was, as of 1988, the only high style Gothic Revival ancillary building in Aberdeen.

In 1988, it was still occupied by a descendant of Dr. George Augustus Sykes, for whom the house was built.

In 2006, The Old Homestead was put up for auction by Sykes descendant Boonie Evans, and on April 24 the home was purchased by Caius and Linda Dodd along with some of its original furnishings.
