= Reuben Davis House =

United States national historic place

- U.S. National Register of Historic Places
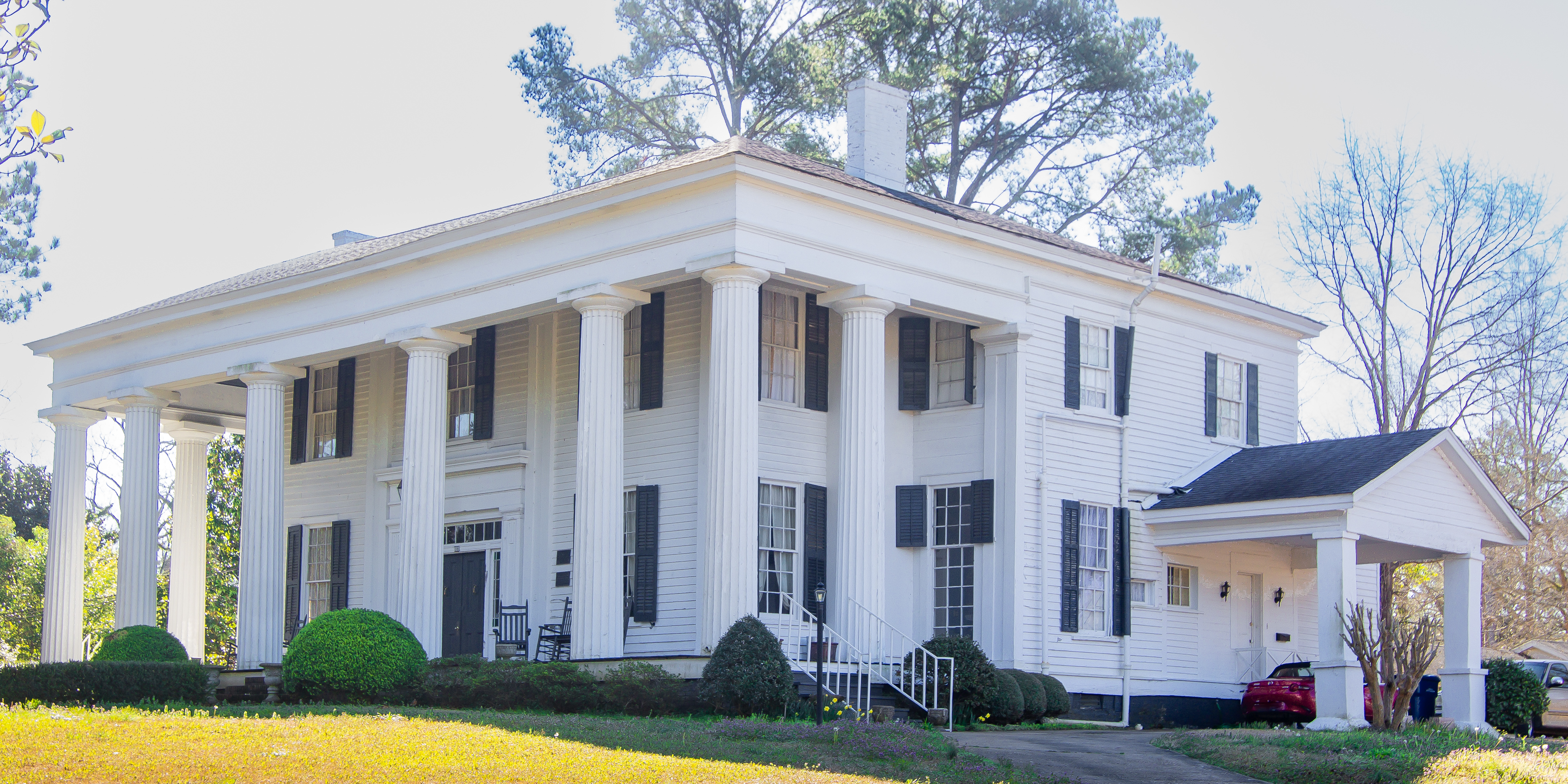

- Location within Mississippi Location within the United States
- Location: Aberdeen, Mississippi
- Nearest city: Tuscaloosa, Alabama
- Coordinates: 33°49′32″N 88°33′21″W
- Built: ca 1847
- Architectural style: Greek Revival
- NRHP reference No.: 78001622
- Added to NRHP: 16 November 1978

The Reuben Davis House, also known as Sunset Hill, is a U.S. national historic place located in Aberdeen, Mississippi. It is an impressive two-story antebellum mansion that was constructed between 1847 and 1853. Well known as the former residence of Reuben Davis, a prominent attorney, statesman, and author, the property has important historical connections for both the town of Aberdeen and Mississippi.

== History ==
=== Design and construction ===
The Reuben Davis House is an imposing example of the Greek Revival style that was popular in the prosperous South during the mid-19th Century. The original structure was built in 1847 by D.F. Alexander and then remodeled and expanded by William Cunningham in 1853. The house expresses major stylistic references to Asher Benjamin's The Practical House Carpenter (1830) and Practice of Architecture (1833).

=== Location ===
The city of Aberdeen was incorporated in 1837. According to an article featured in the Aberdeen Examiner, the city is described as containing more antebellum homes than any other Mississippi town of a comparable size. In the mid-19th century, the community grew from the development of a cotton port on the Tombigbee River. The town was made the county seat in 1849 and had a population of approximately 5,000 by the 1850 census. However, the prosperity and economic growth declined after 1850 when the Mobile and Ohio Railway Company constructed a line eight miles west of the town.

=== Reuben Davis ===
Reuben Davis (January 18, 1813 – October 14, 1890) was a prominent figure in 19th century Mississippi. He served as a prosecuting attorney for Mississippi's sixth judicial district from 1835 to 1839, and a judge of the high court of appeals in 1842. During the Mexican–American War he was a colonel in the Second Regiment of Mississippi Volunteers. In 1855 he was elected to the Mississippi House of Representatives and in 1857 to the U.S. House of Representatives for the Thirty-fifth and Thirty-sixth Congress. In 1861 he withdrew from this position to become the Monroe County candidate for the state secession convention. That same year he became a Mississippi representative to the Confederate Congress in Richmond, Virginia. During the Civil War he was a brigadier general in the Confederate Army. Following the Civil War, Davis returned to Aberdeen to resume his law practice. He purchased Sunset Hill in 1869. It was at this residence that Davis raised his family (with his second wife) and wrote the historical reference Recollections of Mississippi and Mississippians. He remained at Sunset Hill until his death in 1890 and was buried at the Odd Fellows Cemetery. His wife died 22 years later, in 1912. Prior to her death, she had requested that her body be laid in state on top of the grand piano in her parlor and surrounded with roses; a wish which was honored.

=== Modern times ===
Over the next 36 years, the property changed owners multiple times. One of the owners, from 1937 to 1943, was a grandniece of Reuben Davis, Mrs. Edmonia Nichols. During the 1940s the house was utilized as an apartment complex and its condition deteriorated. In 1948 the property and the one acre on which it now stands was sold to Drs. Chester and Catherine Brummett. In 1961 Sunset Hill was sold to Mr. & Mrs. W. Emerson Jones. The Jones' made substantial improvements and renovations during their ownership of the property.

The U.S. Department of the Interior added Sunset Hill (listed as the Reuben Davis House) to The National Register of Historic Places in November 1978. The Mississippi Department of Archives and History officially designated Sunset Hill as a Mississippi Landmark in February 1987. The house was sold in 1992, and again in 1997 to its current owners. Additional renovations have taken place over the last 15 years, including restoration of the Reuben Davis office.

== Architecture ==
The architecture of Sunset Hill is described with great detail in the National Register Form:

The Reuben Davis House is a two-story frame residence situated prominently on the south side of Commerce Street, just west of the Aberdeen town center. The first of its two construction phases occurred in 1847, with expansion/remodeling taking place in 1853. Striking variations in the interior millwork and the uneven floor in the second-story center hall attest to the two building programs.

The north (front) elevation features a Doric-order hexastyle portico with eight massive fluted columns. The narrower inter-columniation of the two outer bays, corresponding to the two recessed side galleries, emphasizes the three center bays. Further articulating the five bays of the north wall are paneled pilasters, two of which flank the central frontispiece entrance inspired by Plate 28 of Asher Benjamin's The Practical House Carpenter.

The portico is crowned by a low-rise metal-seamed hip roof with ridge pole running east-west, perpendicular to twin hip-roof extensions which share a central valley on the east and west sides of the rear section of the house. On the east elevation the side gallery extends out from the main house, with two chimneys rising on the north and south ends of the rear section. The side gallery on the west elevation is continuous with the rear section, with gable-roof porte-cochère attached. The south (rear) elevation has a one-story gable-roof children's nursery with an exterior end chimney at the west corner of the facade. A shed-roof screened sun porch and gable-roof kitchen, both later additions, are located on the east side. The house is supported by a brick foundation wall and has a dug cellar.

The original kitchen was located in a structure, no longer extant, on the southwest side, connected to the house by a walkway now used as the porte-cochère. A carriage house, barn, and slaves' cabins were located south of the residence in an area now subdivided and occupied by several smaller homes.

The conventional center-hall interior plan is varied by the addition of a back service stair on the southwest end of the house, leading originally to a second-floor hallway that provided access to the north and south chambers on the west side of the house. The former hall, blocked off and used for closet space, extended west to the second-floor center hall. On the first floor the center hall runs the full length of the house, providing access to the four main rooms; a double-run staircase leads to the second floor.

Benjamin-meander fretwork on the pilasters of the frontispiece entrance is repeated on the two Asher Benjamin-inspired chimney pieces in the north and south parlors on the east side. The chimney piece on the northwest wall has a Greek key design on the frieze, with Benjamin-meanders on the pilasters. The first-floor chimney pieces on the west side of the house vary considerably: that in the north room has a projecting, flat-faced pediment with acroteria supporting the shelf; the one in the south room features simple wood trim and curved shelf; and the smaller-scale nursery chimney piece is enriched with an inset four-pointed arch, imposts, pilasters, and bases. The second-floor chimney pieces all share similar Greek Revival characteristics, each decorated with pilasters and entablature.

Millwork on the first floor displays interesting period variations. Doorways and windows in the parlors feature battered and eared architrave trim with paneled transoms, while in the southwest parlor the window and door trim is symmetrically banded with corner blocks embellished with turned rosettes.

== Tourism ==
Given its rich history and cultural significance, Sunset Hill attracts a number of visitors each year. The home was featured in the 2013 Aberdeen Pilgrimage and Christmas Holiday Home Tour. In the future, the residents may open select bedrooms to the public as a "bed and breakfast."

== Gallery ==
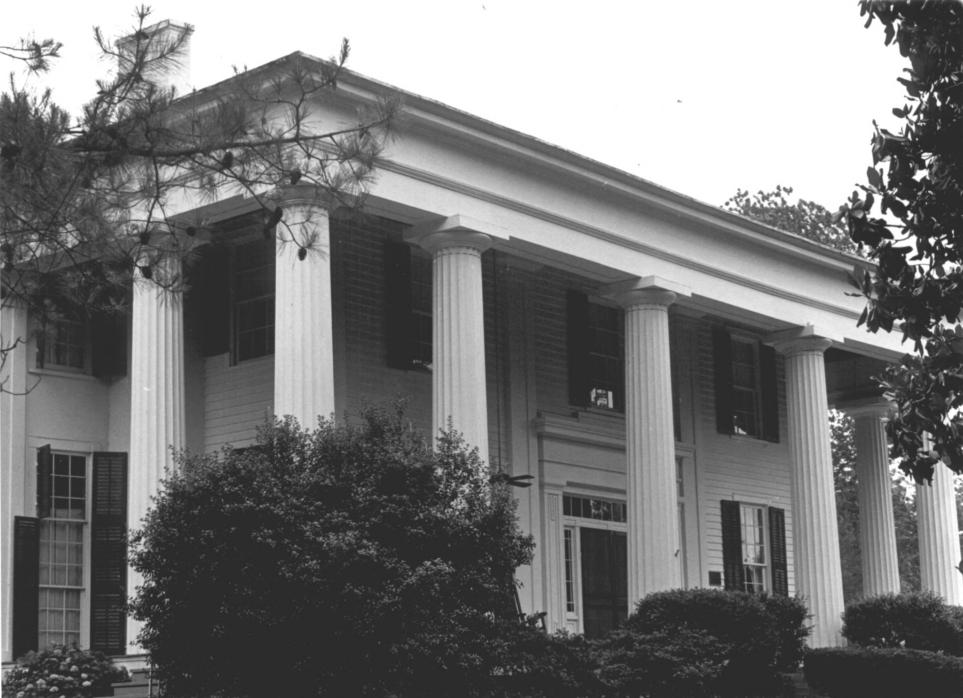
North (facade) elevation; view to the southwest.

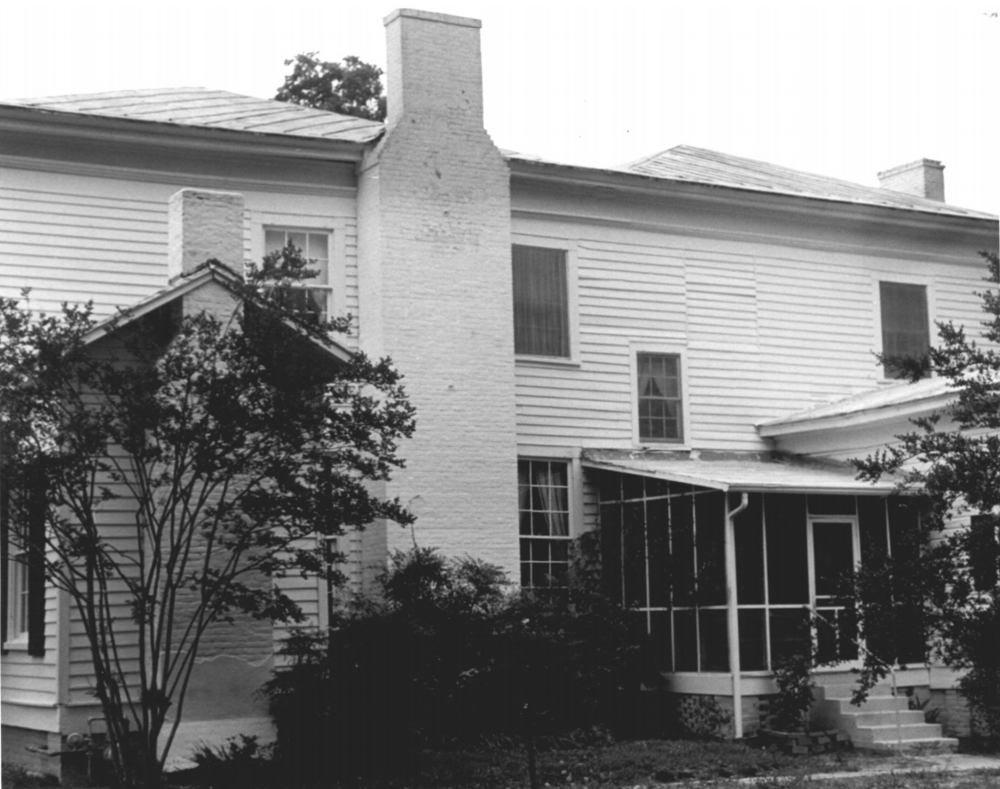
South (rear) elevation; view to the north.

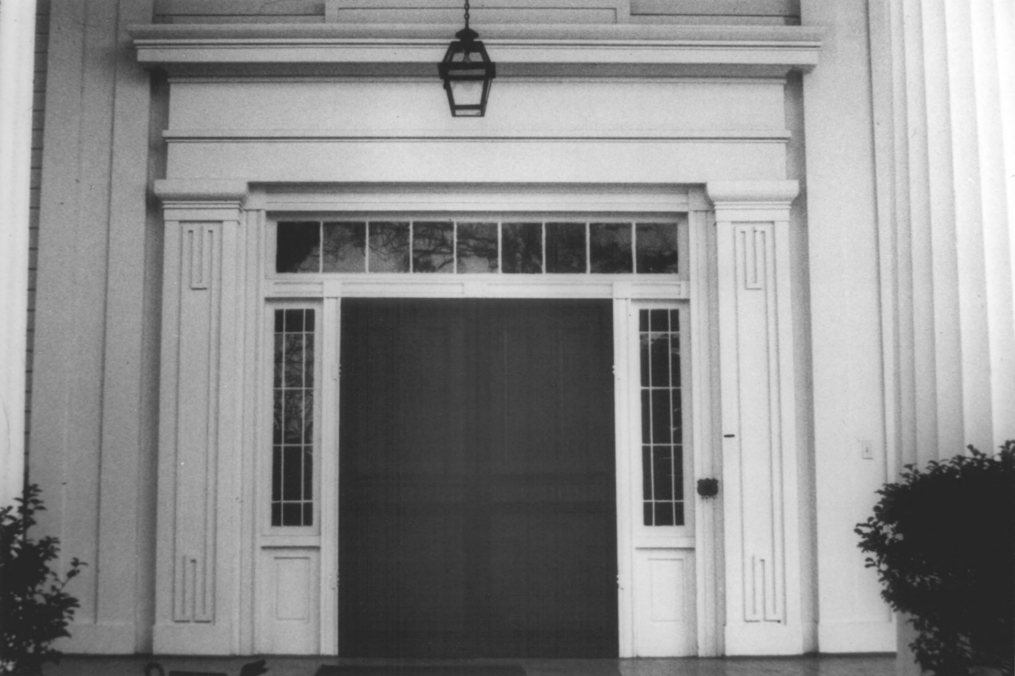
Asher Benjamin-inspired frontispiece entrance; north (facade) elevation.

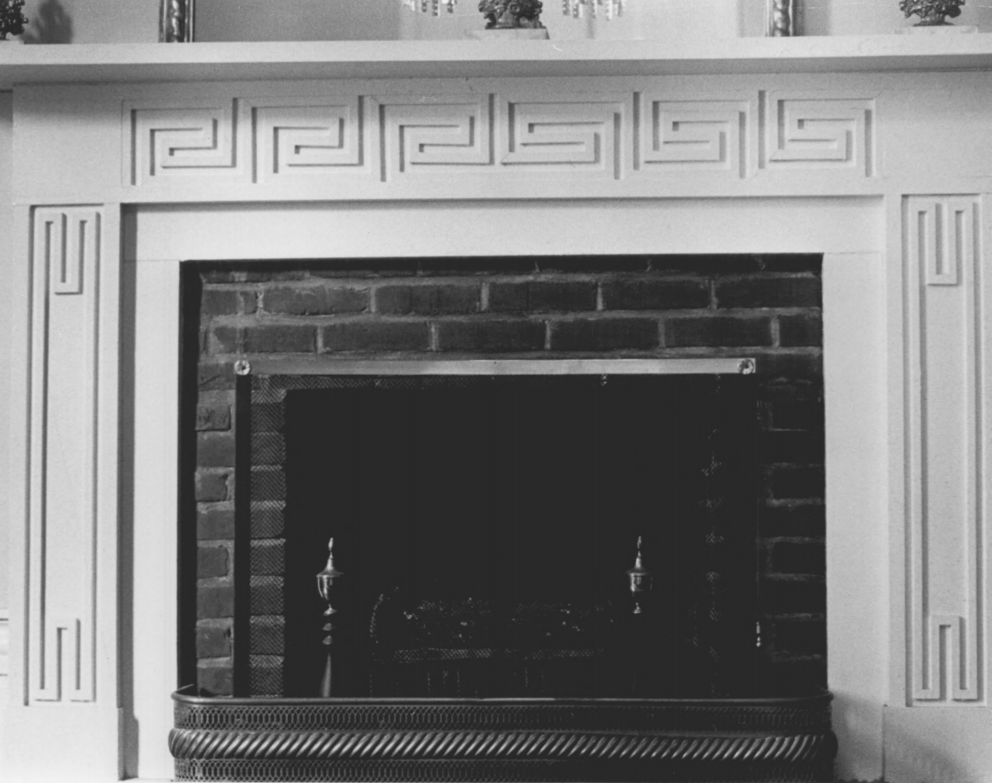
Chimney piece, southeast parlor (east wall).
