= 2010 Yazoo City tornado =

2010 EF4 tornado in Mississippi, U.S

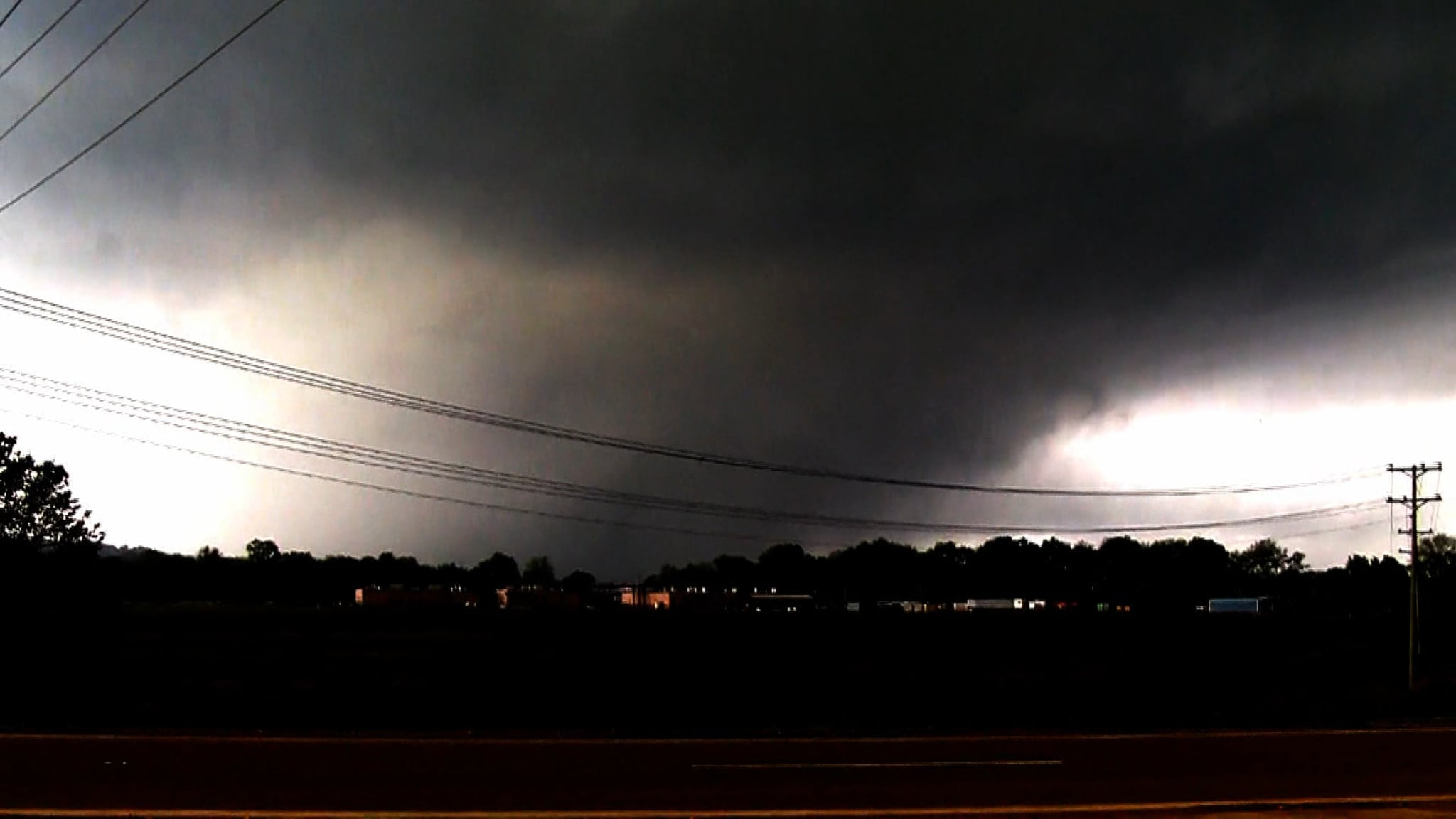
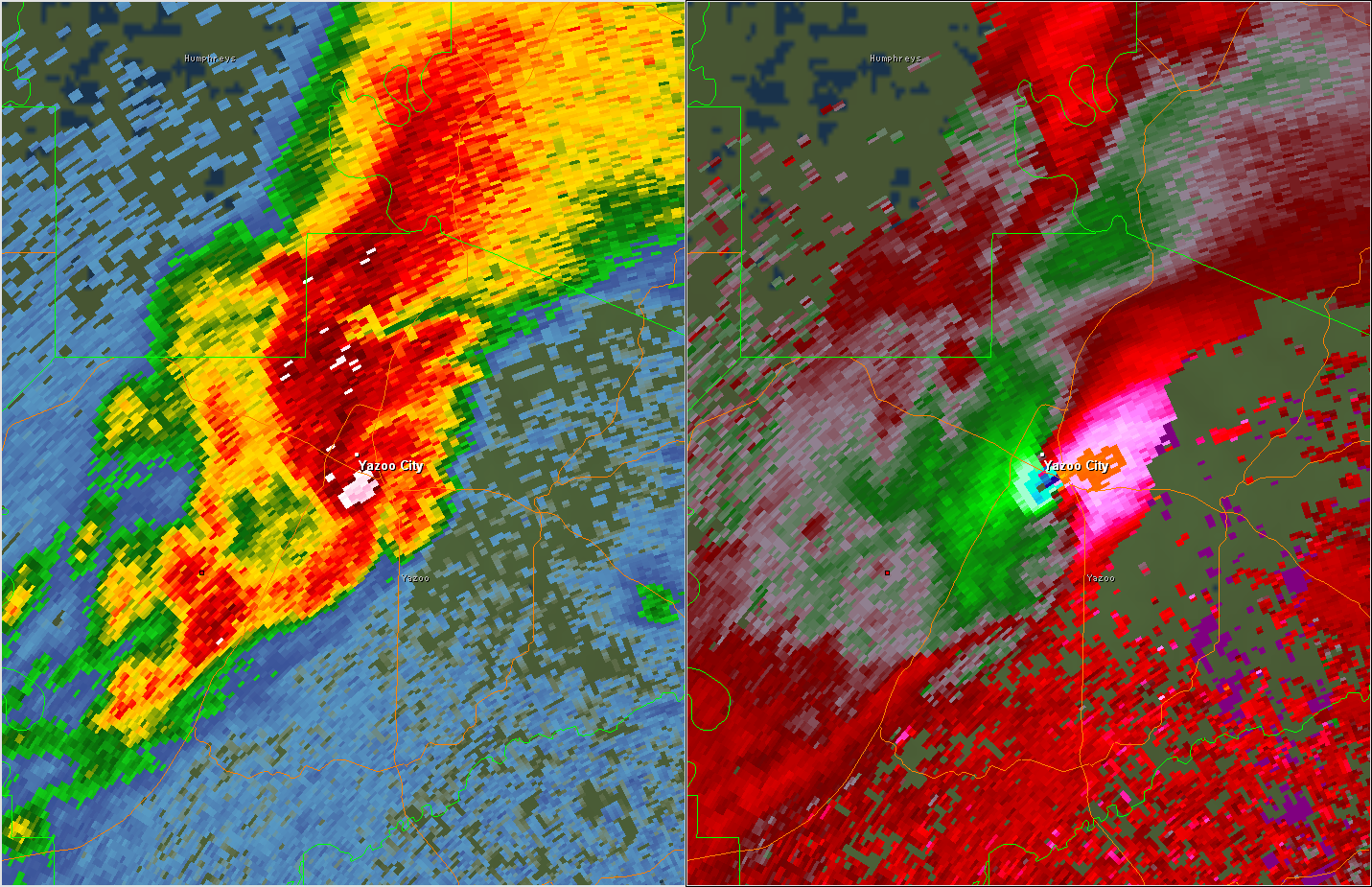
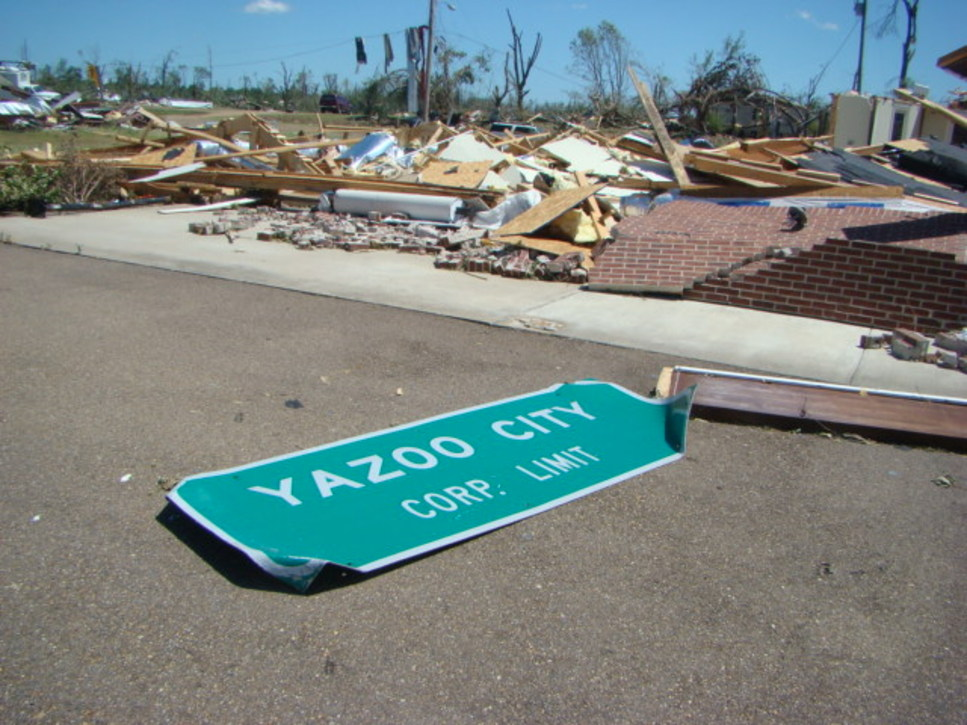
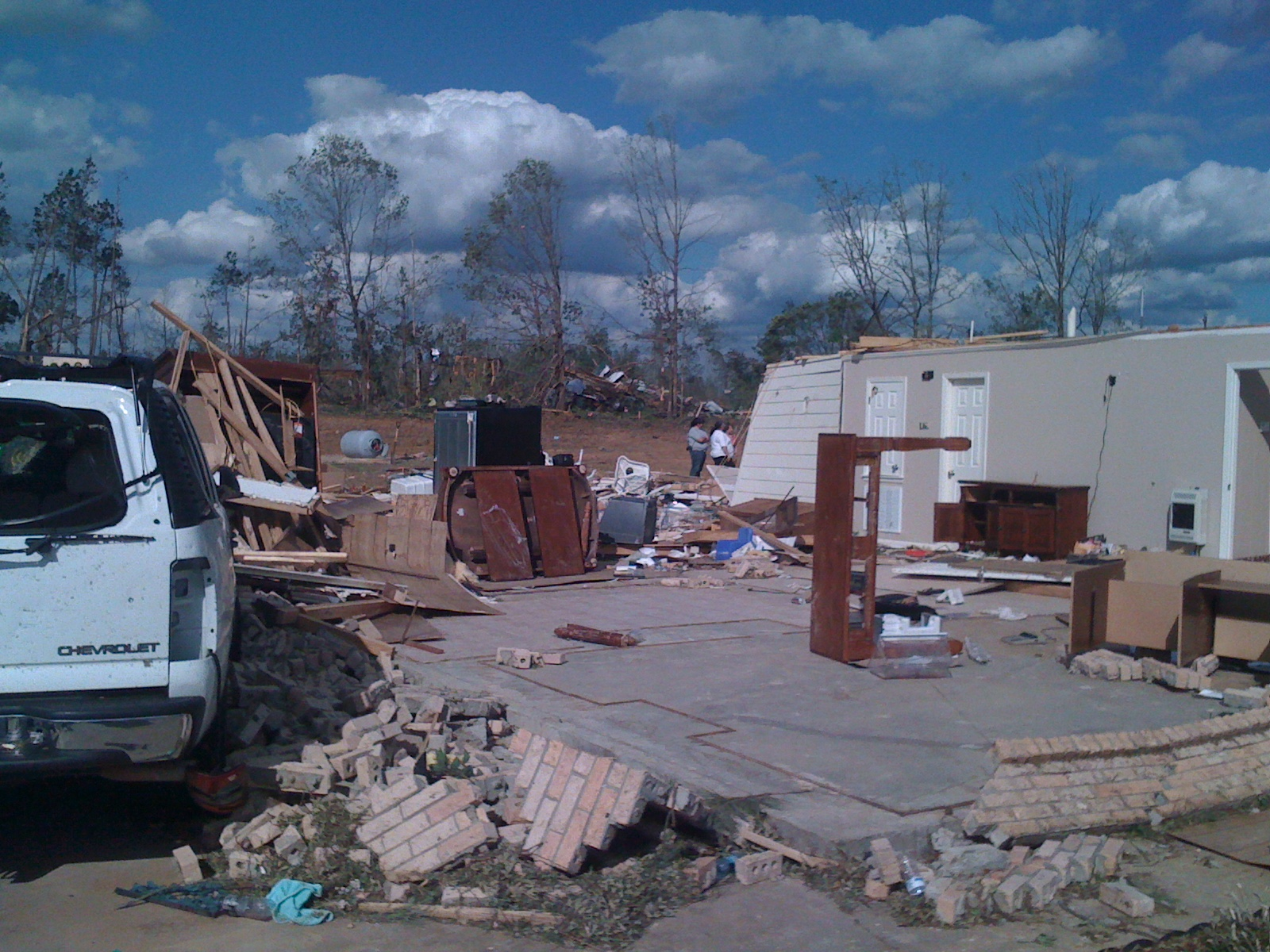
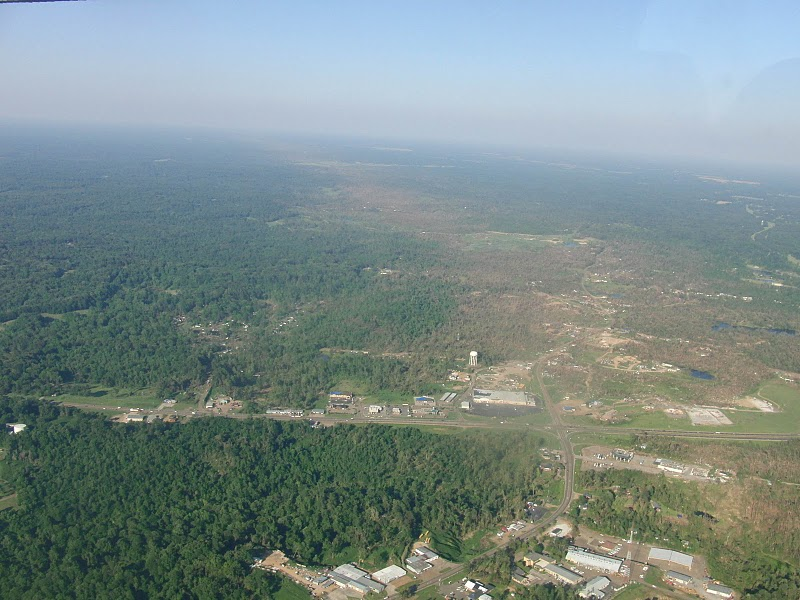
- Clockwise from top: The tornado on approach to Yazoo City; the town sign for Yazoo City knocked over, along with the ruins of a large brick building; aerial imagery of widespread destruction in Yazoo City after the tornado; high-end EF3 damage to a well-built home near Weir; NEXRAD radar imagery of the tornado near peak intensity, left side showed a debris ball evident on reflectivity and right side showed an intense velocity couplet.

Meteorological history
- Formed: April 24, 2010, 11:09 a.m. CDT (UTC–05:00)
- Dissipated: April 24, 2010, 1:53 p.m. CDT (UTC–05:00)
- Duration: 2 hours, 44 minutes

EF4 tornado
- on the Enhanced Fujita scale
- Max width: 3,080 yd (1.75 mi; 2.82 km)
- Path length: 152.66 mi (245.68 km)
- Highest winds: 170 mph (270 km/h)

Overall effects
- Fatalities: 10
- Injuries: 146
- Damage: $409.5 million (2010 USD)
- Areas affected: Louisiana: Madison Parish Mississippi: Warren County, Sharkey County, Yazoo County (specifically Yazoo City), Holmes County, Attala County, Choctaw County, Oktibbeha County
- Part of the Tornado outbreak of April 22–25, 2010 and Tornadoes of 2010

During the morning and afternoon (Note: All times in the article occurred in Central Daylight Time unless specified otherwise.) of April 24, 2010, a large, long-tracked, and destructive EF4 tornado impacted several towns and communities across the U.S. states of Louisiana and Mississippi. The tornado caused 10 fatalities and 146 injuries during its 152.66-mile-long (245.68-kilometer) track. It traveled 138.93 miles (223.59 km) through Mississippi, making it the fourth-longest path on record in the state. The damage costs were estimated at $409.5 million (2010 USD). (Note: Any damage estimate afterward, unless stated otherwise, is estimated in 2010 dollars.) The tornado occurred during a multi-day tornado outbreak that spanned from April 22 to April 25. It received an EF4 rating on the Enhanced Fujita scale, with maximum estimated winds of 170 miles per hour (270 kilometers per hour) based on two destroyed structures in Yazoo City and near Durant. This was the year's first violent (EF4+) tornado and the deadliest of the 2010 season. It was also considered Mississippi's worst natural disaster since Hurricane Katrina almost five years earlier. The tornado is also sometimes referred to as the Yazoo City–Durant tornado or simply the Yazoo City tornado.

The tornado formed from an intense supercell 6 miles (9.7 km) west of Tallulah, Louisiana, and almost immediately inflicted EF3 damage to structures and power poles. It maintained its intensity before crossing the Mississippi River into Mississippi. The tornado inflicted severe damage to structures and vegetation near the communities of Eagle Bend and Valley Park. It then inflicted EF4 damage in southern Yazoo City. Homes and businesses were demolished, and severe tree damage occurred. The tornado severely damaged homes in Holmes County; one home near Durant received EF4 damage. After this, the tornado mostly stayed in open forested areas in Attala County. It then struck rural neighborhoods in southern Choctaw County, where the maximum rated damage was high-end EF3, with estimated winds of 165 mph (266 km/h). The tornado weakened afterward before lifting north of Sturgis. Initially, surveyors were uncertain whether it was one continuous tornado or a series of tornadoes, until they concluded that it was a single track. Along its path, the National Weather Service (NWS) office in Jackson, Mississippi, issued three tornado emergencies in multiple counties.

It was the largest tornado on record in Mississippi for 10 years, with a maximum width of 3,080 yards (2,820 metres). The tornado was, at the time, the ninth-deadliest on record in Mississippi, and the deadliest in the state since 1992. It was the first violent tornado to form in Mississippi in April since 1978. Along the tornado's path, 849 homes, businesses, and structures were damaged or destroyed. (Note: The figure combines the number of impacted structures listed in a FEMA Pre-Mitigation Assessment.) Hundreds of residents across the affected counties were left without electricity, and agriculture and timber suffered severe damage.

After the tornado, President Barack Obama declared a federal disaster in Mississippi. The governors of Louisiana and Mississippi, Bobby Jindal and Haley Barbour, declared states of emergencies for the affected parish and counties in their respective states. National Guardsmen were deployed to Yazoo City, and search and rescue operations occurred across the affected areas. State officials, local businesses, and non-profit groups such as The Salvation Army relieved affected areas. The recovery and cleanup effort removed tens of millions of tons of debris throughout the tornado's path.

== Meteorological synopsis ==
=== Episode narrative ===
==== Forecasting in advance ====
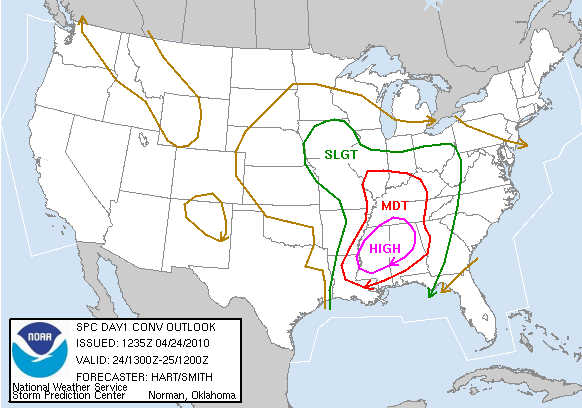
High risk for severe weather being issued by the Storm Prediction Center

On April 20, the American weather forecasting agency, Storm Prediction Center (SPC), first highlighted a severe weather risk for the lower Mississippi River basin region on April 24. A boundary layer, or moist air moving into a region, and strong wind shear, or the change in wind speed with height, indicated potential tornadic activity. Large hail and damaging winds were also expected. A large upper-level trough was forecast to move slowly across the central United States and center over Illinois. A strong southwesterly flow aloft was forecast to spread across the Mississippi Valley into the Gulf Coast Region.

==== Day of the event ====
At 12:57 a.m. Central Daylight Time (CDT) on April 24, the SPC designated a high risk for severe weather over portions of Louisiana, Mississippi, Alabama, and Arkansas. The hazard included a 30% hatched risk, or an enhanced probability of strong tornadoes, severe hail, and strong, damaging winds. A large upper-level trough was forecast to move across the Central United States into Illinois and Missouri. A cold front moved eastward from the central southern Mississippi River Valley into the Ohio River Valley. Severe thunderstorms developed in the morning; conditions were expected to be more favorable throughout the day. Potent wind shear was expected to spread across the warm sector, a region of warm air ahead of the cold front.

Discrete, cyclic supercells were forecast over the high-risk zone in the mid-morning and afternoon. Forecast soundings, observations that decipher the environment of an area, over the high-risk zone showed a 60–70 mph (95–115 km/h) low-level jet (LLJ), or a fast-moving band of winds in the atmosphere. An enlarged hodograph loop, which plots winds with soundings from Earth's atmosphere, was supported by the strength of the LLJ. The storm relative helicity, which measures the potential for updraft rotation, approached 300-600 joules per kilogram, favorable for significant tornadic supercells. Also, the mid-level convective available potential energy, the measure of available energy for thunderstorm development, was sufficient for the formation of supercells.

At 9:31 a.m. CDT, an upper-air analysis showed a negatively tilted trough, reflecting a deepening surface low, with an embedded jet stream heading east-northeast into the Ark-La-Tex region. The jet stream was expected to enter the middle to lower Ohio Valley later in the afternoon. Morning convection was expected to move into the Tennessee Valley and become elevated, no longer surface-based, as it moved into the Cumberland Plateau and Appalachian Mountains.

=== Event narrative ===
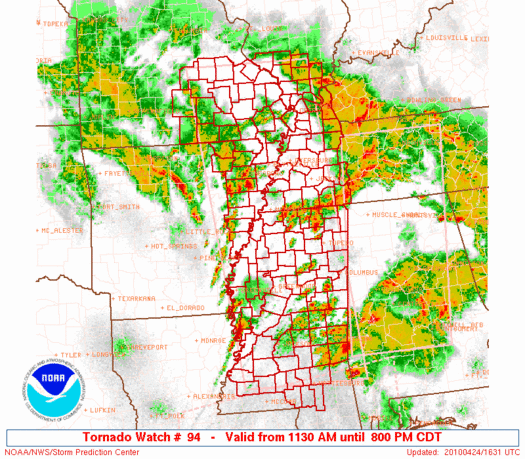
PDS tornado watch issued for several states, including most of Mississippi and portions of Arkansas, Tennessee, Kentucky, Illinois, and Missouri.

At 10:28 a.m. CDT, a couple of large thunderstorms in southeastern Mississippi demonstrated supercell characteristics. The storms were forecast to move into Alabama late in the morning. Large-scale ascent continued downstream, and further destabilization of the warm sector occurred over the lower Mississippi Valley. Favorable low-level wind shear and a moist unstable boundary layer maintained the possibility of strong tornadoes throughout the afternoon. Multiple discrete supercells began ahead of the developing quasi-linear convective system (QLCS), or a line of thunderstorms riding along a cold front.

==== Particularly Dangerous Situation ====
At 11:30 a.m. CDT, a particularly dangerous situation (PDS) tornado watch was in effect across several states, with a high probability of multiple significant tornadoes, large hail, and strong straight-line winds up to 80 mph (130 km/h). A shortwave trough rotated across the area. The SPC noted that tornadic supercells were already progressing across Mississippi, with strong wind shear profiles expected to spread north and east. A squall line was also moving rapidly across northern Arkansas and forecast to evolve into a strong QLCS with intense, damaging winds.

== Tornado summary ==
=== Warning history ===
Warning chronology of the tornado
| Type | Counties and Parishes included | Time (CDT) | Ref. |
|---|---|---|---|
| Confirmed | Carroll, LA; Franklin, LA; Madison, LA; Issaquena, MS; Sharkey, MS; Warren, MS | 10:57 a.m. | |
| PDS | Madison, LA; Carroll, LA; Issaquena, MS; Sharkey, MS; Warren, MS | 11:21 a.m. | |
| Emergency | Yazoo, MS; Issaquena, MS; Sharkey, MS; Warren, MS | 11:48 a.m. | |
| Emergency | Yazoo, MS; Attala, MS; Holmes, MS; Madison, MS | 12:24 p.m. | |
| Emergency | Attala, MS; Holmes, MS; Choctaw, MS; Montgomery, MS; Carroll, MS | 12:57 p.m. | |

This is a list of all types of tornado warnings issued by NWS Jackson, Mississippi. In total, three tornado emergencies were issued.

=== Louisiana and along the Mississippi River ===
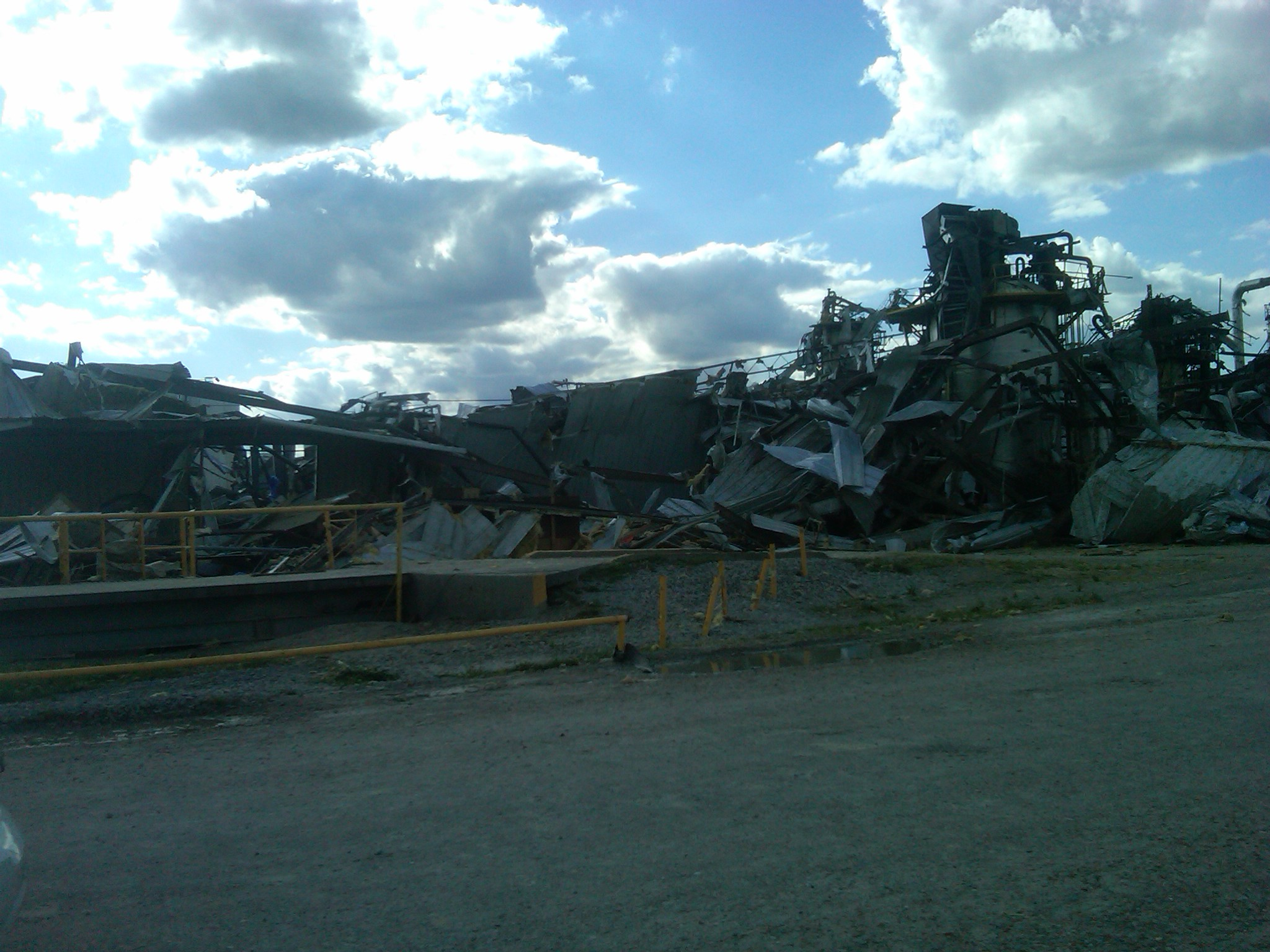
The Complex Chemical Industrial Plant near the community of Omega was destroyed by the tornado.

The tornado touched down in Madison Parish, west of Tallulah, at 11:09 a.m. CDT. The tornado quickly inflicted EF3 damage, downing a couple of high-tension power poles along Interstate 20 and flipping a tractor-trailer, injuring the driver. The tornado traveled northeast through rural areas, carving cycloidal marks onto fields and snapping trees and power poles along US 80. The tornado maintained intensity as it crossed Willow Bayou Road, heavily damaging several homes. It also damaged vehicles and tractors and snapped trees. The tornado crossed Parker Road, causing intense ground scarring. A few framed homes sustained extensive roof damage or lost exterior walls, and a double-wide mobile home was leveled. The tornado then snapped an electrical transmission tower at low-end EF3 intensity and snapped or uprooted several nearby trees.

The tornado maintained EF3 intensity, crossing US 65 and Levee Road, and impacted the Complex Chemical Company plant just south of the community of Omega. At the plant, it destroyed all warehouses, electrical infrastructure, and offices. The piping system sustained severe damage, and communications went offline. Three rail cars derailed, seven storage tanks overturned, a crane crumpled, and materials were strewn across the site. When the tornado struck, 14 employees were working in the plant. All survived, though three received minor injuries. At 11:21 a.m. CDT, the NWS issued a PDS tornado warning for the rest of Madison and Carroll parishes and counties in Mississippi. Storm spotters confirmed a large tornado was ongoing, traveling at 55 mph (89 km/h). The tornado crossed the Mississippi River into Mississippi shortly thereafter.

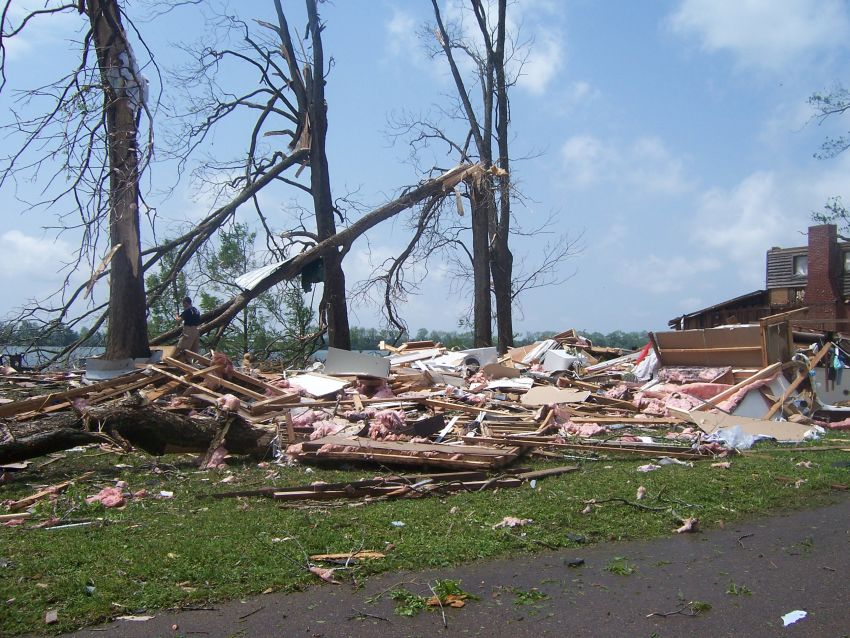
A home in the Eagle Bend community was destroyed.

The tornado entered Warren County, snapping or uprooting hardwood trees along the Mississippi River. The tornado briefly crossed Eagle Lake before impacting a neighborhood west of Eagle Bend. Several poorly built homes were heavily damaged or destroyed; a couple of them were unroofed, and multiple trees were snapped. The maximum assigned damage rating in the Eagle Bend area was high-end EF2, with estimated winds of 130 mph (210 km/h). The tornado briefly entered back into Madison Parish, Louisiana before re-entering Mississippi, moving towards Issaquena County.

=== Rest of Mississippi ===
The tornado turned sharply northward, downing several trees at EF2 intensity south of Cypress Lake. The tornado traversed US 61 south of Valley Park, snapping and uprooting trees in the Delta National Forest and destroying an outbuilding, or a separate building from a main home. The area received a high-end EF2 damage rating as the tornado went through the extreme southeastern portion of Sharkey County.

==== Yazoo County ====
The tornado entered Yazoo County, initially only uprooting trees. The tornado then crossed Satartia Road, causing significant roof damage to a home and demolishing a nearby utility building. Along Lake George, the tornado crossed over the area, and several trees were snapped or uprooted. The tornado tore through the southern Panther Swamp National Wildlife Refuge and Yazoo River, snapping and razing trees. The tornado crossed MS 3 north of Satartia. Along the highway, several homes experienced moderate roof damage, and a couple of outbuildings were demolished. Trees were snapped and uprooted. Around the same time, the tornado showed an intense radar presentation, with a debris ball on reflectivity and a strong velocity couplet. Storm spotters also reported a large wedge tornado was on the ground, precipitating a tornado emergency for Yazoo, Issaquena, Sharkey, and Warren counties at 11:47 a.m. CDT.

The tornado began affecting Yazoo City as it crossed Judkins Road, downing several trees and dislodging two mobile homes from their units. A framed home had most of its roof ripped away, a couple of homes sustained moderate roof damage, and a single-wide mobile home was destroyed. A 31-year-old mother here was killed after shielding her three sons underneath a mattress, with the children surviving the tornado due to her action. The tornado crossed Ridge Road, where dozens of homes had minor to moderate structural damage. The tornado crossed Center Ridge Road, where a one-story brick home was mostly unroofed; two other homes sustained severe roof damage, and multiple trees were snapped. This area received a high-end EF2 damage rating. A few homes along Woodland Road had moderate to significant roof damage, and an outbuilding experienced major roof damage. The tornado reached a peak width of 3,080 yd (2,820 m) along the intersection of MS 149 and MS 16. As a result, it became the widest on record in Mississippi until the Bassfield–Soso tornado beat the record ten years later.

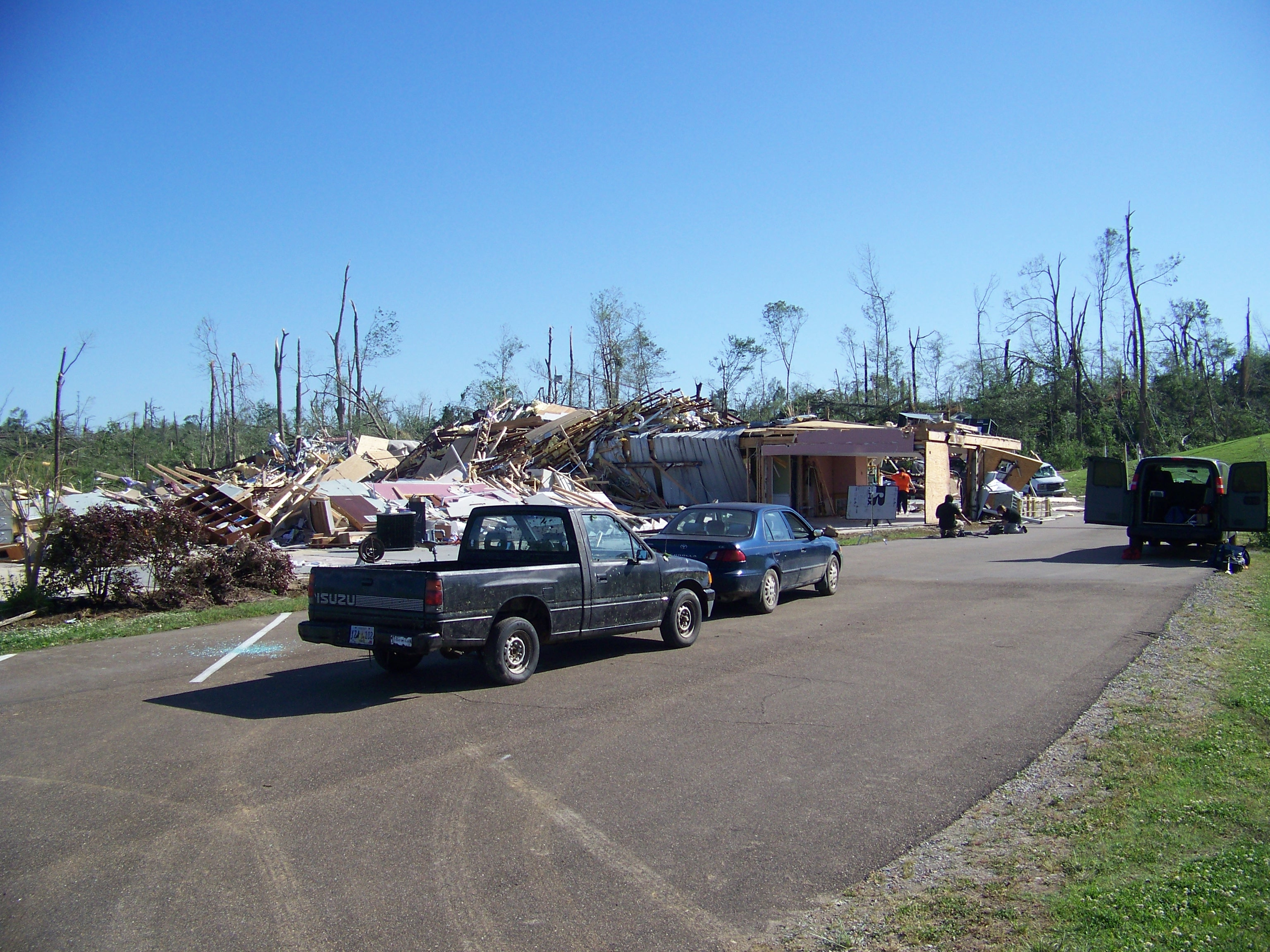
The Hillcrest Baptist Church was destroyed at low-end EF4 intensity

The tornado strengthened significantly as it hit areas along Learsville Road, leveling two metal buildings at mid-range EF3 intensity. Nearby, an automobile showroom lost significant portions of its roof. The tornado destroyed a single-wide mobile home, moderately damaged another home, and mostly unroofed an outbuilding. The tornado reached peak intensity at low-end EF4 strength along Bus Station Road. The Hillcrest Baptist Church was destroyed, with the church's steel I-beams bent. The church received an EF4 rating, with wind speeds estimated at 170 mph (270 km/h). One man was inside the church when the tornado struck; he survived with minor injuries. Several hardwood trees near the church were severely debarked and denuded. A Mississippi Department of Transportation maintenance building nearby was partially destroyed, with parts of its exterior and interior walls collapsing. A metal storage building adjacent to the maintenance building was destroyed. Nearby, a 5,000-pound (2,300-kilogram) concrete reinforced awning block was torn out and thrown 100 yd (90 m) away. The tornado then destroyed a funeral home, another metal building system, and a nearby outbuilding. A Peebles department store nearby was damaged. Inside, the manager and 15 customers took shelter in the back of the store. The Ribeye's Steakhouse sustained significant roof damage, and a separate outbuilding was destroyed.

Afterward, the tornado crossed Old Benton Road, leveling a poorly built home at mid-range EF3 intensity, with estimated wind speeds of 155 mph (250 km/h). Another home along the road was mostly leveled, with a few interior walls left standing. Nearby, several homes lost their exterior walls and roofs, and multiple mobile homes were either destroyed or were dislodged and rolled off their units. Outbuildings were also destroyed, and hardwood trees were snapped and debarked. The tornado exited the town afterward, mostly impacting rural wooded areas. A storage shed mostly collapsed, and several nearby trees were snapped. At 12:24 p.m. CDT, the NWS issued another tornado emergency for northeast Yazoo County and parts of Attala, Holmes, and Madison counties. The warning noted that the tornado had a history of producing significant and widespread damage, traveling at 50 mph (80 km/h).

The tornado then intensely damaged forested areas, destroying a couple of mobile homes and significantly damaging the roof of a frame home. A nearby home was badly damaged. The tornado destroyed a mobile home along Powell Road, which received a high-end EF2 damage rating, and another nearby home experienced significant roof damage. Another mobile home was demolished at the intersection of Mollett Road and Breakwater Drive, with several nearby trees uprooted. For the rest of the tornado's track in Yazoo County, several framed and mobile homes were significantly damaged or demolished, and trees were snapped or uprooted. Throughout Yazoo County, four people were killed, and 53 others were injured; all the fatalities occurred in mobile homes before the tornado entered Holmes County.

==== Holmes and Attala counties ====
Entering Holmes County, the tornado narrowed slightly to 2,600 yd (2,400 m) in width. The tornado traversed rural areas of Holmes County, causing extensive tree damage. The tornado then impacted areas around the community of Ebenezer, with the maximum damage rating at high-end EF2. A church sanctuary north of the community was destroyed; several trees were snapped, and mobile homes were demolished, killing a 70-year-old man who was inside one of them along Ebenezer Road. The tornado continued to inflict significant damage along Newport Road, demolishing a mobile home, causing extensive tree damage, and snapping power poles. The tornado made a sharp eastward turn across Springhill Road, destroying a single-wide mobile home. A framed home nearby was significantly damaged, and severe forestry damage was noted.

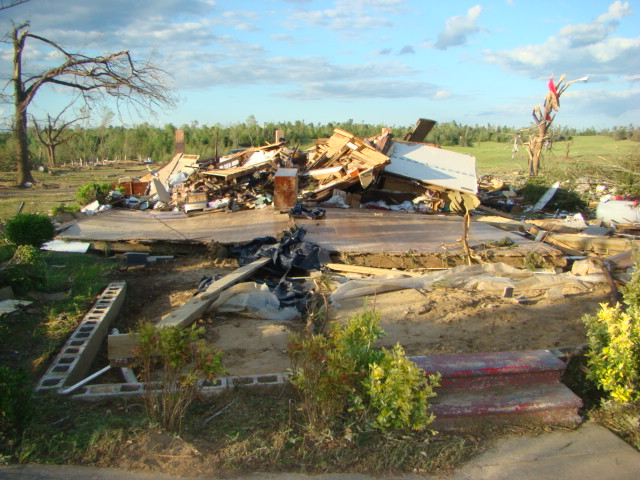
A home southwest of Durant was leveled at EF4 intensity.

The tornado intensified further, crossing Pickens-Garnett Road, mostly leveling a brick home at EF3 intensity, with estimated wind speeds of 155 mph (250 km/h). A nearby home had most of its exterior walls collapse; another home was unroofed and its exterior walls significantly damaged; and a couple of mobile homes were destroyed. The tornado maintained EF3 strength traversing south of Franklin. A well-built brick home, except for a few walls, was leveled and received a high-end EF3 damage rating. Several nearby trees were snapped or debarked, an outbuilding was demolished, and power lines were snapped. After snapping multiple trees, the tornado intensified to EF4 strength for the second time, leveling a home along Horton Road. A single-wide mobile home nearby was demolished, and several trees were snapped or uprooted.

The tornado crossed I-55 south of Durant, blowing several vehicles off the highway. Three members of the Vicksburg metal band Burning Windsor were traveling northbound when the tornado struck. The band's vehicle, trailer, and nearly all their musical equipment were destroyed. The debris from merchandise and instruments scattered along the interstate, and the car was tossed 30 yd (27 m). All three occupants survived the storm with minor to severe injuries. Two were taken by ambulance to local hospitals, where they were both treated for their injuries. At 12:57 p.m. CDT, another tornado emergency was issued for Attala and parts of Holmes, Choctaw, Montgomery, and Carroll counties. The tornado was traveling at 55 mph (90 km/h).

The tornado then entered Attala County, snapping or uprooting several trees. The tornado then unroofed significant portions of a home, snapping trees and power poles south of Possumneck. The tornado continued traversing rural areas, downing several trees, demolishing an outbuilding, and inflicting moderate roof damage. The tornado impacted several homes in Hesterville, causing significant roof damage—rated EF2—to a couple of them. The tornado crossed Natchez Trace Parkway, breaking wooden power poles and softwood trees along the road. The tornado then inflicted significant roof damage to a small home south of French Camp, along County Road 2133. Afterward, the tornado continued inflicting severe tree damage before exiting the county.

==== Choctaw and Oktibbeha counties ====
Entering Choctaw County, the tornado snapped or uprooted trees near the county line at EF2 intensity. Along MS 413, east of French Camp, the tornado intensified to high-end EF3 strength with estimated wind speeds of 165 mph (265 km/h). A well-built home, aside from a few interior walls, was demolished and received the aforementioned rating. The Crossroads Grocery store was destroyed as the cinderblock structure collapsed. The owner, his wife, and four other people sheltered in the store's freezer when the tornado struck; everyone survived with minor injuries. A steel fuel tank was uprooted and thrown into the store, landing against the freezer door. A couple of homes had most of their exterior walls collapse, and several others sustained significant roof damage, and several trees snapped. The tornado crossed Steward Weir Road, taking down the exterior walls of another home at EF3 intensity. A communications tower collapsed, along with a mobile home and an outbuilding. The Millsprings Church and its surrounding buildings sustained considerable roof damage. The tornado crossed the intersection of White and Prewitt Cemetery Road, demolishing several mobile homes at EF2 intensity. The tornado also inflicted roof damage to a home and significant timber damage.

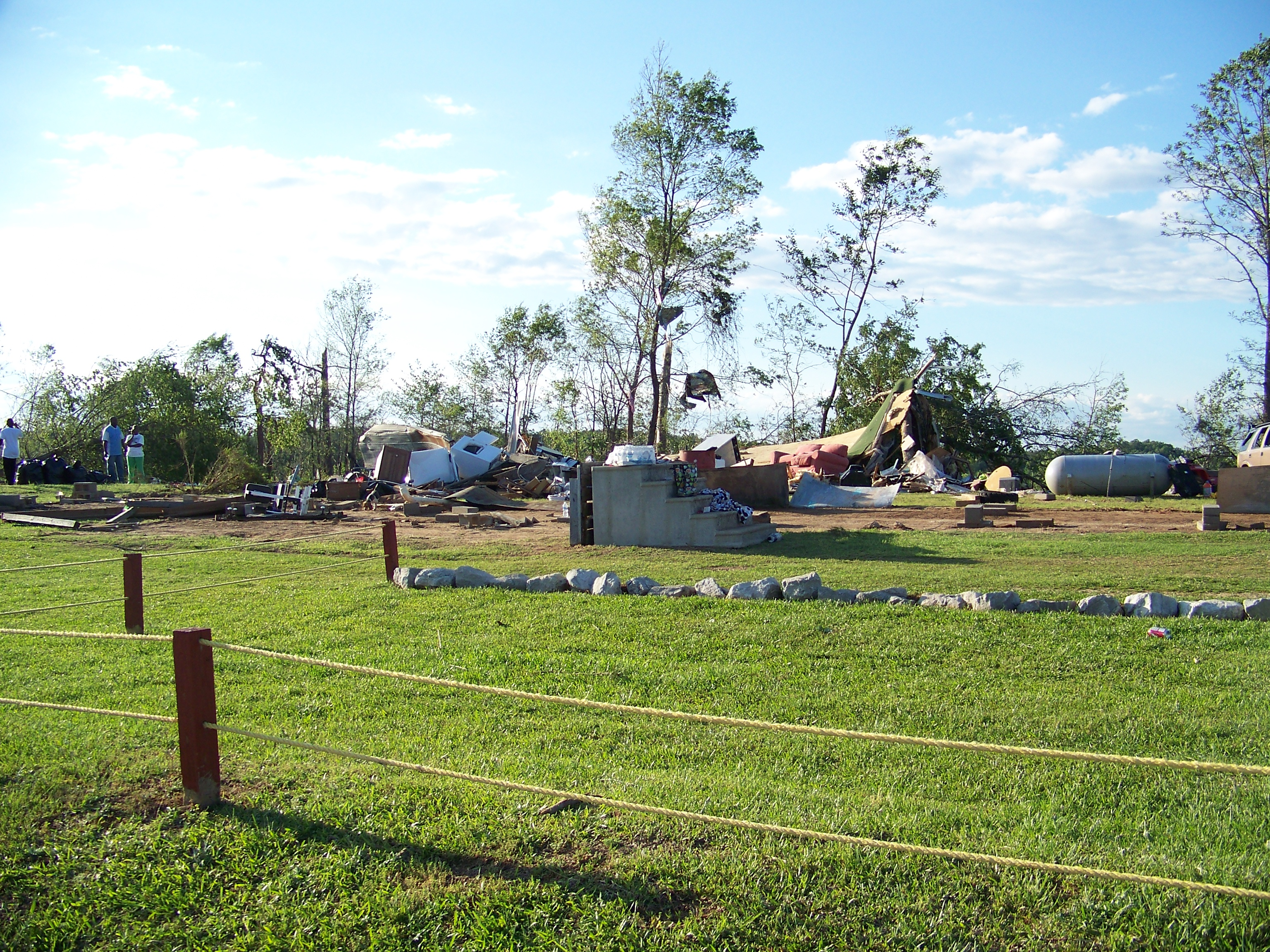
Mobile homes and conventional foundation homes were destroyed at EF3 intensity. Multiple fatalities were recorded in this neighborhood.

The tornado severely impacted a neighborhood along Pisgah and Dotson Roads, maintaining EF3 intensity. It demolished dozens of mobile homes and conventional foundation homes and threw multiple vehicles into the tree line. A few frail homes were leveled; a couple more were left with only a few interior walls standing. A poorly built home shifted off its foundation, and several hardwood and softwood trees were mostly snapped or debarked. Within this neighborhood, five people were killed. Afterward, the tornado weakened to EF2 intensity, causing heavy tree damage. The tornado struck the community of Chester, destroying an outbuilding and inflicting moderate damage to the Chester Baptist Church and homes. The tornado crossed Pensacola Road at EF2 strength, unroofing most of a brick home and downing trees. The tornado turned eastward, downing metal poles along Ecoplex Road, and breaking several trees along MS 9 at EF2 intensity. The tornado then traveled 2.87 mi (4.62 km) into Oktibbeha County, weakening to EF1 intensity before dissipating 5 mi (8.0 km) north of Sturgis at 1:53 p.m. CDT.

Overall, the tornado traveled 152.66 mi (245.68 km) with a peak width of 3,080 yd (2,820 m), which was the largest recorded in Mississippi at the time. The tornado's track in Mississippi made it the fourth-longest in the state's history. It was the first violent tornado to occur in Mississippi in April since 1978. The tornado became the longest-tracked tornado during the NEXRAD era, when advanced radars were introduced in 1988, until the Western Kentucky tornado in 2021. On April 25, the NWS preliminarily rated the tornado high-end EF3 on the Enhanced Fujita scale, with estimated wind speeds of 160 mph (260 km/h). The initial track began in Eagle Bend and went through Yazoo City to the Yazoo and Holmes counties border, with a width of 1.5 miles (2.4 km; 2,600 yd; 2,400 m). Later, at 9:30 p.m. CDT, NWS upgraded the tornado to a low-end EF4 rating, with wind speeds up to 170 mph (270 km/h), making it the first violent tornado in 2010. The path began near Tallulah and ended around Durant, with a length of 97 miles (156 km). The path width was also increased to 1.75 miles (2.82 km; 3,080 yd; 2,820 m). Later, after initial uncertainties, the track extended to 149 miles (240 km). The surveyors concluded it was one continuous path.

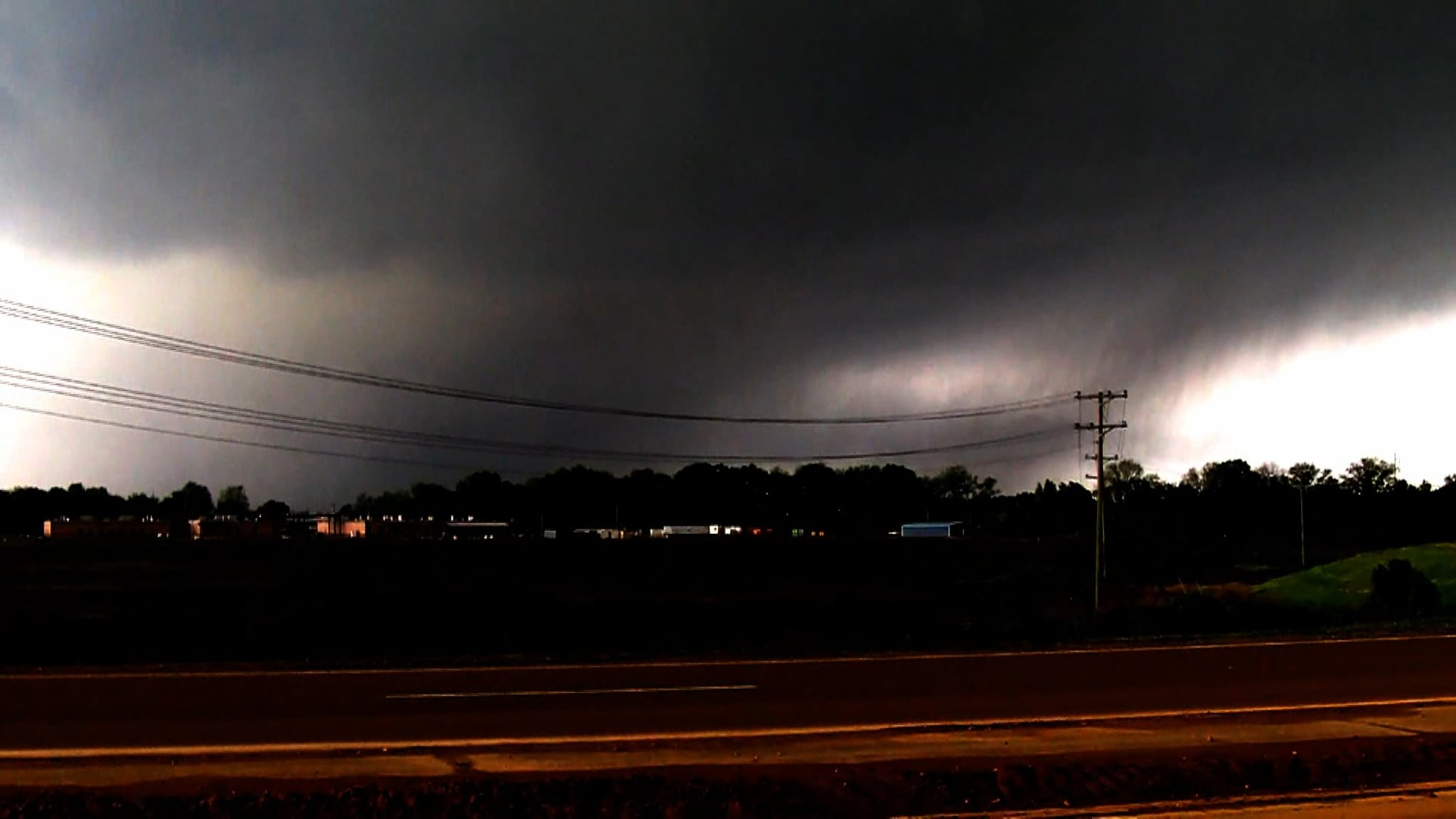
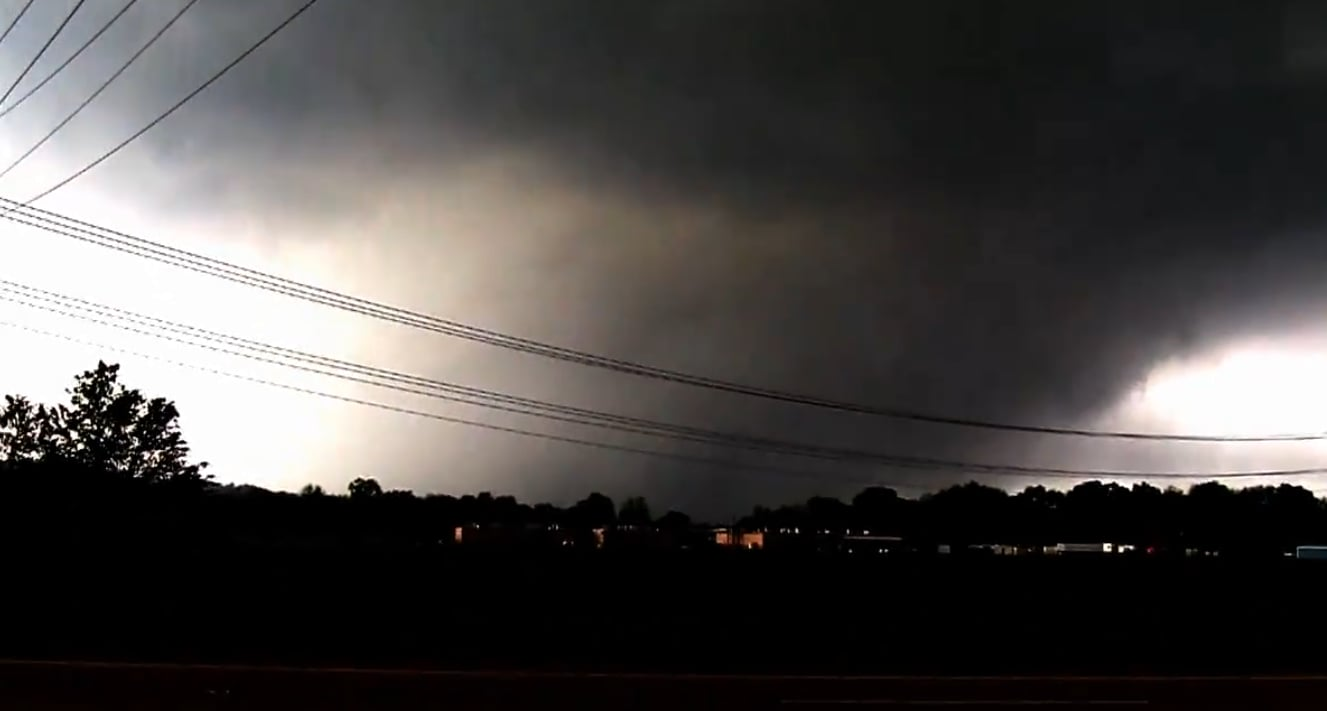
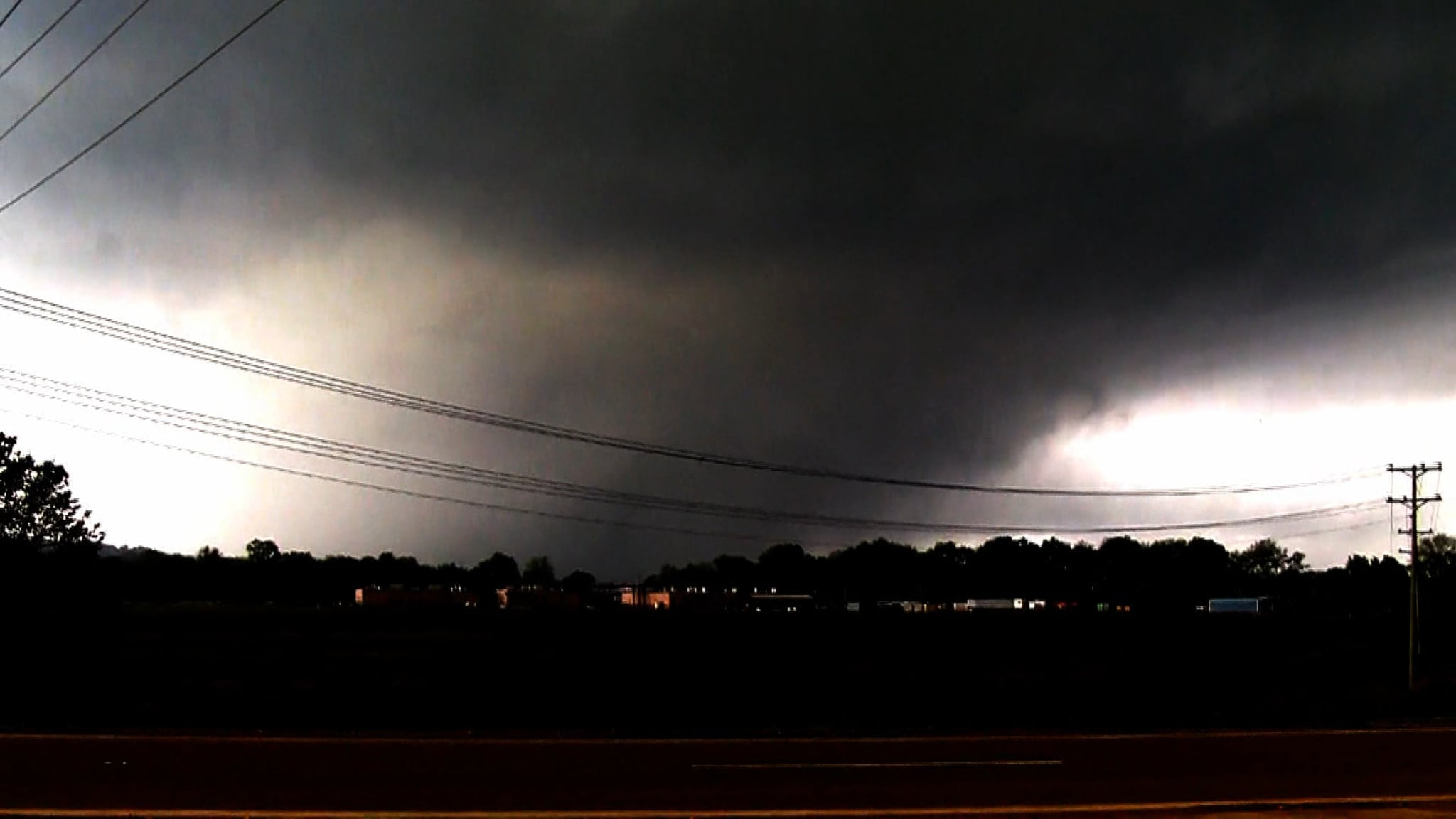
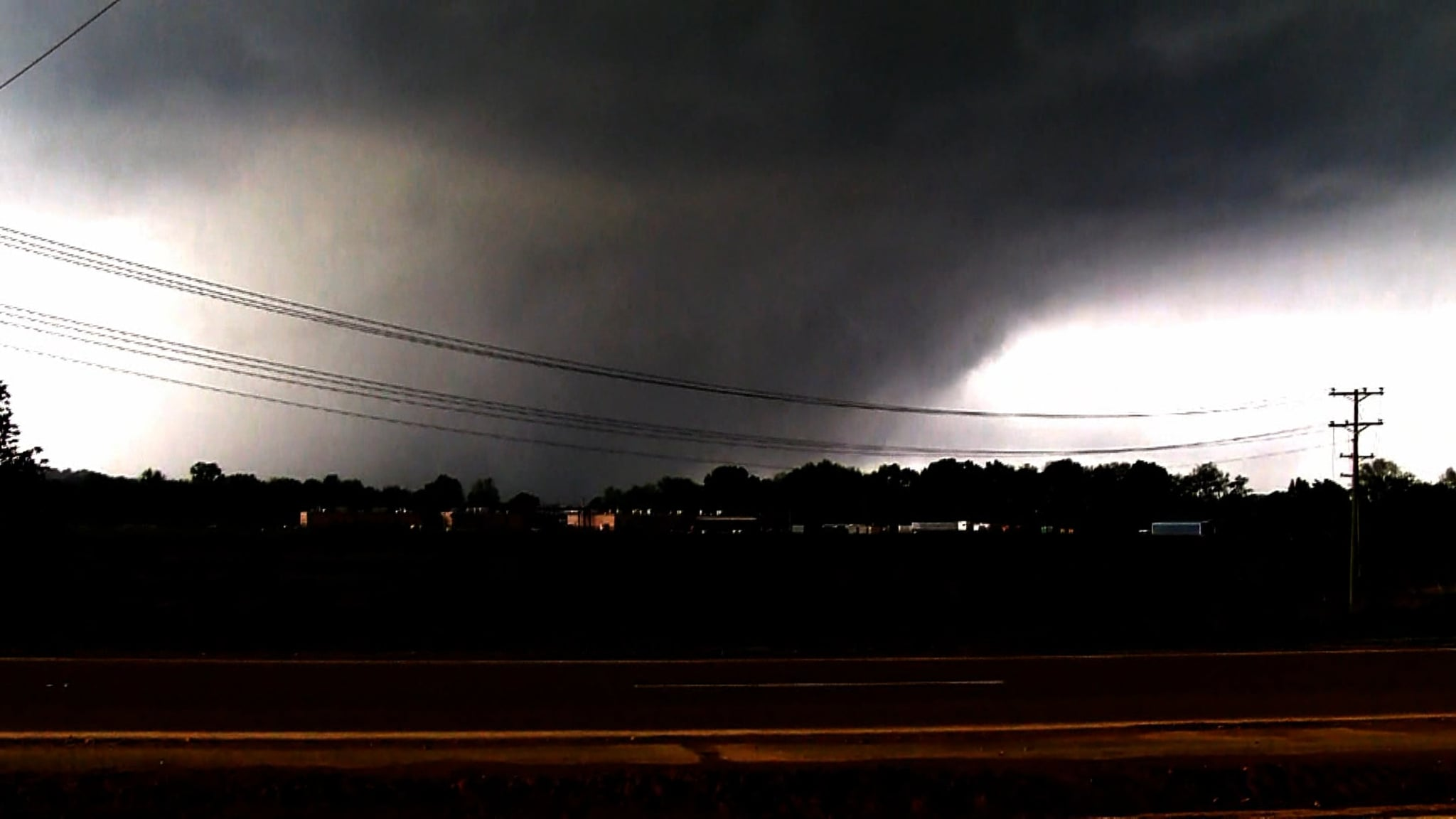
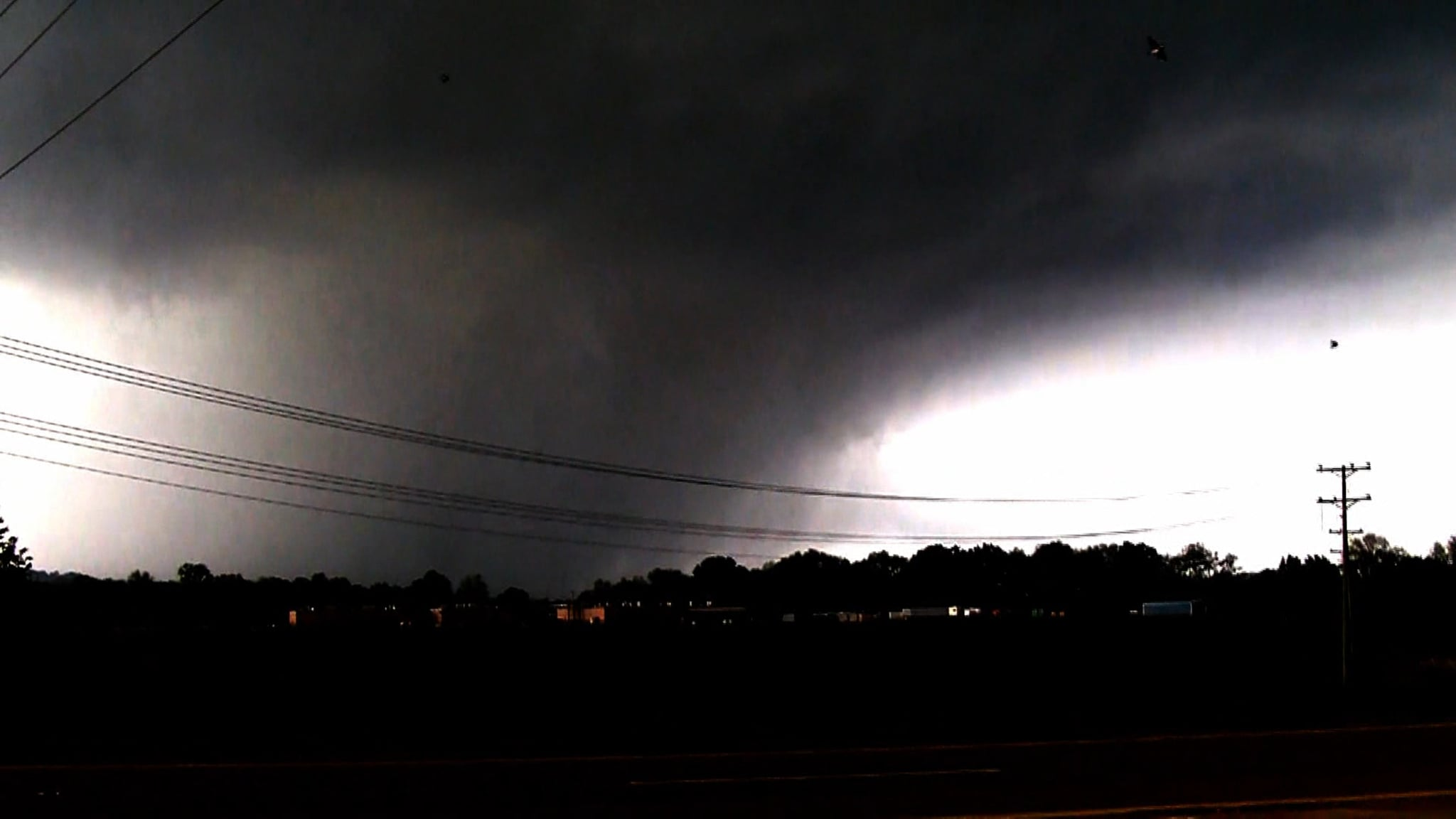
A photo series by a resident showing the tornado approaching Yazoo City, Mississippi.

== Analyses from studies ==
On August 3, 2011, researchers Samantha L. Chiu, B. F. Jewett, and R. B. Wilhelmson at the University of Illinois Urbana-Champaign analyzed the environmental and storm-scale factors that led to the Yazoo City tornado. The study utilized real data and idealized simulations through the Weather Research and Forecasting Model (WRF). The real-data simulations examined the role of mesoscale forcing, horizontal variability, and environmental changes along the storm track. The idealized simulations played a role in separating the local environmental shear and instability influences on storm intensity and stability. The real-data runs used model soundings on the inflow environment to identify favorable factors that facilitated storm growth. Mesoscale boundaries were also considered factors in the intensification and/or sustainment of tornadic supercells, along with the thermal properties of the in-situ and downstream airmass.

In 2015, a study published by the Mississippi State University and the National Weather Service office in Jackson, Mississippi, analyzed how the tornado's vegetation scar increased convective activity. Abrupt changes in vegetative coverage and latent heat fluxes were linked to increased convective activity, as shown by cloud-to-ground lightning data. The change was likely related to mesoscale circulations along thermal and moisture discontinuities, as seen on days with synoptically weak forcing. As a result, 2010 saw a higher increase in storms on days with weaker synoptics, compared to previous years, by 66%.

On July 1, 2015, two Florida State University Department of Geography researchers, Tyler Fricker and James B. Elsner, analyzed kinetic energy released by tornadoes when inflicting significant damage. The study used total kinetic energy (TKE) as a metric of destruction estimated from the fraction of the tornado path. They used a model developed by the Nuclear Regulatory Commission that connected factual data with the theory. A portion of every tornado had TKE values exceeding 62.1 gigajoules, with a quarter exceeding 383.2 gigajoules. The highest energy in the study was the Yazoo City tornado, with a TKE of 516.7 terajoules.

== Impacts ==
Overall, the tornado inflicted $409.5 million in damage. The tornado caused $36 million in total damage in Louisiana and 16 injuries. The tornado inflicted $373.5 million in total damage in Mississippi, including $144 million in Yazoo County alone. In total, 10 people were killed in Mississippi, making it the deadliest tornado of the year and in the state since 1992. At the time, it ranked as the ninth deadliest on record in the state. A total of 130 people sustained injuries across four counties. The tornado was also the worst natural disaster in Mississippi since Hurricane Katrina. Overall, the tornado inflicted $409.5 million in damage. In Yazoo City, more than 160 homes sustained moderate to major damage, and 107 homes were destroyed.

The tornado affected 556 homes, 242 manufactured homes, 33 businesses, and 18 agricultural structures throughout the track. In Madison Parish, 12 homes were destroyed, and an industrial plant was heavily damaged. Overall, 319 homes in Yazoo County were damaged, 100 residences being designated as uninhabitable. In Choctaw County, 114 homes were damaged, of which 38 were deemed uninhabitable. In Holmes County, 60 homes were damaged; in Warren County, 42, and in Attala County, 35. In Yazoo County, nine homes funded by the United States Department of Agriculture (USDA) through the Rural Development's Self-Help Housing development program were demolished.

In Yazoo and Holmes counties, fallen trees and other damage closed portions of Mississippi Highway 3, MS 14, and MS 17. The University of Mississippi Medical Center in Jackson saw 27 patients, 14 of whom were in critical condition. In Yazoo City, 17 people were transported to a hospital by ambulance, and two others were airlifted to Jackson. The King's Daughter Hospital also reported receiving injured people.

The state insurance commissioner, Mike Chaney, noted that 90% of homes in Yazoo County were insured, but 90% in Holmes County were uninsured. The insurance company, State Farm, reportedly received over 360 claims related to auto and home damage in Mississippi. The state's Insurance Department and two companies set up centers at a Sunflower Food store in Yazoo City to respond to questions and evaluate claims. A Nationwide spokesperson reported that 35 claims were placed two days after the tornado. The Mississippi Farm Bureau in Yazoo City had 390 property-loss reports.

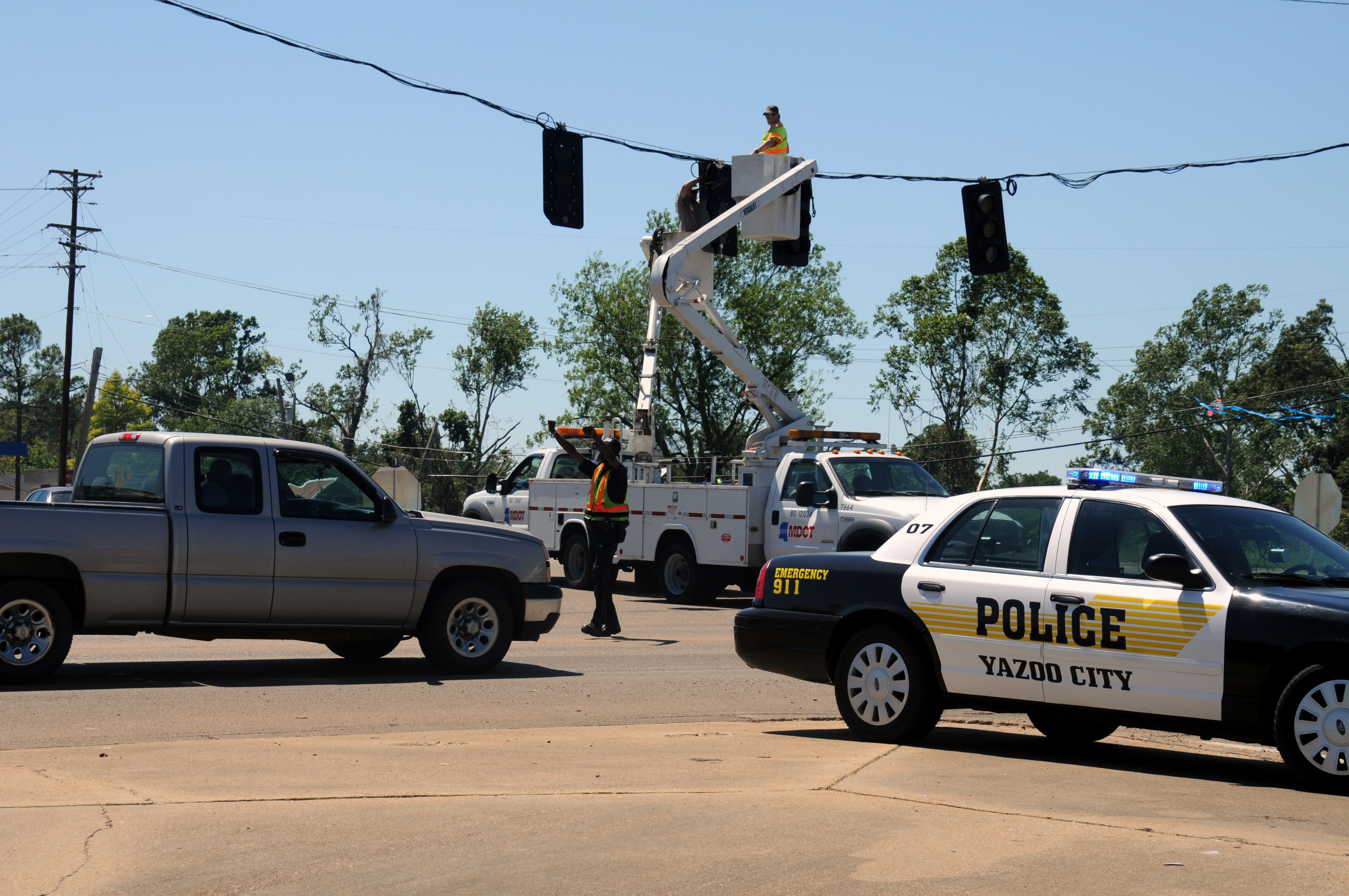
Linemen working on restoring power to the residents of the affected town

The electricity companies, Entergy and the Electric Power Association, reported that the tornado caused 19,500 customers to lose power, including 1,257 in Yazoo County, 938 in Holmes County, and 319 in Attala County. Entergy dispatched 75 linemen and support personnel to Mississippi to reinstate power to tornado-stricken areas.

Before the tornado, sirens at Eagle Bend, Warren County, failed to sound. The head of the Warren County Emergency Operations Center noted that she arrived at her office too late to activate the sirens. Nevertheless, residents of Eagle Bend were likely not aware of the sirens, since the closest one to the town was 4 miles (6.4 km) away. Warren County lacked the money to build a tornado siren near Eagle Bend. Warren County officials were working on a grant to purchase weather radios to distribute to residents. In Holmes County, where at least one tornado siren failed to sound, Durant residents recalled that the siren had not sounded in over a year. Officials in Durant stated they applied for a grant to replace the old siren, but it was rejected.

Later in 2010, two environmental scientists, D.W. Wilkinson and M.K. Crosby, observed and surveyed the forestry damage inflicted by the Yazoo City tornado. An aerial survey conducted by the Mississippi Forestry Commission estimated that the tornado affected 16,600 ha (41,000 acres) of forest across ten counties in central Mississippi. Timber damage was estimated at $19 million. The study noted that, as helpful as these estimates were in directing resources to the salvaging efforts, a better method was needed to assess forest damage events.

In July 2010, a pre-mitigation assessment team from the Federal Emergency Management Agency (FEMA) published a report on the April 23–24 tornado outbreak, specifically on the Yazoo City tornado. The report also observed and assessed the structural damage left behind and the performance of the storm shelters along the tornado's track. Of the nine residential storm shelters observed, six were occupied during the tornado, and two showed visible damage. The survey noted that storm shelters were limited in the central parts of the state, most being located in the northern and southern portions of the state. According to the Ebenezer Fire Department, residents feared using the community shelter, one of two in Holmes County, and sheltered inside the fire station. Design flaws such as inconsistent anchor usage, poor lighting, and hard-to-bar doors deterred residents from using storm shelters. The presence and locations of shelters were often unknown to residents and officials.

== Aftermath ==
=== State and federal disaster declarations ===
Mississippi Governor Haley Barbour declared a state of emergency in seven counties impacted by the tornado. A larger death toll was prevented by the timely warnings issued by the NWS and improved response systems implemented after Hurricane Katrina. The Governor of Louisiana, Bobby Jindal, declared a state of emergency for Madison Parish. Governor Barbour visited parts of Yazoo County that were devastated by the tornado. After the visit, he was interviewed by the Associated Press and stated that parts of the county experienced "utter obliteration", the destruction being reminiscent of Hurricane Katrina. Governor Barbour ordered state flags to be flown at half-staff between April 27 and April 30 during the mourning period.

On April 29, President Barack Obama declared a federal disaster for Mississippi, allocating federal aid to support state and local recovery efforts in the affected locations. Federal funding was provided to people in Attala, Choctaw, Holmes, Warren, and Yazoo counties. Federal funding became available to state and local governments and specific private nonprofit organizations in Yazoo and Choctaw counties for debris removal. The funding also allowed the state 72 hours to choose emergency protective measures.

FEMA granted nearly $3.3 million in individual assistance, and 849 residents applied for aid. The Small Business Administration made nearly $2.4 million in loans, mostly for home repairs. The Farm Service Agency (FSA) made emergency assistance available for eligible farmers and producers. The state executive director stated that the Emergency Conservation Program (ECP) provided funding to affected farmers and producers. The agency assisted with debris removal on farm fields and restored fencing, with cost-share assistance up to 75%. Multiple FSA offices were cleared to implement the program, including in Yazoo, Attala, Choctaw, Holmes, and Oktibbeha counties.

=== State governmental response ===
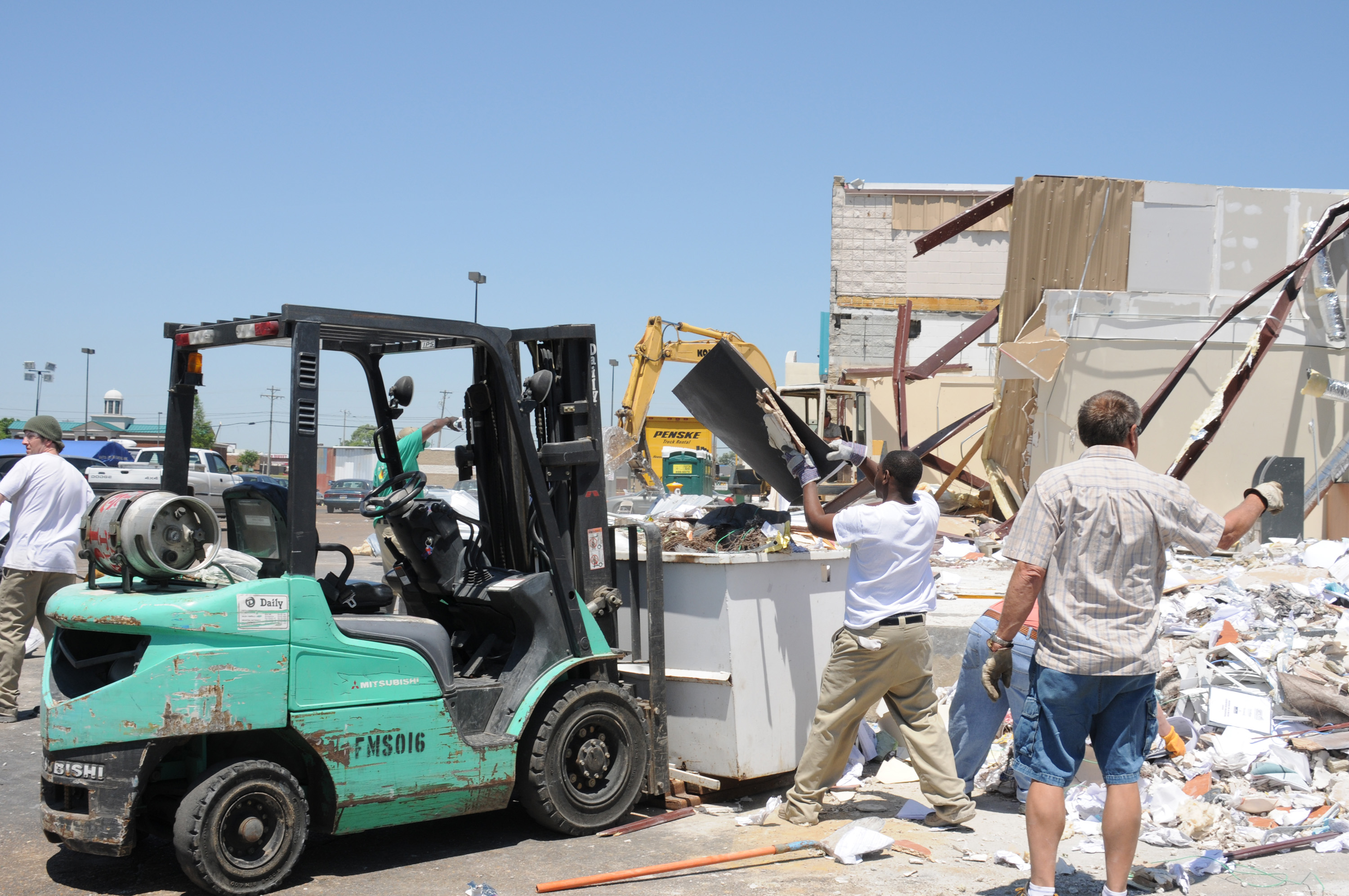
Clean up efforts at a destroyed supermarket in Yazoo City on April 29

Rescuers initially struggled to reach Yazoo County due to geographic challenges. The county was on hilly terrain that rose sharply and ran along the Mississippi Delta. Some rescuers used off-road vehicles to reach victims. Helicopters flew overhead to assess damage as rapid response teams searched for victims. The American Medical Response continued its operations in other parts of Mississippi, deploying ambulances to affected areas, according to a company spokesman. The Rankin County Emergency Management Agency sent a bus that was converted into a multi-patient ambulance. The American Medical Response of Central Mississippi opened a triage center in Yazoo City, taking patients in trucks as debris made travel difficult. In total, 11 ambulances were sent to the city, and four people were transported to different hospitals. The Mississippi National Guard deployed 80 soldiers, and another 40 Highway Patrol officers were posted across affected areas, with other law enforcement officers assisting. The state established a command post along Highway 49 in Yazoo City. The state also activated a rapid-response team from Hattiesburg, consisting of 25 members skilled in search-and-rescue operations. State officials opened a donation center at the Mississippi State Fair to receive bottled water and imperishable food for the relief effort.

The Mississippi Commission for Volunteer Service (MCVS) established an emergency response center in Yazoo City to evaluate the damage. Volunteer response centers were also established in Attala, Holmes, and Choctaw counties. MCVS staff members expanded volunteer coordination operations in Attala County. MCVS partnered with several faith-based and charity organizations assisting disaster response efforts and accessed MCVS' network of national service partners. MCVS registered volunteers and accepted requests for assistance from residents before being allowed into disaster zones. Between April 24 and May 25, 1,067 volunteers registered and deployed in Yazoo County. In Holmes County, 163 volunteers did so, as did 278 in Choctaw and Attala counties. Overall, the volunteers completed thousands of hours.

The Mississippi Emergency Management Agency (MEMA) offered housing to victims who lost their homes, using cottages originally built for Hurricane Katrina victims. The cottages were available for victims in all the affected counties. The Delta unit of AmeriCorps' National Civilian Community Corps was dispatched to Yazoo City to aid in the relief efforts. The regional director surveyed and assessed damage in the city, and the mission began at the organization's campus in Vicksburg. The Mississippi Department of Mental Health and Warren-Yazoo Mental Health Service collaborated to organize a stress management seminar at Yazoo County High School. The event was intended to help traumatized victims and first responders. Despite the advertisement, no victims or first responders came to the mental health seminar.

==== United States Department of Agriculture ====
The State Director for Mississippi Rural Development visited Yazoo City an hour after the tornado passed through. Yazoo City mayor MacArthur Straughter joined alongside the Director, assembling a full-court press and using resources at USDA Rural Development to aid damaged areas and affected residents. USDA Multi-Family Housing Program staff coordinated a rapid response to open up vacant units for affected families. The State Director for Mississippi's Rural Development program and other USDA officials, with assistance from local municipal and community leaders, helped rebuild a home significantly damaged by the tornado. The effort was part of USDA's designated National Homeownership Month in June. The event also highlighted the Self-Help Housing program, which helped people and families build their own homes.

=== Local and organizations responses ===
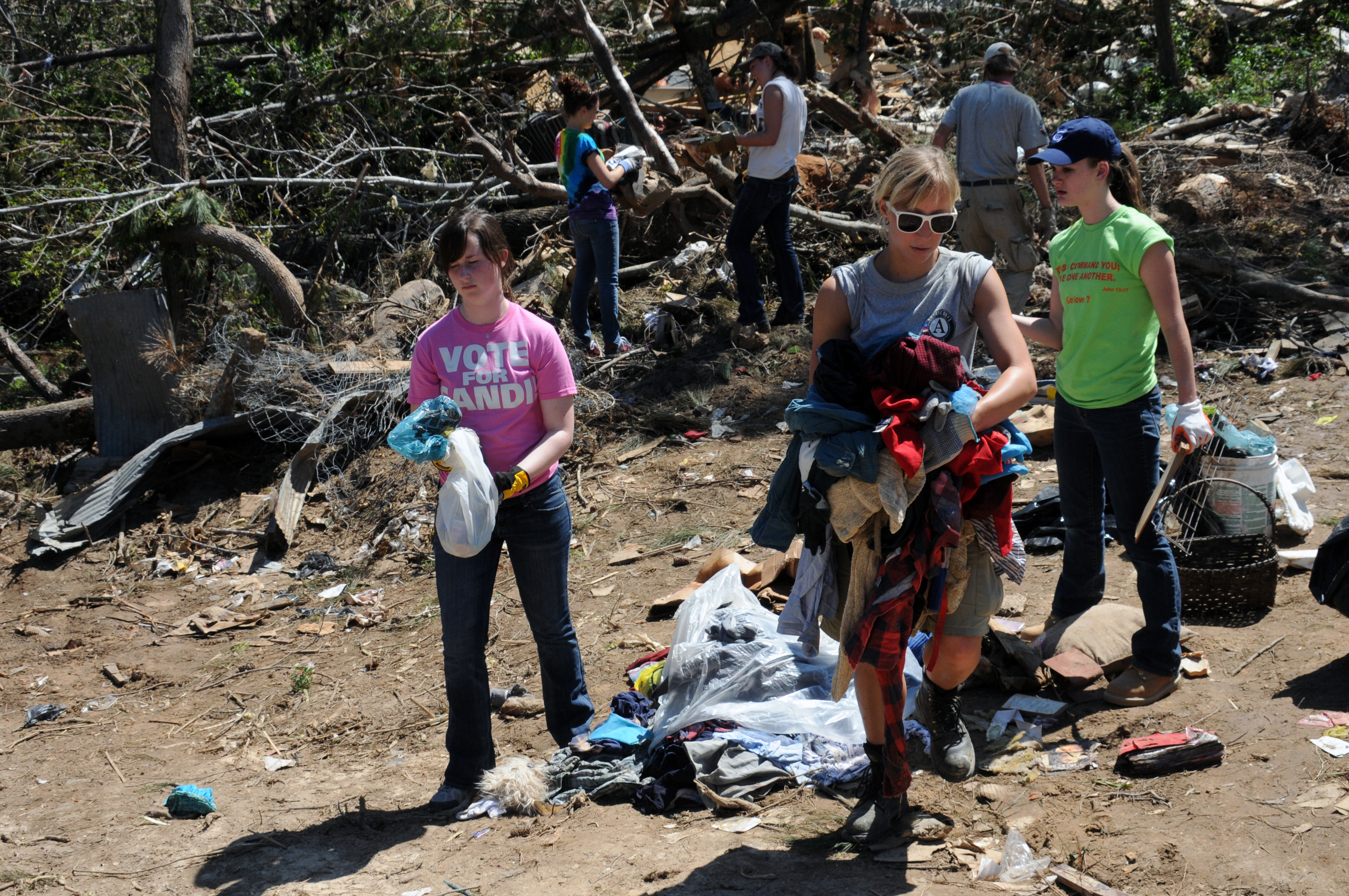
High school volunteers from Michigan assisting in the cleanup effort near Weir

Over the next couple of days, rescue efforts spread into rural areas. The federal government and the American Red Cross dispatched rescue teams, distributed tarps, meals, and water to victims. Officials requested volunteers to help coordinate debris removal. From Oakwood University in Huntsville, 20 student volunteers from the National Association for the Prevention of Starvation arrived in Yazoo City. The student volunteers used chainsaws to cut through fallen trees, hauling off debris. The L.T. Community Center in Yazoo City opened as a shelter for victims, with meals provided by the American Red Cross.

Over the weekend, 14 deputy fire marshals were deployed to disaster zones to monitor for looters, though minor cases of looting in Holmes County occurred. In Hinds County, the sheriff's department accepted imperishable food, water bottles, clothing, beds, and other essentials. The supplies were loaded onto a semi-truck sent out to assist relief efforts. The sheriff's department deployed two dozen deputies and 100 inmates to help clear debris in Yazoo County following the tornado. On April 26, 15 Firefighters from Columbus Fire Department's Task Force Two team dispatched the search and rescue team to Yazoo and Choctaw counties. The mission was to determine the damage to residences and account for all residents in the area.

By April 28, debris on Old Benton Road, a hard-hit area in Yazoo County, was cleared. Local construction company owner Paul Parker reported an overwhelming workload and concerns about storms forecast for the next week. The Houston Astros player Roy Oswalt traveled several hours to Weir to check up on his parents, whose home was partially destroyed by the tornado. Oswalt spent the weekend using heavy machinery to clear debris from his parents' and neighbors' homes.

Customers from Yazoo and Holmes counties purchased essentials such as generators and lumber at a Lowe's store in Madison. An ACE Hardware store in Yazoo City remained operational to assist customers. The first responders and customers bought tarps, generators, batteries, chainsaws, and duct tape. Store supplies dwindled due to demand, though fresh supplies arrived by truck from Mobile. In Holmes County, items including plywood, roofing shingles, windows, and pipes quickly sold out at the Lexington Home Center hardware store.

Housing Assistance Council loaned $10,000 to the Esther Stewart Buford Foundation for new construction equipment. The foundation provided emergency shelter, clothing, and essential supplies to tornado victims; state, county, and local officials joined in the effort to help residents. The local volunteer group, Operation Ukraine, and other volunteers traveled to Yazoo City. They brought along a truck loaded with supplies and essentials, including six pallets of bottled water and first-aid supplies. The truck drove to the Broadway Church of Christ, which served as the official distribution site for the disaster area. A building supplies store, New Home Building Stores in Columbus, assisted Operation Ukraine by purchasing roofing plastic and supplies to cover roofs of damaged homes.

==== Faith-based groups ====
At the Ribeye's Steakhouse in Yazoo City, The Salvation Army and the American Red Cross served 4,500 hot meals for affected residents in mobile feeding units. The organization gave 200 blue tarps to several homes in Yazoo and Holmes counties. On June 17, 15 congregations based in St. Louis spent ten days to collectively raise $9,000 for Yazoo County Red Cross.

The Lutheran Episcopal Service in Mississippi (LESM) immediately began assisting in the relief efforts. The LESM Director of Disaster Preparedness and Response stated that the coordinated effort helped organize and place volunteers where they were needed. Mississippi Voluntary Organizations Active in Disaster was also holding conference calls with other member organizations to collaborate and coordinate response efforts. LESM sent an assessment and emergency cleanup team to tornado-damaged areas. St. Mary's Episcopal Church initiated relief in Holmes County, serving meals in the Ebenezer area to victims and relief workers. The Lutheran Disaster Response issued a $10,000 emergency grant to LESM to use in the early days of the relief effort.

God's Pit Crew, a Virginia disaster response group, launched a mass distribution of goods to victims in Yazoo and several other affected counties. The group distributed 300,000 lb (140,000 kg) of essentials over five days, including water, tarps, and imperishable foods. Other distribution centers were established as well. The Central Mississippi chapter opened a shelter with supplies as well as emergency response vehicles, and other places opened up as shelters. The Yazoo City Church of Christ administered 184,000 water bottles over the span of a couple of days. Another church from Jackson and churches from other states, including Arkansas and Kentucky, arrived to aid the recovery effort.

In Louisiana, the Willow Bayou and several other Baptist churches rallied to help. The Transylvania Baptist Church brought fixings to the William Bayou Church and provided dinner to residents, rescue workers, and other guests who showed up. The American Red Cross provided essentials, including water and comfort kits. The Madison Parish Sheriff's Department gave residents free gasoline and generators. Auto parts stores Western Auto and Aaron's Rental donated a few deep-freezers to store food.

==== Storm Chasers ====
The documentary television series Storm Chasers, in its season 4 episode "Why We Chase", depicted the tornado and its aftermath. In the episode, storm chaser and meteorologist Reed Timmer and his chase partners, Joel Taylor and Chris Chittick, documented the tornado as it entered town. Immediately after the tornado, the chasers rescued trapped people and contacted medics.

=== Recovery ===
After the tornado, the Complex Chemical plant pumped spilled materials into temporary tanks for disposal. Contractors were hired, and heavy equipment was rented to remove debris across the site. Complex leased trailers as temporary office spaces. As production was outsourced in several areas, large containers temporarily warehoused raw materials and products. One of the 13 large generators the Complex rented out powered key areas of the plant, like the blending and distillation units. By June 14, all 11 processing units at the Complex plant were operating at 90% capacity and productivity, though debris was still evident on the property. Afterward, the plant installed a separate, larger office building, a large warehouse, and a new electrical system. It also built a large steel enclosure to protect the distillation and oil-blending units, which was rebuilt to include a truck loading area.

At Eagle Lake, residents planning to rebuild their homes are now required to build them on stilts 18 inches (46 centimetres) off the ground, in line with FEMA directives for counties lacking National Flood Insurance Program policies in their local laws. This led to the new construction guidelines implemented in Warren County's flood ordinance. The said counties were included in Special Flood Hazard Areas, regions FEMA considers susceptible to 100-year inundations. In town, 41 residents received housing, and the Eagle Lake Volunteer Fire Department opened a disaster recovery center to assist with unemployment and affected businesses. Along MS 465, a debris collection site opened next to a cotton gin business that was there until June 30.

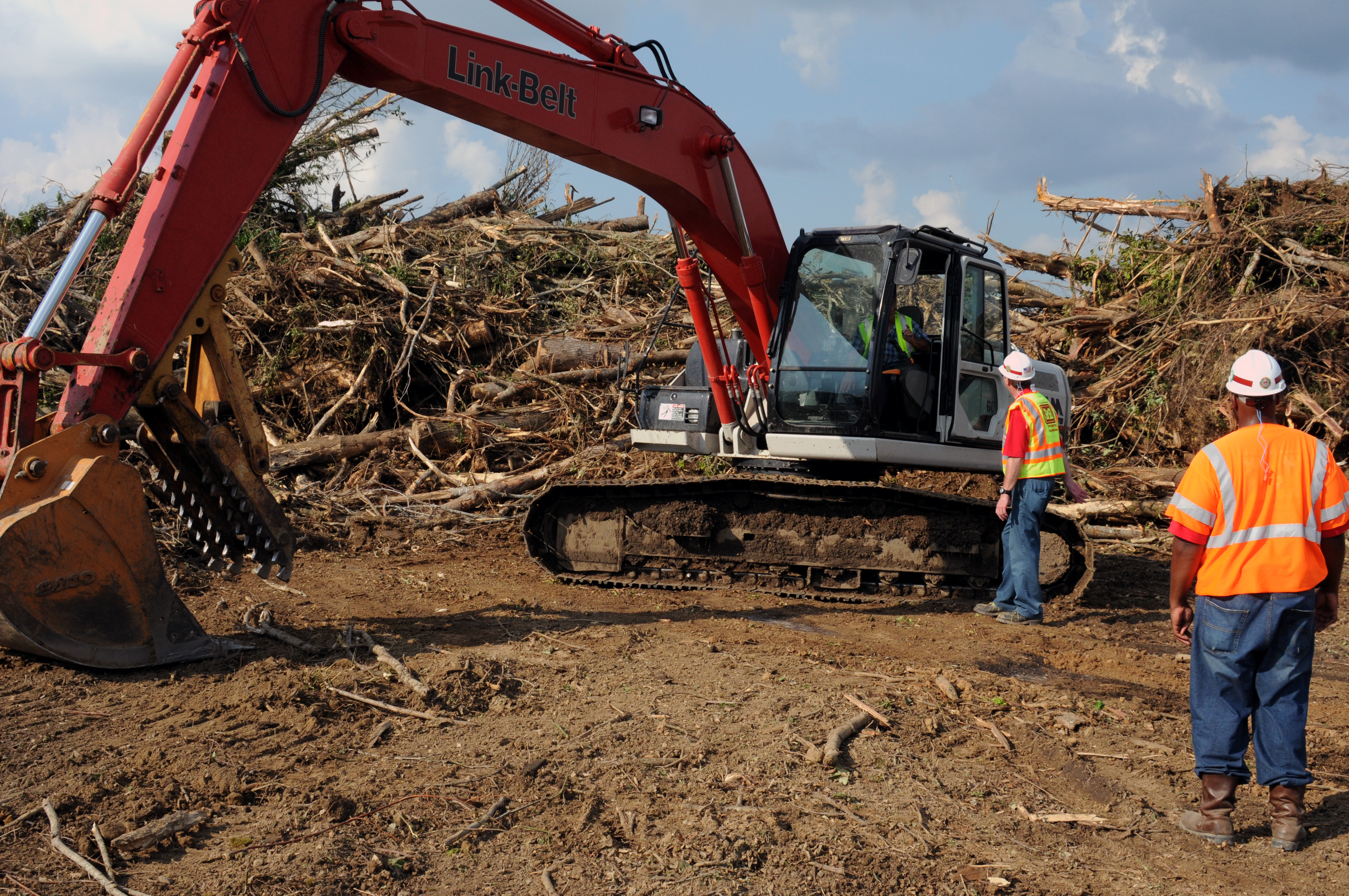
The Army Corps of Engineers assisting with the debris removal at a debris dump site

By May 20, large debris piles accumulated during the cleanup effort in Yazoo and Choctaw counties were being hauled away. Debris piles at a landfill northwest of Yazoo City were being taken and incinerated in an operation overseen by the United States Army Corps of Engineers (USACE). Three months after the tornado, according to the USACE, almost 69.1 million tons of debris were removed across five counties. Contractors installed new power poles, and volunteers helped repair homes. In Choctaw County, 15 families stayed in FEMA trailer homes at a recreational vehicle park, and many others moved into FEMA cottage homes. About 22 members of the Saint Pius X youth ministry disaster relief team helped in rebuilding homes in Yazoo City.

A year after the tornado, 90% of damaged homes in Yazoo City were repaired, and many businesses, like the Ribeye Steakhouse and Just My Style spa, reopened soon after. In July 2011, a community preparedness program, StormReady, designated Yazoo County as such, given its efforts in improve severe weather readiness following the previous year's tornadoes. The county received grants to install new sirens in multiple locations. A local weather radio program also received funding to distribute weather radios to schools, businesses, and homes.

On November 21, 2011, the Hillcrest Baptist Church was rebuilt debt-free due to donations and held a dedication ceremony for the revival. Its estimated reconstruction cost was $1.5 million.

In March 2017, embers from a house fire landed in a wooded area, sparking a fast-moving wildfire that scorched 121 acres (49 ha) of forest, with firefighters from multiple agencies extinguishing the fire in 14 hours. Piles of uncleared timber debris from the tornado fueled the fire, and rough terrain also slowed efforts to put out the flames.

== Later tornado ==
On November 29, seven months after the tornado, another significant EF2 tornado struck downtown Yazoo City, with estimated wind speeds of 115 mph (185 km/h). Several buildings were damaged, most being unroofed and one having parts of its exterior walls collapse. In the downtown area, windows were shattered, and siding was ripped off a building. Afterward, the tornado tore off roofs from homes and businesses, snapped power poles, and uprooted several trees before dissipating northeast of Yazoo City. No casualties were reported, and the tornado caused $1.1 million in damage. Governor Haley Barbour and Lieutenant Governor Phil Bryant assessed damage in Yazoo City, where 24 businesses were damaged. Bryant stated afterward, "I think what you've got here is storm fatigue. It's very frightening to people."

== See also ==
- Weather of 2010
- List of tornado emergencies
- List of F4 and EF4 tornadoes (2010–2019)
- List of deadliest tornadoes in the Americas
- 2023 Rolling Fork tornado – Another deadly EF4 tornado that occurred in the same region
