= Ferson =

Ferson is a surname. Notable people with the surname include:

- Alex Ferson (1866–1957), American baseball player
- Ginny Ferson (born 1963), British diplomat
- Scott Ferson, American political consultant
- Scott Ferson (professor), American academic

== See also ==
- Dimon McFerson, American chief executive
