= Nationwide Bank =

Nationwide Bank may refer to:

- Nationwide Mutual Insurance Company
- Nationwide Building Society
