= Hershey Entertainment Complex =

Sports venue in Derry Township, Pennsylvania

Coordinates: 40.283602°N 76.668402°W

The Hershey Entertainment Complex is a multi acre facility in Derry Township, Pennsylvania. It houses Hersheypark, Hersheypark Stadium, Star Pavilion, Hersheypark Arena, Giant Center, and the former Parkview Golf Course.

The owner of the complex and all of the facilities (excluding the Giant Center - see below) is the Hershey Entertainment and Resorts Company (HE&R), based at 300 Park Boulevard in Hershey, Pennsylvania.

== Hersheypark ==
The premier attraction at the complex is Hersheypark. Hersheypark is a multi acre amusement park featuring 14 roller coasters and many water rides (see The Boardwalk at Hersheypark - below.) Many kiddie and family rides are also included with the parks flat admission rate. Hersheypark is known as the country's Cleanest and Greenest Park.

== Hersheypark Stadium ==
The Hersheypark Stadium is a multi-seat dual-side concrete structure located in the middle of the complex. It seats 15,000 for football and soccer events, and over 30,000 for concerts. It is home to the Summer Concert Series, the Big 33 Football Classic, PIAA Football and Soccer Championships and other local uses by the local area and by HE&R. On August 12, 2009, Blink-182, Panic! At the Disco, and Fall Out Boy performed here for a stop on Blink-182's summer reunion tour.

== The Star Pavilion ==
The Star Pavilion at Hersheypark Stadium is located at the north end of Hersheypark Stadium (see above). It only hosts small concerts (up to 7,500) on both reserved seating and General Admission (on the Grass/Hill).

== Hersheypark Arena ==
Hersheypark Arena is one of the oldest standing ice rinks left standing in the United States today. Built in 1939 for the Hershey Bears hockey team, it has aged over the years and forced the company to build the Giant Center at the other end (west end) of the complex. The arena used to host ice hockey games, the Ringling Brothers Barnum and Bailey Circus, WWE Wrestling and small concerts (seating capacity is about 7,000.) Today it is used for local hockey team practice, as a small concert venue, for youth hockey games, public skating, and as a meeting place for companies. This was where Wilt Chamberlain scored 100 points in a single NBA game.

== Giant Center ==
The Giant Center, located at 950 W. Hersheypark Drive, is the premier enclosed arena in central Pennsylvania. Built in 2002 as a replacement for the historic Hersheypark Arena, which was aging rapidly and did not have a large enough capacity for events, the GIANT Center is the largest arena in South Central Pennsylvania. The GIANT Center is owned by The Township of Derry.

== Emergency Preparedness ==
In March 2008 the Hershey Entertainment Complex was certified as StormReady by the National Weather Service. This is awarded to communities and organizations/companies that are prepared for Severe Weather. The Hershey Entertainment Complex was certified based on their emergency action procedures, emergency evacuation plans and evacuation shelter(s) capability. The complex contains an extensive system of CCTV Security Cameras, trained security personal and extensive weather spotting and detecting systems.
