= Blue Lab =

Campaign consulting company

The Blue Lab
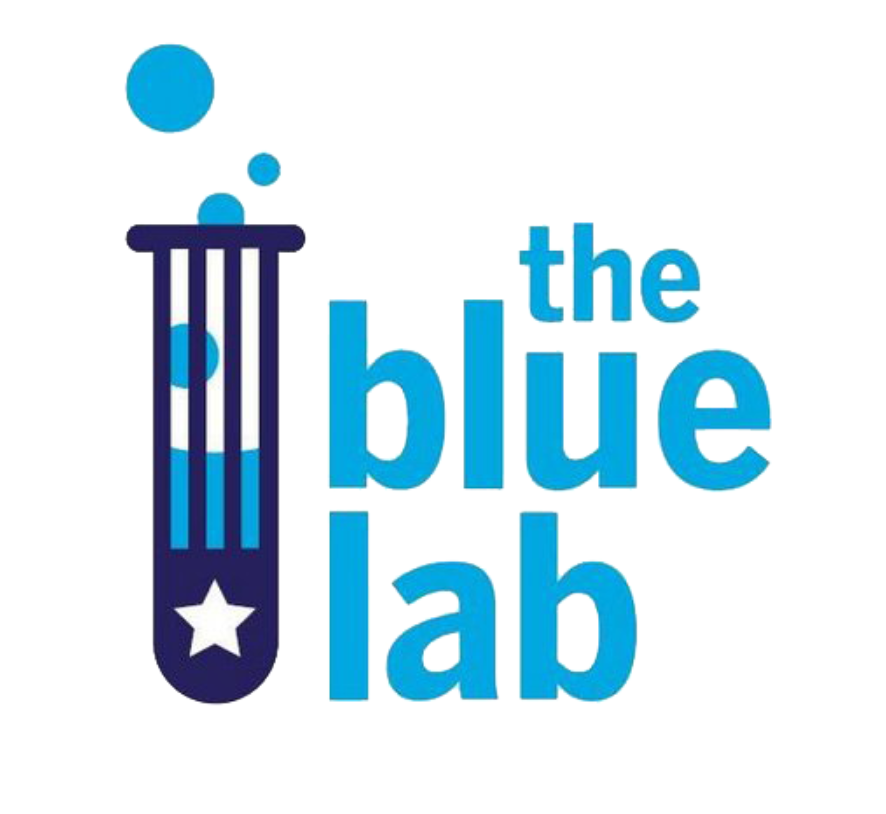
- Founded: 2012
- Founder: Scott Ferson, Sean Sinclair
- Location: Boston, MA
- Region served: United States
- Key people: Casey Atkins, Executive Director Tim DeLouchrey, Director of Operations
- Website: TheBlueLab.org

The Blue Lab is a political incubator and campaign consulting firm in Boston, Massachusetts, USA. The Blue Lab operates as the political arm of Liberty Square Group, a strategic communications firm that handles corporate public relations and lobbying.

== History ==
The Blue Lab was founded in 2012 by Scott Ferson, former press secretary for Senator Edward M. Kennedy, and Sean Sinclair, former campaign manager for Harry Reid. The two founded the firm after collaborating on a campaign video for Salem, MA Mayor Kim Driscoll. The current Executive Director, Casey Atkins, has served as an advisor to many federal, state, and local campaigns and has been an active volunteer with a number of advocacy causes and non-profit groups. She is joined by Tim DeLouchrey, the Director of Operations at the Blue Lab, who has experience interning for former Congresswoman Niki Tsongas and Congresswoman Lori Trahan.

The Blue Lab aims to lower the barrier of entry for first-time, minority, and female candidates identifying with the Democratic Party. It was founded in opposition to the Citizens United ruling, which altered campaign finance laws and favors candidates with higher fundraising ability as well as party support and PACs. The Blue Lab provides permanent campaign infrastructure for progressive candidates across Massachusetts and the United States, with a specific focus on local and state elections as a way to create a Democratic bench. In 2019, The Blue Lab partnered with The Welcome Party to conduct independent voter engagement in the early presidential primary states of New Hampshire and South Carolina.

The Blue Lab has successfully assisted on the campaigns of Congressman Seth Moulton, Congressman Stephen F. Lynch, Middlesex County District Attorney Marian Ryan, 5th District Governor’s Councilor Eileen Duff, 3rd District Essex State Representative Andy Vargas, 18th Essex State Representative Tram Nguyen, former 1st Middlesex District State Senator Eileen Donoghue, former 14th Middlesex State Representative Cory Atkins, Cambridge Mayor Sumbul Siddiqui, District 1 Boston City Councilor Lydia Edwards, Ward 1 Somerville Alderman Matt McLaughlin, Ward 2 Somerville Alderman J.T Scott, and Somerville Alderman At-Large Stephanie Hirsch, among others.

The Blue Lab’s current clients include Eileen Duff for 5th District Governor’s Council, Tram Nguyen for 18th Essex State Representative, Meg Wheeler for Plymouth and Norfolk District State Senate, Maribeth Cusick for Concord School Committee, Harvard Forward for the election of five candidates to the Harvard Board of Overseers, and Ana Victoria Morales for the Mayor of Lawrence.
