= Dimon McFerson =

Business executive

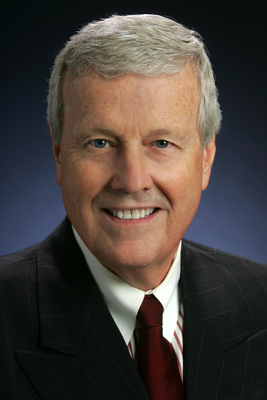
- Born: Dimon Richard McFerson
- Education: Public Administration (USC); Business Education (UCLA)
- Alma mater: USC (M.P.A.); UCLA (B.A.)
- Known for: CEO of Nationwide Mutual Insurance Company 1992-2000
- Board member of: Ohio State University Board of Trustees

Dimon McFerson is an American business executive and former CEO of Nationwide Mutual Insurance Company where he served in the capacity from 1992 to 2000.

== Early life and education ==
McFerson was born Dimon Richard McFerson and grew up in Southern California, using his middle name Richard for much of his life. His father was a truck driver and his mother a school teacher. He attended the University of California, Los Angeles where he graduated with a degree in business education. Instead of going into teaching, he decided to pursue a career within business itself. He also received a master's degree in Public Administration from USC.

== Career ==
McFerson began his career as a management trainee for a drugstore chain in California. He also spent time in the army before returning to night school and passing his CPA exam. He began working for Ernst & Young where his first audit was for an insurance company, leading to him becoming the "insurance guy" in the audit industry. He went on to work for Surety Life and later New England Life Insurance prior to beginning his career at Nationwide.

McFerson began his career with Nationwide Mutual Insurance Company in 1979 as Vice President of Internal Audits. He went through five promotions over 20 years with Nationwide. McFerson retired from Nationwide in 2000, with former Bank One executive W.G. Jurgensen taking over the position. In 2000 he was also elected to the board of trustees for The Ohio State University.
