= Scott Ferson =

American political consultant (born 1961)

Scott Melbourne Ferson
- Born: December 8, 1961 (age 64); Medford, Massachusetts
- Education: The George Washington University, UMass Dartmouth
- Occupation: President of the Liberty Square Group
- Political party: Democratic

Scott Melbourne Ferson is a public relations executive and a Democratic Party strategist from Massachusetts. He has served as a press secretary for Senator Edward M. Kennedy, communications director for Congressman Stephen Lynch, and senior advisor during Congressman Seth Moulton's 2014 campaign. His firm, the Liberty Square Group, is a strategic communications firm representing corporate, nonprofit, and through its political division, the Blue Lab, political clients.

== Early life and education ==
Ferson was born in Medford, Massachusetts and raised in Burlington. He attended Southeastern Massachusetts University (now the University of Massachusetts Dartmouth) where he earned a bachelor's degree in Political Science. While he was a student, Ferson was introduced to political organizing on the John B. Anderson presidential campaign in 1980 as the Burlington, Massachusetts coordinator. After graduating, he worked for the newly elected Congressman Chester G. Atkins of the 5th district in Massachusetts, focusing on economic development issues in Lawrence and Lowell.

Ferson later earned a master's degree in Strategic Public Relations from George Washington University.

== Early career ==
In 1987 he left Atkins' office for Congressman Richard Gephardt's campaign for president. He then joined Senator Edward M. Kennedy's staff, working in his Boston office as his press secretary and his Massachusetts issues director from 1990 to 1995, including Kennedy's 1994 re-election campaign against Mitt Romney.

Ferson next began a career in the private sector, handling a broad range of issues including the successful effort of the Church of Jesus Christ of Latter-day Saints to build a temple in Belmont and the launch of the Fishing Health Care Partnership.

== The Liberty Square Group ==
In 1999, as national firms acquired smaller companies, Ferson started his own business, the Liberty Square Group. As president, Ferson represents New England nonprofit and corporate interests and directs regional political campaigns. Today, the Liberty Square Group is a full service public affairs firm with a dozen associates, handling government affairs, public relations, press issues, and government marketing on local, state, and federal levels.

For decades, Kennedy served as the most visible and powerful conduit between Boston and Washington, a constant presence on shuttle flights. Now a shadow contingent of former aides travels the pathway their boss once took. Few among the Kennedy alumni have traveled this nexus of power between two capitals more often and more successfully than Scott Ferson as he focuses on securing an array of benefits for Massachusetts — and his clients.

— Matt Viser, Boston Globe

Ferson has managed press for the LDS Church, for Stephen Lynch's election to the US Congress, and for Tim Murray's run for Lieutenant Governor of Massachusetts. He has offered communications counsel to groups including the Mashpee Wompanoag Tribe and the Special Olympics International Games.

In 2011, Ferson and Sean Sinclair, a former campaign manager for Senator Harry Reid, founded the Blue Lab, an incubator for Democratic campaigns and a comprehensive campaign resource for candidates. Based on the startup model, the consultants and interns seek to cut costs for clients through shared space and lateral input.

In 2014, he was senior adviser and general consultant for Seth Moulton in his upset win for Massachusetts's 6th congressional district, cited by Roll Call as one of the 10 best run congressional campaigns of 2014.

In 2018, Ferson was contracted by Columbia Gas to manage the media in the aftermath of the Merrimack Valley gas explosions.

In 2020, Ferson was a key strategy and communications advisor to Senator Ed Markey during the Senator's historic primary victory against Congressman Joe Kennedy III.

== Publications ==
Ferson’s book, How the Democrats Lost America: Making Sense of the 2024 Election and the Future of American Politics, will be published by Turner Publishing Company in April 2026.

== Teaching ==
In 2013, Ferson started working as an adjunct professor at Stonehill College.

== Personal life ==
Scott Ferson is a resident of Belmont, Massachusetts, where he formerly served as the president of The First Church in Belmont Unitarian Universalist, and as president of the Belmont Library Foundation. He currently sits on the board of Sail Boston.
