= Emergency Conservation Program =

The Emergency Conservation Program (ECP) is a program administered by the Farm Service Agency to help farmers to rehabilitate farmland damaged by natural disasters by sharing in the cost of rehabilitation. It is almost always funded in supplemental appropriations that provide federal assistance to deal with a natural disaster.
