= Mississippi Forestry Commission =

Mississippi state government agency

- Formation: 1926
- Type: State Agency
- Purpose: forest resource management, wildfire suppression
- Headquarters: 3139 Highway 468 West, Pearl, Mississippi
- Region served: Mississippi
- State Forester: Russell Bozeman
- Staff: 250-300
- Website: Mississippi Forestry Commission

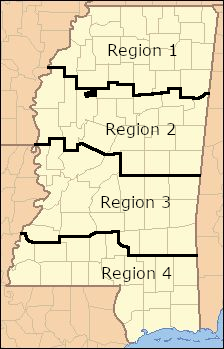
Mississippi Forestry Commission Regions

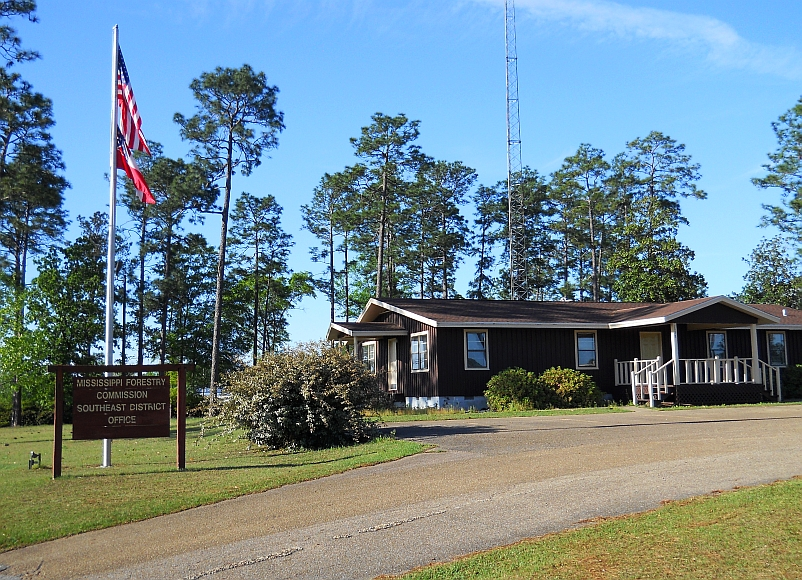
Former MFC Southeast District Office in Wiggins, Mississippi (closed in 2019)

The Mississippi Forestry Commission (MFC) is a State Agency in Mississippi with headquarters in Pearl. The Forestry Commission was authorized to:

prevent, control, and extinguish forest fires; enforce laws pertaining to the protection of forests and woodlands in the state; and encourage forest and tree planting for the production of a wood crop and other beneficial purposes.

The agency was created in 1926.

== Mission ==
The mission of the Mississippi Forestry Commission is:

... to provide active leadership in forest protection, forest management, forest inventory and effective forest information distribution necessary for Mississippi's sustainable forest-based economy.

== Program areas ==
The Mississippi Forestry Commission has two major program areas:

- Forest Protection and Information

This program area is concerned with protection of the state's forestlands from wildfire, as well as, the detection, evaluation, and control of forest pests that include insects, diseases, and invasive plants.

- Mississippi Institute for Forest Inventory and Forest Management

This program area provides an assessment of statewide forest resources using geographic information systems to estimate forest removals, regeneration, and development of forest cover. The agency manages two state forests (Kurtz and Camden) and the state's forested 16th Section School Trust Lands.

== Organizational structure ==
There is a ten-member Board of Commissioners appointed by the Governor of Mississippi.

The agency is under the direction of a State Forester with five Departments (Business Support, Forest Information, Forest Management, Forest Protection, and Forest Health).

There are four administrative regions in Mississippi. Each region is staffed by a Regional Forester, with either 6 or 7 Area Foresters assigned to individual regions.

== 16th Section Lands ==
The Mississippi Forestry Commission provides resource management on the state's 480,000 acres of forested 16th Section School Trust Lands in a cooperative arrangement with the Mississippi Secretary of State and local school districts. For some school districts in Mississippi, revenues from 16th Section timber sales and associated hunting and fishing leases have been their only source of funds.
