= Mississippi Commission for Volunteer Service =

The Mississippi Commission for Volunteer Service is the state agency in Mississippi that oversees national service programs and a growing network of Volunteer Centers. Its mission: to engage and support volunteers of all ages and backgrounds in service to their communities. Like its sister agencies in the other 49 states, the Mississippi Commission (MCVS) passes through federal funds from the Corporation for National and Community Service to Mississippi nonprofits to host AmeriCorps programs.

MCVS is led by a board of 24 Governor-appointed Commissioners who guide the general direction of the agency and who have fiduciary and programmatic responsibility for the MCVS's portfolio. A staff of 17 work on AmeriCorps, disability inclusion, and the Volunteer Center network. Administrative, fiscal, and training staff support these programs.

== History ==
On September 1, 2005 – just two days after Hurricane Katrina touched down, devastating the Mississippi Gulf Coast – Mississippi Governor Haley Barbour tasked the Mississippi Commission for Volunteer Service to create and staff a call center to

Ten Volunteer Centers provide volunteers with access to information about local opportunities. Through a partnership with the Points of Light and Hands on Network, Mississippi supports Volunteer Mississippi, a clearinghouse of opportunities, most of which are related to Hurricane Katrina recovery.

== Partnerships with other agencies ==
The Mississippi Commission for Volunteer Service works in partnership with many other state agencies, nonprofits, and businesses, all with a goal to increase opportunities for citizens to volunteer. A few of these partners include the Mississippi Center for Nonprofits.

== See also ==
- Volunteer Centers
- Volunteerism
