= Nationwide Mutual Insurance Company =

Group of large insurance and financial services companies in the United States

- Logo used since 2014

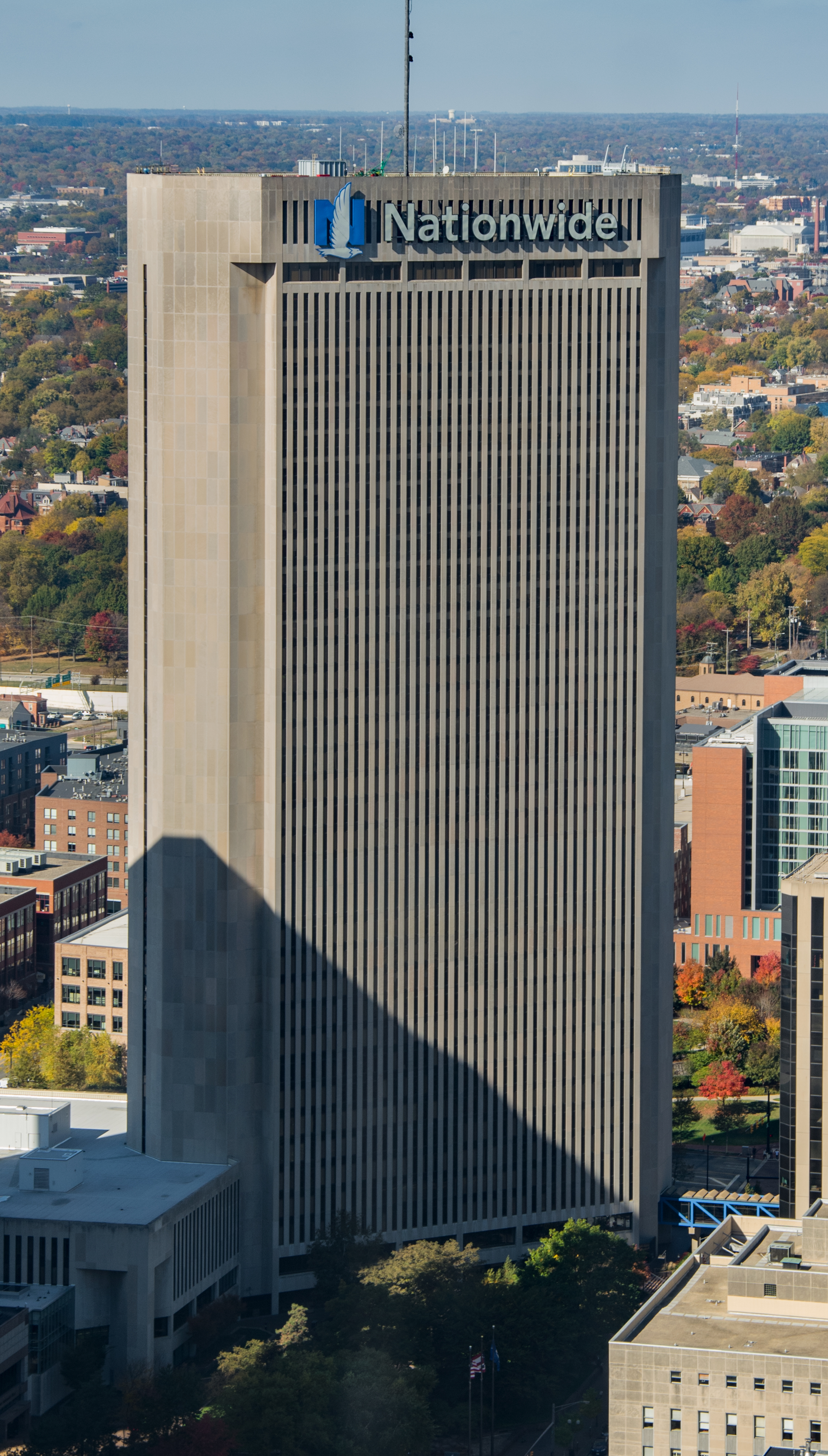
- One Nationwide Plaza, the headquarters of Nationwide Insurance.
- Formerly: Farm Bureau Mutual Automobile Insurance Company (1926-1955)
- Type: Private (mutual)
- Industry: Financial services
- Founded: April 14, 1926; 100 years ago
- Headquarters: One Nationwide Plaza, Columbus, Ohio, U.S.
- Key people: Jeffrey Zellers (chairman); Kirt Walker (CEO)
- Products: Insurance, Investments, Retirement
- Revenue: ▲US$58.6 billion (2024)
- Net income: ▲US$3.2 billion (2024)
- Total assets: ▲US$322.3 billion (2024)
- Number of employees: ~24,000
- Website: nationwide.com

Nationwide Mutual Insurance Company and affiliated companies, commonly shortened to Nationwide, is a group of large U.S. insurance and financial services companies based in Columbus, Ohio. The company also operates regional headquarters in Scottsdale, Arizona and Des Moines, Iowa. Nationwide currently has approximately 24,000 employees, and is ranked 69th in the 2026 Fortune 500 list.

Nationwide Financial Services (NFS), a component of the group, was partially floated on the New York Stock Exchange prior to being repurchased by Nationwide Mutual in 2009. It had owned the majority of NFS common stock since it had gone public in 1997.

== History ==
=== Beginnings as Farm Bureau Mutual ===
In the 1920s, farmers were paying the same rates on their automobile insurance as city drivers even though they had fewer accidents and claims than city drivers. The Ohio Farm Bureau decided to set up its own insurance company to offer rates that accurately reflected the driving habits of farmers. On April 10, 1926, the Farm Bureau Mutual Automobile Insurance Company obtained a license to do business in Ohio, and two days later, it acquired its financing—a $10,000 loan drawn from the membership dues of the Ohio Farm Bureau Federation.

At that time, Ohio law required 100 people to pledge to become policyholders. The first agents managed to recruit ten times that number, and on April 14, 1926, Farm Bureau Mutual started a business with over 1,000 policyholders. The first product of the new company, as its name implied, was automobile insurance. The company wrote policies only to Ohio farmers who were members for the Ohio Farm Bureau.

=== Expansion ===
In 1928, Farm Bureau Mutual expanded to West Virginia, followed by Maryland, Delaware, Vermont, and North Carolina. Farm Bureau Mutual began underwriting residents of small towns in 1931 and residents in larger cities in 1934. Also, in 1934, Farm Bureau Mutual began offering fire insurance. This product grew the following year with the purchase of a struggling fire insurance company.

In 1935, Farm Bureau Mutual acquired the Life Insurance Company of America from the bankrupt fraternal insurer, American Insurance Union. The company was later renamed to Farm Bureau Life Insurance Company in 1938.

With growth, came a need for the expansion of office space. In 1936, the company moved into the 246 Building at 246 N. High Street in Columbus.

By 1943, Farm Bureau Mutual operated in 12 states and the District of Columbia. Even with the tripling of space in the 246 Building (which was finally dedicated on the 25th anniversary of the company), Farm Bureau Mutual still had insufficient office space and began opening regional offices in 1951.

In 1955, Farm Bureau Mutual changed its name to Nationwide Insurance, a name by which it is commonly known today. In the 10 years that followed, Nationwide expanded into Oregon, making the company truly "nationwide". It also expanded into 19 other states, bringing the total by 1965 to 32 states and the District of Columbia.

Nationwide outgrew the 246 Building by the 1970s, and work began on a new skyscraper headquarters for the company. In 1978, One Nationwide Plaza was completed at the southwest corner of N. High Street and Nationwide Blvd. on the northern edge of downtown Columbus, Ohio. Since 1988, Nationwide has added the following to its presence in Downtown Columbus: Plaza Two (on the northeast corner of High Street and Chestnut), Plaza Three (just west of High Street and Chestnut), Plaza Four (Front Street), 275 Marconi (behind Plazas One and Three on Marconi Blvd), and 10 West Nationwide, which together with Plaza One form the primary downtown complex. In addition to downtown Columbus, Nationwide also has a significant presence in the Columbus, Ohio metropolitan suburbs of Dublin, Grandview Heights, and Grove City.

In 2025, Nationwide closed a $1.25 billion acquisition of a specialty employer benefits line from Allstate Corp. Nationwide also acquired reinsurance renewal rights from Markel Insurance. In October 2025, Nationwide announced a $1.5 billion investment to accelerate technology and AI. In December 2025, Nationwide appointed Michael Carrel as CTO. Carrel is taking over the role from veteran IT executive Jim Fowler.

Previous logo used from 1999 to September 2014

=== Nationwide slogan and jingle ===
The genesis for the Nationwide slogan, "The Man from Nationwide is on your Side" was first introduced to the public in 1965, composed by Steve Karmen, an acclaimed jingle writer and it was later set to music in 1969. But by 1971 being an insurance agent was no longer strictly a male profession, so the words "the Man from" were dropped in 1972, and "Nationwide is on your side" became the slogan, after the first female agent Diana M Krapf was hired and asked that it be changed so she could properly represent the company as an insurance agent. Nationwide did make these changes (i.e. signs, letterheads, TV and print ads, even business cards) showing the changing attitudes of the times and were followed years later by other major companies.

Nationwide Jingle Singers & Performers

- Jana Kramer
- Peyton Manning
- Leslie Odom Jr.
- Brad Paisley
- Rachel Platten
- Julia Roberts
- Jill Scott
- H.E.R.

== Sponsorships ==
=== Growth in Columbus ===
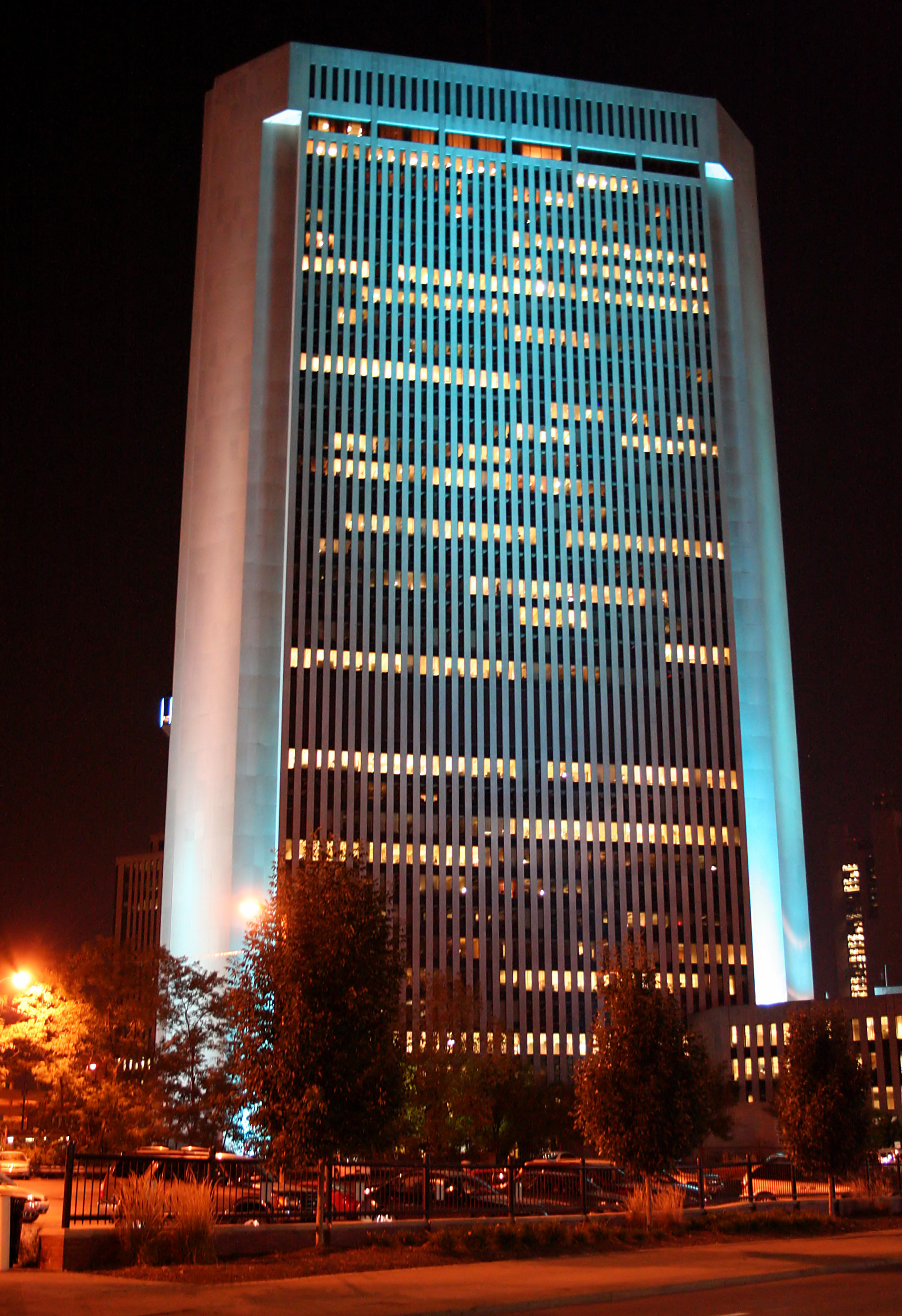
One Nationwide Plaza, the headquarters in Columbus

By 1997, the city of Columbus had grown to become the 15th largest city in the United States. However, Columbus by this time was the largest American city without a professional sports franchise competing in the top leagues in the United States (i.e., Major League Baseball, the National Football League, the National Basketball Association, or the National Hockey League).

After plans to move the Hartford Whalers to Columbus failed when voters rejected a tax levy, the Nationwide Mutual Insurance Company announced that it would build an arena adjacent to One Nationwide Plaza in an effort to bring an NHL franchise to Columbus. This second effort was successful, and the Columbus Blue Jackets began play to at Nationwide Arena in late 2000. Nationwide Arena, named for the company, is the centerpiece of the Arena District, an area of entertainment venues, restaurants, and hotels linking downtown Columbus with The Short North neighborhood.

Nationwide Realty Investors is the company's real estate development arm and was involved with providing the land for a new soccer stadium in Columbus. Nationwide sponsors the Major League Soccer club Columbus Crew, the other major-league sports franchise in town, and has appeared on the front of team shirts since 2020.

=== NASCAR ===
Nationwide became the title sponsor of the NASCAR Nationwide Series beginning in the 2008 season. On September 18, 2013, the company announced it will no longer sponsor the series after 2014 but will remain an official sponsor of NASCAR. From 2015-2019, Nationwide was the primary sponsor for Dale Earnhardt Jr. in the Sprint Cup Series.

=== Memorial Tournament ===
On September 3, 2010, Nationwide announced a six-year deal to become the presenting sponsor of the PGA Tour Memorial Tournament beginning with the 2010 event. The presenting sponsorship concluded in 2021.

=== Jack Hanna ===
In March 2010, Nationwide announced it would be co-sponsoring Columbus Zoo and Aquarium Director Emeritus Jack Hanna's Into the Wild TV show and national speaking tour.

== The companies ==
Nationwide is one of the largest insurance and financial services companies in the world, focusing on domestic property and casualty insurance, life insurance and retirement savings, asset management, and strategic investments.

Previously Owned Companies

- Nationwide Communications, a broadcasting company that owned radio station WNCI

== Technology ==
=== Enterprise Collaboration ===
Nationwide's internal collaboration platform "SPOT" is an advanced enterprise social media platform that combines Yammer and SharePoint to provide a unified experience to Nationwide employees.

=== Mobile claims application ===
In 2009, Nationwide released Nationwide Mobile, a free iPhone application for Nationwide auto insurance customers and other iPhone users. The app is designed to assist drivers with the steps to take after an accident. It also helps Nationwide customers start the claims process, finds Nationwide-certified local repair shops, and facilitates the exchange of accident and insurance information. Nationwide was the first US insurer to offer such an application for the iPhone.

== CEOs ==
CEO	Years served
Lee B. Palmer	1926–1928
George L. Cooley	1928–1939
Murray Lincoln	1939–1964
Bowman Doss	1964–1969
George Dunlap	1969–1972
Dean Jeffers	1972–1981
John Fisher	1981–1992
Dimon McFerson	1992 - 2000
Jerry Jurgensen	2001 – 2009
Steve Rasmussen	2009 – October 2019
Kirt Walker	October 2019 – present

== Controversies ==
=== Death benefit controversy ===
In October 2012, Nationwide agreed to pay $7.2 million to resolve a market conduct investigation by a multistate insurance regulator task force regarding its use of the Social Security Death Master File database for paying life insurance claims. Life insurance policies make it clear that it is up to the beneficiaries to notify the insurer. Most insured do notify their insurance companies but as a result of this exam Nationwide identified $144 million in benefits that had not been paid because of customers' failure to file a claims report. The agreement was announced by California Insurance Commissioner Dave Jones on behalf of California, Florida, Illinois, New Hampshire, North Dakota, Pennsylvania, and Ohio. The settlement reached with the state insurance regulators will commit Nationwide and other insurers to compare its records against the Social Security Death Index and conduct a search for beneficiaries.

=== Claims of bad faith ===
In June 2014, Nationwide was hit with an $18 million punitive damages award after a plaintiff proved the company "strong-armed its policyholder rather than negotiating in good faith to compensate the plaintiff for the loss suffered in an automobile collision."

=== Super Bowl ad ===
During the second quarter of Super Bowl XLIX, Nationwide aired a controversial commercial to promote its Make Safe Happen child safety website and initiative, in which a deceased boy reflects on what life milestones he could not partake in due to his premature death in an accident. The advertisement was scorned and ridiculed by many as morbid, disturbing, and in poor taste against the backdrop of a major, upbeat professional sports event. Following its negative reception, Nationwide released a statement defending its decision to air the ad, explaining that child safety is a serious issue that must be addressed.

== See also ==
- List of United States insurance companies
