= StormReady =

United States community preparedness program

The StormReady logo.

StormReady is a community preparedness program in the United States that encourages government entities and commercial gathering sites to prepare for severe storms. The program, sponsored by the United States National Weather Service, issues recognition to communities and sites across the country that demonstrate severe weather readiness. The program is voluntary, and provides communities with clear-cut advice from a partnership with the local National Weather Service Office, state and local emergency managers, and the media. The program has been credited with saving the lives of more than 50 movie-goers in Van Wert County, Ohio in November 2002. As of June 1, 2011, there were 1,752 StormReady sites in 50 states.

== History and background ==
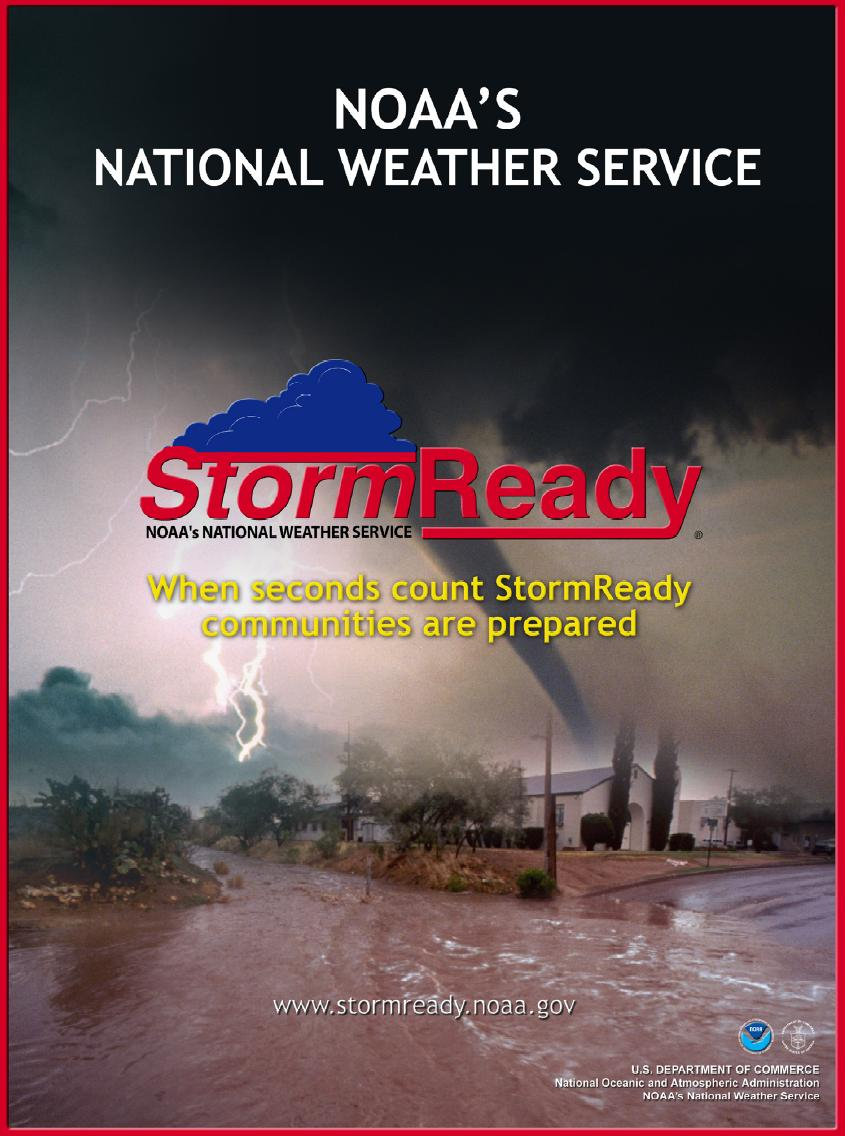
The National Weather Service's StormReady Poster

The United States experiences, on average, about 10,000 thunderstorms, 5,000 floods, and 1,000 tornadoes, as well as an average of 2 deadly hurricanes, each year. Some 90% of all presidentially-declared disaster areas are weather-related, leading to around 500 deaths per year and nearly $14 billion in damage.

StormReady was initiated in 1999 in Tulsa, Oklahoma, in an area which has experienced a number of severe tornadoes; there has been at least one tornado in the Tulsa area each year since 1950. Its sponsors saw formal recognition as a way to increase cooperation among the various agencies responsible for disaster preparedness.

The program was originally called StormWise; in 2002, the StormReady logo and name became officially registered trademarks of the National Weather Service. The program has increased its scope at a steady rate ever since. Walt Disney World received the recognition in 2006. The sites in June 2011 comprised 874 counties, 721 communities, 72 universities, 10 Native American tribal nations, 37 commercial sites, and 36 military/government sites.

A TsunamiReady program has been instituted using many of the same criteria. There are currently 84 TsunamiReady Sites in 10 states, Puerto Rico and Guam and 144 StormReady Supporters

== Recognition ==
To be officially StormReady, a community or site must:

- Establish a 24-hour warning point and emergency operations center;
- Have redundant communications systems to receive severe weather forecasts and warnings and to alert the public.
- Create a system that monitors local weather conditions;
- Promote the importance of public readiness through community seminars;
- Develop a formal hazardous weather plan, which includes training severe weather spotters and holding emergency exercises.

At a minimum, NOAA Weather Radios (NWRs), with tone alert and particularly Specific Area Message Encoding (SAME) capability, must be located at four sites within StormReady communities including emergency operations centers, 24-hour warning points, city hall, and all school superintendent offices. In addition to being in homes and offices, NOAA recommends that NOAA Weather Radios also be at the following locations: courthouses, libraries, schools, day care centers, movie theaters, hospitals, senior citizen homes, recreation facilities, sports arenas, public utilities, fairgrounds, and other sites where the general public may gather.

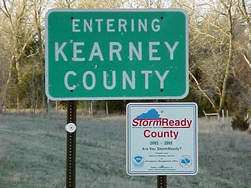
Kearney County, Nebraska, displays a StormReady sign

The National Weather Service (NWS) SKYWARN storm spotter program trains emergency managers, dispatchers, other first responders such as police officers and firefighters, and the general public on how to stay vigilant by identifying features in clouds that usually preclude the occurrence of severe weather. Trained SKYWARN storm spotters report hazardous weather conditions to their local NWS offices; amateur radio operators are also invited to participate.

An advisory board, composed of NWS Warning Coordination Meteorologists and state and local emergency managers, reviews applications from municipalities and visits the locations to verify the steps made in the process to become StormReady. StormReady communities must stay freshly prepared, because the designation is only valid for three years.

== Funding ==
The National Weather Service does not fund the program in forms other than review and recognition. One of its goals is to help local emergency managers justify costs and purchases related to supporting their hazardous weather-related programs. It does, however, issue a sign that communities may display.

== Success ==
A tornado struck and destroyed a movie theater in Van Wert County on November 10, 2002, about 28 minutes after a tornado warning was issued. Media coverage of the event emphasized that the theater was screening the film Santa Clause 2 - there were a number of children at the show.

The first StormReady Community Hero Award was presented to Van Wert County Emergency Manager Rick McCoy, County Commissioner Gary Adams, and Van Wert City Mayor Stephen Gehres for establishing the county's StormReady program with the NWS. Van Wert Cinemas assistant manager Scott Shaffer was given the NWS Public Service Award for ushering moviegoers to safety after hearing the warning; he had attended a meeting sponsored by local emergency management agencies, and was able to direct the theater patrons to the safest areas within the building.

== See also ==
- 2002 Veterans Day Weekend tornado outbreak
