= National Register of Historic Places listings in Marshall County, Alabama =

Location of Marshall County in Alabama

This is a list of the National Register of Historic Places listings in Marshall County, Alabama.

This is intended to be a complete list of the properties and districts on the National Register of Historic Places in Marshall County, Alabama, United States. Latitude and longitude coordinates are provided for many National Register properties and districts; these locations may be seen together in an online map.

There are 15 properties and districts listed on the National Register in the county.

This National Park Service list is complete through NPS recent listings posted January 16, 2026.

== Current listings ==
| | Name on the Register | Image | Date listed | Location | City or town | Description |
|---|---|---|---|---|---|---|
| 1 | Albertville Depot | Albertville Depot | February 20, 1975 (#75000320) | E. Main St. 34°16′00″N 86°12′22″W | Albertville | Also known as the L&N Railroad Depot. |
| 2 | Company E of the 167th Infantry of the Alabama National Guard Armory | Company E of the 167th Infantry of the Alabama National Guard Armory | August 12, 2005 (#05000842) | Rayburn Ave. 34°20′58″N 86°18′09″W | Guntersville | |
| 3 | Downtown Guntersville Historic District | Downtown Guntersville Historic District | December 12, 2012 (#12001022) | Gunter & Blount Aves., Ringold & Scott Sts. 34°21′32″N 86°17′36″W | Guntersville | |
| 4 | Guntersville City School | Guntersville City School | November 15, 2003 (#03001135) | 1120 Rayburn Ave. 34°21′04″N 86°18′10″W | Guntersville | |
| 5 | Guntersville Hydroelectric Project | Guntersville Hydroelectric Project | July 26, 2016 (#16000432) | 3464 Snow Point Rd. 34°25′18″N 86°23′38″W | Guntersville | |
| 6 | Guntersville Post Office Building | Guntersville Post Office Building | August 16, 2010 (#10000558) | 520 Gunter Ave. 34°21′28″N 86°17′42″W | Guntersville | |
| 7 | Albert G. Henry Jr. House | Albert G. Henry Jr. House | April 13, 1989 (#89000291) | 308 Blount Ave. 34°21′38″N 86°17′31″W | Guntersville | |
| 8 | Henry-Jordan House | Henry-Jordan House | September 4, 1979 (#79003351) | 301 Blount Ave. 34°21′39″N 86°17′28″W | Guntersville | |
| 9 | Julia Street Memorial United Methodist Church | Julia Street Memorial United Methodist Church | July 22, 1999 (#99000855) | 302 Thomas Ave. 34°12′04″N 86°09′44″W | Boaz | |
| 10 | Kate Duncan Smith Daughters of the American Revolution School | Kate Duncan Smith Daughters of the American Revolution School | October 2, 2002 (#02000478) | 6077 Main St. 34°32′00″N 86°15′11″W | Grant | Established by the Daughters of the American Revolution in the 1920s; still functions as a K-12 school |
| 11 | Saratoga Victory Mill | Saratoga Victory Mill | April 12, 1984 (#84000659) | 1821 Gunter Ave. 34°20′23″N 86°18′33″W | Guntersville | |
| 12 | Snead Junior College Historic District | Snead Junior College Historic District | April 22, 1999 (#99000468) | 220 N. Walnut St., 308 W. Mann Ave., 201 College Ave., and 300 and 301 Elder St. 34°12′02″N 86°10′08″W | Boaz | |
| 13 | Thomas A. Snellgrove Homestead | Thomas A. Snellgrove Homestead | February 23, 1996 (#96000167) | 5115 E. Mann Ave., 310 Mill Ave. 34°11′57″N 86°09′34″W | Boaz | |
| 14 | U.S. Post Office | U.S. Post Office | June 21, 1983 (#83002980) | 107 W. Main St. 34°16′05″N 86°12′34″W | Albertville | Currently serves as the Albertville Board of Education building. |
| 15 | Edward Fenns Whitman House | Edward Fenns Whitman House | September 26, 1997 (#97001163) | 200 Thomas Ave. 34°12′04″N 86°09′48″W | Boaz | |

== Former listings ==
| | Name on the Register | Image | Date listed | Date removed | Location | City or town | Description |
|---|---|---|---|---|---|---|---|
| 1 | Hotel Thompson | | May 8, 1986 (#86001002) | May 11, 1989 | 104 First Ave. NE | Arab | |

== See also ==
- List of National Historic Landmarks in Alabama
- National Register of Historic Places listings in Alabama
