= Henry House =

Henry House or Henry's House may refer to:

== Places ==
=== Canada ===
- Henry House (Halifax, Nova Scotia), a National Historic Site of Canada
- Henry's House, Alberta, a former minor trading post

=== United States ===
- Albert G. Henry Jr. House, Guntersville, Alabama, listed on the NRHP in Marshall County, Alabama, also known as Henry House
- Henry–Jordan House, Guntersville, Alabama, listed on the NRHP in Marshall County, Alabama, also known as Henry House
- Henry House (Marion, Alabama), NRHP-listed
- Oakland/Henry House Hopkinsville, Kentucky, listed on the NRHP in Christian County, Kentucky, also known as Henry House
- Joseph Henry House, Princeton, New Jersey, NRHP-listed, also known as Henry House
- Hugh Henry House, Henryetta, Oklahoma, listed on the NRHP in Okmulgee County, Oklahoma, also known as Henry House
- Henry House (Binfield, Tennessee), listed on the National Register of Historic Places in Blount County, Tennessee
- Henry House (Bennington, Vermont), listed on the NRHP as "William Henry House"
- Henry House (Suamico, Wisconsin), listed on the NRHP in Brown County, Wisconsin

== People ==
- Henry Alonzo House (1840–1930), inventor
- Harry House (1919–2006), Australian rules footballer

== Other ==
- Henry's House (video game), a 1984 video game
- Henry's House (PR firm), a London-based creative public relations agency

== See also ==
- Henry Howse (1841–1914), English surgeon
