= Downtown Guntersville Historic District =

Historic district in Alabama, United States

- U.S. National Register of Historic Places
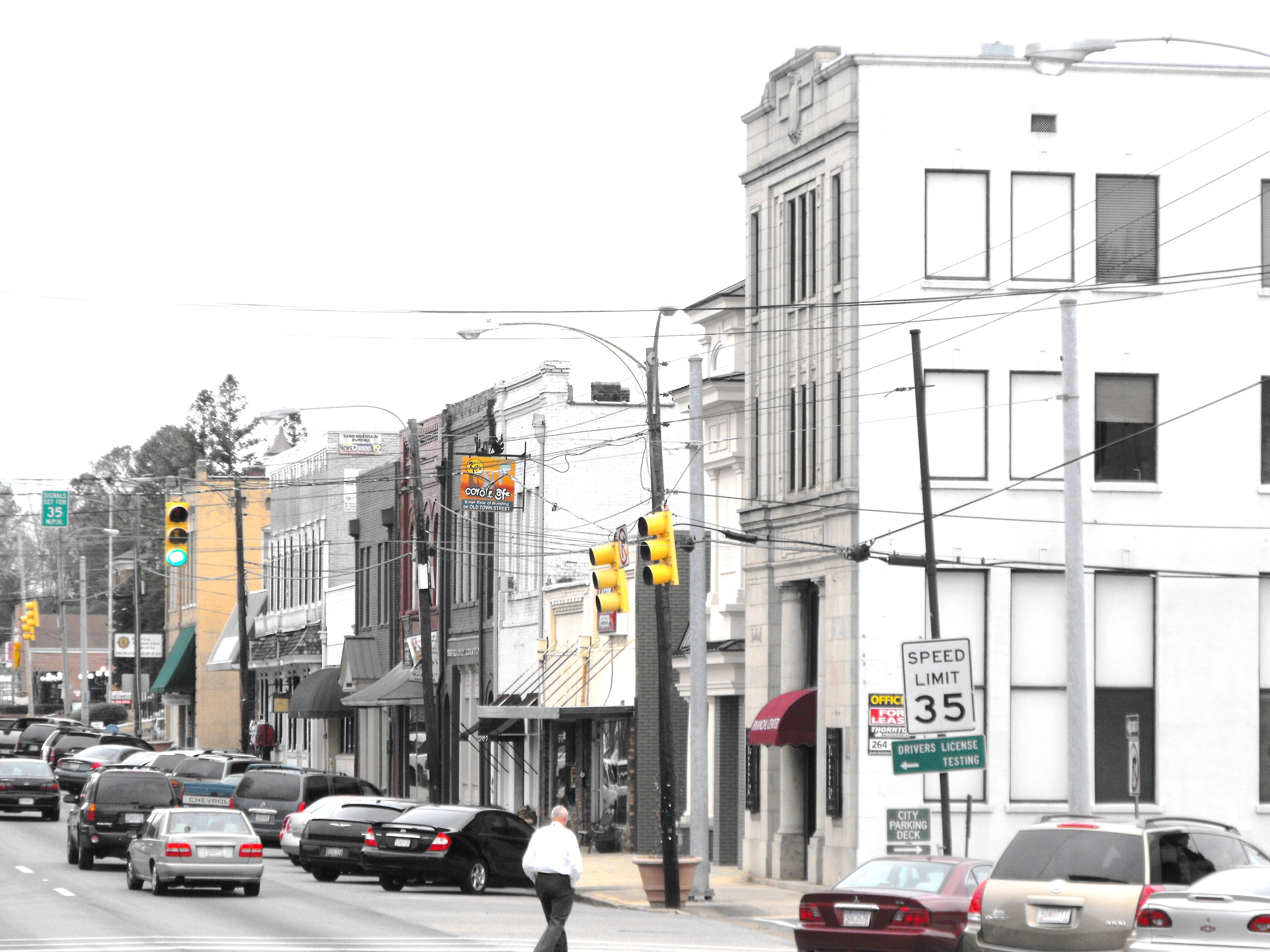
- Buildings on Gunter Avenue in 2009

- Location within Alabama Location within the United States
- Location: Roughly bounded by Gunter & Blount Aves., Ringold & Scott Sts., Guntersville, Alabama
- Coordinates: 34°21′32″N 86°17′36″W
- NRHP reference No.: 12001022
- Added to NRHP: December 12, 2012

The Downtown Guntersville Historic District is a historic district in Guntersville, Alabama. The district includes most of the central business district of Guntersville, as well as some houses. The town was founded in the 1820s as a port on the Tennessee River. Most of the town was destroyed during the Civil War, although the Henry-Jordan House was spared. The business district began to rebuild after the war, and development was spurred in the late 19th and early 20th century by the Nashville, Chattanooga and St. Louis Railway and by manufacturing firms. The opening of Guntersville Dam by the Tennessee Valley Authority in 1939 turned Guntersville into a peninsula, and created tourism and recreation opportunities on the new lake. Many commercial buildings were constructed after World War II until 1964, in contrast to many small-town downtown areas. Popular architectural styles from the time are represented, including elaborately decorated Victorian, simpler commercial brick styles, and post-war streamlined styles. Notable contributing properties in the district are the Albert G. Henry, Jr., House, the Henry-Jordan House, and the Guntersville Post Office, all of which are individually listed on the National Register of Historic Places. The district was listed on the National Register in 2012.
