= List of tornadoes in the outbreak of April 22–25, 2010 =

Below is the list of tornadoes that were confirmed by National Weather Service officials during the tornado outbreak of April 22–25, 2010 in the United States.

Confirmed tornadoes by Enhanced Fujita rating
EFU	EF0	EF1	EF2	EF3	EF4	EF5	Total
0	56	17	9	4	2	0	88

== April 22 event ==
List of confirmed tornadoes – Thursday, April 22, 2010 (Note: All dates are based on the local time zone where the tornado touched down; however, all times are in Coordinated Universal Time for consistency.)
EF#	Location	County / Parish	State	Start Coord.	Time (UTC)	Path length	Max width	Summary
EF0	SE of Las Animas (1st tornado)	Bent	CO	37.9883°N 103.1502°W	19:05–19:12	4.69 mi (7.55 km)	100 yd (91 m)	Tornado remained in open country with no damage.
EF0	SE of Las Animas (2nd tornado)	Bent	CO	38.0102°N 103.1535°W	19:08–19:13	2.45 mi (3.94 km)	50 yd (46 m)	Tornado remained in open country with no damage.
EF0	N of Hasty (1st tornado)	Bent	CO	38.172°N 102.9727°W	1935–19:37	0.59 mi (0.95 km)	50 yd (46 m)	Tornado remained in open country with no damage.
EF0	N of Hasty (2nd tornado)	Bent	CO	38.2025°N 102.961°W	19:48–19:53	1.92 mi (3.09 km)	150 yd (140 m)	Tornado observed by storm chasers. No damage reported.
EF0	NNW of McClave	Bent	CO	38.2514°N 102.9428°W	19:57–19:58	0.58 mi (0.93 km)	50 yd (46 m)	Tornado remained in open country with no damage.
EF0	SSW of Eads (1st tornado)	Kiowa	CO	38.2938°N 102.9101°W	20:22–20:27	3.35 mi (5.39 km)	50 yd (46 m)	Tornado reported on the ground. Remained over open fields with no damage.
EF1	W of Eads	Kiowa	CO	38.3555°N 102.8824°W	20:29–20:49	7.22 mi (11.62 km)	200 yd (180 m)	A barn and empty livestock tank were destroyed.
EF0	SSW of Eads (2nd tornado)	Kiowa	CO	38.3653°N 102.8308°W	20:36–20:38	0.36 mi (0.58 km)	50 yd (46 m)	Brief tornado over open country with no damage.
EF0	SSW of Eads (3rd tornado)	Kiowa	CO	38.4238°N 102.8228°W	20:45–20:54	2.56 mi (4.12 km)	50 yd (46 m)	Tornado reported on the ground. Remained over open fields with no damage.
EF0	SSW of Eads (4th tornado)	Kiowa	CO	38.4581°N 102.7941°W	20:55–20:57	0.73 mi (1.17 km)	25 yd (23 m)	Tornado reported on the ground. Remained over open fields with no damage.
EF0	S of Eads	Kiowa	CO	38.4442°N 102.7712°W	20:56–21:04	1.36 mi (2.19 km)	50 yd (46 m)	Tornado reported on the ground. Remained over open fields with no damage.
EF0	ENE of Eads	Kiowa	CO	38.4856°N 102.7607°W	21:00–21:04	1.18 mi (1.90 km)	75 yd (69 m)	Tornado reported on the ground. Remained over open fields with no damage.
EF0	NNW of Eads	Kiowa	CO	38.581°N 102.829°W	21:12–21:14	1.2 mi (1.9 km)	50 yd (46 m)	Tornado reported on the ground. Remained over open fields with no damage.
EF0	SW of Deer Trail	Elbert	CO	39.52°N 104.16°W	21:28	0.1 mi (0.16 km)	50 yd (46 m)	Spotter reported tornado on the ground. No damage reported.
EF0	W of Leader	Adams	CO	39.91°N 104.08°W	21:38	0.1 mi (0.16 km)	50 yd (46 m)	Spotters reported tornado on the ground. No damage reported.
EF1	SSW of Lakin	Kearny	KS	37.8838°N 101.4324°W	21:48–22:02	9.4 mi (15.1 km)	1,760 yd (1,610 m)	Large wedge tornado reported to be 1 mi (1.6 km) wide. Pivot sprinklers and barns were damaged. It was strong, but affected a sparsely populated area. Downgraded from EF2 to EF1.
EF0	NE of Goodnight	Armstrong	TX	35.0812°N 101.1375°W	21:59–22:02	1.83 mi (2.95 km)	50 yd (46 m)	Tornado remained in open country with no damage.
EF0	NW of Lakin	Kearny	KS	37.9607°N 101.3247°W	22:04–22:18	4.9 mi (7.9 km)	440 yd (400 m)	This large tornado touched down as the previous one dissipated. However, it traversed sparsely populated areas, causing no damage.
EF0	SE of Groom	Donley	TX	35.16°N 100.98°W	22:10–22:26	5.24 mi (8.43 km)	100 yd (91 m)	Tornado remained in open country with no damage.
EF1	Goodnight area	Armstrong	TX	34.9866°N 101.2011°W	22:20–22:43	10.34 mi (16.64 km)	100 yd (91 m)	Damage limited to two broken power poles and shrubs ripped from ground as the tornado remained primarily in open country.
EF0	NE of Kit Carson	Cheyenne	CO	38.8904°N 102.6945°W	22:24–22:28	2.33 mi (3.75 km)	75 yd (69 m)	Public report of a tornado on the ground. Tornado remained over open country with no damage.
EF0	NW of Deerfield	Kearny	KS	38.0391°N 101.2145°W	22:32–22:36	2.61 mi (4.20 km)	150 yd (140 m)	Storm spotters observed a small tornado that did not impact anything.
EF0	E of Lake McClellan	Gray	TX	35.22°N 100.85°W	22:38–22:40	0.49 mi (0.79 km)	25 yd (23 m)	Brief tornado remained in open country with no damage.
EF0	SW of Kit Carson	Cheyenne	CO	38.7515°N 102.8332°W	22:40–22:44	1.35 mi (2.17 km)	50 yd (46 m)	Spotters reported tornado on the ground for 4 minutes. Remained over open country with no damage.
EF0	S of Bryans Corner	Beaver	OK	36.50°N 100.82°W	22:51–22:52	0.23 mi (0.37 km)	25 yd (23 m)	Brief tornado remained in open country with no damage.
EF0	ESE of Groom	Donley	TX	35.16°N 100.98°W	23:07–23:09	0.59 mi (0.95 km)	25 yd (23 m)	Brief tornado remained in open country with no damage.
EF1	NE of Lakin to W of Friend	Finney	KS	38.2147°N 101.0888°W	23:10–23:23	2.69 mi (4.33 km)	880 yd (800 m)	A tornado was witnessed by storm chasers and storm spotters doing minor damage in a sparsely populated area..
EF0	NW of Firstview	Cheyenne	CO	38.8683°N 102.6624°W	23:12–23:20	2.59 mi (4.17 km)	75 yd (69 m)	Tornado was rain-wrapped. No damage reported.
EF0	NW of Garden City	Finney	KS	38.2255°N 101.0559°W	23:17–23:19	0.93 mi (1.50 km)	75 yd (69 m)	Satellite tornado to the previous event. No damage was caused by this weak tornado.
EF0	SW of Shallow Water	Scott	KS	38.2706°N 101.0356°W	23:27–23:37	3.32 mi (5.34 km)	440 yd (400 m)	A tornado quickly became rain-wrapped after it was sighted. Little damage occurred.
EF0	NE of Lake McClellan	Gray	TX	35.26°N 100.80°W	23:30–23:52	9 mi (14 km)	440 yd (400 m)	Intermittent large tornado remained in open country.
EF0	NNW of Lakin	Kearny	KS	38.1258°N 101.2949°W	23:39–23:46	2.72 mi (4.38 km)	200 yd (180 m)	A stovepipe tornado traveled across rural land causing no damage.
EF0	NE of Lefors	Gray	TX	35.4909°N 100.6394°W	23:40–23:50	4.47 mi (7.19 km)	100 yd (91 m)	Tornado remained in open country with no damage.
EF0	N of Firstview (1st tornado)	Cheyenne	CO	39.0071°N 102.535°W	23:52–23:54	1.07 mi (1.72 km)	25 yd (23 m)	Tornado reported on North side of intersection of County Road DD and County Road 34 moving Northeast. No damage reported.
EF0	N of Firstview (2nd tornado)	Cheyenne	CO	39.0222°N 102.4963°W	00:05–00:09	1.42 mi (2.29 km)	25 yd (23 m)	Tornado seen on the ground for about 5 minutes before roping out. No damage reported.
EF0	WNW of Shallow Water to SSE of Scott City	Scott	KS	38.389°N 100.9654°W	00:06–00:19	7.2 mi (11.6 km)	440 yd (400 m)	A wedge tornado was observed by storm chasers. Several barns, shed and two pivot-irrigation sprinklers were damaged.
EF2	NE of Matador to SW of Cee Vee	Motley, Cottle	TX	34.153°N 100.6636°W	00:20–00:45	9 mi (14 km)	1,300 yd (1,200 m)	Large rain-wrapped wedge tornado destroyed a storage shed, a windmill and electrical transformers. Trees were also uprooted. Upgraded from EF1 to EF2 in post-analysis.
EF0	S of Manning	Scott	KS	38.5157°N 100.7167°W	00:40–00:46	1.4 mi (2.3 km)	150 yd (140 m)	A weak tornado was spotted over a sparsely populated area, causing no damage.
EF3	S of Cee Vee	Cottle	TX	34.1688°N 100.5119°W	00:46–01:20	12.25 mi (19.71 km)	975 yd (892 m)	Large wedge tornado touched down as the previous one dissipated. It destroyed an unoccupied house and many farm buildings. Trees and shrubs were also uprooted, farming equipment was overturned, and a heavy steel tank was knocked over. Upgraded from EF1 to EF3 in post-analysis.
EF0	SSE of Healy	Lane	KS	38.5569°N 100.5977°W	00:57–01:07	3.7 mi (6.0 km)	150 yd (140 m)	This was the last tornado from this long-tracked supercell. It occurred over a sparsely populated area, causing no damage.
EF0	NW of Swearingen	Cottle	TX	34.15°N 100.22°W	02:05–02:12	5 mi (8.0 km)	150 yd (140 m)	Tornado remained in open country with no damage.
EF0	SE of Gove	Gove	KS	38.8387°N 100.3613°W	02:21–02:22	0.52 mi (0.84 km)	10 yd (9.1 m)	Brief tornado reported by a local law enforcement. No damage reported.

== April 23 event ==
List of confirmed tornadoes – Friday, April 23, 2010
EF#	Location	County / Parish	State	Start Coord.	Time (UTC)	Path length	Max width	Summary
EF0	NE of Genoa	Lincoln	CO	39.34°N 103.42°W	17:17	0.1 mi (0.16 km)	50 yd (46 m)	Report of brief tornado on the ground.
EF1	NE of Swiftown	Leflore	MS	33.3366°N 90.4158°W	20:48–20:51	2 mi (3.2 km)	50 yd (46 m)	Several powerlines were knocked down and a power pole was snapped.
EF0	NNE of Pendleton	Warren	MO	38.857°N 91.2067°W	23:40–23:41	0.1 mi (0.16 km)	10 yd (9.1 m)	Brief tornado touchdown in an open field.
EF0	SSE of New Truxton	Warren	MO	38.9051°N 91.1803°W	00:11–00:12	0.12 mi (0.19 km)	10 yd (9.1 m)	Brief tornado touchdown in an open field.
EF0	W of Hawk Point	Lincoln	MO	38.97°N 91.1486°W	00:29–00:30	0.21 mi (0.34 km)	20 yd (18 m)	Brief tornado touchdown in an open field.
EF0	SW of Atlanta	Cass	TX	33.0808°N 94.2455°W	00:34–00:41	4.8 mi (7.7 km)	50 yd (46 m)	Damage limited to a few trees.
EF0	NW of Queen City, TX to Fouke, AR	Cass (TX), Miller (AR)	TX	33.1541°N 94.1611°W	00:41–01:13	17.62 mi (28.36 km)	100 yd (91 m)	Long-track tornado primarily damaged trees, a few of which landed on vehicles or houses with minor damage.
EF0	SW of Silex	Lincoln	MO	39.10°N 91.10°W	00:48–00:49	0.11 mi (0.18 km)	10 yd (9.1 m)	Brief tornado touchdown in an open field.
EF0	NNE of Silex	Lincoln	MO	39.1583°N 91.0586°W	01:14	0.14 mi (0.23 km)	10 yd (9.1 m)	Brief tornado touchdown in an open field.

== April 24 event ==
List of confirmed tornadoes – Saturday, April 24, 2010
EF#	Location	County / Parish	State	Start Coord.	Time (UTC)	Path length	Max width	Summary
EF1	Mabank	Kaufman	TX	32.3699°N 96.1034°W	06:44–06:45	0.16 mi (0.26 km)	30 yd (27 m)	A brief tornado touched down and heavily damaged a home before dissipating.
EF0	NNW of Mineola	Wood	TX	32.818°N 95.451°W	07:31–07:36	4.23 mi (6.81 km)	100 yd (91 m)	Several large trees were uprooted damaging a few houses. Three people were injured.
EF0	E of Winnsboro	Wood	TX	32.938°N 95.2291°W	07:45–07:49	1.62 mi (2.61 km)	70 yd (64 m)	Tornado touched down along Highway 11 destroying a metal hay barn.
EF0	NE of Farmerville	Union	LA	32.92°N 92.368°W	11:57–11:58	0.54 mi (0.87 km)	70 yd (64 m)	Several small trees and branches were snapped.
EF1	S of Raleigh	Smith	MS	31.9379°N 89.6386°W	13:43–13:58	10.69 mi (17.20 km)	50 yd (46 m)	Damage limited to numerous trees snapped or uprooted.
EF2	NNE of Montrose to S of Meridian Regional Airport	Jasper, Newton, Lauderdale	MS	32.1575°N 89.1141°W	14:22–14:52	22.89 mi (36.84 km)	1,056 yd (966 m)	This large wedge tornado produced major structural roof damage to a church. Shingles and siding were blown off of a house, and an outbuilding was destroyed along with damage to a grain silo. Thousands of large softwood and hardwood trees were snapped and uprooted throughout the path. In addition, numerous power lines were blown down. It dissipated before reaching more densely populated ares, just south of the Meridian Regional Airport.
EF0	Ward	Sumter	AL	32.3645°N 88.2842°W	15:44	0.08 mi (0.13 km)	30 yd (27 m)	Brief tornado reported by the local fire department was embedded in a larger field of straight-line wind damage.
EF4	W of Tallulah, LA to S of Yazoo City, MS to N of Sturgis, MS	Madison (LA), Warren (MS), Issaquena (MS), Sharkey (MS), Yazoo (MS), Holmes (MS), Attala (MS), Choctaw (MS), Oktibbeha (MS)	LA, MS	32.4032°N 91.2993°W	16:09–18:53	148.97 mi (239.74 km)	3,080 yd (2,820 m)	10 deaths – See article on this tornado. 146 people were injured.
EF1	SW of Demopolis to SSE of Forkland	Marengo, Greene, Hale	AL	32.5248°N 87.8399°W	16:19–16:35	8.15 mi (13.12 km)	200 yd (180 m)	Many trees and at least 20 vehicles were damaged, some severely. A few buildings were also damaged. Two people were injured.
EF0	New Albany	Union	MS	34.4849°N 88.9644°W	16:20–16:21	0.06 mi (0.097 km)	30 yd (27 m)	Minor roof damage to one house and numerous trees damaged.
EF0	SW of Hogglesville	Hale	AL	32.7628°N 87.5461°W	16:50–17:03	5.83 mi (9.38 km)	100 yd (91 m)	Three houses sustained minor damage and a barn was destroyed.
EF0	NW of Maryville	Nodaway	MO	40.36°N 94.90°W	17:37–17:38	0.06 mi (0.097 km)	25 yd (23 m)	A few tree limbs were knocked down.
EF0	SW of Pickering	Nodaway	MO	40.44°N 94.84°W	17:40–17:41	0.11 mi (0.18 km)	25 yd (23 m)	Brief tornado remained in open country.
EF0	S of Table Rock	Stone, Taney	MO	36.5847°N 93.3165°W	18:40–18:42	0.51 mi (0.82 km)	70 yd (64 m)	Several trees were twisted at Table Rock State Park and a marina was damaged.
EF0	SE of Manila	Mississippi	AR	35.8582°N 90.1086°W	19:05–19:08	2.13 mi (3.43 km)	50 yd (46 m)	Tornado sighted on Big Lake with minor damage to trees.
EF2	N of Starkville	Oktibbeha	MS	33.5302°N 88.8531°W	19:09–19:16	6.98 mi (11.23 km)	800 yd (730 m)	A mobile home was destroyed, 20 houses were damaged and trees and power lines were knocked down. This tornado was produced by the same supercell that produced the Yazoo City EF4.
EF2	NE of West Point	Clay	MS	33.6349°N 88.6019°W	19:28–19:30	1.87 mi (3.01 km)	300 yd (270 m)	Multiple power poles were blown down in a field, trees and power lines were blown down, and an outbuilding was demolished.
EF1	New Hamilton	Monroe	MS	33.7387°N 88.4347°W	19:40–19:50	6.51 mi (10.48 km)	150 yd (140 m)	Numerous trees and power poles snapped along the path, Several homes sustained significant roof damage. A storage shed was destroyed with sheet metal wrapped around trees.
EF0	Pembroke	Christian	KY	36.7595°N 87.3756°W	21:23–21:27	2 mi (3.2 km)	40 yd (37 m)	Minor damage to a house and some tree limbs were damaged.
EF0	Des Peres	St. Louis	MO	38.5906°N 90.4392°W	21:25–21:26	0.61 mi (0.98 km)	300 yd (270 m)	Tornado resulted in widespread tree damage and minor roof damage.
EF2	SSW of Bible Hill to NNW of Only	Decatur, Perry, Humphreys	TN	35.684°N 88.1386°W	21:26–21:57	25.64 mi (41.26 km)	400 yd (370 m)	At least 15 houses were damaged, a few of which were destroyed. Thousands of trees were uprooted which caused most of the damage. Over 14 years since the tornado occurred on October 12, 2024, the tornado got upgraded from EF1 and received a low-end EF2 rating. This was due to how satellite imagery showed severe tree damage consistent of strong tornadoes, hence the rating upgrade.
EF0	S of Guin	Marion	AL	33.9491°N 87.8591°W	21:27–21:38	7.15 mi (11.51 km)	200 yd (180 m)	Tornado made intermittent contact with the ground. Three houses sustained minor damage and two outbuildings were destroyed, along with many trees.
EF0	University City	St. Louis	MO	38.6648°N 90.3403°W	21:30–21:37	4.36 mi (7.02 km)	325 yd (297 m)	Several houses and businesses sustained minor structural damage. Many trees were damaged along the path.
EF1	E of Sunfish	Edmonson	KY	37.2972°N 86.3676°W	21:40–21:42	1.1 mi (1.8 km)	50 yd (46 m)	One house sustained significant damage and a shed was destroyed. Several outbuildings were also damaged.
EF1	SW of Aetna	Hickman	TN	35.6478°N 87.5184°W	23:15–23:17	1.84 mi (2.96 km)	100 yd (91 m)	A trailer and two small sheds were destroyed and about 12 houses sustained minor damage. Hundreds of trees were uprooted or snapped.
EF2	SSE of Good Hope to SSW of Holly Pond	Cullman	AL	34.1036°N 86.8062°W	23:57–00:11	5.75 mi (9.25 km)	300 yd (270 m)	Two chicken houses, a barn and a carport were destroyed and several houses and businesses sustained minor damage. Extensive tree damage along the path.
EF1	W of Ebenezer	Mercer	KY	37.8628°N 84.8352°W	00:25–00:28	1.75 mi (2.82 km)	50 yd (46 m)	Three barns were heavily damaged or destroyed, and many trees were damaged.
EF1	SE of Damascus	Lauderdale, Kemper	MS	32.5731°N 88.8309°W	00:32–00:39	4.32 mi (6.95 km)	100 yd (91 m)	Four barns, a metal building and a shed were heavily damaged or destroyed.
EF0	E of Westmoreland	Macon	TN	36.534°N 86.19°W	00:42–00:44	1.51 mi (2.43 km)	50 yd (46 m)	A small barn was destroyed and numerous trees were damaged.
EF1	S of Berry	Fayette	AL	33.6024°N 87.6769°W	01:06–01:17	6.56 mi (10.56 km)	200 yd (180 m)	Four houses sustained minor damage. Several hundred trees were snapped or uprooted.
EF1	NE of Berry	Fayette, Walker	AL	33.6794°N 87.5386°W	01:21–01:35	4.59 mi (7.39 km)	400 yd (370 m)	A large radio tower was blown down, and there was extensive tree damage.
EF3	NNE of Brooksville to Albertville to NNW of Fort Paine	Blount, Marshall, DeKalb	AL	34.1917°N 86.4146°W	02:59–04:10	39.86 mi (64.15 km)	1,320 yd (1,210 m)	Large wedge tornado resulted in major damage in both communities with at least 30 people injured. Albertville High School was heavily damaged, along with dozens of houses, mobile homes and several retail buildings. Thousands of trees were also damaged. Initially estimated to be two separate tornadoes but confirmed as a single long-track tornado. A total of 45 people were injured.
EF3	Parrish to NW of Sumiton to SW of Hayden	Walker, Jefferson, Blount	AL	33.7336°N 87.2864°W	03:01–03:55	29.64 mi (47.70 km)	400 yd (370 m)	Long-track tornado with extensive damage. Over 70 houses and businesses were damaged, of which one was destroyed. Hundreds of trees were also uprooted or snapped. One indirect fatality was reported from an incident after the tornado hit.
EF3	SW of Mentone, AL to NW of Trion, GA	DeKalb (AL), Chattooga (GA)	AL, GA	34.5256°N 85.5888°W	04:28–04:46	14.35 mi (23.09 km)	440 yd (400 m)	A trailer park was hard hit where several manufactured homes were flattened in DeKalb County. It then crossed into Georgia, where 8 homes were damaged, and multiple garages, a carport, and a storage space were destroyed. Multiple planes and a hangar were also damaged or destroyed in an airport strip, and multiple trees were downed or uprooted before it dissipated.

== April 25 event ==
List of confirmed tornadoes – Sunday, April 25, 2010
EF#	Location	County / Parish	State	Start Coord.	Time (UTC)	Path length	Max width	Summary
EF4	W of Crossville to N of Collinsville to E of Dogtown	DeKalb	AL	34.2203°N 85.9602°W	05:01–05:29	16.62 mi (26.75 km)	880 yd (800 m)	A two-story house and a church were flattened. Numerous other houses and manufactured homes were damaged or destroyed and trees were debarked northeast of Collinsville. Further down the path, the tornado produced heavy structural damage just west of AL 176, before eventually dissipating. Initially rated EF3 but upgraded after re-analysis. 5 people were injured.
EF2	Vonore area	Monroe, Loudon, Blount	TN	35.5689°N 84.2829°W	05:50–06:09	14 mi (23 km)	100 yd (91 m)	Several houses were damaged, along with an industrial plant.
EF0	E of Postelle	Polk	TN	35.0638°N 84.4753°W	06:05–06:12	1.24 mi (2.00 km)	30 yd (27 m)	A few trees were snapped and twisted.
EF1	N of Hayesville	Clay	NC	35.08°N 83.82°W	07:00–07:05	1.5 mi (2.4 km)	60 yd (55 m)	Minor damage in the area.
EF2	Darlington area (1st tornado)	Darlington	SC	34.267°N 80.029°W	23:40–23:43	0.63 mi (1.01 km)	50 yd (46 m)	One house, a large steel building, a barn, a workshop and three mobile homes were destroyed. Numerous other houses were damaged, along with a church, a bank and a school. Three people were injured.
EF2	Darlington area (2nd tornado)	Darlington	SC	34.283°N 79.907°W	23:45–23:57	2.99 mi (4.81 km)	75 yd (69 m)	A school was heavily damaged along with numerous houses and businesses by this slow moving, strong tornado.
EF0	Zebulon area	Wake, Franklin	NC	35.8303°N 78.3232°W	23:59–00:06	3.87 mi (6.23 km)	75 yd (69 m)	Minor damage in a commercial area to a shopping center and a fast-food restaurant.
EF1	SSW of Mechanicsville	Darlington	SC	34.303°N 79.769°W	00:08–00:09	0.06 mi (0.097 km)	50 yd (46 m)	Several large hardwood trees were snapped.

== See also ==
- Weather of 2010
- List of North American tornadoes and tornado outbreaks
- List of F4 and EF4 tornadoes
  - List of F4 and EF4 tornadoes (2010–2019)
