= Brock Colvin =

American politician (born c. 1995)

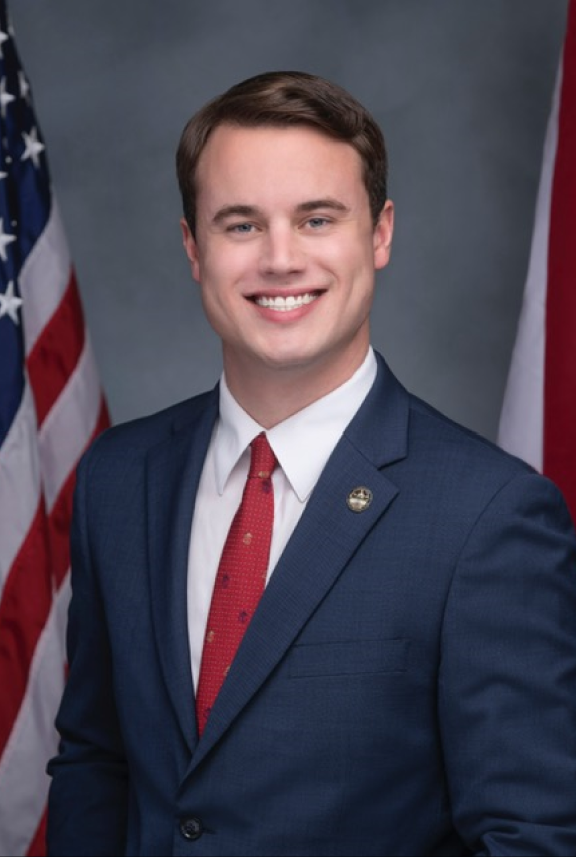

Member of the Alabama House of Representatives from the 26th district
- Incumbent
- Assumed office November 9, 2022
- Preceded by: Kerry Rich

Personal details
- Born: c.1995 (age 30–31) Albertville, Alabama, U.S.
- Party: Republican
- Education: Bachelor of Business Administration, Associate degree
- Alma mater: Snead State Community College; University of Alabama
- Profession: Financial planner

Brock Colvin (born c. 1995) is an American politician who serves as a Republican member of the Alabama House of Representatives since November 8, 2022. He represents Alabama's 26th House district.

== Biography ==
Colvin graduated from Albertville High School in 2014. He graduated from Snead State Community College in 2016, and from University of Alabama in 2019. Colvin played baseball for Snead State as a pitcher. In the 2018 legislative session, he interned under Arthur Orr and Clay Scofield.

== Electoral history ==
Colvin was elected on November 8, 2022, in the 2022 Alabama House of Representatives election against Democratic opponent Ben Alford. He assumed office the next day on November 9, 2022. In his first term, he was the youngest member in the legislature at the age of 27.

Alabama House of Representatives
Preceded by Kerry Rich	Member of the Alabama House of Representatives; 2022–present	Succeeded by incumbent
