= Hotel Thompson =

Hotel Thompson may refer to:

- Hotel Thompson (Arab, Alabama), formerly listed on the National Register of Historic Places in Marshall County, Alabama
- Hotel Thompson (Worthington, Minnesota), listed on the National Register of Historic Places in Nobles County, Minnesota
- Dr. Thompson's Hotel, the Hotel Atlanta, in antebellum Atlanta, Georgia
