= Old Rock School =

Old Rock School may refer to:

- Old Rock School (Guntersville, Alabama), listed on the National Register of Historic Places (NRHP)
- Old Rock School (Dodgeville, Wisconsin), listed on NRHP
- Old Rock School (Prairie du Chien, Wisconsin), listed on the NRHP

== See also ==
- School of Rock (disambiguation)
