= Susan Story =

American utility executive (born 1960)

CEO of American Water Works
- In office 2014–2020

Personal details
- Born: 1960 (age 65–66)
- Education: Auburn University; University of Alabama at Birmingham (MBA)
- Occupation: Utility executive

Susan N. Story (born 1960) is an American utility executive, who was chief executive officer of American Water from 2014 until 2020.

Story grew up in Albertville, Alabama. Her parents worked at a cotton mill, and her father later became a pipe fitter. She was senior class president in high school, then worked her way through college, where she earned a bachelor's degree in industrial engineering at Auburn University, and an MBA from the University of Alabama at Birmingham.

She began her career as a nuclear power plant engineer at Southern Company, eventually serving as a Southern executive vice president and as the CEO of Southern subsidiary Gulf Power Company. Story became CFO of American Water in 2013, and was named CEO in 2014.
