= Albertville Regional Airport =

Airport in Alabama, United States

Albertville Regional Airport Thomas J. Brumlik Field
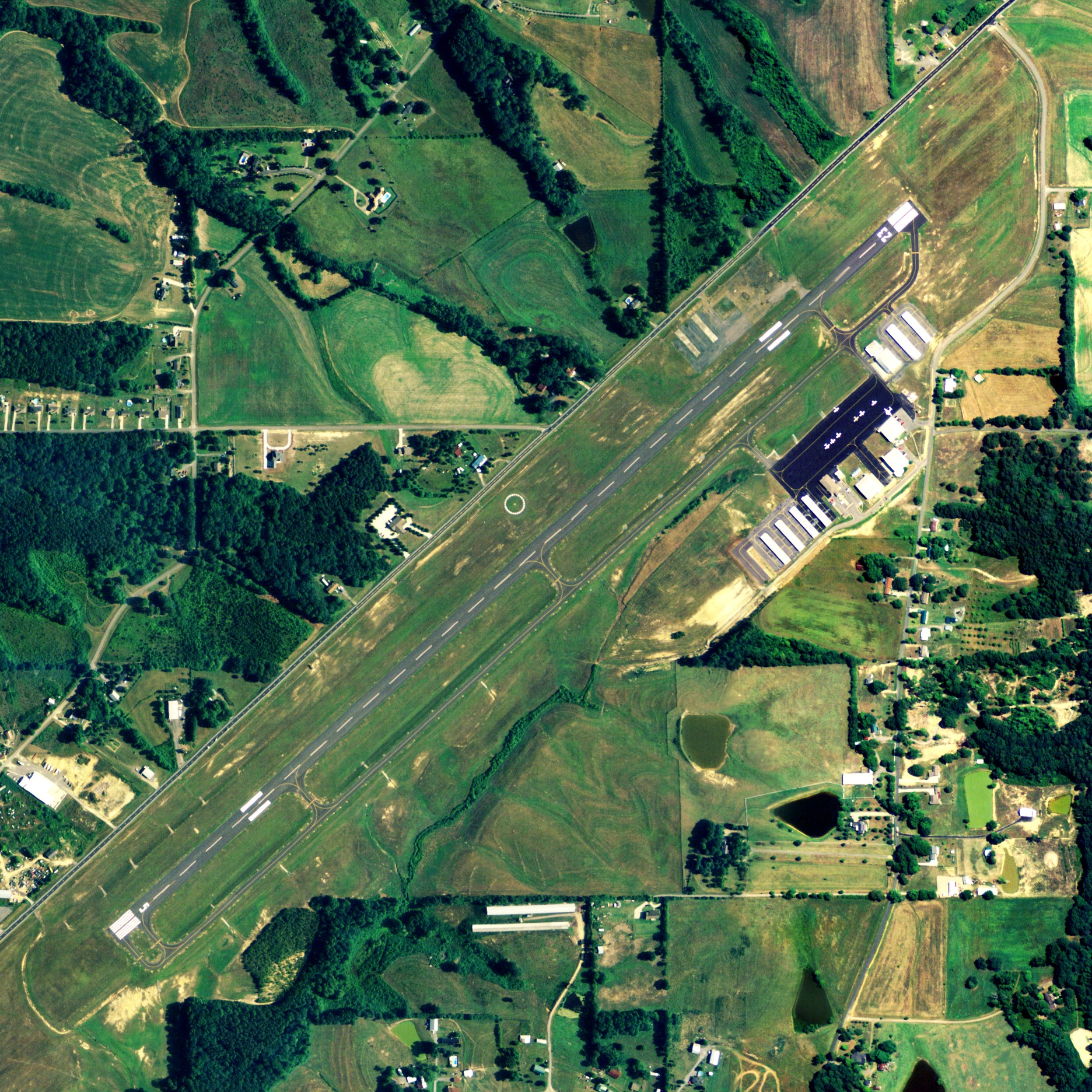
- NAIP aerial image, 21 June 2006
- IATA: none; ICAO: none; FAA LID: 8A0

Summary
- Airport type: Public
- Owner: City of Albertville
- Serves: Albertville, Alabama
- Elevation AMSL: 1,032 ft (315 m)
- Coordinates: 34°13′45″N 086°15′21″W
- Interactive map of Albertville Regional Airport

Runways
Direction	Length		Surface
Direction	ft	m	Surface
5/23	6,114	1,864	Asphalt

Statistics (2020)
- Aircraft operations (year ending 6/1/2020): 25,400
- Based aircraft: 46
- Source: Federal Aviation Administration

Albertville Regional Airport (FAA LID: 8A0), also known as Thomas J. Brumlik Field, is a city-owned, public-use airport located three nautical miles (5 km) southwest of the central business district of Albertville, in Marshall County, Alabama, United States. It was formerly known as Albertville Municipal Airport.

This airport is included in the FAA's National Plan of Integrated Airport Systems for 2011–2015 and 2009–2013, both of which categorized it as a general aviation facility.

== History ==
Albertville Municipal Airport was activated by the FAA in July 1962.

== Facilities and aircraft ==
The airport covers an area of 77 acres (31 ha) at an elevation of 1,032 feet (315 m) above mean sea level. It contains a single asphalt runway, 5/23, measuring 6,114 by 100 feet (1,864 by 30 m). Its markings are meant for non-precision flying.

For the 12-month period ending June 1, 2020, the airport had 25,400 aircraft operations, an average of 70 per day: 22% local general aviation and 78% itinerant general aviation. At that time there were 46 aircraft based at this airport: 34 single-engine, 6 multi-engine, and 6 jet.

== See also ==
- List of airports in Alabama
