= Albertville City Schools =

School district in Alabama, United States

Address
- 8379 US Highway 431 Albertville, Marshall County, AL, 35950; United States

District information
- Type: Public
- Grades: PK-12
- Established: 1985; 41 years ago
- President: Mr. Bobby Stewart
- Vice-president: Ms. Sandy Elkins
- Superintendent: Dr. Bart Reeves
- Schools: 6
- NCES District ID: 0100005

Students and staff
- Students: 5,842 ^{('20-'21)}
- Teachers: 301.50 ^{('20-'21)}
- Staff: 155.42 ^{('20-'21)}
- Student–teacher ratio: 19.38 ^{('20-'21)}

Other information
- Website: Official website

The Albertville City Schools or Albertville City School System is the public school district of Albertville, Alabama. Albertville City School System serves 5,842 students and employs 302 teachers and 155 staff as of the 2020-2021 school year. The district includes three elementary schools, two middle schools, and one high school.

== Schools ==
The Albertville City School System consists of six schools:

- Albertville Kindergarten and Pre-K (PK-K)
- Albertville Primary School (1-2)
- Albertville Elementary School (3-4)
- Albertville Intermediate School (5-6)
- Albertville Middle School (7-8)
- Albertville High School (9-12)

== School Board ==
Name	Position
Mr. Bobby Stewart	President
Mrs. Sandy Elkins	Vice-President
Mrs. Annie Furrer	Member
Mrs. John Gladden	Member
Dr. Melissa McKee	Member
