= School of Rock (disambiguation) =

School of Rock is a 2003 American musical comedy film starring Jack Black.

School of Rock may also refer to:

- School of Rock (company), a performance-based music program for those between the ages of 8 and 18
- School of Rock (soundtrack), the soundtrack album of the film
- School of Rock (musical), a 2015 musical based on the film
- School of Rock (TV series), an American musical comedy series also based on the film

== See also ==
- Rock School, a British reality television series starring Gene Simmons
- Rock School (film), a 2005 documentary about The Paul Green School of Rock Music
- Rockschool, an educational TV program featuring Herbie Hancock
- Old Rock School (disambiguation)
- Schoolhouse Rock!, a series of animated musical educational short films
- Rock 'n' Roll High School (disambiguation)
- "School of Rock 'n Roll", a 1958 song by Gene Summers
