= Charles Russell Hardman =

American painter

Charles Russell Hardman was an American artist from Florida. He painted works in U.S. Post Offices under a Treasury Department program. His "Indians Receiving Gifts" mural is at the Guntersville Post Office in Guntersville, Alabama. His "Episodes from the History of Florida" (1940) oil on canvas was painted for the Miami Beach Branch Post Office.
