= Kerry Rich =

American politician

Member of the Alabama House of Representatives from the 26th district
- In office November 3, 2010 – November 9, 2022
- Preceded by: W.F. (Frank) McDaniel
- Succeeded by: Brock Colvin

Personal details
- Born: Kerry Galen Rich; June 25, 1951 (age 75)
- Party: Republican
- Profession: Broadcaster

Kerry Galen Rich (born c. 1951) is an American politician. He was a member of the Alabama House of Representatives from the 26th District, serving from 2010 to 2022. A member of the Republican party, he also served in the House from 1974 to 1978 and 1990 to 1994. He manages a radio station in Guntersville, Alabama.
