= Tornado outbreak of April 22–25, 2010 =

Tornado outbreak in the United States

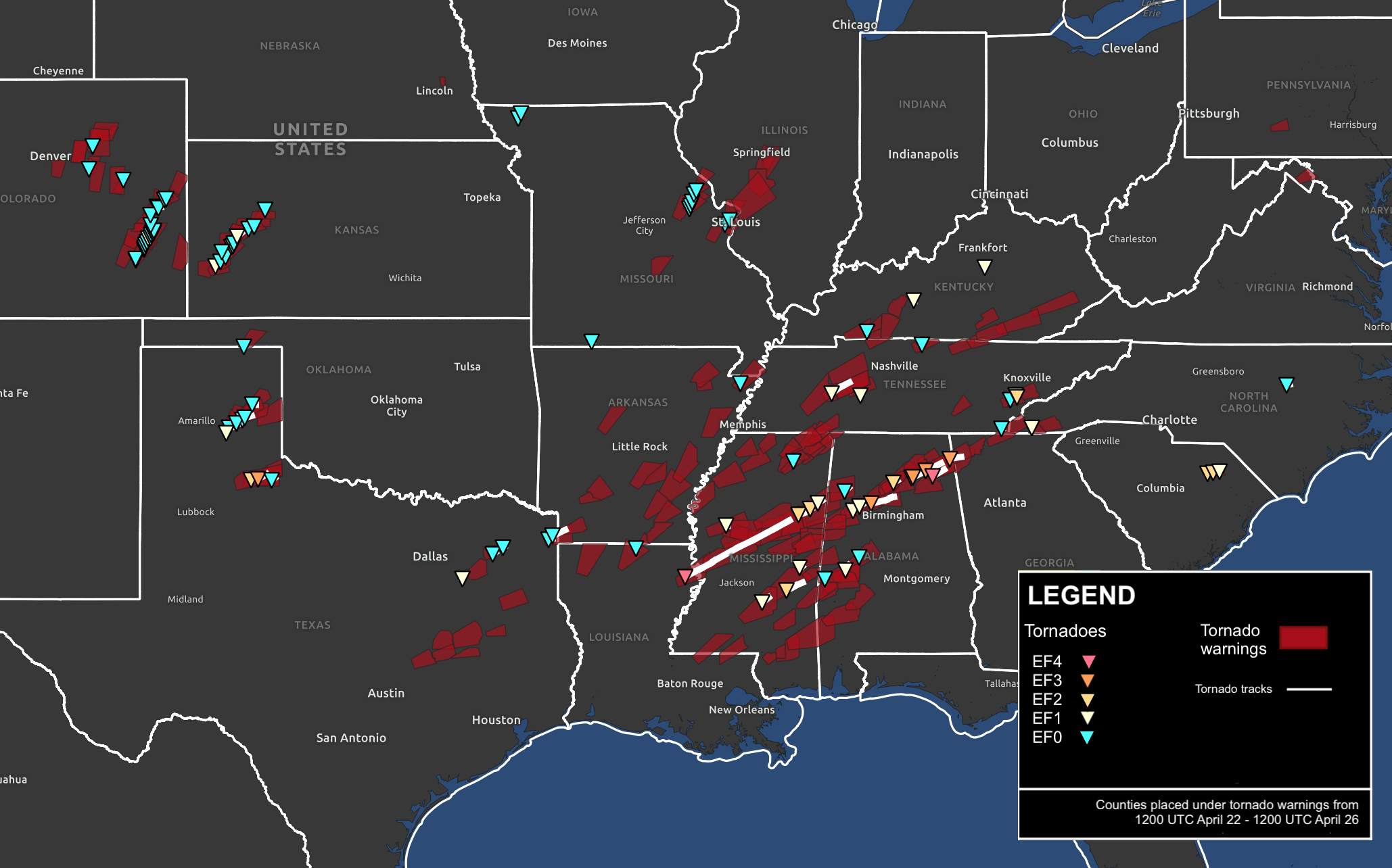
- Tornado warnings and confirmed tornadoes on April 22–25

Meteorological history
- Duration: April 22–25, 2010

Tornado outbreak
- Tornadoes: 88
- Max. rating: EF4 tornado
- Duration: 77 hours, 3 minutes
- Highest winds: Tornadic – 170 mph (270 km/h) (Yazoo City, MS EF4 on April 24, Collinsville, AL EF4 on April 25)
- Highest gusts: Non-tornadic – 88 mph (142 km/h) in Enid, Oklahoma on April 22
- Largest hail: 4.00 inches (10.2 cm) in Cameron, Texas

Extratropical cyclone
- Lowest pressure: 981 hPa (mbar); 28.97 inHg

Overall effects
- Fatalities: 10
- Injuries: 184
- Damage: $425 million (2010 USD)
- Areas affected: High Plains, Southern United States
- Part of the tornado outbreaks of 2010

A multi-day and deadly tornado outbreak occurred across a large portion of the Southern United States, originally starting in the High Plains on April 22, 2010, and continuing through the Southern Plains on April 23, and the Mississippi and Tennessee Valleys on April 24. The most severe activity was on April 24, particularly in Mississippi. The outbreak was responsible for ten tornado-related fatalities on April 24, all in Mississippi from a single supercell that crossed the entire state.

A high risk of severe weather had been issued for April 24. High risk days are rarely issued. Four "particularly dangerous situation" tornado watches were issued that day for areas of Missouri, Kentucky, Illinois, Arkansas, Louisiana, Mississippi, Tennessee, and Alabama. Numerous tornado warnings citing "large and extremely dangerous" tornadoes were issued. A tornado emergency was issued for central Mississippi for a tornado that reportedly flattened 30 homes near Eagle Bend in Warren County, leveled numerous buildings, injured numerous people, and destroyed a church with Yazoo City. The 165 mile long wedge (at peak as wide as 1.75 miles) was rated EF4. Ten people were killed, including four in Yazoo County, one in Holmes County, and five in Choctaw County. Significant damage to an industrial plant with injuries, trapped people and destroyed homes were reported in Madison Parish, Louisiana, near the Louisiana-Mississippi state line. Seventy-seven tornadoes were reported that day.

Dr. Greg Forbes of the Weather Channel said that the radar was picking up debris on a thunderstorm near Yazoo City, indicating extreme damage. He said he has not seen anything like that since a tornado hit Greensburg, Kansas. The National Weather Service also confirmed two tornado touchdowns in the St. Louis, Missouri, area on April 24, 2010, both were rated as EF0 with the strongest winds recorded at 85 mph. One touchdown was in the Des Peres area while the other touched down in the University City area. No injuries were reported from the tornadoes. The tornadoes knocked down some power lines and trees and caused mostly minor damages to homes and businesses.

== Meteorological synopsis ==
=== April 22–23 ===
A complex weather system began to track across the central and southern United States beginning on April 22. Scattered thunderstorms initially developed across the central and eastern Great Plains region late during the afternoon and then moved into the southeast Texas Panhandle and the Osage Plains during the evening and overnight hours. Large hail occurred with the stronger storms, but the most severe storms produced damaging winds and tornadoes. By late evening, new activity developed into a line of storms which swept through the Osage Plains. Many tornadoes were produced in southeastern Colorado, but they occurred over open fields and did not cause a significant amount of damage. However, one tornado in south central Kiowa County destroyed a small (15-foot x 30-foot) barn. In Kansas, numerous tornado-producing storms caused damage across a number of southwest Kansas counties. The public first reported a mile-wide tornado at around 4:40 pm west of Lakin. The storm tracked two miles southwest of Lakin at about 5:10 pm and was spotted again six miles northwest of Deerfield at approximately 5:40 pm. A tornadic storm in Kearny County uprooted trees and caused power outages at residences west of Lakin. No injuries were reported from it. In Finney County, no damage or injuries were reported from tornadic activity that traveled mostly above open farmland. In Scott County, a tornado was spotted four miles south of Scott City at about 7:10 p.m. Grain bins near Scott City were damaged, a barn partially collapsed with part of its roof torn off and some trees and power lines were reported down from it. The strongest tornado in Kansas occurred in Kearny County and was rated EF2. There were numerous tornadoes in the Texas Panhandle and one tornado in the Oklahoma Panhandle, which included one that was rated EF3 in Cottle County, Texas.

On April 23, an upper level storm system increased in strength as it moved from the southern Rockies to the southern Great Plains region. A cold front moved across east-central Texas, eastern Oklahoma, and the Missouri River Valley through the night. Moist air ahead of the cold front in the south central states allowed for strong to severe thunderstorms to develop across the Mississippi Valley. A moderate risk of severe weather was issued across the Ark-La-Tex region and lower Mississippi Valley. There were five EF0 tornadoes in east Texas and southwest Arkansas during the late night and into the early morning of April 24. One tornado in Missouri traveled for 22 miles (35 km), but did not cause any significant damage.

=== April 24 ===
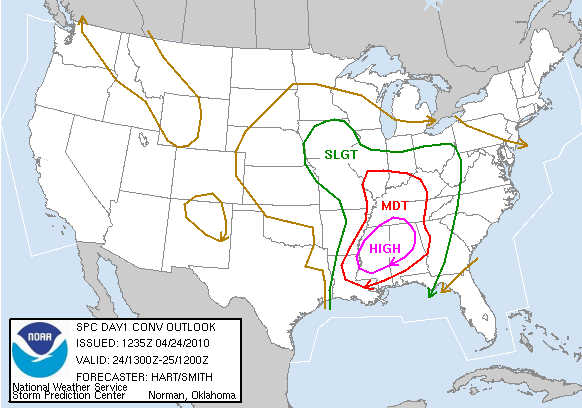
Storm Prediction Center risk map for severe thunderstorms on April 24, 2010. The high risk was later expanded northward.

On April 24, an energetic upper level storm system strengthened as it moved from Texas to the southern Great Lakes Region. A cold front moved eastward across the middle and lower Mississippi River Valley before heading into the Ohio River Valley and stretched into the Mid-South portion of the United States. In front of the cold front, a warm, moist and unstable air mass spread northward from the lower Mississippi River Valley and northern Gulf Coast States into the middle Mississippi and Ohio River Valleys. There were already thunderstorms that had formed during the morning hours and the conditions would only become more numerous throughout the day. This set the stage for a significant severe weather outbreak with the potential for strong and violent tornadoes, large hail, and damaging winds. As a result, the Storm Prediction Center issued a rare high risk of severe weather for portions of Mississippi, Alabama, Tennessee, and Kentucky, the first such issuance since April 26, 2009. Four "particularly dangerous situation" tornado watches were issued that day for areas of Missouri, Kentucky, Illinois, Arkansas, Louisiana, Mississippi, Tennessee, and Alabama. The outbreak of severe weather caused NASCAR to call off the Aaron's 312 race in Talladega, Alabama. In Tennessee, there were three EF1 tornadoes and an EF0 tornado on April 24, and an EF2 early on April 25. The EF2 struck after 2 a.m. and caused damage in three counties. Despite extensive structural damage, there were no injuries.

Alabama was hard hit by tornadoes on this day. An EF4 tornado struck southeastern DeKalb County in the Mount Vernon area. The most serious damage occurred near the intersection of County Roads 80 and 55, where a church and a two-story home were destroyed. Several mobile homes were destroyed and numerous large trees were snapped or uprooted. Five injuries occurred from this tornado. An EF3 tornado touched down in south Albertville. Throughout the event, the tornado skipped and hit other places along its path from Marshall County to Geraldine in DeKalb County. The first damage reports came in at around 10:15 p.m. The storm left the downtown area of Albertville in complete destruction, then downed trees and power lines in DeKalb County. Fifty-nine homes in Albertville were destroyed by the tornado. Another 198 had major damage while 157 had minor damage – a total of 414 homes impacted by the storm. It also caused damage to the middle and high school in Albertville. Another EF3 tornado touched down in Parrish and tracked through Cordova and Corner. Significant damage to buildings occurred in Parrish and Cordova, while Corner and Blount County primarily suffered uprooted or broken trees, with at least one travel trailer overturned and some minor structural damage. Arkadelphia Road near Skyline Road was blocked for a time by fallen trees and debris. A total of 70 to 80 homes and businesses sustained damage from the tornado. A third EF3 tornado in Alabama struck a trailer park in Mentone. The tornado destroyed nine of the 11 manufactured homes in the park. Seven people were injured from it.

The severe weather and tornadoes also wreaked havoc across Mississippi. Near Starkville, an EF2 tornado destroyed an unoccupied mobile home and damaged 20 homes, as well as snapping and uprooting numerous trees, damaging a barn and snapped three power poles. Ten people were killed and 146 others were injured when an EF4 tornado, which started in Louisiana, tore through the state of Mississippi. An EF2 tornado that moved over Jasper and Lauderdale counties caused significant structural damage to a church and destroyed an outbuilding. An EF1 tornado that moved over Lauderdale and Kemper counties damaged or destroyed four barns and destroyed one shed. In all, 319 homes were damaged in Yazoo County; 114 in Choctaw County; 60 in Holmes County; 48 homes and three businesses were damaged in Monroe County; 63 homes damaged in Union County; 42 homes damaged in Warren County; and 35 homes damaged in Attala County.

== Confirmed tornadoes ==
Confirmed tornadoes by Enhanced Fujita rating
EFU	EF0	EF1	EF2	EF3	EF4	EF5	Total
0	56	17	9	4	2	0	88

=== Tallulah, Louisiana/Yazoo City–Durant, Mississippi ===
Tallulah, Louisiana/Yazoo City–Durant, Mississippi
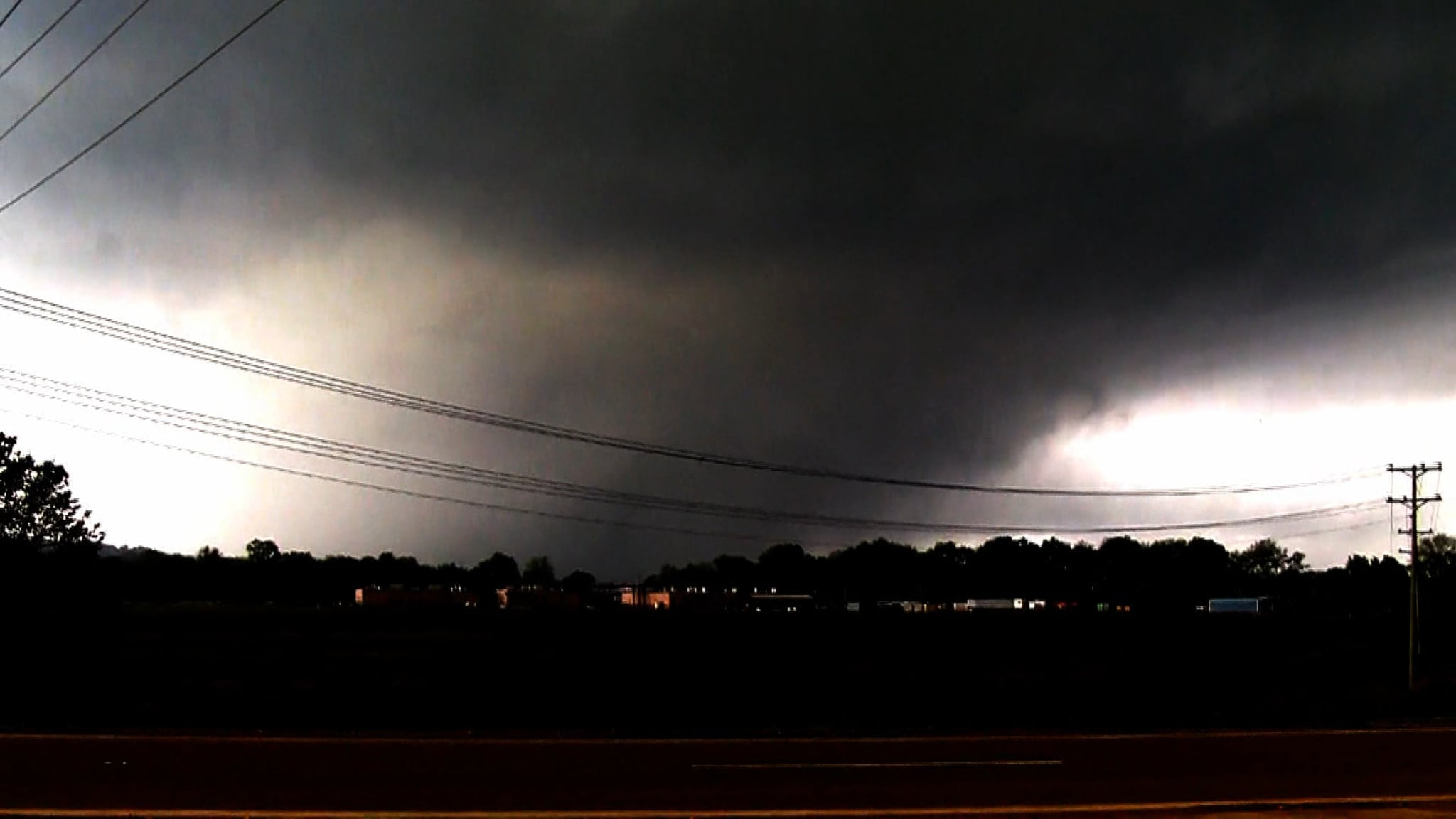
- The tornado taken on approach to Yazoo City

Meteorological history
- Formed: April 24, 2010, 10:09 a.m. CST (UTC–05:00)
- Dissipated: April 24, 2010, 12:53 p.m. CST (UTC–05:00)
- Duration: 2 hours, 44 minutes

EF4 tornado
- on the Enhanced Fujita scale
- Highest winds: 170 mph (270 km/h)

Overall effects
- Casualties: 10 fatalities, 146 injuries
- Damage: $364 million (2010 USD)

This massive and deadly tornado, the most powerful and destructive of the entire outbreak, cultivated over northern Louisiana during the late morning hours of April 24. The tornado became strong almost immediately, bending and destroying several high-tension power poles west of Tallulah. The tornado then crossed I-20, blowing an 18-wheeler off the road. As the tornado passed northwest and north of Tallulah, it heavily damaged or destroyed a number of homes. Before crossing the Mississippi River, it caused near-total destruction of a chemical plant near the Omega community. It crossed the Mississippi River shortly thereafter, and damaged or destroyed numerous homes on the north side of Eagle Lake. The tornado then moved across the Delta National Forest in Issaquena and Sharkey Counties, causing major tree damage. The tornado again caused significant home damage northwest of Satartia, and again as it crossed MS 3 near the Crupp community. The tornado then moved through rural areas southwest of Yazoo City, causing major damage or total destruction of a number of homes, as well as intense tree damage. The tornado was also rain-wrapped at times when about to go near the southwestern sections of Yazoo City. As the tornado approached the intersection of US 49 and MS 16 on the south side of Yazoo City, it reached its widest point and maximum intensity. Several buildings, including a church and several businesses, were totally destroyed or even swept away, with little debris left in the lots. The tornado continued moving through residential areas on the southeast side of Yazoo City, heavily damaging or demolishing numerous homes. The tornado continued northeast through rural eastern Yazoo and southern Holmes Counties, causing intense tree damage and damaging or destroying a number of rural residences. Whole swaths of trees were mowed down, with intense debarking and denuding observed. As the tornado moved by the Franklin community in rural Holmes County, it again reached EF4 intensity as it completely destroyed two brick homes and heavily damaged or destroyed a number of other homes.

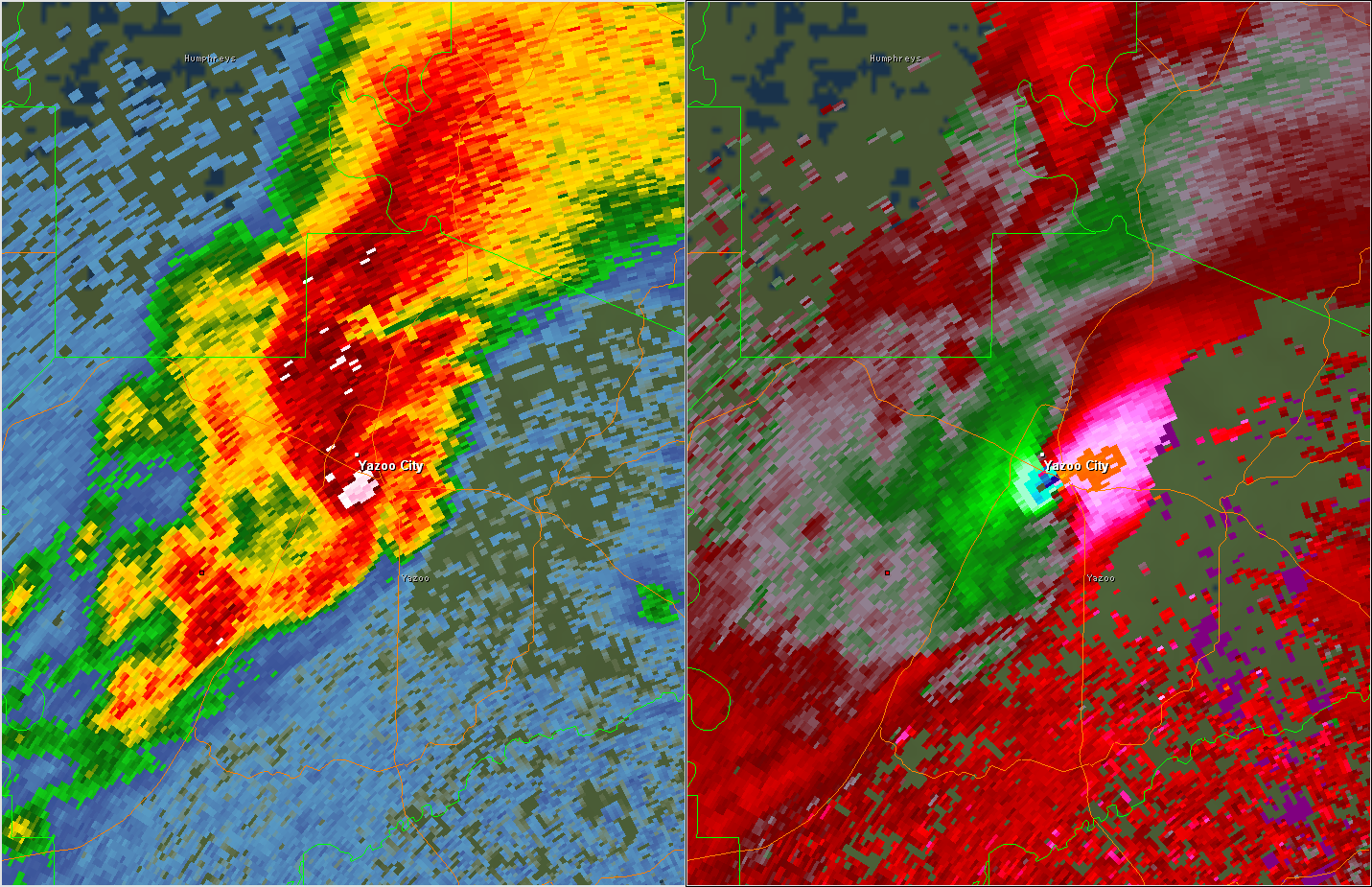
Doppler radar images of the tornadic supercell as the tornado hit Yazoo City. 0.5-degree elevation, base reflectivity on the left, storm relative velocity on the right. Note the visible "debris ball" just southeast of Yazoo City on the reflectivity display.

The tornado then crossed I-55, causing significant tree damage and blowing a number of vehicles off the road. As the tornado approached the area just south of Durant and crossed US 51, it narrowed and reached one of its weaker points in its track, but was still on the ground. However, shortly thereafter it re-intensified somewhat and began causing significant tree damage in rural western Attala County. The tornado continued across northern Attala County, causing tree damage and heavily damaging a number of rural residences, including in the community of Hesterville. The tornado intensified further as it crossed the Natchez Trace Parkway, and once again produced high-end EF3 damage as it passed northwest of Weir. Numerous homes were heavily damaged or destroyed in this area. The tornado maintained strong intensity as it crossed the remainder of Choctaw County, including damaging a number of homes as it crossed MS 415, MS 9, and MS 15. The tornado rapidly narrowed and weakened as it crossed into Oktibbeha County, and dissipated north of the town of Sturgis after being on the ground for nearly three hours.

The tornado tracked 149.25 miles (240.19 km), making it the fourth longest in Mississippi history. The tornado was up to 1.75 miles (2.82 km) wide at its widest point, making it the largest tornado ever in Mississippi at the time (it has since been surpassed by the 2.25-mile-wide (3.62 km) Bassfield, Mississippi EF4 tornado on April 12, 2020). The 10 fatalities and 146 injuries made it Mississippi's ninth deadliest tornado since 1900. The tornado was rated as an EF4, producing its most severe damage in Yazoo and Holmes Counties. The tornado's wind speed peaked at 170 miles per hour (270 km/h). It was the state's worst natural disaster since Hurricane Katrina in 2005. At first believed to be two separate tornadoes, because of the lesser extent of the damage near Durant, it was later confirmed to be one continuous tornado. As such, it stood for nearly 12 years as the longest continuous track for any tornado in the modern NEXRAD radar era, before another deadly, violent tornado occurred on December 10, 2021, wreaking havoc across Northern Tennessee, and Western Kentucky.

== Aftermath ==
=== Federal response ===
Governor of Mississippi, Haley Barbour, declared a state of emergency for the areas impacted by the tornado across seven counties. Spokesman for the Mississippi Emergency Management Agency (MEMA), Greg Flynn, claimed that the death toll for the tornado could have been higher if not for the vigil warning by the National Weather Service and improved response systems imposed after Hurricane Katrina. Governor of Louisiana, Bobby Jindal, declared a state of emergency for Madison Parish, with him expected to meet with the sheriff and other officials in the parish. Barbour visited parts of Yazoo County that were devastated and was interviewed by the Associated Press, stating parts of the county that were struck experienced "utter obliteration", with the destruction reminding him of Katrina. Later he recounted, "The effects of these storms have left many Mississippians with destroyed businesses and without homes", with Barbour ordering state flags to be flown at half-staff beginning Tuesday, April 27, to Friday, April 30 during the mourning period.

On April 29, President Barack Obama declared a federal disaster for Mississippi, allocating federal aid to support state and local recovery efforts to the areas affected by the tornado, opening federal funding to people in several counties, including Attala, Choctaw, Holmes, Warren, and Yazoo Counties. Federal funding was also available for state and local governments and certain private nonprofit organizations in Yazoo and Choctaw counties to use for debris removal and for the state to use for 72 hours to choose emergency protective measures. The declaration also noted that FEMA was continuing with damage surveying in other areas, with the expectations that more counties and additional forms of assistance were likely after the surveying was completed.

=== Recovery efforts ===
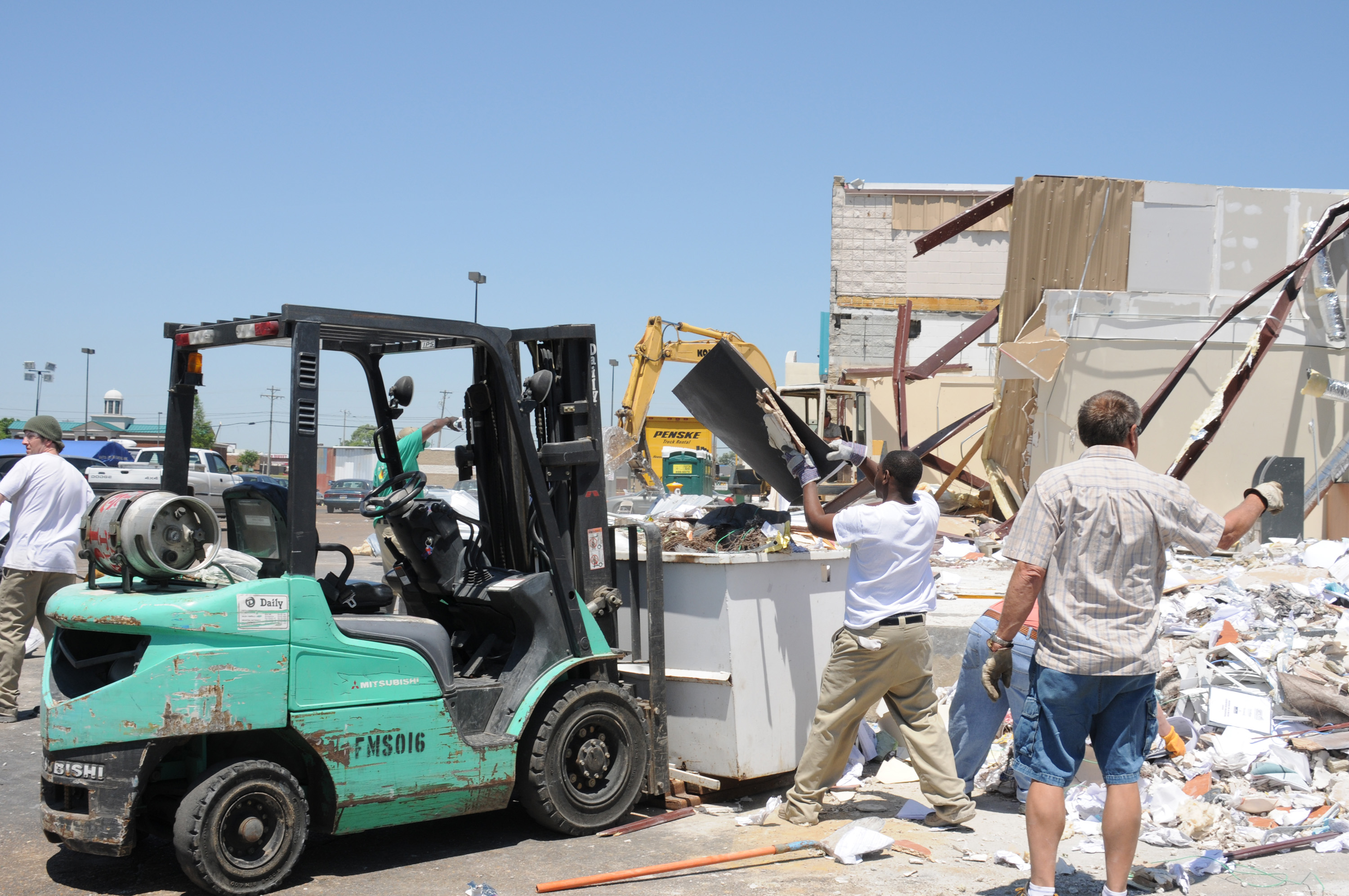
Clean up efforts at a destroyed supermarket in Yazoo City on April 29

Rescuers initially struggled to enter Yazoo County due to geographical challenges, with the county being located on a more difficult and hilly terrain that runs along this section of the Mississippi Delta, with some rescuers resorting to off-road vehicles to reach victims, according to the governor spokesperson. Helicopters were overhead to assess the damage as rapid response teams searched for victims. American Medical Response continued their operations in other parts of Mississippi, dispatching ambulances to affected areas, with injuries ranged from minor to severe, according to an American Medical Response spokesman. The Rankin County Emergency Management Agency dispatched a bus that was converted to a multi-patient ambulance. American Medical Response of Central Mississippi established a triage center in Yazoo City, with the spokesperson for American Medical Response reporting that patients had to be brought out on four-wheelers due to debris from trees and structures making travel difficult. 11 ambulances were provided to the city, one person with severe injuries were airlifted to a hospital in Jackson, and four people were transported by ambulance to different hospitals. 80 Mississippi National Guard soldiers were dispatched, with an additional 40 Highway Patrol officers deployed across areas affected by the tornado, with state troopers and other law enforcement officers joining to help.

State officials established at the Mississippi State Fair to receive donated bottled water and imperishable food for the relief effort. 14 deputy fire marshals were deployed to disaster zones over the weekend to watch out for looters, though there was only minor cases of looting in Holmes County. In Hinds County, the sheriff department set up a semi-truck to accept imperishable food, water bottles, clothing, beds and other essentials to assist in the relief efforts for tornado victims. The sheriff department also announced they've sent out two dozen deputies and 100 inmates to help clear debris in Yazoo County in response to the tornado. On April 26, Firefighters from Columbus Fire Department's Task Force Two team dispatched the search and rescue team to Yazoo and Choctaw counties, with approximately 15 people assigned to the mission, determining the damage inflicted to residences and assisting in accounting for all residents in the area. MEMA offered housing to the victims who lost their homes, using cottages that were originally built for the victims of Katrina and the cottages were available for victims eligible to acquire a cottage in all the disaster-declared counties.

== See also ==
- Weather of 2010
- List of North American tornadoes and tornado outbreaks
- List of F4 and EF4 tornadoes
  - List of F4 and EF4 tornadoes (2010–2019)
