= Albertville station (Alabama) =

- Albertville Depot
- U.S. National Register of Historic Places
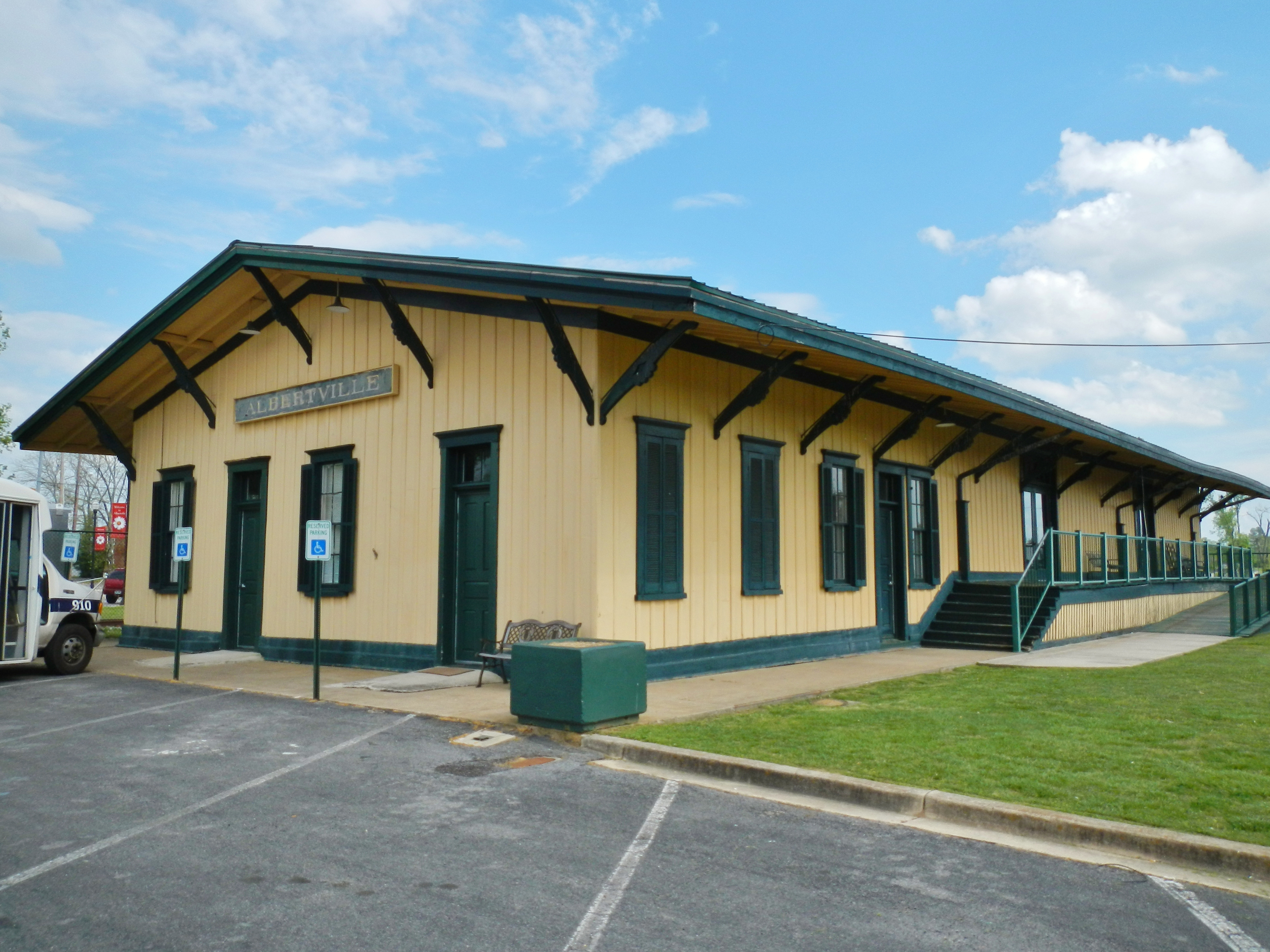

- Location within Alabama Location within the United States
- Location: E. Main St., Albertville, Alabama
- Coordinates: 34°16′0″N 86°12′22″W
- Area: less than one acre
- Built: 1892
- NRHP reference No.: 75000320
- Added to NRHP: February 20, 1975

The Albertville Depot, also known as L&N Railroad Depot, is a historic train depot in Albertville, Alabama. It was built by the Nashville, Chattanooga and St. Louis Railway in 1892, one year after the town was incorporated. The building measures 112 by 40 feet (34 by 12 meters), and is divided into three rooms: two offices and one larger warehouse space.

The depot is one of the only structures in Albertville to survive the tornado of 1908. Passenger service ended in the 1940s, although the depot remained in use for freight. Although the NC&StL was purchased by the Louisville and Nashville Railroad in 1880, the two companies operated separately until 1957. The depot was listed on the National Register of Historic Places on February 20, 1975. The building was renovated for use as a senior center in the mid-1990s. A former L&N caboose next to the depot houses the Albertville Museum.

Preceding station	Nashville, Chattanooga and St. Louis Railway	Following station
Guntersville toward Elora	Elora-Gadsden	Boaz toward Gadsden
