= Henry House (Suamico, Wisconsin) =

Historic house in Wisconsin, United States

- U.S. National Register of Historic Places
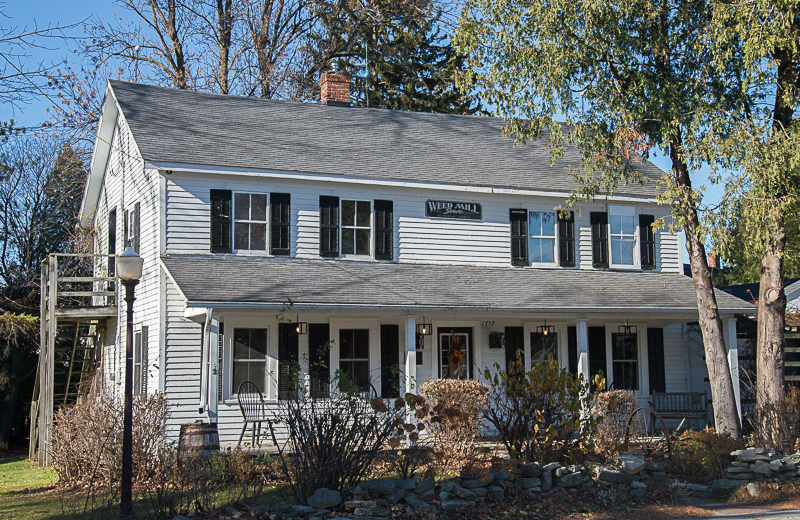
- Henry House
- Location: 1749 Riverside Dr., Suamico, Wisconsin
- Coordinates: 44°37′52″N 88°03′11″W
- Area: 0.4 acres (0.16 ha)
- Built: c.1869
- NRHP reference No.: 80000108
- Added to NRHP: January 31, 1980

The Henry House in Suamico, Wisconsin is a historic house from the "lumber era" of local history, which appears to be the only structure from that era surviving in the township.

It is a simple side-gabled boarding house built by the Weed Brothers around 1869. It has also been known as Weed Mill Inn.

It was distinctive for its interior walls and ceilings being board and batten throughout.

The house was originally built for the Weed Brothers, who used it as a boarding house. In 1871, it survived an offshoot of the Peshtigo Fire.

In 1972, husband and wife Jerry and Pat Henry bought the building and moved it to its present location. The couple did similar work with other historic structures, creating what is known as 'Historic Vickery Village' or 'The Shoppes at Vickery Village'.

The Henry House was added to the National Register of Historic Places in 1980. In 1989, it was listed on the State Register of Historic Places.
