= Albertville High School =

Public high school in Albertville, Alabama

Coordinates: 34.262316°N 86.2052556°W

Location
- 402 East McCord Avenue; Albertville, Alabama 35950; United States

Information
- Type: Public high school
- Religious affiliation: none
- School district: Albertville City Schools
- CEEB code: 010025
- Principal: Steven Hudgins
- Staff: 91.00 (FTE)
- Grades: 9-12
- Age range: 15-18
- Student to teacher ratio: 18.79
- Campus: Suburban
- Colours: Red and black
- Fight song: Victory March
- Sports: Football, Basketball, Soccer, Baseball, Softball, Volleyball, Tennis, Golf, Cheerleading, Track, Swim, Marching Band and Cross Country
- Nickname: Aggies
- Rival: Boaz High School
- Website: www.albertk12.org/ahs

Alabama Register of Landmarks and Heritage
- Designated: March 24, 1995

Albertville High School is a four-year public high school in Albertville, Alabama. It has an enrollment of 1708 students and is accredited by the Alabama State Department of Education. In 2023, 48.7% of Albertville High School students were female, and 51.2% of students were male. Albertville High School made AYP in 2007.

In 2021, Albertville High School had 31 students for every full-time equivalent teacher.

In 2023, Albertville High School had 68.87% of students were eligible for free or reduced price lunch programs.

Albertville High School sports teams are known as the Albertville Aggies, for Albertville High School was originally an agricultural school.

The Albertville High School Marching Band participated in the Rose Parade in Pasadena on January 1, 2024 and 2011, and they will also participate in 2028.

== Construction ==
The Albertville School System recently completed its campus construction after years of work. Albertville High School was provided with a new lunchroom, building, Freshman Academy, Fine Arts building, gym, and football field.

== Notable alumni ==
- Brock Colvin, member of the Alabama House of Representatives
- Rusty Greer, Former MLB player (Texas Rangers)
- John Hannah, Former (University of Alabama) player, Former NFL player (New England Patriots)
- Gene A. Smith, Director of the Center for Texas Studies at Texas Christian University
