= Guntersville Post Office =

- Guntersville Post Office Building
- U.S. National Register of Historic Places
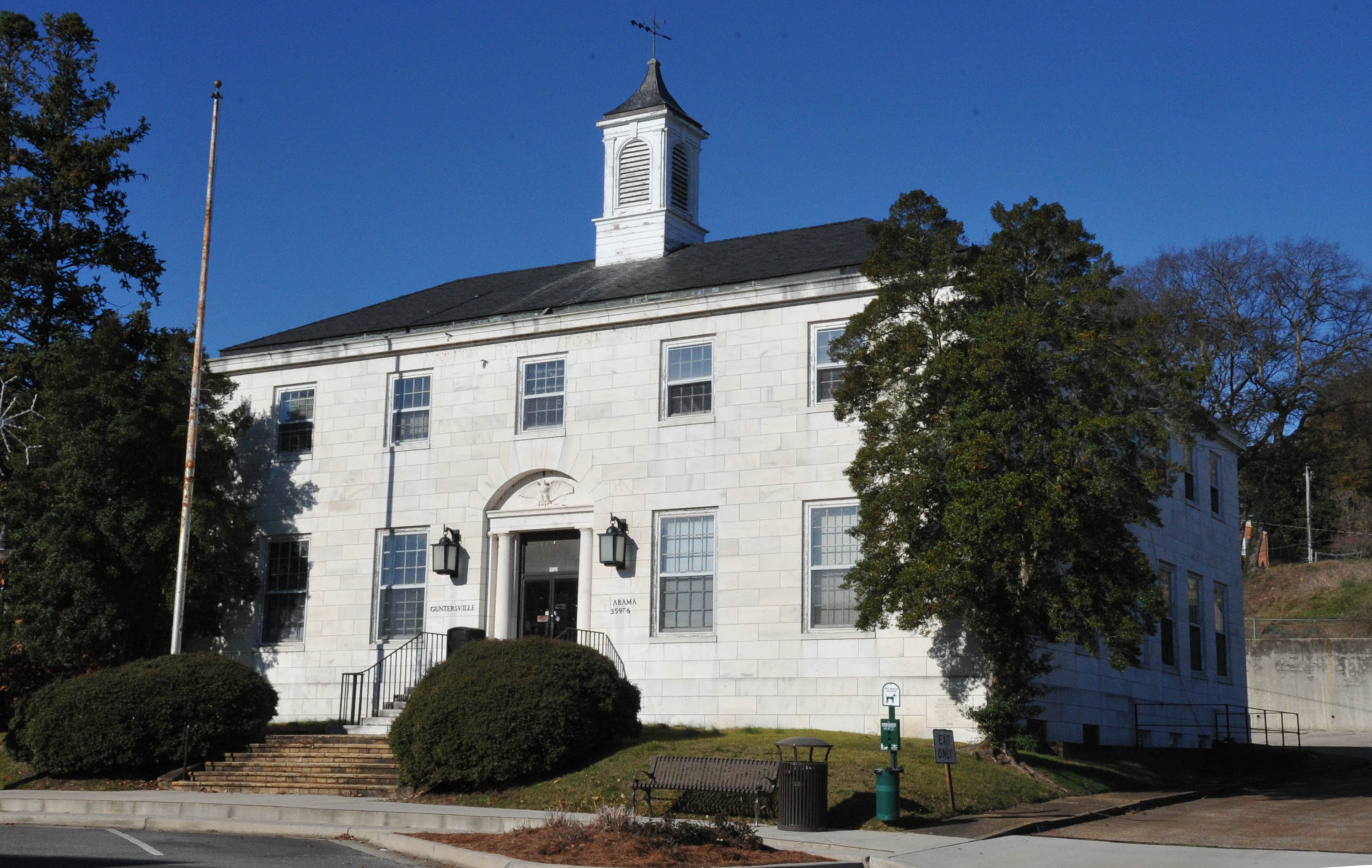
- The building in May 2008

- Location within Alabama Location within the United States
- Location: 520 Gunter Ave., Guntersville, Alabama
- Coordinates: 34°21′28″N 86°17′42″W
- Built: 1941
- NRHP reference No.: 10000558
- Added to NRHP: August 16, 2010

The Old Guntersville Post Office is a historic U.S. Post Office in Guntersville, Alabama. It was built in 1940–41 with federal Treasury Department funds in Colonial Revival style. The building houses a painting by Charles Russell Hardman. The Guntersville Post Office was added to the National Register of Historic Places on August 16, 2010.
