= Old Rock School (Guntersville, Alabama) =

- Guntersville City School
- U.S. National Register of Historic Places
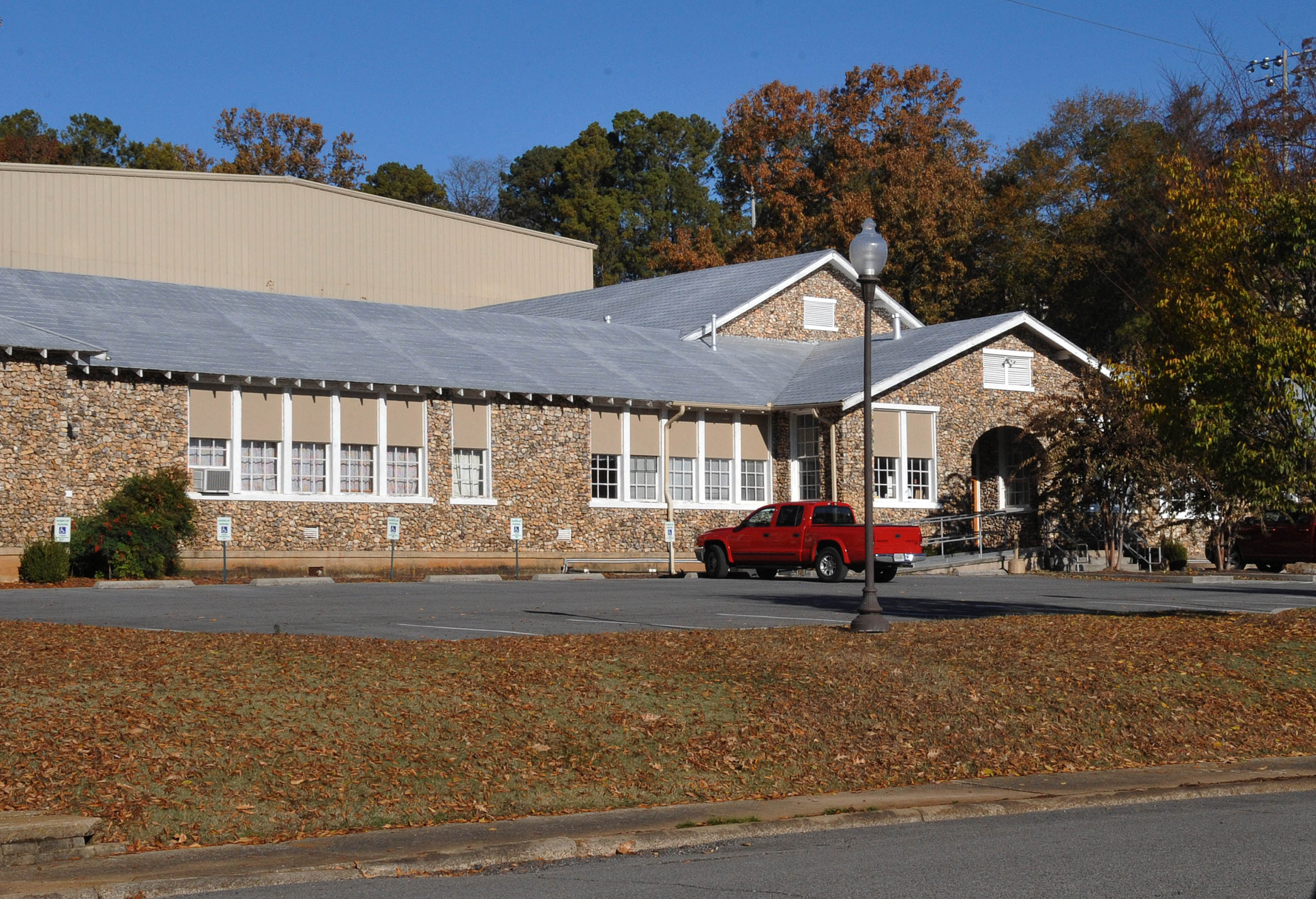
- The building in May 2008

- Location within Alabama Location within the United States
- Location: 1120 Rayburn Ave., Guntersville, Alabama
- Coordinates: 34°21′4″N 86°18′10″W
- Area: 2.5 acres (1.0 ha)
- Built: 1926
- Architect: Alred, Gus
- Architectural style: American Craftsman
- NRHP reference No.: 03001135
- Added to NRHP: November 15, 2003

The Old Rock School (also known as the Guntersville City School) is a historic building in Guntersville, Alabama. The one-story building was constructed in 1926 in a flat-figure 8 shape, with two courtyards in the middle. It was built in the American Craftsman style, with rock facing and exposed rafters tails. The school was born of Progressive Era philosophy of providing proper facilities for education, including modern plumbing, proper lighting and ventilation, and ample open space. An auditorium allowed for classes in drama and music, as well as public concerts and performances. After the school was replaced in the 1970s, several other groups utilized the building. Its current tenant is The Whole Backstage, a non-profit youth drama organization. A new, 337-seat auditorium was constructed in 2005. The building was listed on the National Register of Historic Places in 2003.
