= Albert G. Henry Jr. House =

Historic house in Alabama, United States

- U.S. National Register of Historic Places
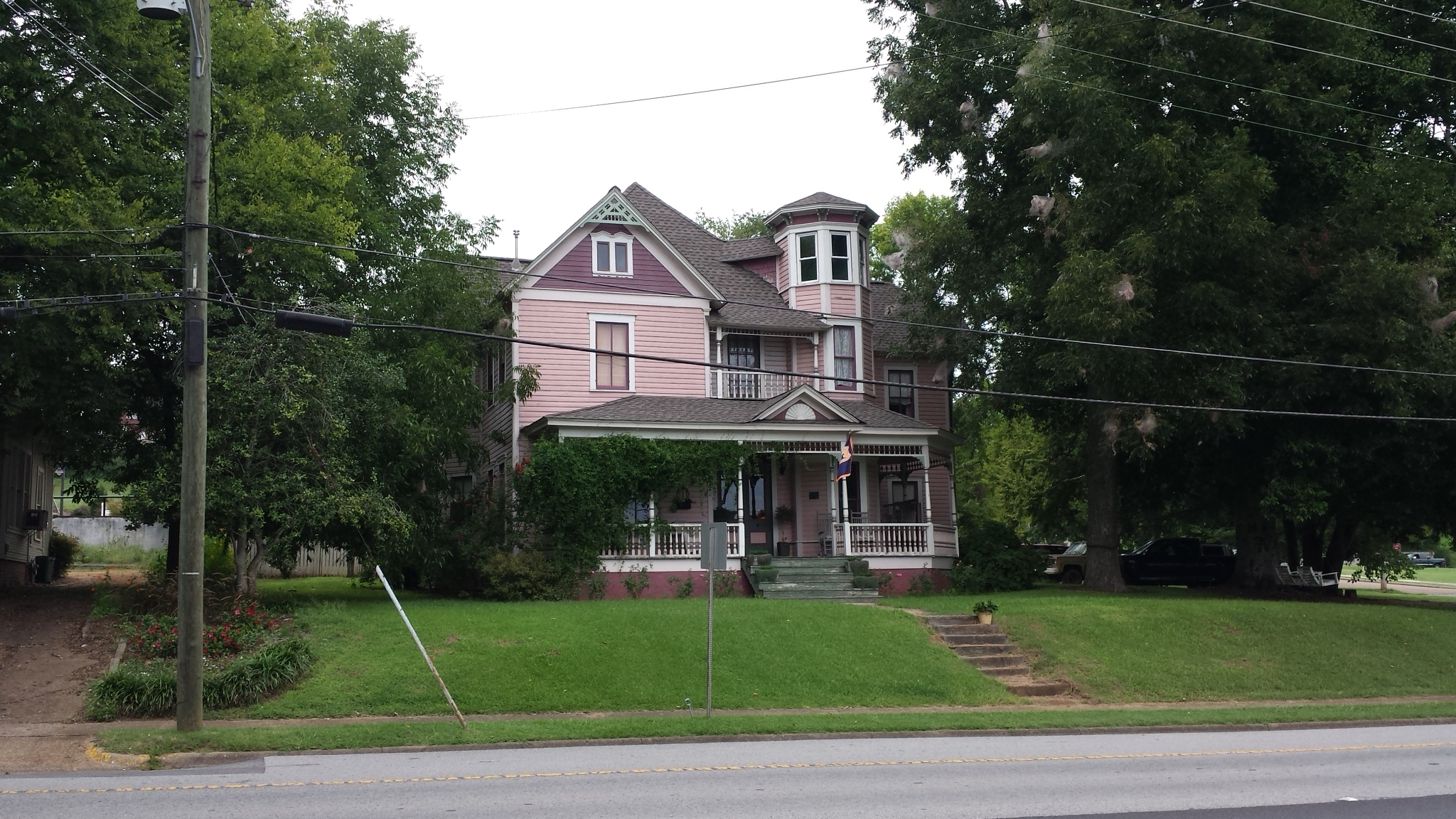

- Location within Alabama Location within the United States
- Location: 308 Blount Ave., Guntersville, Alabama
- Coordinates: 34°21′38″N 86°17′31″W
- Area: 0.5 acres (0.20 ha)
- Built: 1895
- Architectural style: Queen Anne
- NRHP reference No.: 89000291
- Added to NRHP: April 13, 1989

The Albert G. Henry Jr. House is a historic residence in Guntersville, Alabama. It was built in 1895 by Albert G. Henry Jr., a prominent merchant in the town. Henry's grandfather came to Marshall County in 1828, establishing a mercantile business along the Tennessee River. His son, Albert Sr., continued the business, becoming the dominant store in Guntersville by the beginning of the Civil War. After the war, he extended credit to his patrons to help rebuild the area. Albert Jr. followed his father into business, becoming the only millionaire in Alabama in 1880. He built the two-story, Queen Anne-style mansion in 1895, which features a tower, large wraparound front porch, and extensively detailed woodwork. It sits across from the Greek Revival Henry-Jordan House, built by Albert's brother, Pat, in 1877. The house was listed on the National Register of Historic Places in 1989.
