= Henry–Jordan House =

Historic house in Alabama, United States

- U.S. National Register of Historic Places
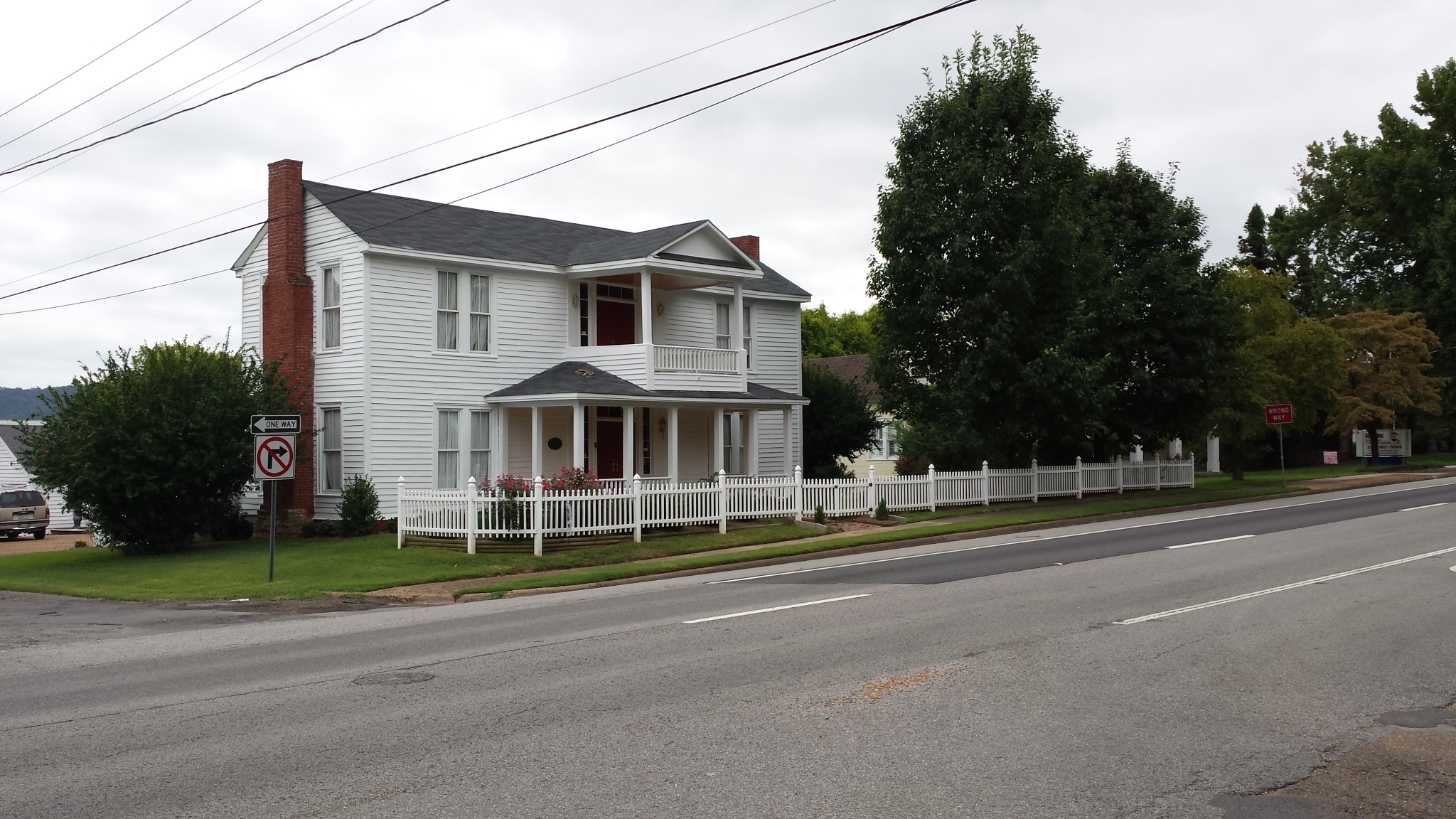

- Location within Alabama Location within the United States
- Location: 301 Blount Ave., Guntersville, Alabama
- Coordinates: 34°21′39″N 86°17′28″W
- Area: 0.3 acres (0.12 ha)
- Built: 1875–77
- Architectural style: Central Hall Plan
- NRHP reference No.: 79003351
- Added to NRHP: September 4, 1979

The Henry–Jordan House is a historic house located in Guntersville, Alabama.

== Description and history ==
The house was built in 1875–77 by Pat Henry, a prominent local merchant. Henry's grandfather and father were also merchants, and built their business into the largest in the Marshall County. Henry attended the Cumberland Law School, returning home to join his father, and eventually took over the business upon his father's death in 1856. He retired in 1876, and constructed the Greek Revival house around the same time. The two-story house follows a central hall plan, and has a wide entry porch with a narrow balcony above. The house was later acquired by Billy Jordan, a local farmer. It sits across from the Albert G. Henry Jr. House, built by Pat's brother in 1895.

The house was listed on the National Register of Historic Places on September 4, 1979.
