= Albertville, Alabama =

City in Alabama, United States

- City
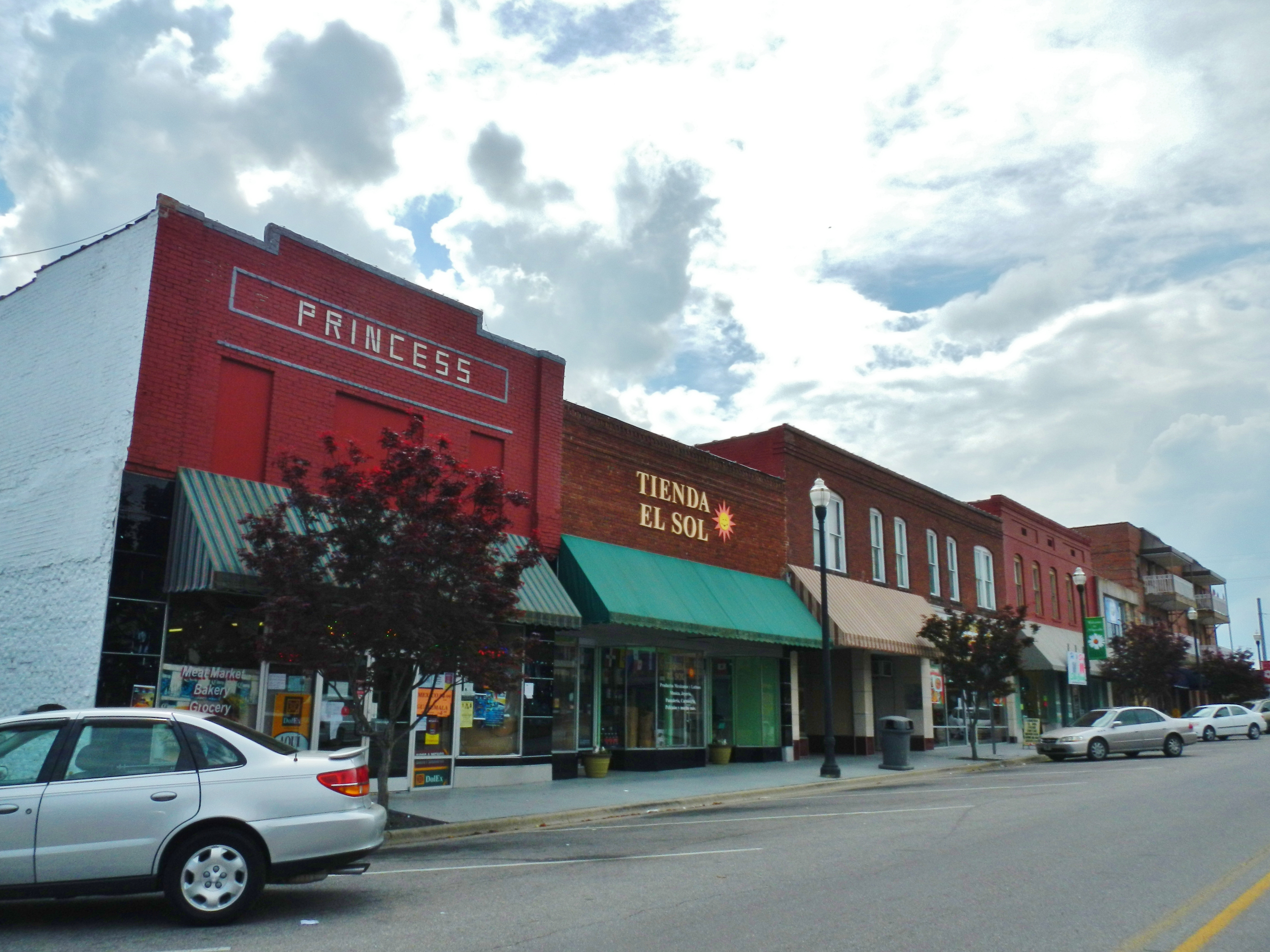
- Albertville in 2012

- Seal Logo
- Nickname: The Heart of Sand Mountain
- Location in Marshall County, Alabama
- Coordinates: 34°15′45″N 86°12′40″W
- Country: United States
- State: Alabama
- County: Marshall
- Founded: 1850
- Incorporated: February 18, 1891

Government
  - Type: Mayor Council

Area
  - City: 27.037 sq mi (70.026 km^{2})
  - Land: 26.937 sq mi (69.766 km^{2})
  - Water: 0.100 sq mi (0.259 km^{2})
- Elevation: 1,024 ft (312 m)

Population (2020)
  - City: 22,386
  - Estimate (2022): 22,726
  - Density: 844/sq mi (325.7/km^{2})
  - Urban: 38,476
  - Urban density: 1,104/sq mi (426.4/km^{2})
  - Metro: 99,423
  - Metro density: 175.7/sq mi (67.84/km^{2})
- Time zone: UTC−6 (Central (CST))
  - Summer (DST): UTC−5 (CDT)
- ZIP Codes: 35950, 35951
- Area codes: 256 and 938
- FIPS code: 01-00988
- GNIS feature ID: 2403074
- Website: cityofalbertville.com

Albertville is a city in Marshall County, Alabama, United States, and is included in the Huntsville-Decatur Combined Statistical Area. The population was 22,386 at the 2020 census. It is the largest city in Marshall County.

== History ==
The area which today includes Albertville was inhabited by the indigenous Cherokee, until their removal to Oklahoma in the 1830s. It was near the territory of the Creek nation, and several major trails which afforded communication (or military action) between the two nations crossed the area. It is believed to have been crossed by Spanish explorer Hernando de Soto during his expeditions in 1540.

During the American Civil War, the area around Albertville was the scene of several mid-level clashes between Union and Confederate forces.

The first non-indigenous settlement in what is today Albertville began in the 1850s. It was named for Thomas A. Albert, an early settler who moved from Georgia and was a town leader until his death in 1876. The city was incorporated in 1891. A post office was established in 1910.

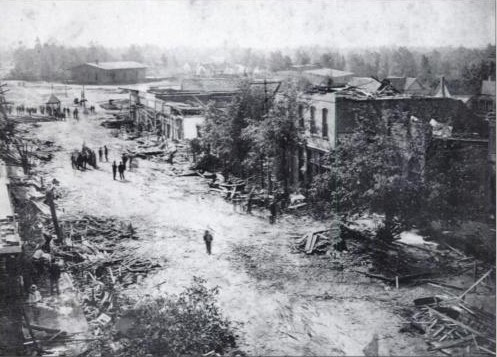
Tornado damage from the Great Cyclone of 1908

About 4:10 p.m. on April 24, 1908, the city was virtually wiped out by a tornado that became commonly called "The Great Cyclone", or "The Cyclone of 1908". The storm is believed to have killed 35 people across northeastern Alabama, including 15 in Albertville. Relief was largely delivered by railroad, particularly from the nearby city of Gadsden. Trains from Gadsden transported doctors, nurses, and the Queen City Guards, the Alabama militia company based in Gadsden. The commander of the latter, future Gadsden mayor and Col. R.A. Mitchell, reported in a dispatch to Governor B.B. Comer:

The destruction of property here is, I think, unprecedented in the history of the state. I have never seen anything like it, so complete and absolute as to leave little of worth in the path of the storm through town. On viewing the wreckage, covering easily forty acres or more in the heart of town, it appears incredible that any living being could have escaped the fury of the storm and death.

In 1893, the Alabama Legislature passed an act for the erection of an agricultural college in each of the state's congressional districts. After some competition, Albertville was awarded the school for the Seventh District. This is the school that evolved into today's Albertville High School, whose sports teams are still known as the "Aggies".

In 1910, Albertville had a population of 1,544, becoming the largest community in Marshall County.

Before the New Deal, when the Tennessee Valley Authority built Guntersville Dam, flooding on the Tennessee River would frequently leave the county courthouse in Guntersville inaccessible for residents of Albertville and other areas atop Sand Mountain. In 1919, the Alabama Legislature responded by requiring the erection of a courthouse at Albertville, in which cases arising in that part of the county would be heard.

In 1950, Albertville had a population of 5,397, and reclaimed the title (from Guntersville) of the largest city in the county, and has held the distinction ever since.

On June 1, 2009, the city council voted to establish English as the town's official language. Albertville's Hispanic demographic plurality strongly protested this decision in a series of demonstrations near the mayor's office.

On April 24, 2010, an EF-3 tornado ripped through downtown Albertville. The storm resulted in no deaths. The high school was severely damaged, nearly every home had some type of damage, and many were destroyed beyond repair.

== Geography ==
Albertville is located in southeastern Marshall County, and is bordered to the southeast by the city of Boaz and to the northwest by the city of Guntersville.

According to the United States Census Bureau, the city has a total area of 27.037 square miles (70.03 km^{2}), of which 26.937 square miles (69.77 km^{2}) is land and 0.100 square miles (0.26 km^{2}), is water.

The city sits at an elevation of 1,060 feet (320 m) atop Sand Mountain, a plateau that in this area is about 15 miles (24 km) wide. The Tennessee Valley Divide passes through the southern part of the city. The majority of the city drains north to Short Creek, a tributary of the Tennessee River, while the southern part drains to Slab Creek, a west-flowing tributary of the Locust Fork of the Black Warrior River. The current slogan of Albertville is "The Heart of Sand Mountain", which can be seen on the welcome sign coming into the city.

=== Climate ===
Climate data for Albertville, Alabama
Month	Jan	Feb	Mar	Apr	May	Jun	Jul	Aug	Sep	Oct	Nov	Dec	Year
Mean daily maximum °F (°C)	51.2 (10.7)	54.1 (12.3)	62.3 (16.8)	71.8 (22.1)	79.6 (26.4)	86.9 (30.5)	88.7 (31.5)	88.2 (31.2)	83.5 (28.6)	73.9 (23.3)	61.2 (16.2)	52.9 (11.6)	71.2 (21.8)
Mean daily minimum °F (°C)	32.5 (0.3)	33.7 (0.9)	40.4 (4.7)	48.8 (9.3)	56.9 (13.8)	63.8 (17.7)	66.9 (19.4)	66.0 (18.9)	60.4 (15.8)	49.6 (9.8)	39.2 (4.0)	33.8 (1.0)	49.3 (9.6)
Average precipitation inches (mm)	5.3 (130)	5.0 (130)	6.3 (160)	4.6 (120)	4.3 (110)	3.5 (89)	4.7 (120)	3.6 (91)	3.4 (86)	2.9 (74)	3.6 (91)	5.1 (130)	52.4 (1,330)
Source: Weatherbase

== Demographics ==
=== City of Albertville ===
Historical population
Census	Pop.	Note	%±
1910	1,544		—
1920	1,666		7.9%
1930	2,716		63.0%
1940	3,651		34.4%
1950	5,397		47.8%
1960	8,250		52.9%
1970	9,963		20.8%
1980	12,039		20.8%
1990	14,507		20.5%
2000	17,247		18.9%
2010	21,160		22.7%
2020	22,386		5.8%
2022 (est.)	22,726	▲	1.5%
U.S. Decennial Census; 2020 Census

Albertville first appeared as an incorporated town on the 1910 U.S. Census. It was also the same name as its precinct/census division, which preceded it in reporting on the census since 1880 (See Albertville Precinct below). Albertville is one of Alabama's most Hispanic cities, with a third of the population identifying as Hispanic or Latino. Only Decatur, Birmingham, Montgomery, and Huntsville have larger Hispanic populations as of the 2020 census.

=== Racial and ethnic composition ===
Albertville city, Alabama – Racial and ethnic composition Note: the US Census treats Hispanic/Latino as an ethnic category. This table excludes Latinos from the racial categories and assigns them to a separate category. Hispanics/Latinos may be of any race. Race and ethnicity was not surveyed in Alabama for populations under 2,500 in the 1980 census and under 1,000 in 1990 census.
Race / Ethnicity (NH = Non-Hispanic)	Pop 1980	Pop 1990	Pop 2000	Pop 2010	Pop 2020	% 1980	% 1990	% 2000	% 2010	% 2020
White alone (NH)	11,768	14,194	13,923	14,419	12,821	97.75%	97.84%	80.73%	68.14%	57.27%
Black or African American alone (NH)	177	182	344	354	1,030	1.47%	1.25%	1.99%	1.67%	4.60%
Native American or Alaska Native alone (NH)	8	32	49	105	73	0.07%	0.22%	0.28%	0.50%	0.33%
Asian alone (NH)	14	22	43	97	178	0.12%	0.15%	0.25%	0.46%	0.80%
Native Hawaiian or Pacific Islander alone (NH)	x	x	5	23	14	x	x	0.03%	0.11%	0.06%
Other race alone (NH)	0	0	8	29	35	0.00%	0.00%	0.05%	0.14%	0.16%
Mixed race or Multiracial (NH)	x	x	102	234	690	x	x	0.59%	1.11%	3.08%
Hispanic or Latino (any race)	72	77	2,773	5,899	7,545	0.60%	0.53%	16.08%	27.88%	33.70%
Total	12,039	14,507	17,247	21,160	22,386	100.00%	100.00%	100.00%	100.00%	100.00%

=== 2020 census ===
As of the 2020 census, there were 22,386 people, 7,671 households, and 5,487 families residing in the city.

The median age was 33.1 years. 29.7% of residents were under the age of 18 and 14.0% of residents were 65 years of age or older. For every 100 females there were 93.1 males, and for every 100 females age 18 and over there were 89.9 males age 18 and over.

85.9% of residents lived in urban areas, while 14.1% lived in rural areas.

Of the 7,671 households, 40.4% had children under the age of 18 living in them. Of all households, 47.5% were married-couple households, 16.6% were households with a male householder and no spouse or partner present, and 30.5% were households with a female householder and no spouse or partner present. About 23.7% of all households were made up of individuals and 12.1% had someone living alone who was 65 years of age or older.

There were 8,111 housing units, of which 5.4% were vacant. The homeowner vacancy rate was 1.3% and the rental vacancy rate was 5.1%.

=== 2010 census ===
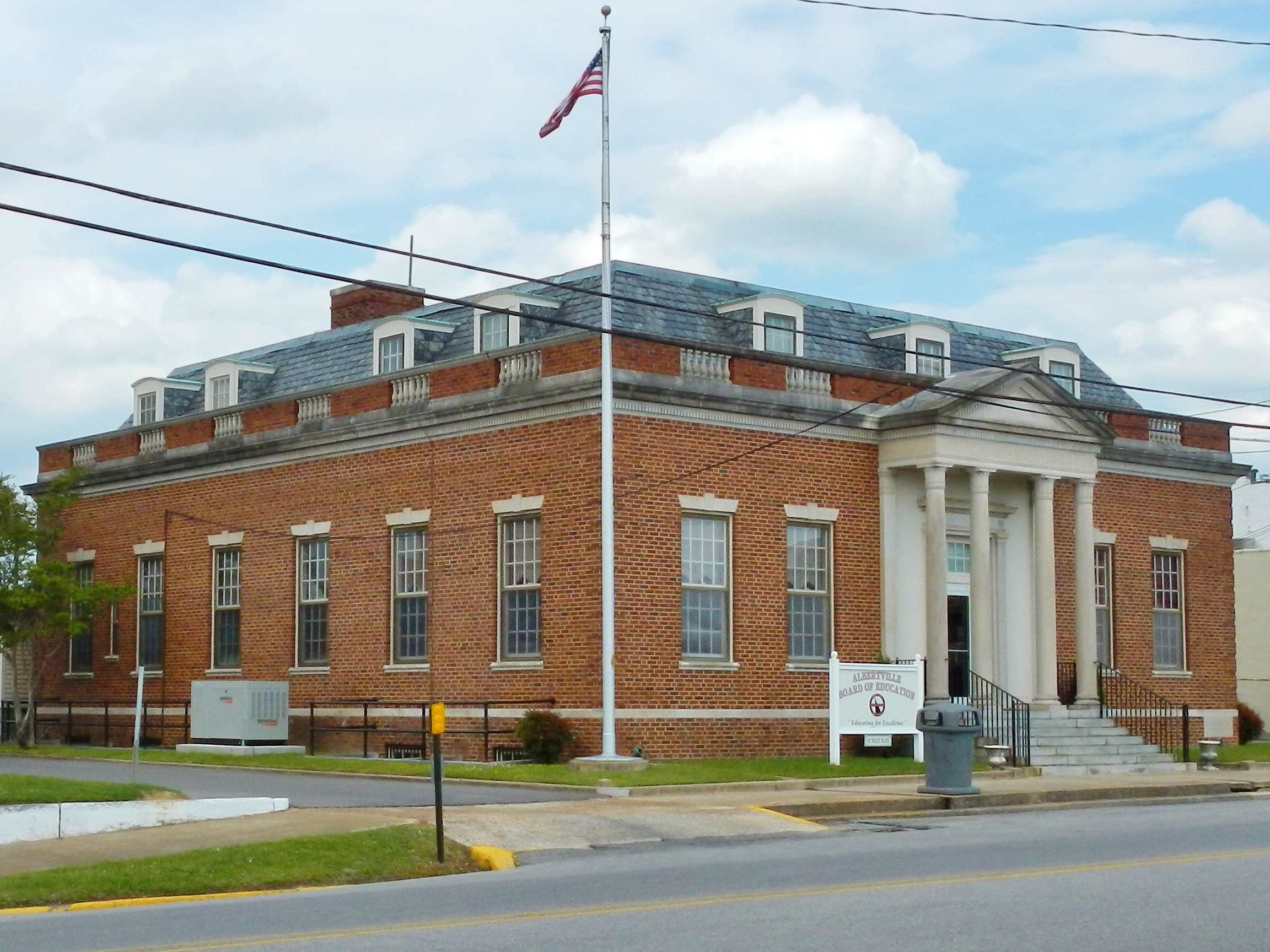
The former post office, now used by Albertville Board of Education, was built in 1931 and is listed on the National Register of Historic Places.

As of the 2010 census, there were 21,160 people in 7,497 households, including 5,270 families, in the city. The population density was 813.8 inhabitants per square mile (314.2/km^{2}). There were 8,128 housing units at an average density of 312.6 per square mile (120.7/km^{2}). The racial makeup of the city was 75.9% White, 1.9% Black or African American, 0.8% Native American, 0.5% Asian, 0.1% Pacific Islander, 18.7% from other races, and 2.1% from two or more races. 27.9% of the population are Hispanic or Latino.

In 2010, of the 7,497 households 34.6% had children under the age of 18 living with them, 50.5% were married couples living together, 14.2% had a female householder with no husband present, and 29.7% were non-families. 24.6% of households were one person and 11.9% were one person aged 65 or older. The average household size was 2.79 and the average family size was 3.27.

The age distribution was 28.2% under the age of 18, 10.2% from 18 to 24, 28.4% from 25 to 44, 20.7% from 45 to 64, and 12.5% 65 or older. The median age was 32.3 years. For every 100 females, there were 97.2 males. For every 100 females age 18 and over, there were 104.2 males.

The median household income was $35,843 and the median family income was $41,862. Males had a median income of $30,164 versus $25,700 for females. The per capita income for the city was $16,839. About 15.8% of families and 23.6% of the population were below the poverty line, including 35.6% of those under age 18 and 7.6% of those age 65 or over.

=== 2000 census ===
As of the 2000 census, there were 17,247 people in 6,566 households, including 4,615 families, in the city. The population density was 664.6 inhabitants per square mile (256.6/km^{2}). There were 7,090 housing units at an average density of 273.2 per square mile (105.5/km^{2}). The racial makeup of the city was 86.15% White, 2.05% Black or African American, 0.31% Native American, 0.26% Asian, 0.10% Pacific Islander, 9.78% from other races, and 1.35% from two or more races. 16.08% of the population are Hispanic or Latino.

In 2000 Of the 6,566 households 32.7% had children under the age of 18 living with them, 54.0% were married couples living together, 11.9% had a female householder with no husband present, and 29.7% were non-families. 25.9% of households were one person and 12.2% were one person aged 65 or older. The average household size was 2.59 and the average family size was 3.08.

The age distribution was 26.0% under the age of 18, 10.1% from 18 to 24, 28.7% from 25 to 44, 20.7% from 45 to 64, and 14.5% 65 or older. The median age was 34 years. For every 100 females, there were 93.1 males. For every 100 females age 18 and over, there were 89.9 males.

The median household income was $31,893 and the median family income was $38,508. Males had a median income of $30,076 versus $20,275 for females. The per capita income for the city was $16,336. About 14.1% of families and 16.7% of the population were below the poverty line, including 21.8% of those under age 18 and 21.0% of those age 65 or over.

=== Albertville Precinct/Division (1880–1970); Albertville-Boaz Division (1980–) ===
Historical population
Census	Pop.	Note	%±
1880	569		—
1890	1,388		143.9%
1900	2,479		78.6%
1910	3,820		54.1%
1920	4,322		13.1%
1930	5,309		22.8%
1940	5,873		10.6%
1950	7,839		33.5%
1960	12,044		53.6%
1970	13,756		14.2%
1980	24,970		81.5%
1990	26,537		6.3%
2000	31,407		18.4%
2010	37,950		20.8%
2020	22,386		−41.0%
U.S. Decennial Census; 2020 Census

Albertville, the 4th Beat/Precinct of Marshall County, first appeared on the 1880 U.S. Census. In 1960, Albertville precinct was changed to census division as part of a general reorganization of counties. In 1980, Albertville and Boaz Census Divisions were merged to become the Albertville-Boaz Census Division.

== Economy ==
Albertville is home to the Mueller Company, which produces fire hydrants, thus Albertville holds the title of "Fire Hydrant Capital of the World". To commemorate the one millionth fire hydrant, a chrome fire hydrant was placed outside the Albertville Chamber of Commerce.

Albertville is also home to poultry plants operated by Wayne Farms, Pilgrim's Pride, and Tyson Foods.

Mitchell Grocery Corporation, located in Albertville, is a wholesale grocery distribution center serving more than 200 independent supermarkets in the Southeast.

In April 2012, Newman Technology, broke ground on an auto parts manufacturing facility in Albertville. This plant will build component parts for Honda, Acura and Toyota and was expected to begin operating in early 2013. Newman was established in 1987 and is a wholly owned subsidiary of Sankei Giken Kogyo Co. of Japan. It is a supplier of fabricated and value-added assemblies to the automotive and recreational vehicle markets with facilities current in Mansfield, Ohio, and Aiken, S.C.

== Government ==
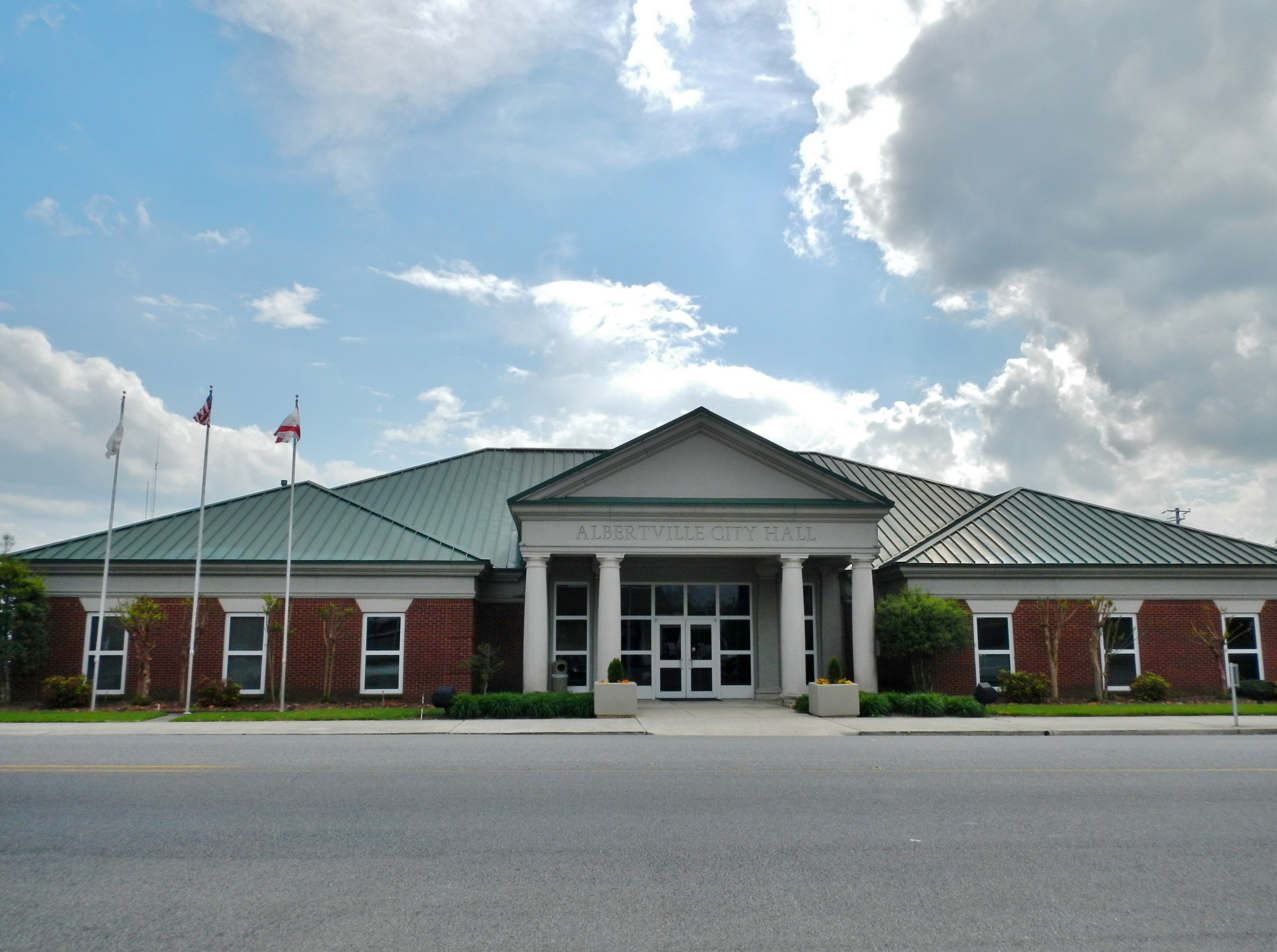
City hall

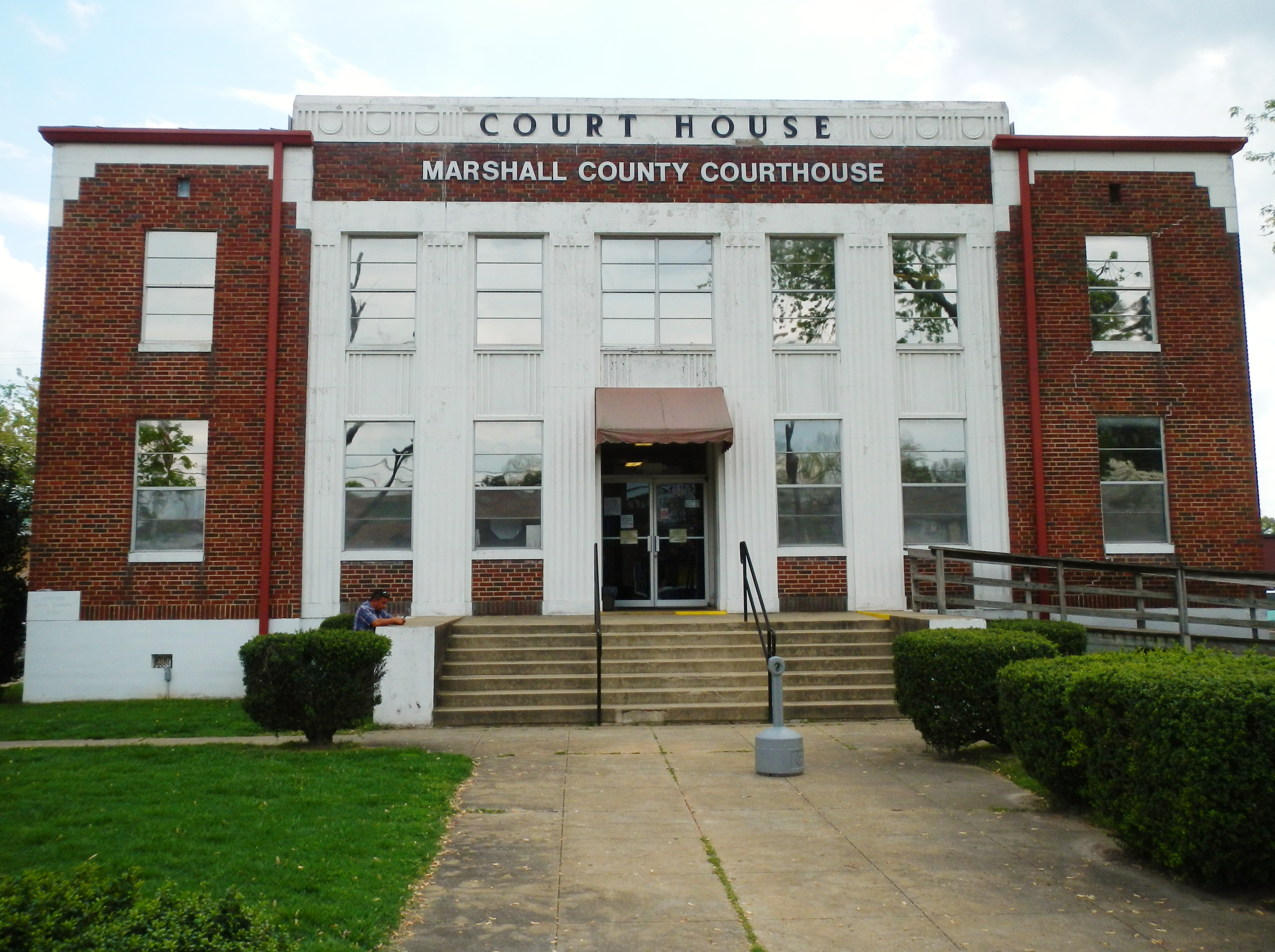
Marshall County satellite courthouse

Members of the city council (2023) include:

Name	Position
Nathan Broadhurst	President
Ben McGowan	President Pro-Temp
Jill Oakley	Member
Charles Bailey	Member
Ray Kennamer	Member

== Education ==
Public schools are overseen by Albertville City Schools. There are six schools in the city:

- Albertville Kindergarten: Pre-K and kindergarten
- Albertville Primary School: 1st and 2nd grades
- Albertville Elementary School: 3rd and 4th grades
- Albertville Intermediate School: 5th and 6th grades
- Albertville Middle School: 7th and 8th grades
- Albertville High School: 9th through 12th grades

== Infrastructure ==
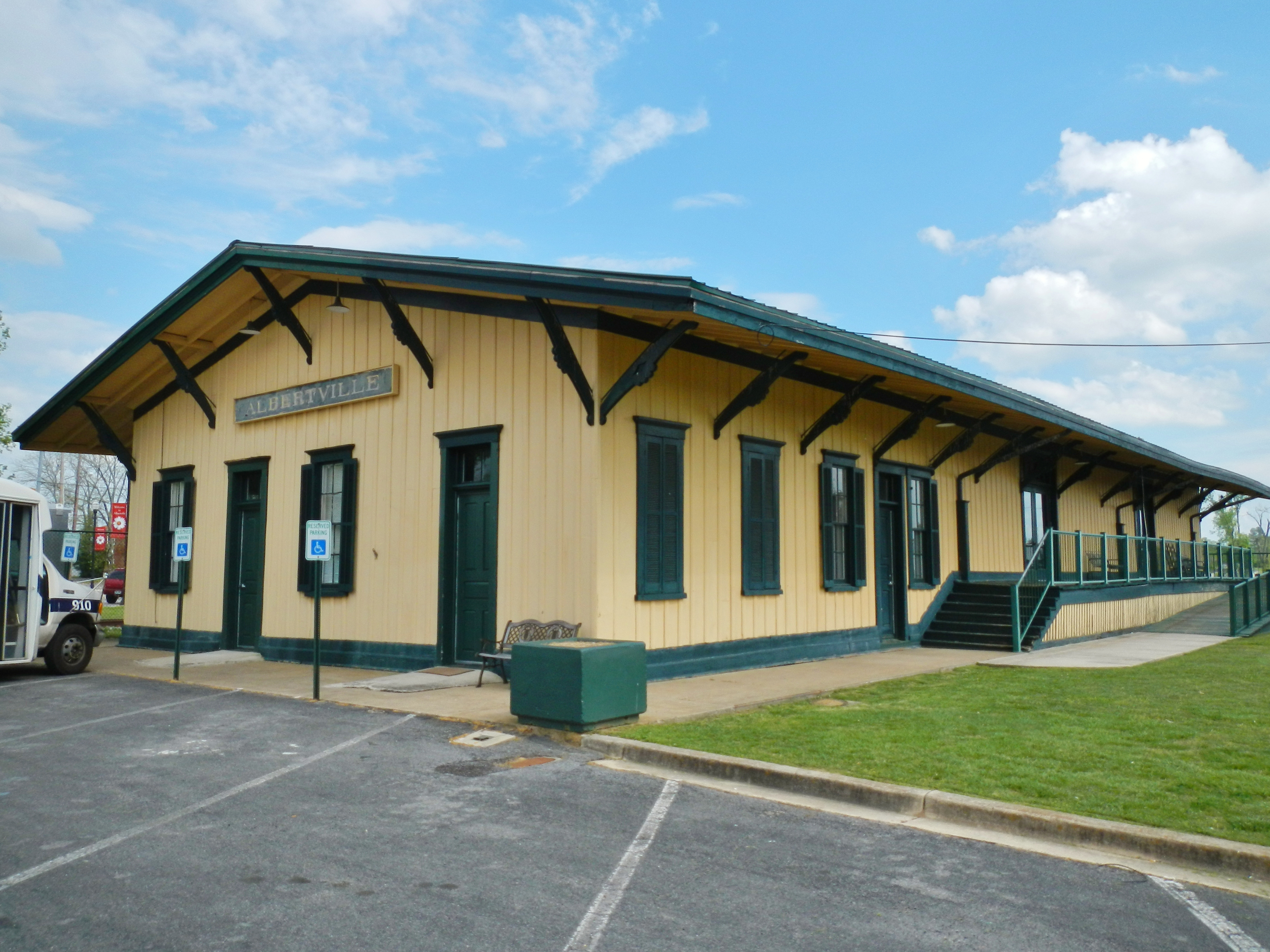
The Albertville Louisville and Nashville Railroad depot is listed on the National Register of Historic Places

=== Transportation ===
- U.S. Highway 431
- Alabama Highway 75
- Alabama State Route 205
- Thomas J. Brumlik Field (Albertville Regional Airport)
- Alabama and Tennessee River Railway

=== Healthcare ===
- Marshall Medical Center South, a 150-bed facility, serves the region.

== Notable people ==
- Edward Earl Carnes, judge, United States Court of Appeals for the Eleventh Circuit
- Rusty Greer, professional baseball player with the Texas Rangers
- Charley Hannah, former professional football offensive guard and defensive end
- John Hannah, professional football offensive lineman; elected to the Pro Football Hall of Fame
- Glenn Hearn, former mayor of Huntsville, Alabama, FBI Special Agent, Alabama State Legislator
- Angela Little, model, actress, and Playboy Playmate of the Month
- Ola L. Mize, United States Army officer and recipient of the Medal of Honor for his actions in the Korean War
- Charley Pell, former head football coach at Clemson University and the University of Florida
- Susan Story, utility executive
- Bobby Thomason, first professional football quarterback to throw for over 400 yards in a single game

== In popular culture ==
When the 1992 Winter Olympics were held in Albertville, France, the citizens of its heteronymic counterpart in Alabama took full advantage of the opportunity to put their town on display. Mock winter games were held in this subtropical city, and one New Orleans radio station offered listeners a chance to win a trip to "the Albertville games" in Alabama.

In 2008, Albertville was featured in an episode in the fifth season of the A&E television documentary series Intervention titled "Meth Mountain". Among the featured Albertville residents was Dr. Mary Holley, an obstetrician whose methamphetamine-addicted brother committed suicide, and who founded the anti-methamphetamine group "Mothers Against Methamphetamine".

Albertville was featured in two episodes of the radio show and podcast This American Life. The episodes focused on the influx of Latino immigrants in the town's chicken plants and the impact this had on the community.
