= Sharecroppers' Union =

Trade union of African American farmers

The Sharecroppers' Union, also known as SCU or Alabama Sharecroppers’ Union, was a trade union of predominantly African American tenant farmers (commonly referred to as sharecroppers) in the American South that operated from 1931 to 1936. Its aims were to improve wages and working conditions for sharecroppers.

Founded in 1931 in Tallapoosa County, Alabama, the Sharecroppers' Union had its origins in the Croppers’ and Farm Workers’ Union (CFWU). It was founded with the support of the Communist Party USA and, although theoretically open to all races, its membership by 1933 was solely African-American. Among its first members was Ned Cobb, whose story was told in Theodore Rosengarten’s All God's Dangers: The Life of Nate Shaw.

SCU's initial demands included continuation of food advances, which had been suspended by landowners in an attempt to drive down wages; the ASU also demanded the right to sell surplus crops directly in the market rather than having to rely on brokerage by the landowners. They demanded also the right to cultivate small garden plots in order to minimize dependency on the landowners for food. In addition to the demand for payments to be made in cash rather than in goods, SCU membership also demanded nine-month public elementary schools for their children.

In 1935, the SCU turned its attention to the Federal government. Subsidies which were provided by the New Deals' 1933 Agricultural Adjustment Act (AAA) benefited only the landowners and the SCU sued the Federal government for direct payment to sharecroppers. The AAA was declared unconstitutional in 1936 and the case was subsequently dropped.

By 1935, membership had reached 5,000; by 1936, membership had nearly doubled to 10,000. However, in October of that year the Communist Party, desirous of promoting a more popular-frontist bloc with Democrats in the South, withdrew its support of SCU, resulting in the dissolution of the SCU as it merged first into the Farmers' Union of Alabama and then into the Alabama Agricultural Workers' Union.

== Beginnings ==
In the late 1920s, the Communist Party USA played a pivotal role in the origins of the Sharecroppers Union.The Communist Party approached the area of the Black Belt South with preparations to connect and solidify the ideas of self-determination and the ongoing daily struggles of African American sharecroppers. The Communist Party also had plans of becoming the main organizer for their sharecroppers that later turned into the Sharecroppers union. There were notions that this organizational movement was not going to be demonstrated in public. In 1930, the Party was beginning its efforts to organize in Birmingham, Alabama. Over the next few months the members of the union was steadily rising with members by August. With the rise of members for the union, many were perplexed on what exactly they were a part of, these misunderstandings were of members who presumed they were a part of the Communist Party, instead of the sharecroppers union. The Communist Party sent Mack Coad to the south, a veteran African American organizer. The Sharecroppers union was officially established in 1931 and meetings of union members led by Coad began to take place. By the summer of 1931, in Birmingham, there were reported to be over 200 African American members in the union, and the attempts to halt these meetings had begun from the local sheriff or racially motivated mobs. These raids turned extremely violent when the local sheriff, J.K. Young, spotted and began to harass Ralph Gray, a leader of the sharecroppers at the time. After a heated exchange, gun shots were traded by both individuals, both of which who were wounded by this altercation. Later on, a lynch mob formed and stormed Gray's home, where he was mercilessly executed. The lynch mob dumped Gray's body in front of the courthouse, as a message to the African American community. A month later, over 50 croppers met to establish the first 5 locals of the union. In the later half of 1931, The Communist Party had a meeting that reflected over the incidents that occurred in the summer. Tom Johnson, the Communist Party's district organizer of the Black Belt South, stated in the meeting that the events that unfolded stemmed from the union's inability to practice effective organization. At this point, the Communist Party acknowledged the reality of African Americans daily struggle. A direct link was made from the daily struggles to the battle for self-determination. Afterwards, The Party proceeded to amplify their approach on the Black Belt, locals that consisted of 10 sharecroppers were created and organized appropriately in this secondary effort. These locals that consisted of 10 individuals were also each elected in different roles that consisted of a captain, secretary, etc. Amongst these locals the participants would often discuss subjects related on Marxism as well as Leninism, the issues that workers are faced with in the world, socialism and self-determination. Captains of these locals had their own meetings where goals were introduced as well as any tasks or action to promote. Each group of these 10 sharecroppers would be responsible for providing any aide to women and children.

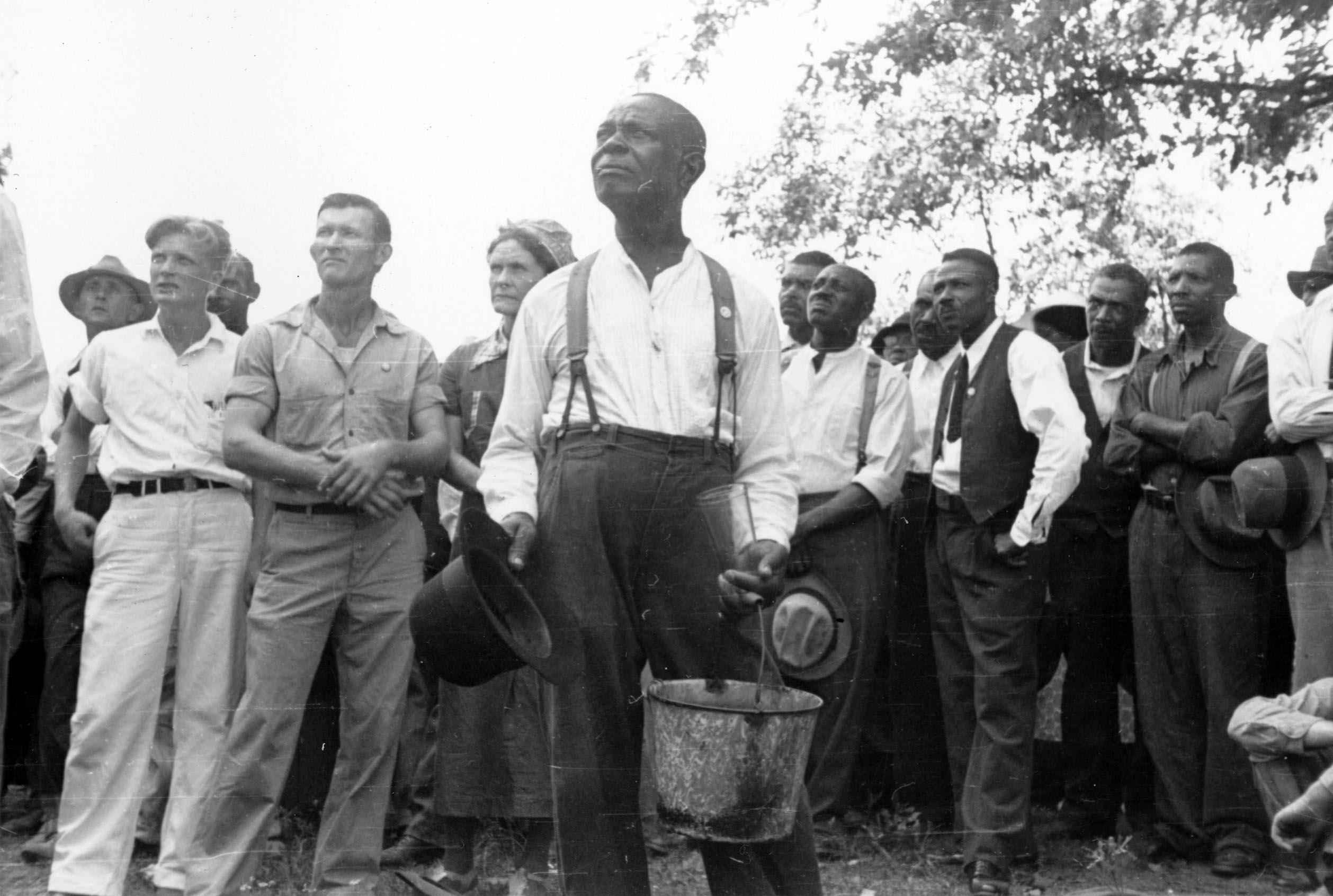
Black and White STFU members including Myrtle Lawrence and Ben Lawrence, listen to Norman Thomas speak outside Parkin, Arkansas on September 12, 1937

The Sharecroppers Union in less than a year had expanded to four counties that stretched over Black Belt. The number of members fluctuated between 100–150 for each individual county, locals were as well beginning to be formed in the outskirts of Macon and Chambers Counties. Within the growing phase of the Sharecroppers Union, concerns and questions started to rise on the teachings and the awareness of political education among the members. James Allen, a journalist who was writing for a news office based in Tennessee named the SW, reported that there was minimal reference to self-determination as an acknowledged goal, and that these discussions must be the topic of conversation in the training classes of the Party. The Party were users of printed propaganda in which they included articles of self-determination. Conflicts regarding self-determination in the communities were topics of conversations for the Party in their printed press. These printed articles were the primary source for political education for the locals. The Party's newspaper gave simplified political information in easier reading formats, illiteracy was rampant among the Sharecropper locals. There were criticisms among members that the press was not going to be sufficient in educational attempts. Party members who were closer towards the Sharecroppers made efforts for increased demand of materials for politically educational motives. Illiteracy was common among the majority of communities in the South. These illiteracy rates stemmed from minimal establishments of educational facilities from the local government. This led to plantation owners pressuring children to work. Members of the Party concluded that for political education to be effectively introduced than issues regarding illiteracy needed to be addressed primarily, this halted self-determination. Counties across the South each had no more than a couple of mailboxes which made literacy distribution an unrealistic idea. To combat this situation the Sharecroppers Union implemented an underground system for distributions of printed press within counties. Within the Sharecroppers Union the Party created unique units that were led by captains who were Party members, these captains were selected from exceptional demonstrations of loyalty to the Party. The Sharecroppers Union also introduced seven demands. These demands were paralleled with daily struggles that sharecroppers would centralize their organization along with the help of the Party. These demands were mainly about economic requests that would address control of the land, this would push sharecroppers to confronting landlords. There were no demands regarding voting or segregation.

The Communist Party USA assisted the Sharecroppers Union to focus on problems between sharecroppers and landowners. The Party elaborated to the sharecroppers that obtainment of self-determination meant the control of landowner's properties. Contrary to movements on going in the North, demands for social equality were uncommon to take place in meetings. Sharecroppers were brought to open conflict with landowners in 1931. Demands from the Sharecroppers Union were supposed to bring together the ideas of daily issues in the South for sharecroppers and self-determination. Within the first year of the Sharecroppers Union establishment, the union was successful in obtaining several victories against landlords. The sharecroppers then formed a committee that ordered landlords to provide clothing and shoes to families of sharecroppers.

== Violence against the union ==
The landlords accepted these terms. By 1932, the Sharecroppers Union began to face adversities regarding actual violence, the distribution of mail among counties for any attempts of organization and also the threatening presence and an outcome of physical violence from possible organized terrorist groups or from the local government, which most of the time were the same entity. Sharecroppers began to attend meetings armed to protect themselves, they also carried out cautious measures to purchase grand quantities of ammunition. Tensions among the Sharecroppers and law enforcement began to dangerously rise. On December 19, 1932, in Reeltown, Alabama, a deadly situation broke out regarding the sharecroppers and law enforcement. The local sheriff, Clifford Elder, arrived at the home of Cliff James, a sharecropper who was a leading member in the Sharecroppers Union. Sheriff Elder was making an attempt to seize the property of James, who had a previous altercation with a local merchant landowner who made claims of James owing him money. This merchant, W.S. Parker, contacted the sheriff when no agreement was made over the money that was owed. The sheriff was tasked with the confiscation of James's mules and cows. Members of the Sharecroppers Union that resided in Reeltown heard about the altercation on going at James's residence and decided to intervene and thwart attempts made by Sheriff Elder. The sharecroppers at the scene reported Sheriff Elder arriving with three additional deputies and immediately opening fire, in the retaliation of the sharecroppers, four deputies were wounded. Multiple sharecroppers were wounded, among the wounded was Cliff James who died from his injuries, another sharecropper was also killed at the scene of the confrontation.

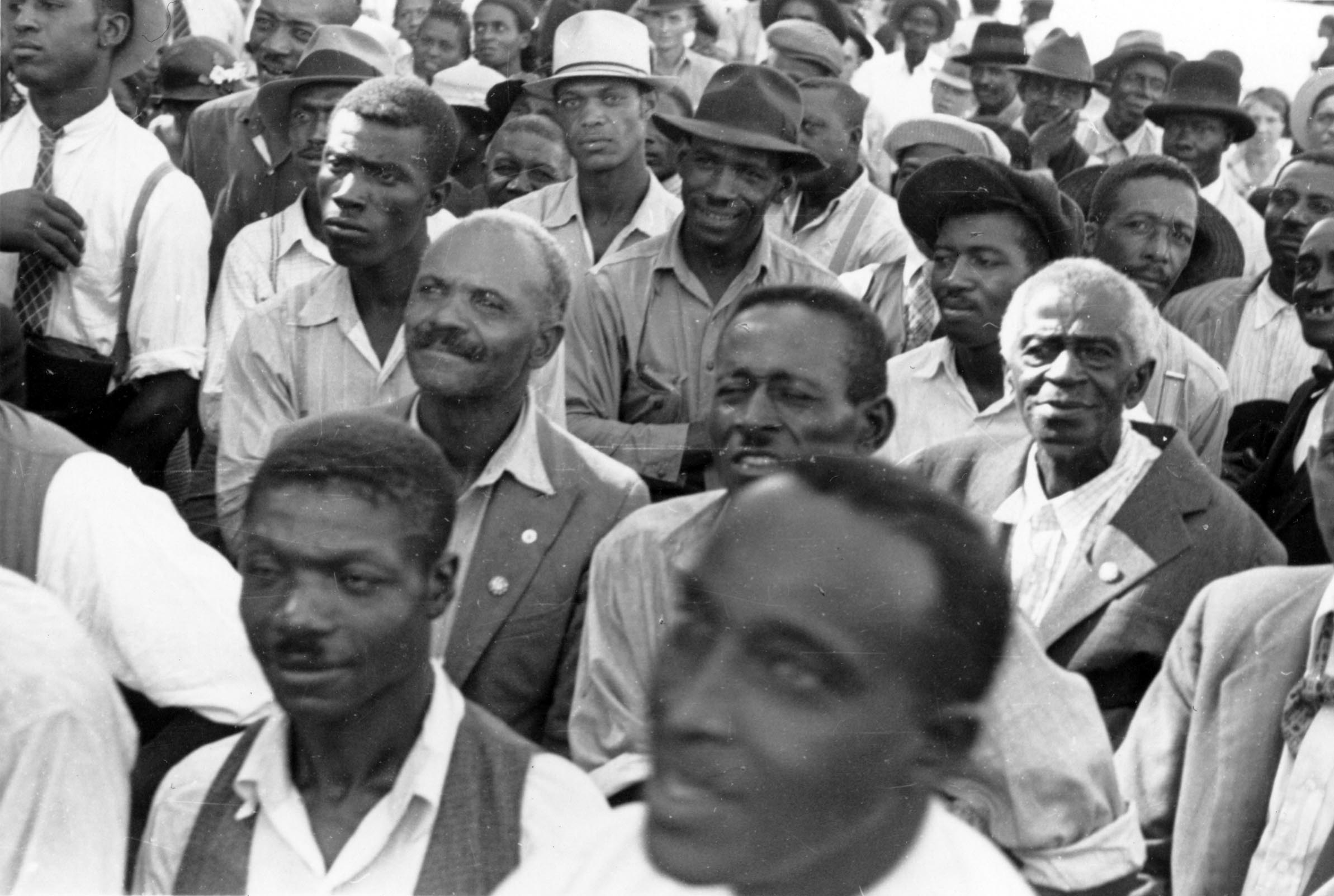
STFU members at an outdoor meeting, 1937

The reaction from the white locals was drastic and Southern white presses included concerning titles in their newspapers. African American press was of course more sympathetic to the sharecroppers who were involved. In 1933, the funeral for Cliff James and the other murdered sharecropper, Milo Bentley, was attended by more than 3,000 attendees, with thousands more who witnessed the event, Law enforcement were enforcing Jim Crow laws, they ejected any whites who attempted to participate. Four sharecroppers were charged for attempted murder, these sentences ranged from five to 12 years. The Party had criticisms that were internally acknowledged towards the incident that occurred in Reeltown. Members of the Party feared that more incidents like this were going to be reoccurring throughout other counties in the South. The Sharecroppers Union continued to organize and operate well into 1935. Several strikes ere called in by the Sharecroppers Union across counties that had larger numbers of support. These counties included, Tallapoosa, Lee, Chambers, Randolph, Montgomery, Lowndes, and Dallas. The demand for these strikes were payments of one dollar per day per ten hours of work. After extensive struggles, the Sharecroppers Union was successful in 35 plantations. In instances when the full dollar could not be met, sharecroppers were met with 75 cents a day and served meals and along with aid in transportation. These strikes included thousands of sharecroppers on several numbers of large plantations. By 1935, there were reported 12,000 sharecroppers in the Union. A major issue that the Sharecroppers Union also faced was being unable to gain any traction regarding their relationships with white sharecroppers. This was due to the fact that social equality began to be main topics of conversation, which then halted recruiting of white sharecroppers. Social equality wasn't a priority for the Party, but still insisted that all members should acknowledge its idea. They couldn't bring whites into the union because of this issue, which would unquestionably be devastating if they hesitated. The Party occasionally had a propensity to minimize the demands for racial equality and self-determination to appeal to white membership and participation. This was a result of opportunism, the conciliation of racism, and white chauvinism. Nat Ross, the district organizer for Alabama, made mention of a problem in the North Carolina District where pamphlets distributed by the Party had omitted requests that related to the concerns of African Americans in a letter to the Central Committee. After this episode, the district leader was abruptly fired, and it was alleged that he said: "The trouble with our Party is that we have too damned many negro demands." It took more than just a few committed, hard-working organizers to successfully unite many rural sharecroppers.

The amount of violence and intimidation that surrounds their organizational attempts cannot be understated. Both the Communist Party and union organizing were hampered by this degree of illegality. In an attempt to explain the situation in Alabama, recently arrived Ohioan and Party organizer Tom Johnson wrote to the Party leadership in New York in 1930. Even while the shootings in Dadeville and Reeltown were notable, there remained a level of daily violence that is hard to fathom. The state and the landowners have attacked the Sharecroppers Union violently and relentlessly, according to news reports and field reports. According to a 1933 Daily Worker story, deputy sheriffs had dispatched "lynch parties" to search Chambers County for the nine African American Sharecroppers Union members. "Landlords in Tallapoosa County are trying to have a law passed forcing Negroes to apply to the Mayor for passports to travel around the County," according to a report from the field. According to a 1932 Chicago Defender story, a Sharecroppers Union member was imprisoned for passing out union flyers. A District 17 Party committee meeting was discussing the 1935 strike when it was revealed that 15 Sharecroppers Union members who were African Americans had been killed in Lowndes County and that one Union organizer had spent four months in jail without being charged. It would have been practically difficult for any political force to successfully organize in Alabama during the 1930s due to the extent of state-sanctioned violence. The Party ultimately failed to bring about a broad-scale confrontation with the landowners and establish a balance of forces that would make the raising of self-determination an organizing demand. The Sharecroppers Union would go on expanding despite the persecution for a few more years, finally adding a few members in Louisiana, North Carolina, and Georgia. They did, however, eventually combine to form the Alabama Farmers Union. This was primarily due to the Party's new "Popular Front" stance, which saw them dissolve many mass groups with ties to the Party to unite with larger democratic movements. Ironically, the Party saw an irreparable collapse in the South throughout the Popular Front era while flourishing in the North. While the Party could form partnerships with a sizable progressive or non-communist left in the North, such social forces were seldom in the rural South. It is extremely improbable that the Party would have invested as much time and money in organizing sharecroppers in the South without the self-determination stance and the acknowledgment of African American oppression as a national issue. Its motivation to carry out these organizational operations came from the way it treated the persecution of African Americans as a national issue. But in addition to being used to inspire the Party leadership, the self-determination stance was also communicated to the Party and the Sharecroppers Union memberships through different Party publications and organizational sessions. Although there is little direct evidence of sharecroppers discussing self-determination, there is a lot of indirect evidence. Unfortunately, no sharecroppers' memoirs have survived to explicitly support this claim, which is unsurprising considering that the majority were illiterate or very somewhat literate.

Finally, the Party and the Sharecroppers Union were directly following the logic of self-determination by focusing on issues and demands that would exacerbate the tense relationship between the sharecroppers and the landlords. This created a situation in which the confiscation of the landlord's property would be the logical outcome of this protracted struggle. The Party proved that African American sharecroppers could be organized around a progressive political agenda during this small time frame. The aim of making self-determination a widespread desire among African Americans in the South was never achieved. However, they did contribute to the radicalization of the rural South. Recently, American historians have begun to refer to this time as a part of the "long civil rights movement." An essential and sometimes overlooked link in that movement is the Party's battle to organize the Sharecroppers Union in Alabama. Additionally, it should not go unmentioned that Lowndes County, Alabama, the scene of the most heinous violence during the 1935 SCU strike, would, just 31 years later, give rise to the cry for "Black power." The Communist Party and the SCU may have played a vital role in establishing a link in the ongoing fight for democracy in this crucial region of the United States if there are such things as traditions of struggle and historical recollections among communities. The Sharecroppers' Union and the Communist Party both faced significant challenges in the South during the mid-1930s, and by 1936, both organizations were largely in decline. The Sharecroppers' Union, also known as the Southern Tenant Farmers' Union, had grown rapidly in the early 1930s, organizing tens of thousands of sharecroppers and tenant farmers across the South. However, the union faced opposition from landlords, law enforcement officials, and other powerful interests, who saw the union as a threat to their control over the agricultural system. Many union leaders were arrested or harassed, and the organization struggled to maintain its momentum. Meanwhile, the Communist Party USA, which had made significant inroads among Southern sharecroppers and African Americans in the early 1930s, faced a backlash in the mid-1930s as the party's leadership became more closely aligned with the Soviet Union.

This shift alienated many Southern activists, who were suspicious of Soviet influence and hostile to Communist ideology. In addition, the party's leaders were often targeted by law enforcement officials and vigilante groups, leading to arrests and violent attacks. By 1936, both the Sharecroppers' Union and the Communist Party were in a state of decline, with many of their leaders either jailed, driven underground, or forced into exile. However, the legacy of these organizations lived on, as they had both played a significant role in advancing the cause of social and economic justice for Southern sharecroppers and African Americans. Many of the activists who had been involved with these organizations went on to play important roles in the Civil Rights Movement and other struggles for social justice in the decades to come.

== Communist Party USA's Interest ==
In the 1930s, the Communist Party USA (CPUSA) had a significant presence in the Black Belt region of the American South. The Black Belt, a term originally used to describe the fertile soil in the region, also became associated with the large African American population that lived there. The CPUSA saw the Black Belt as a potential stronghold for communist organizing because of the high level of poverty and racial discrimination experienced by African Americans in the region. The party hoped to build a multiracial coalition of poor and working-class people to challenge the power of the wealthy landowners and business interests that dominated the region. The CPUSA's organizing efforts in the Black Belt focused on issues such as tenant farming, sharecropping, and wage labor. They also advocated for civil rights and an end to racial discrimination. In 1931, the Communist Party USA had a small but growing presence in the South. The party's focus in the region was on organizing among African American workers, tenant farmers, and sharecroppers, who were among the most exploited and oppressed groups in the South. The CPUSA saw the South as a strategic region for building a broad-based coalition of workers and oppressed people that could challenge the power of the ruling class. The party believed that the exploitation and oppression of African Americans in the South were part of a broader system of capitalist exploitation and imperialism that needed to be dismantled.

The CPUSA's efforts in the South faced significant challenges, including harsh repression by state and local authorities, as well as hostility from many white Southern workers who were skeptical of the party's message of racial equality. Despite these challenges, the CPUSA continued to organize in the region throughout the 1930s. One notable example of the party's work in the South was the Sharecroppers' Union, which was founded in Alabama in 1931. The union was a multiracial organization that aimed to challenge the exploitative practices of sharecropping and to fight for better wages and working conditions for sharecroppers. Overall, the CPUSA's work in the South during this period laid the groundwork for later movements for civil rights and workers' rights in the region. The party worked to build alliances with local Black leaders and organizations, such as the Southern Tenant Farmers' Union, which was founded in Arkansas in 1934. However, the CPUSA's efforts in the Black Belt were met with intense opposition from local authorities and vigilante groups. The party's members and supporters faced harassment, intimidation, and violence, and many were arrested or imprisoned. Despite these challenges, the CPUSA continued to organize in the region throughout the 1930s, although their influence declined in the following decades. In 1932, the Communist Party USA was a member of the Communist International (Comintern), an international organization founded in 1919 to promote the spread of communism worldwide.

The Comintern provided ideological and strategic guidance to its member parties, including the CPUSA. In the South, the CPUSA's organizing efforts focused on issues such as tenant farming, sharecropping, and racial discrimination. The party saw the South as a potential area for revolution, and sought to build alliances with African American sharecroppers and white tenant farmers to challenge the power of the wealthy landowners who dominated the region. However, the CPUSA's efforts in the South were met with intense opposition from local authorities and vigilante groups. The party's members and supporters faced harassment, intimidation, and violence, and many were arrested or imprisoned. Despite these challenges, the CPUSA continued to organize in the region throughout the 1930s. In 1932, the CPUSA organized a campaign called the "Red Summer" in the South, which aimed to build support for the party among African Americans and white workers. The campaign involved a series of protests and strikes, and was met with fierce opposition from local authorities. In 1933, the Communist Party USA played a significant role in the founding of the Sharecroppers' Union in the American South. The Sharecroppers' Union was a multiracial organization that aimed to improve the lives of sharecroppers and tenant farmers, who were among the poorest and most exploited workers in the region.

The CPUSA saw the Sharecroppers' Union as a key element in their strategy to build a broad-based coalition of poor and working-class people in the South. The party provided funding, organizing expertise, and political support to the Sharecroppers' Union, which helped it to grow rapidly in its early years. In 1934, the Communist Party USA had a number of objectives in the South. One of its primary goals was to organize and mobilize Southern workers, including both black and white sharecroppers and industrial laborers, to challenge the power of wealthy landowners and industrialists. The party also sought to advance a vision of social and economic justice that emphasized the rights of workers and the need for collective action. This included advocating for policies such as minimum wages, shorter workweeks, and the right to unionize. In addition to its economic objectives, the Communist Party also sought to challenge racial discrimination and segregation in the South. The party was one of the few political organizations of the time that actively opposed segregation and advocated for racial equality. This included supporting anti-lynching legislation and advocating for desegregation of public spaces such as schools and transportation. The Communist Party also sought to build a base of support among African American communities in the South. This involved working with black labor leaders and intellectuals, as well as organizing campaigns around issues such as police brutality and the right to vote. The Communist Party USA (CPUSA) faced significant challenges and experienced a decline in the southern United States during the 1930s. While the party had made significant inroads among African Americans and poor whites in the region in the early 1930s, it faced a backlash in the mid-1930s that led to a decline in its influence. One major factor in the party's decline was the increasing hostility of law enforcement officials and vigilante groups. The party's leaders and members were often targeted by these groups, who saw the party as a threat to social order and American values. This led to arrests, harassment, and violent attacks, which made it difficult for the party to organize and mobilize its members. Another factor was the party's shifting priorities and strategies. In the early 1930s, the CPUSA had focused on organizing industrial workers and sharecroppers in the South, and had made significant progress in both areas. However, as the party's leadership became more closely aligned with the Soviet Union and Communist ideology, it began to prioritize other issues, such as anti-fascism and support for the Soviet Union. This shift alienated many Southern activists, who were suspicious of Soviet influence and hostile to Communist ideology. Finally, the Great Depression also played a role in the decline of the CPUSA in the South.

The economic challenges of the Depression led many Southern workers to focus on immediate economic issues rather than larger political and social goals. This made it difficult for the party to build a strong base of support among Southern workers and farmers. Overall, while the Communist Party USA made significant progress in the South in the early 1930s, it faced a backlash in the mid-1930s that led to a decline in its influence. However, the legacy of the party and its activism lived on, as many of the activists who had been involved with the CPUSA went on to play important roles in the Civil rights movement and other struggles for social justice in the decades to come. The Communist Party USA had a number of objectives in the South during 1934. One of its primary goals was to organize and mobilize Southern workers, including both black and white sharecroppers and industrial laborers, to challenge the power of wealthy landowners and industrialists. The party also sought to advance a vision of social and economic justice that emphasized the rights of workers and the need for collective action. This included advocating for policies such as minimum wages, shorter workweeks, and the right to unionize. In addition to its economic objectives, the Communist Party also sought to challenge racial discrimination and segregation in the South. The party was one of the few political organizations of the time that actively opposed segregation and advocated for racial equality. This included supporting anti-lynching legislation and advocating for desegregation of public spaces such as schools and transportation. The Communist Party also sought to build a base of support among African American communities in the South. This involved working with black labor leaders and intellectuals, as well as organizing campaigns around issues such as police brutality and the right to vote.

== Southern Tenant Farmers Union ==
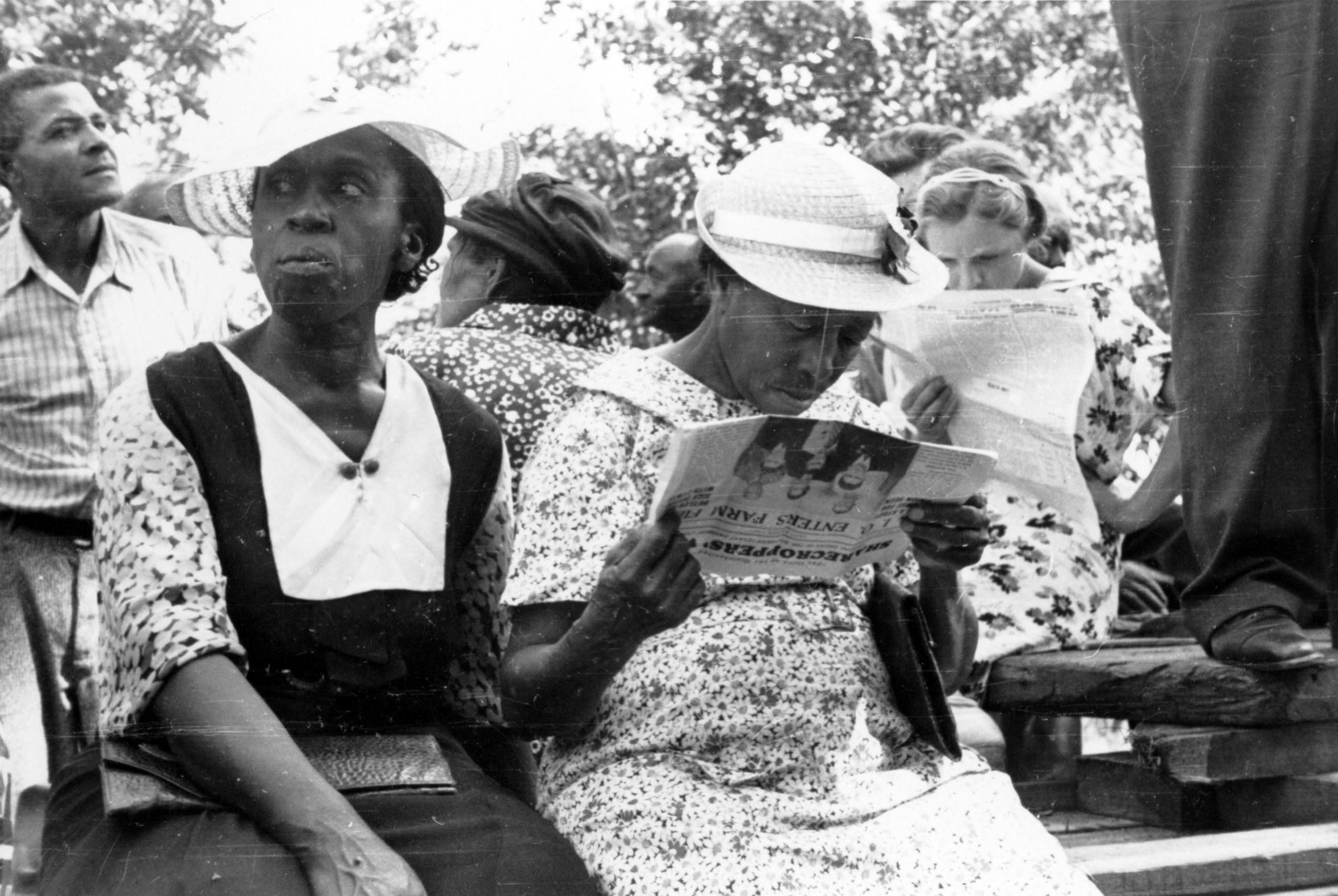
An unidentified woman and Sylvia Lawrence read the "Sharecroppers' Voice" during an outdoor STFU meeting, 1937

In 1934, the Communist Party USA (CPUSA) played a key role in the formation of the Southern Tenant Farmers' Union (STFU), which was a sharecroppers union that organized poor white and black farmers in the South. The STFU was founded in Arkansas and quickly spread to other states in the region. The CPUSA saw the STFU as an opportunity to build a multiracial movement that could challenge the power of the wealthy landowners and business interests that dominated the region. The party provided funding, organizational support, and leadership to the STFU, and many of its members became active in the union's activities. The STFU's organizing efforts focused on issues such as tenant farming, sharecropping, and wage labor. They demanded fair prices for cotton, which was the main crop grown by the farmers, and an end to the exploitation of sharecroppers by landlords and merchants. The union also advocated for civil rights and an end to racial discrimination.

The STFU's organizing efforts were met with intense opposition from local authorities and vigilante groups, who saw the union as a threat to their power. Members of the union faced harassment, intimidation, and violence, and many were arrested or imprisoned. Despite these challenges, the STFU continued to grow throughout the 1930s, and its organizing efforts laid the groundwork for later civil rights activism in the South. The STFU's membership was primarily composed of tenant farmers and sharecroppers, who were some of the poorest and most vulnerable people in the region. The union was focused on improving the economic conditions of its members, and it advocated for better wages, improved working conditions, and an end to the practice of sharecropping. The STFU was also committed to advancing civil rights for black farmers, who faced widespread discrimination and disenfranchisement in the South. The union worked to challenge segregation, lynching, and other forms of racial violence. The STFU faced significant opposition from the white supremacist power structure of the South, including vigilante groups and law enforcement officials. Members of the union were often subject to intimidation, violence, and arrest. Despite these challenges, the STFU continued to grow and organize throughout the 1930s. The legacy of the STFU can be seen in the broader labor and civil rights movements of the 20th century. The union's efforts to organize poor and working-class people of all races laid the groundwork for later movements, such as the Civil rights movement and the United Farm Workers.

== African American Self-Determination Movement ==
The Communist Party USA had sparked talks of self-determination amongst the population of African Americans in 1928. These empowering conversations were to shed light on possible ideas of creation of an independent African American nation. It was in the nature of the Comintern to introduce the ideologies of rightful self-determination amongst colonial people. In the 1930s, African American self-determination was a growing movement in the southern United States, particularly in response to the systemic discrimination and violence faced by Black people in the region. This movement was characterized by efforts to build economic and political power within Black communities, often through the creation of mutual aid societies, cooperatives, and other self-help organizations. One example of this movement was the Sharecroppers' Union, which was founded in 1934 by a group of Black and white farmers in Arkansas. The union was committed to improving the economic conditions of sharecroppers and tenant farmers, who were predominantly Black, and it played a key role in advocating for their rights and interests. This movement altered the way African Americans were perceived in the working class of the late 1920s. This alteration granted a different view in the eyes of the social working class, African Americans were deemed as an ally in the working class. This worked in favor to gain increased awareness and following. This led to a significant push in one of the very few organizational social movements that were actively combating against racially motivated acts, such as lynching and segregation. The Communist Party played an active role in the fight against racial oppression.

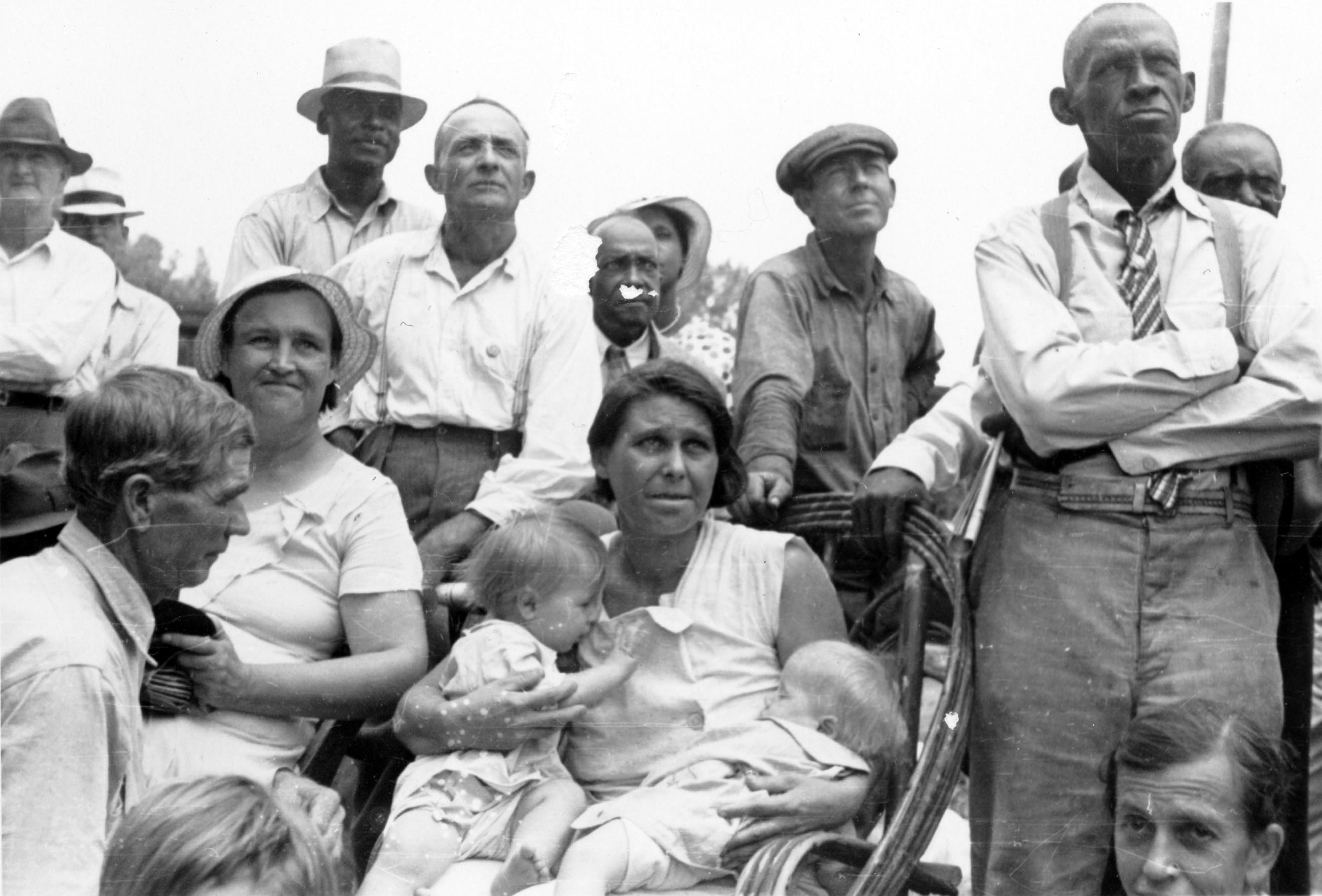
Men, women and children, Black and White, listen to a speaker at an outdoor Southern Tenant Farmers Union meeting, 1937

The Communist Party's principles and motives of daily activities shared similar connections to the policy of self-determination. Many scholars of American Communism have brought up topics that consisted of denying that self-determination for African Americans were not subjects of conversations but a substantial amount of evidence points towards the reoccurrence of these conversations amongst meetings of the Communist Party. In 1928, the Central Committee had confirmed their position of being the organizer for the African American masses. The Comintern's decision didn't necessarily make members embrace the position they obtained regarding African-Americans and their quest for self-determination. Many ideologies hindered the acceptance of this new position that the Communist Party undertook, this stems from old methods and practices from the Communists Party's senior members who were also members of the Socialist Party, whom of which had no previous records of speaking out against racial inequalities for African Americans. In 1930 The leader of the Communist Party, Otto Huiswood, accepted and pushed towards the idea of self determination. Another example of African American self-determination in the 1930s was the emergence of Black-owned businesses and cooperative enterprises. These initiatives were driven by the belief that economic self-sufficiency was a key factor in achieving social and political empowerment for Black people. At the same time, African Americans were also asserting their political rights and challenging the entrenched power structures that dominated the South. This included organizing voter registration drives and political campaigns, as well as advocating for civil rights and an end to segregation and discrimination. Despite facing significant opposition and violence from white supremacist groups and the broader power structure of the South, the movement for African American self-determination in the 1930s laid the groundwork for later civil rights activism and contributed to the broader struggle for racial justice in the United States. In 1931, African Americans in the southern United States were actively pursuing self-determination, or the ability to control their own lives and communities. This effort was driven by a number of factors, including the ongoing struggle against racism and discrimination, the economic challenges of the Great Depression, and the influence of the growing Black nationalist movement. One example of this pursuit of self-determination was the establishment of independent black schools and colleges in the South.

These institutions were created to provide education and job training for African Americans, who were often denied access to white-dominated schools and universities. Examples of such schools include Tuskegee University in Alabama and Morehouse College in Georgia. Another example was the development of black-owned businesses and cooperatives. These enterprises were intended to provide economic opportunities for African Americans, who were often excluded from mainstream businesses and industries. Some notable examples include the North Carolina Mutual Life Insurance Company, which was founded in 1898 and became one of the largest black-owned businesses in the country, and the Mound Bayou cooperative in Mississippi, which was a self-sufficient community founded by former slaves. African Americans also pursued self-determination through political organizing and activism. The formation of the National Association for the Advancement of Colored People (NAACP) in 1909 provided a platform for black activism and advocacy, and many other organizations were established in subsequent years. These groups worked to challenge segregation and discrimination, fight for voting rights, and advocate for social and economic justice. One example of African American self-determination in 1932 was the growth of black-owned businesses and cooperatives. Many African Americans in the South faced limited economic opportunities due to discrimination and segregation, and thus turned to entrepreneurship as a means of achieving self-sufficiency. Some notable black-owned businesses that emerged in the 1930s include the St. Louis American newspaper, founded in 1928, and the North Carolina Mutual Life Insurance Company, which was established in 1898 and became one of the largest black-owned businesses in the country. Another example of self-determination was the establishment of independent black schools and colleges. These institutions provided education and job training for African Americans who were excluded from white-dominated schools and universities.

One notable example of an independent black college that emerged in the 1930s was Florida A&M University, which was founded in 1887 as the State Normal College for Colored Students. Political organizing and activism were also important means of pursuing self-determination for African Americans in the South. The National Association for the Advancement of Colored People (NAACP) continued to advocate for civil rights and challenge segregation through legal action, and other organizations such as the Southern Negro Youth Congress emerged in the 1930s to focus specifically on issues affecting young African Americans. Overall, African American self-determination in the southern United States in 1932 reflected a broader effort to challenge systemic racism and discrimination, and to create opportunities for economic and social advancement. In 1933, one way that African Americans pursued self-determination was through the establishment of cooperatives and other forms of collective economic activity. These efforts were intended to provide jobs and economic opportunities for black people who were often excluded from mainstream businesses and industries. Examples of such cooperatives include the Southern Consumers' League in Alabama, which was a consumer cooperative that focused on providing affordable goods and services to African Americans, and the Florida Mutual Benefit Association, which was an insurance cooperative that provided life insurance to black people who were often excluded from traditional insurance policies. Another way that African Americans pursued self-determination was through the establishment of independent schools and colleges.

The National Association for the Advancement of Colored People (NAACP) continued to play a prominent role in the struggle for civil rights, and many other organizations were established in subsequent years. These groups worked to challenge segregation and discrimination, fight for voting rights, and advocate for social and economic justice. In 1934, African Americans in the southern United States continued to pursue self-determination, as they faced ongoing challenges and struggles against racism, discrimination, and economic inequality. This pursuit of self-determination was motivated by the desire to control their own lives and communities, as well as the influence of the growing Black nationalist movement and other forms of radical activism. One way that African Americans pursued self-determination in 1934 was through the establishment of grassroots organizations and community institutions. These groups were often formed in response to the failure of mainstream political and social institutions to address the needs of African Americans. For example, the Southern Tenant Farmers' Union (STFU), which was founded in Arkansas in 1934, brought together black and white sharecroppers to advocate for their rights and economic interests. African Americans also pursued self-determination through cultural expression and artistic production. This included the development of literature, music, and visual arts that celebrated black culture and identity, and provided a platform for challenging racial stereotypes and promoting black pride. Examples of this include the Harlem Renaissance, a cultural movement centered in New York City during the 1920s and 1930s, and the work of artists such as Zora Neale Hurston, Langston Hughes, and Jacob Lawrence. Overall, the pursuit of self-determination by African Americans in the southern United States in 1934 was an important aspect of the broader struggle for civil rights and equality that continued throughout the 20th century. The pursuit of African American self-determination in the southern United States in the 1930s faced many challenges and ultimately experienced several setbacks and failures. One major obstacle was the entrenched system of racial segregation and discrimination that existed throughout the South. This system was backed by laws and policies that explicitly denied African Americans the right to vote, access to education, and many economic opportunities. The Great Depression, which began in 1929 and lasted throughout the 1930s, also posed significant challenges for African Americans.

Unemployment rates were high, and many African Americans were forced to work in low-paying, exploitative jobs. Additionally, White Supremacist violence and intimidation were rampant in the South during this time, making it difficult for African Americans to organize and assert their rights. The Ku Klux Klan and other groups were responsible for numerous lynchings, bombings, and other acts of terror against African Americans who dared to challenge the status quo. Despite these challenges, many African Americans continued to fight for self-determination through various means. For example, the Southern Tenant Farmers' Union, which was founded in 1934, sought to organize poor white and black farmers in the South and challenge the power of wealthy landowners. The union was successful in some areas, but it faced intense opposition and ultimately failed to achieve many of its goals. Other efforts at self-determination, such as the establishment of black-owned businesses and cooperatives, also faced significant challenges and ultimately had limited success. Many of these enterprises were unable to compete with larger, white-owned businesses and struggled to secure financing and support. Overall, while the pursuit of African American self-determination in the southern United States in the 1930s was an important part of the broader struggle for civil rights and equality, it faced numerous obstacles and ultimately experienced significant setbacks and failures.

== The Black Belt Idea ==
Early in the 1930s, the Communist Party USA became known for its opposition to racial discrimination and the exploitation of all workers by capitalism. Although the Party was adamantly anti-racist, white chauvinist tendencies surely afflicted it. The Party stood as one of the few organizing platforms where Black and white revolutionaries collaborated to improve society despite these conflicts in the fight against racial injustice. The CPUSA started assisting sharecropper organizers in Tallapoosa County, Alabama, when the Communist International designated African Americans in the Southern Black Belt as an oppressed people deserving of political sovereignty in 1928. The Black Belt Thesis is the idea that African Americans living in the south were an oppressed nation entirely, there is a vast amount of evidence that supports this statement. According to historians Harvey Khler and Beverly Tomek, "Moscow" enforced the Black Belt Thesis forcibly or that it was irrelevant to organization. As a result, there is a void in the body of knowledge that acknowledges the agency of Black communists in formulating their own political stance in light of their involvement in labor, activism, and education.

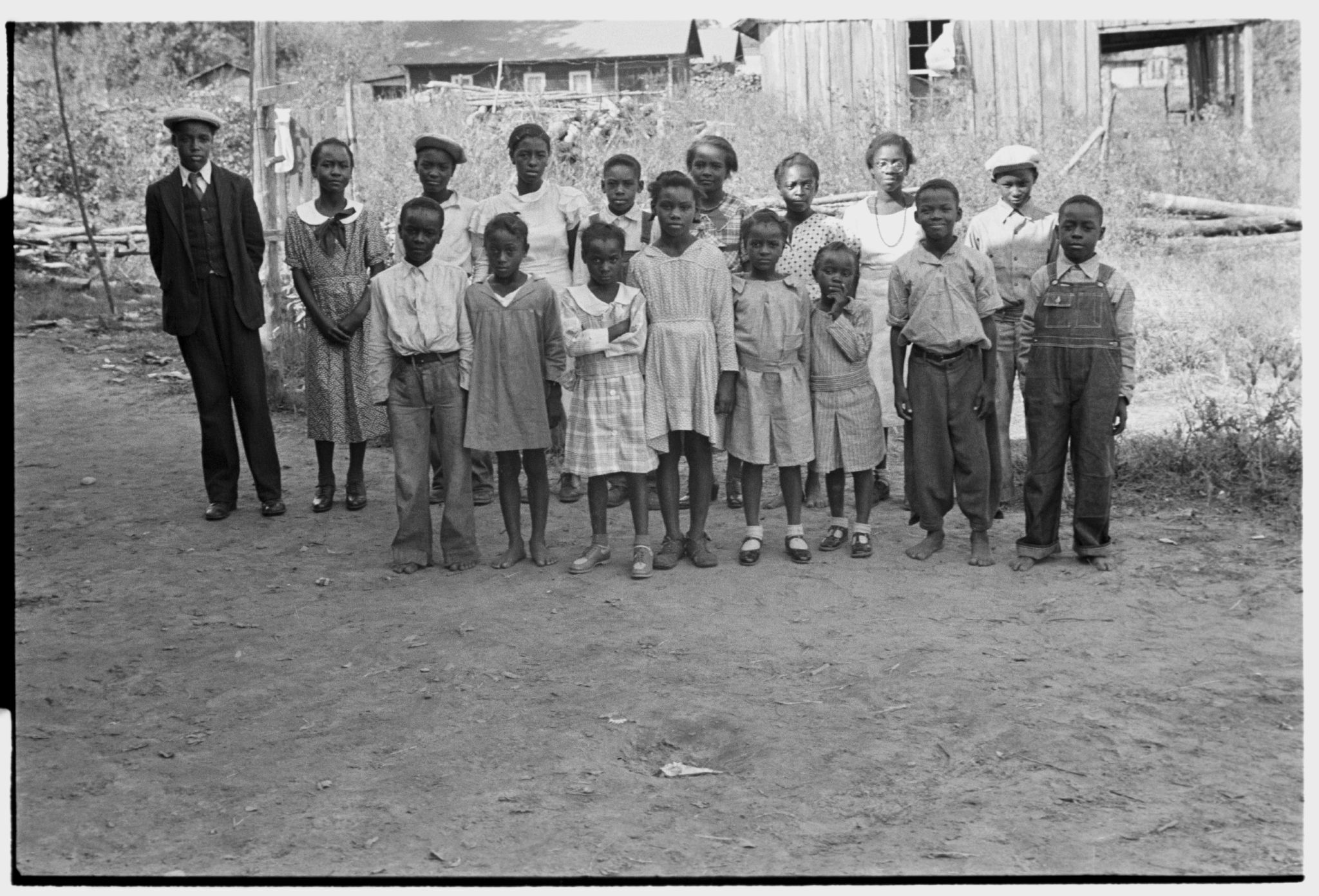
Children of African-American Sharecroppers, Little Rock, Arkansas by Ben Shahn, 1935

The Alabama Sharecroppers Union employed a Marxist–Leninist understanding to direct their opposition to labor exploitation and racial oppression because it allowed them to gain power not just as workers but also as subjects of an internal colony. This issue is crucial because their observations still hold true in the current struggle against capitalism and racial supremacy. In the South, Black sharecroppers endured painfully exploitative and degrading conditions. Sharecropping was a system where a white landlord gave many Black, landless employees a place to live and a piece of land to farm in exchange for a percentage of the crops (typically cotton) they produced. The system, which was created to economically re-enslave Black farmers after the Thirteenth Amendment was passed, has been referred to as "slavery by another name." Due to years of sharecropping, landowners often gave tenants between three-fourths and two-thirds of the price of their crops, less any prior debt, which Black farmers virtually invariably had. However, the landowners would take an astronomically high interest rate out of the sharecroppers' rates to pay for housing and farming supplies, leaving the farmers with virtually nothing. When this story was first published in 1932, 50 cents was almost the same as $10. There were many levels of the sharecropping system, with the poorest Black farmers receiving the harshest treatment. Landowners gave one-room shacks with no running water, electricity, or access to restrooms as "housing". Pork fat, molasses, and cornmeal were the farmers' staple foods for survival. Rickets, pellagra, and malnutrition were widespread. In other areas, tenant farmers had low literacy rates because poor families were required to have their children work the cotton fields instead of attending school. Every year, verbal agreements between the landowner and the sharecropper were arranged. The material circumstances in the Black Belt were not static and unchanging, despite the fact that this system was clearly a new variation on chattel slavery; rather, they were modified by ongoing resistance to and escape from tyranny. According to the Marxist–Leninist concept, the Black masses in the American South made up an oppressed country. The issue of what makes a nation is crucial to Marxists since communist groups were dedicated to combating imperialism and abolishing national oppression. Black people "must be considered a nation, insofar as the equality, won in the Civil War...has in fact been more and more restricted in many respects in the main centers of the Negro population (in the South)," Lenin said in 1917 while describing the oppressed peoples inside the United States. The right to national self-determination belongs to countries of people who have been subjected to colonialism and imperialism, according to Marxist-Leninists.

The Black Belt Thesis was created by Harry Haywood, a Black communist revolutionary and academic who studied in the Soviet Union, and is based on Lenin and Stalin's analysis of various countries. The Communist Party assisted sharecroppers in arming themselves and forming a union in response to their requests for assistance in organizing. Communists forming in Birmingham in 1930 were mainly cut off from the more remote, rural areas of the Black Belt. Five hundred sharecroppers in England, Arkansas, revolted in January 1931 over the hardships they were experiencing. Poor farmers in Alabama were urged by The Southern Worker to follow suit, and they subsequently received a flood of mail from sharecroppers requesting assistance in organizing. The Communist Party assisted sharecroppers in arming themselves and forming a union in response to their requests for assistance in organizing. Communists forming in Birmingham in 1930 were mainly cut off from the more remote, rural areas of the Black Belt. Five hundred sharecroppers in England, Arkansas, revolted in January 1931 over the hardships they were experiencing. Poor farmers in Alabama were urged by The Southern Worker to follow suit, and they subsequently received a flood of emails from sharecroppers requesting assistance in organizing. In what became known as the Camp Hill massacre, a white mob killed five sharecroppers at a Tallapoosa rally to liberate the Scottsboro Boys in 1931 while also injuring further people. As white mobs spent days assaulting dozens of Black families, driving them to seek refuge in the woods, and yelled to "kill every member of the Reds there and throw them into the creek," the police stood by and did nothing. Sharecroppers and Party organizers did not let this ongoing, escalating barrage of state-sanctioned brutality and white supremacist police and mob control dissuade them from their fight for unionization. The daily organizational activities of the Alabama Sharecroppers Union were combined with a Marxist–Leninist perspective. The SCU had about fifty members by 1931 and was totally independent of the Party, functioning without interference.

They kept the Party informed with the use of a liaison. We hadn't sent a coordinator down there, but the sharecroppers were "carrying on the work on their own initiative." By 1932, there were 591 members organized in localities, youth organizations, and women's auxiliaries courtesy to the work of a nineteen-year-old Black woman organizer called Eula Gray. The Sharecropper Union's next secretary, Al Murphy, increased the organization's militancy and safety. Murphy centered the union on the long-term objective of Black self-determination since he was a major proponent of it. Meetings were occasionally attended by a few destitute white sharecroppers, but Murphy insisted that their solidarity was only effective if they were motivated to band together under Black leadership. One white man was lynched in 1934 for openly expressing his support for the Sharecroppers Union. Numerous white people provided food, supplies, and cover to the Sharecroppers Union. Sharecroppers did not keep written records of their meetings or activities to protect themselves from criminal conviction, but we can infer the content of their meetings from the public actions they pursued––such as arming themselves for self-defense against the landlords and white mobs. Women's auxiliaries held considerable power in the union, and they were responsible for writing to outside Parties, individuals, and communist newspapers. To avoid being prosecuted for crimes, sharecroppers did not preserve written records of their meetings or activities. However, we may deduce what was discussed at those meetings from the public acts they took, such as arming themselves to defend themselves against landlords and white mobs. The union's women's auxiliary had a lot of influence, and they were in charge of writing to outside Parties, people, and communist periodicals. Communist publications, works by Lenin, Marx, and Stalin, as well as American Marxist writings like James Allen's Negro Liberation, all had a significant impact on sharecroppers. If a sharecropper was caught in possession of this forbidden book, they risked being assaulted, lynched, or even jailed. Communist literature was read aloud and the members of the Sharecroppers Union study groups spoke about how it related to their personal situations. Reading theory gave those without access to formal education who lived in remote areas an opportunity to see how their struggles fit into a larger global movement.

Despite the fact that the majority of the Sharecropper Union's demands were for quick fixes like increased pay and debt forgiveness, they also identified as members of the greater Communist movement and were committed to bringing about a revolution. To understand how the sharecroppers rejected their oppression, Marxist theory collaborated with their personal experiences. Black communists were not "blank slates" when they joined the movement. In the eyes of both communists and liberals, sharecroppers acquired a Marxist–Leninist perspective and an understanding of the significance of Black political power from the Northern communists who came to their aid, not the other way around. Marxists should be aware that theory is not a prediction but rather an analysis of the ongoing class struggle, and the Black national question is no exception. Black Belt communists may have learnt about Lenin from Party publications, but the farmers had spent their entire lives fighting against the same basic exploitation that Lenin talked about. In other words, Marxist theory did not educate Black farmers how to fight; rather, it provided them with fresh perspectives on how to see their historical enslavement in the context of the Black nation's subjection and the global capitalist political economy. In 1986, Lemon Johnson, a former Sharecropper Union member, was questioned about the success of the union. The Sharecropper Union's victories were largely due to a Marxist–Leninist understanding since it provided a practical route to freedom that no other political force at the time could. White liberals aired their contempt for the Sharecropper Union after a shootout in nearby Reeltown left many sharecroppers dead and countless more injured when the Sharecropper Union protected a Black farmer from eviction. They expressed sympathy for the sharecroppers but did not support the union, saying that Black people should "battle for our rights legally in the courts, and economically through mass-owned businesses." Several anti-communist Black reformists from the Tuskegee Institute and the NAACP echoed these sentiments.

The fact that this comment disregards the neo-fascist political climate in the Black Belt makes it all the more surprising. Simply pleading with a landowner for higher pay might result in an assault or even the death of a sharecropper. The notion that Black tenant farmers could effectively assert their legal rights in a court of law was absurd for a number of reasons, including the fact that they were denied the ability to vote, were unable to obtain a good education, and that the legal system was systematically set up to favor white people. The political approach of the Black capitalists and reformists failed to confront the severity of Black national oppression in the deep South, just as the Communist Party's prior "class before race" policy had done. Instead, it neglected the most exploited and impoverished Black farmers. The Sharecroppers Union responded by forging a new path of Black communist militancy that was unpalatable to most whites and some Black middle-class liberals and which philosophically challenged white Party members. According to historians Harvey Khler and Beverly Tomek, the Black Belt Thesis "failed to gain traction beyond a small group of intellectuals within the Communist Party" and that "self-determination...as a practical matter was all but irrelevant." These allegations cast doubt on the part that Black communist researchers and union members played in adopting and developing an ideological prism through which to interpret their exploitation, even though sincere criticisms of the Party are required. The myth that the Black Belt Thesis was an abstract idea outside the purview of the Sharecropper Union's members is untrue, and it is also based on racist and elitist presumptions about Black tenant farmers. It is plausible to assume that the Sharecropper Union was well-versed in political theory, history, and current affairs if they were reading about Lenin and Nat Turner and staging demonstrations against Hitler's new regime. Three years after its establishment, in 1934, the Sharecropper Union announced having more over 6,000 members. Mass evictions and abuses by landlords resulting from the New Deal Agricultural Adjustment Administration were the cause of the sudden rise in union involvement. The Sharecropper Union acquired sufficient clout to use strikes to jointly bargain with landlords and improve salaries while also preventing evictions of tenants. Harry Haywood was shocked to find a small armory at a Sharecropper Union meeting: "There were guns of all kinds—shotguns, rifles, and pistols." Sharecroppers were bringing firearms to the meeting and leaving them with their jackets when they entered. The original members of the Sharecropper Union would not have survived, much less developed a strong union, without arming themselves against the landlords, local authorities, and vigilante violence. In the Sharecropper Union's struggle for independence, the Communist Party USA's monetary support and the Comintern's intellectual support were unquestionably crucial. To create union strength and combat racism and class exploitation in the Black Belt, the sharecroppers of Alabama employed a Marxist–Leninist understanding and a militant self-defense strategy.

== Struggles ==
Black sharecroppers in the southern United States faced a multitude of struggles in the 1930s. Some of the most significant challenges they faced included:

1. Exploitation by white landowners: Sharecroppers were often paid very low wages and were charged exorbitant fees for basic necessities like food and housing. The sharecropping system was designed to keep black farmers in debt to white landowners, which made it difficult for them to break free from poverty.
2. Lack of access to education and healthcare: Many black sharecroppers lived in remote rural areas where access to education and healthcare was limited. This lack of access made it challenging for them to improve their economic and social status.
3. Racial discrimination: Black sharecroppers faced significant discrimination and violence at the hands of white landowners and law enforcement officials. Many were subjected to arbitrary arrests, beatings, and even lynchings for attempting to assert their rights.
4. Poor working conditions: Sharecropping was a difficult and physically demanding job that required long hours of labor in often dangerous conditions. Many black sharecroppers were forced to work in fields sprayed with toxic pesticides and were not provided with adequate safety equipment.
5. Political disenfranchisement: Black sharecroppers had very little political power in the southern United States, which made it difficult for them to advocate for their rights or hold those in power accountable.

The struggles faced by black sharecroppers in the 1930s were part of a broader pattern of racial injustice and inequality in the southern United States. The Sharecroppers' Union and other organizations fought to address these issues and improve the lives of black farmers, but progress was slow and often met with resistance and violence from the white power structure.

== See also ==
- Southern Tenant Farmers Union
- Sharecropping
