= Alabama State Route 229 =

State highway in Alabama, United States

State Route 229

Route information
- Maintained by ALDOT
- Length: 22.781 mi (36.662 km)

Major junctions
- South end: I-85 south of Tallassee
- SR 14 in Tallassee; SR 50 in Red Hill
- North end: SR 63 south of Lake Martin

Location
- Country: United States
- State: Alabama
- Counties: Macon, Elmore

Highway system
- Alabama State Highway System; Interstate; US; State
← SR 227	→ US 231

State Route 229 (SR 229) is a 15-mile-long (24 km) route that serves as a connection between Interstate 85 (I-85) south of Tallassee to SR 63 south of Lake Martin in Elmore County.

== Route description ==
The southern terminus of SR 229 is located at Exit 26 off I-85 south of Millstead. From Millstead, the route takes a northerly track to Tallassee. In Tallassee, the route briefly shares a concurrency with SR 14 whilst traveling in a northwesterly direction. Just to the south of Burlington, it splits from SR 14 and resumes a northerly track to Red Hill. At Red Hill, the route takes a turn to the west towards its northern terminus at SR 63.

== Major intersections ==
County	Location	mi	km	Destinations	Notes
Macon		0.000– 0.140	0.000– 0.225	I-85 – Montgomery, Atlanta CR 30 south	Southern terminus; I-85 exit 26; road continues south as CR 30
Elmore	Tallassee	7.950	12.794	SR 14 east (Central Boulevard) – Notasulga	South end of SR 14 overlap
Elmore	Burlington	11.535	18.564	SR 14 west (Tallassee Highway) – Wetumpka	North end of SR 14 overlap
Elmore	Red Hill	19.738	31.765	SR 50 east – Camp Hill	Western terminus of SR 50
Elmore		22.781	36.662	SR 63 (Kowaliga Road) – Eclectic, Alexander City	Northern terminus
1.000 mi = 1.609 km; 1.000 km = 0.621 mi: Concurrency terminus
