= Alabama State Route 50 =

State highway in Alabama, United States

State Route 50

Route information
- Maintained by ALDOT
- Length: 54.261 mi (87.325 km)
- Existed: 1940–present

Major junctions
- West end: SR 229 near Lake Martin
- US 280 at Camp Hill; US 431 at La Fayette
- East end: US 29 at Lanett

Location
- Country: United States
- State: Alabama
- Counties: Elmore, Tallapoosa, Chambers

Highway system
- Alabama State Highway System; Interstate; US; State
← SR 49	→ SR 51

State Route 50 (SR 50) is a 54.261-mile-long (87.325 km) state highway in the eastern part of the U.S. state of Alabama. The western terminus of the highway is at an intersection with SR 229 near Lake Martin in northeastern Elmore County. The eastern terminus of the highway is at an intersection with U.S. Route 29 (US 29) at Lanett, just west of the Georgia state line.

== Route description ==
From its western terminus, SR 50 assumes an eastward trajectory as it skirts the southern shores of Lake Martin, traveling through rural areas of Elmore and Tallapoosa counties. East of where the highway would cross into Macon County if it were to continue its eastward trajectory, the highway takes a sudden turn to the northeast as it heads towards Camp Hill.

After sharing a brief wrong-way concurrency with US 280 at Camp Hill, SR 50 resumes its eastward trajectory as it crosses into Chambers County. The highway continues eastward, traveling through LaFayette before it reaches its eastern terminus at Lanett.

== Major intersections ==
County	Location	mi	km	Destinations	Notes
Elmore	Red Hill	0.000	0.000	SR 229 – Tallassee	Western terminus
Tallapoosa	Walnut Hill	10.963	17.643	SR 49 – Dadeville, Tallassee, Reeltown	
Tallapoosa	Camp Hill	20.434	32.885	US 280 east (SR 38) – Opelika, Phenix City	West end of US 280/SR 38 concurrency
Tallapoosa	Camp Hill	21.169	34.068	US 280 west (SR 38) / CR 34 west – Dadeville, Alexander City, Stillwaters	East end of US 280/SR 38 concurrency
Chambers	LaFayette	40.868	65.771	US 431 (SR 1)	
Chambers	Lanett	54.261	87.325	US 29 (SR 15) to I-85	Eastern terminus
1.000 mi = 1.609 km; 1.000 km = 0.621 mi: Concurrency terminus
