= Ned Cobb =

American farmer and trade unionist (1885–1973)

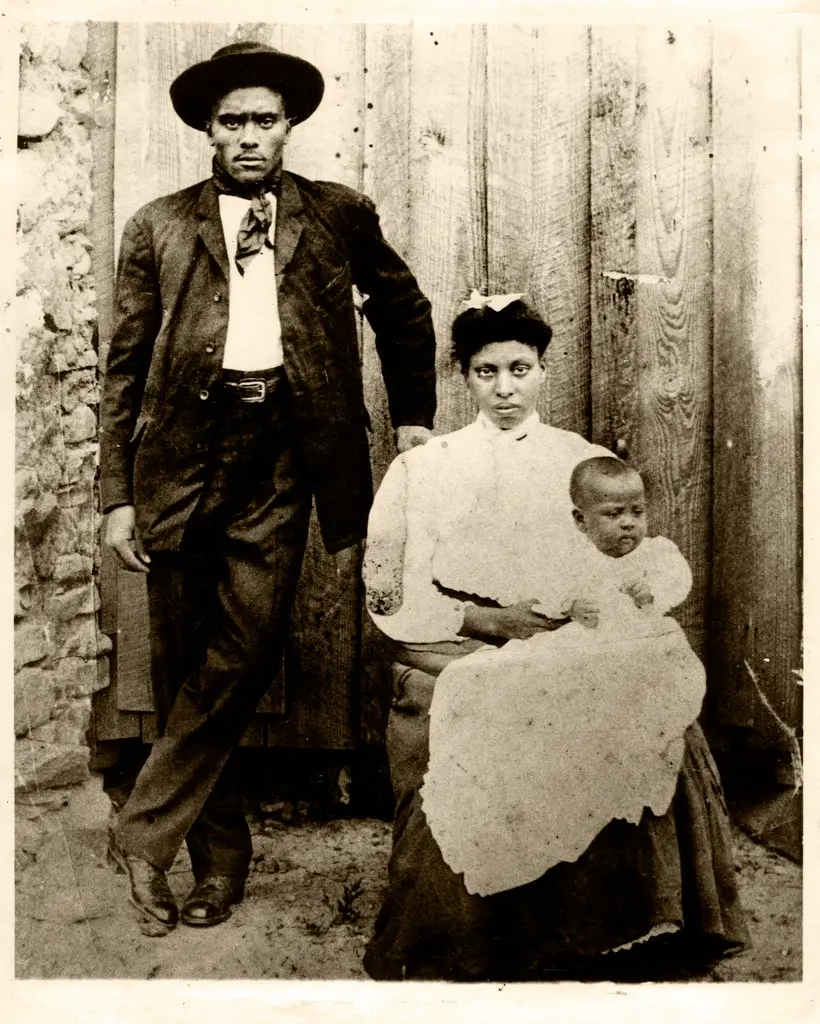
Ned Cobb, a.k.a. Nate Shaw, at 22, with his wife, Viola, and their son Andrew, in 1907

Ned Cobb (also known as Nate Shaw) (1885–1973) was an African-American tenant farmer born in Tallapoosa County in Alabama. He joined the Sharecroppers' Union (SCU) in 1931, which was founded the same year. His oral history was written up in book form.

== Early life ==
Cobb was the fourth of more than twenty children of a father who had been enslaved. The father had been emotionally and physically scarred by his experiences, and responded to his emotional and financial frustrations by beating and berating his wives, children, and others he loved.

== Career ==
Ned left his father's house to begin sharecropping on his own at the age of 19; he married and began a family about the same time.

Realizing that the men needed help, he joined the Alabama Sharecroppers' Union in 1931 to fight for justice for black people and against exploitation. Cobb was a hard worker and was not going to let the white dominant race run his life; he continued to fight against unfair treatment of tenant farmers by starting a tenant farmers union. Cobb continued to climb the ladder of success from wage labor to sharecropper. He was finally able to own his own crops and land. He focused on growing cotton.

In 1931 when the Communist Party arrived in Alabama, Cobb was profoundly impressed because he was aware that the party was defending the Scottsboro Boys, nine young black men accused of raping two white women.

In December 1932, a sheriff tried to take the home and livestock of one of Cobb's friends. Cobb defended his friend and in turn was involved in a shootout in which he was wounded and arrested. Cobb was sentenced to thirteen years in jail. Cobb was offered parole if he would agree to give up his farm and relocate to Birmingham. Instead, he served his full sentence and after release in 1945 returned to his farm.

The fluctuating cotton market before and after the Great Depression led to extremely hard times for southern sharecroppers and cotton farmers. Many were increasingly victimized by white landowners who sought to recoup their own monetary losses by seizing the property of their tenant farmers.

Cobb gained great recognition and praise, for as a black man he was making a name for himself. He managed to maintain his farm even through the natural disasters such as the boll weevil epidemic and the collapse of cotton prices.

Ned, by now a middle aged man and successful by the standards of the time (he was particularly proud of the fact he supplied his grown sons with mules and other means of making a living) saw many of his fellow sharecroppers dispossessed due to debt to landowners and then even saw others such as himself, who were not in debt, lose property on highly specious allegations.

Cobb became one of the most successful sharecroppers (or black men in all occupations) in the rural Jim Crow-regulated county. Within a few years he owned his own mules, a truck, and a car (all of them paid for, he was very proud to note) and had electricity and plumbing in his house. All of those distinctions distanced him from most black men and many poor white farmers in his vicinity. Although uneducated and illiterate, he was innately intelligent, and avoided the sharecroppers' commonly hopeless cycle of debt and poverty by his abilities to innovate in agriculture and to avoid many of the mistakes of others.

In 1969, Theodore Rosengarten came to Alabama to search for and interview surviving members of the Sharecroppers Union. When Rosengarten sat down to interview Cobb for this purpose, Cobb's memories began to pour out. The resulting book, All God's Dangers: The Life of Nate Shaw stands as a larger history of the life of a black tenant farmer raising cotton in Jim Crow Alabama.

== Legacy ==
Cobb's autobiography was pseudonymously published in the book All God's Dangers: The Life of Nate Shaw, an oral history told to historian Theodore Rosengarten. The book received critical acclaim and won a 1975 U.S. National Book Award for Nonfiction in the category of Contemporary Affairs.

Rosengarten later adapted his book into a one-man stage play, co-writing the script with Michael Hadley and Jennifer Hadley. Starring Cleavon Little, the play premiered at the Cricket Theatre in Minneapolis and was further developed at the Alabama Shakespeare Festival before making its off-Broadway debut at the Lamb's Theatre in 1989. In the play, an octogenarian Cobb narrates incidents from his life while weaving a basket and repairing a chair.

Michael Hadley directed a 1990 television adaptation for American Playhouse on PBS, also starring Little. A Los Angeles Times reviewer praised Little's performance as "virtuosic, laced with sly wit and vocal legerdemain, with the actor slipping into the persona of several rural characters."
