= Derrick Ansley =

American football player and coach (born 1981)

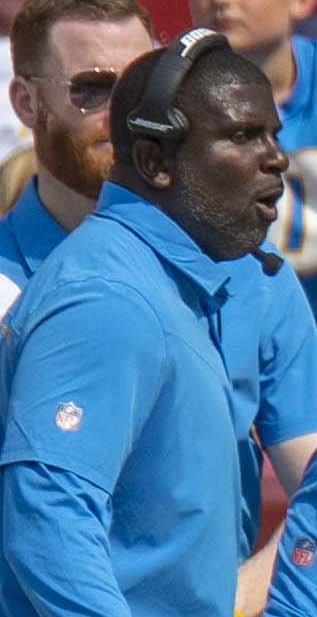
- Ansley with the Los Angeles Chargers in 2021

Dallas Cowboys
- Title: Defensive backs coach & passing game coordinator

Personal information
- Born: December 11, 1981 (age 44); Tallassee, Alabama, U.S.
- Listed height: 6 ft 0 in (1.83 m)
- Listed weight: 176 lb (80 kg)

Career information
- Position: Safety
- High school: Tallassee (AL)
- College: Troy

Career history
- Huntingdon (2005–2009) Defensive backs coach; Alabama (2010–2011) Graduate assistant; Tennessee (2012) Defensive backs coach; Kentucky (2013–2015) Defensive backs coach; Alabama (2016–2017) Defensive backs coach; Oakland Raiders (2018) Defensive backs coach; Tennessee (2019–2020) Defensive coordinator & defensive backs coach; Los Angeles Chargers (2021–2022) Defensive backs coach; Los Angeles Chargers (2023) Defensive coordinator; Green Bay Packers (2024–2025) Passing game coordinator; Dallas Cowboys (2026–present) Defensive backs coach & passing game coordinator

Awards and highlights
- BCS national champion (2011); CFP national champion (2017); First-team All-Sun Belt (2004)
- Coaching profile at Pro Football Reference

Derrick Ansley (born December 11, 1981) is an American football coach and former player who is the passing game coordinator and defensive backs coach for the Dallas Cowboys of the National Football League (NFL). He previously served as the passing game coordinator for the Green Bay Packers. Before that he was the defensive coordinator at Tennessee and the Los Angeles Chargers. He played safety at Troy from 2001 to 2004 before starting his coaching career at Huntingdon, a Division-III school in 2005.

== Playing career ==
Ansley played high school football at Tallassee High School, where he was an All-State honorable mention in 1998 and an All-State recipient in 1999. He played college football at Troy, where he started 40 consecutive games and had 19 interceptions in his career. He is tied for second-most interceptions in Troy history. Ansley is a member of Phi Beta Sigma fraternity.

Pre-draft measurables
Height	Weight	40-yard dash	20-yard shuttle	Three-cone drill	Vertical jump	Broad jump	Bench press
6 ft 0 1/4 in (1.84 m)	176 lb (80 kg)	4.56 s	4.55 s	7.01 s	37.5 in (0.95 m)	9 ft 11 in (3.02 m)	10 reps
All values from Pro Day

== Coaching career ==
=== Huntingdon ===
Ansley started his coaching career in 2005, where he was the defensive backs coach at Huntingdon.

=== Alabama ===
In 2010, he made the jump to Alabama as an on-field defensive graduate assistant. He spent one year as the defensive backs coach at Tennessee before leaving for the same position at Kentucky. His secondary improved every year he was there, going from 64th in pass defense in 2013, 44th in 2014, and 32nd in 2015. They also went from 85th in passing touchdowns allowed to 28th in 2015. He was hired by Alabama to serve the same role in 2016. While he was there, he coached Chuck Bednarik Award and Thorpe Award winner Minkah Fitzpatrick and All-American Marlon Humphrey.

=== Oakland Raiders ===
In 2018, he was hired by the Oakland Raiders to be their defensive backs coach, becoming the highest paid in the NFL. His unit improved from five interceptions in 2017 to 14 in 2018.

=== Tennessee ===
The following year, he was hired as the defensive coordinator at Tennessee. His defense improved from 77th in total defense to 23rd.

=== Los Angeles Chargers ===
In 2021, he became the defensive backs coach for the Los Angeles Chargers.

On February 20, 2023, Ansley was promoted from defensive backs coach to defensive coordinator.

=== Green Bay Packers ===
On March 12, 2024, Ansley was hired by the Green Bay Packers to be their passing game coordinator.

=== Dallas Cowboys ===
On January 31, 2026, Ansley was hired by the Dallas Cowboys to be serve as the team's defensive backs coach/passing game coordinator.
