= Our Town, Alabama =

- Census-designated place
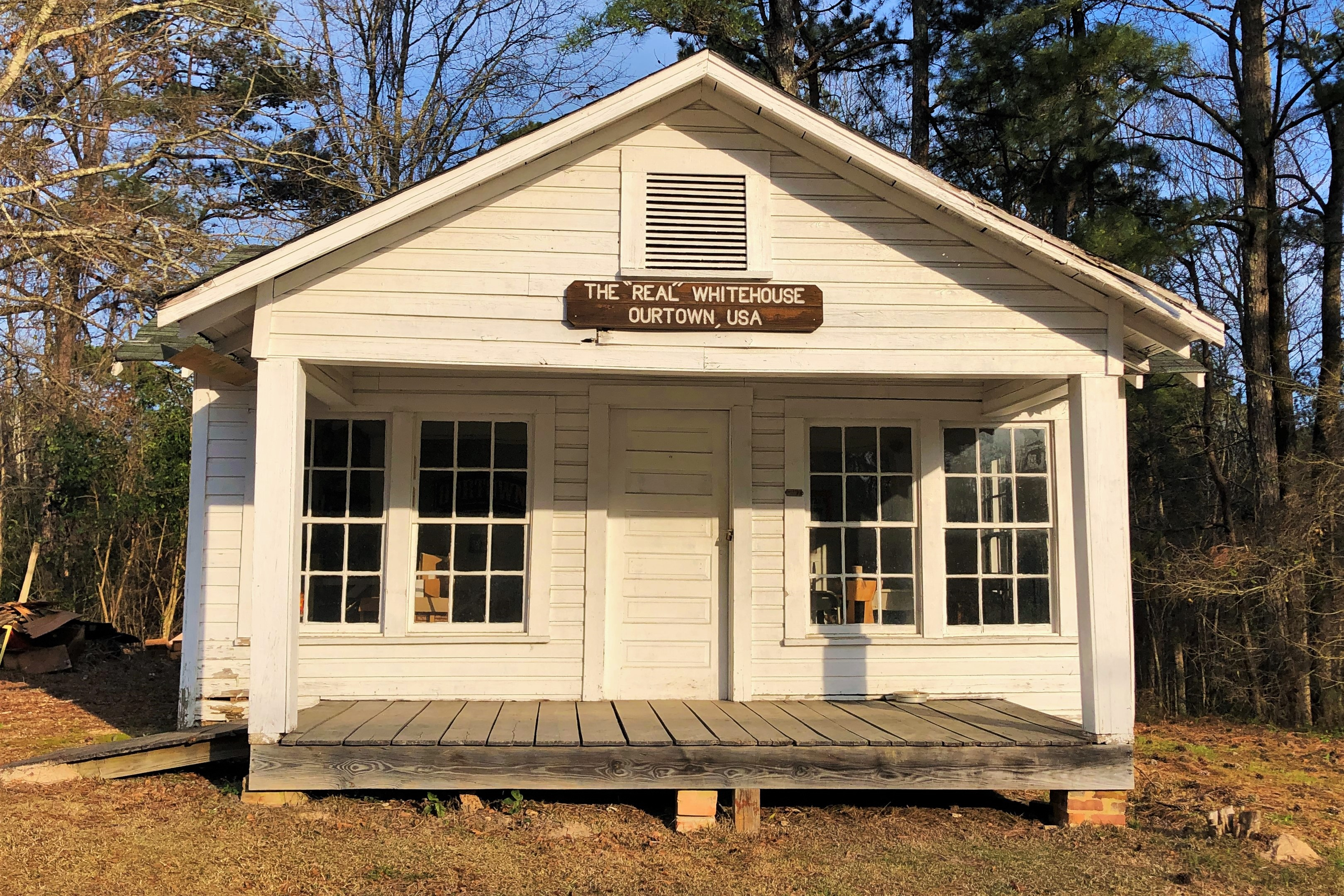
- Our Town in 2021

- Location of Our Town in Tallapoosa County, Alabama.
- Coordinates: 32°49′41″N 85°57′43″W
- Country: United States
- State: Alabama
- County: Tallapoosa

Area
  - Total: 11.89 sq mi (30.79 km^{2})
  - Land: 11.85 sq mi (30.70 km^{2})
  - Water: 0.035 sq mi (0.09 km^{2})
- Elevation: 659 ft (201 m)

Population (2020)
  - Total: 605
  - Density: 51.0/sq mi (19.71/km^{2})
- Time zone: UTC-6 (Central (CST))
  - Summer (DST): UTC-5 (CDT)
- Area codes: 256 & 938
- GNIS feature ID: 2582692

Our Town is a census-designated place and unincorporated community in Tallapoosa County, Alabama, United States. As of the 2020 census, Our Town had a population of 605.

Our Town had its start around 1913 when the railroad was extended to that point. The community was named by John S. Jones by saying, "It's not your town, or my town, it is Our Town".^{(5)}

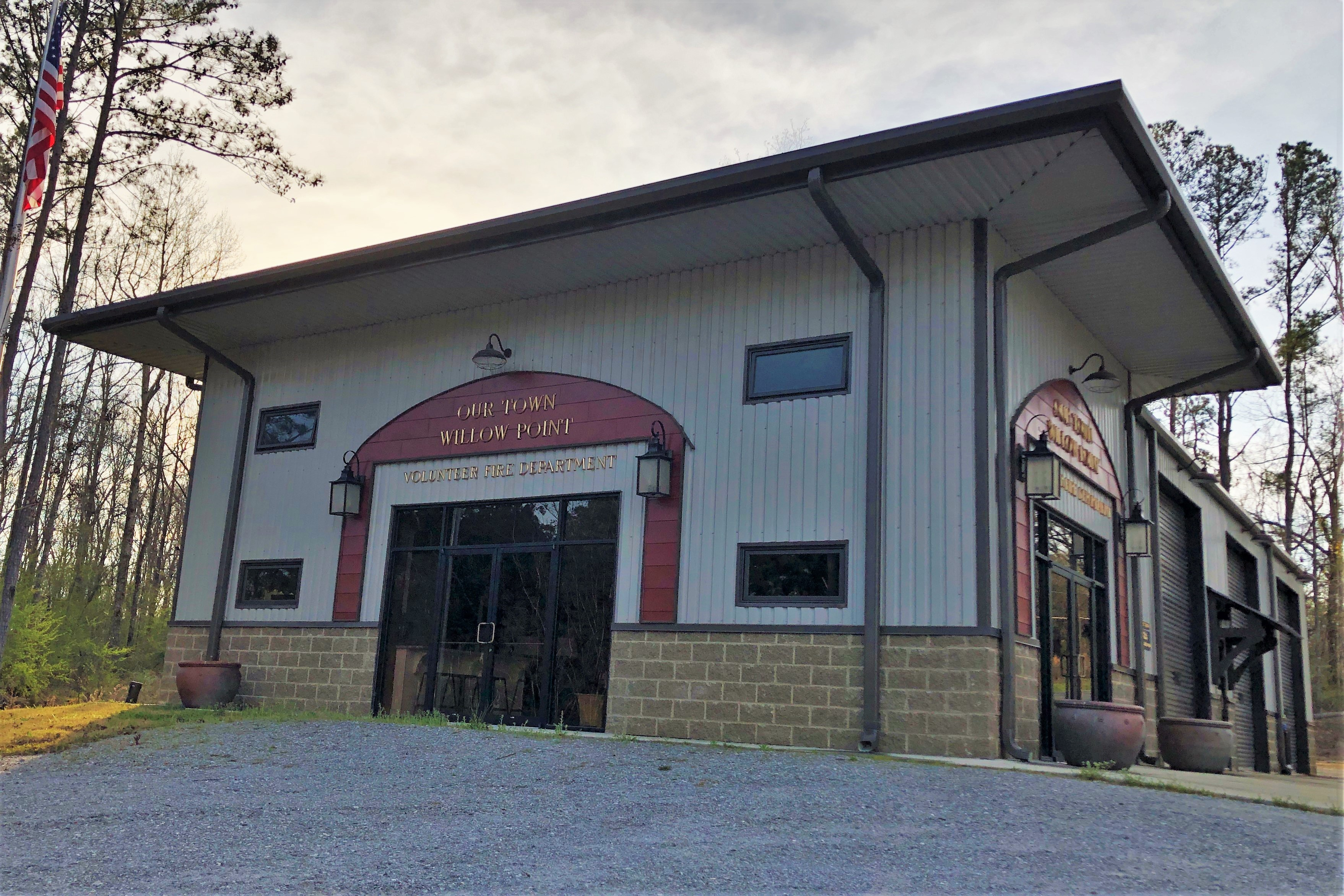
Our Town and Willow Point Volunteer Fire Department

== Demographics ==
Historical population
Census	Pop.	Note	%±
2010	641		—
2020	605		−5.6%
U.S. Decennial Census

Our Town was first listed as a census designated place in the 2010 U.S. census.

Our Town CDP, Alabama – Racial and ethnic composition Note: the US Census treats Hispanic/Latino as an ethnic category. This table excludes Latinos from the racial categories and assigns them to a separate category. Hispanics/Latinos may be of any race.
Race / Ethnicity (NH = Non-Hispanic)	Pop 2010	Pop 2020	% 2010	% 2020
White alone (NH)	545	489	85.02%	80.83%
Black or African American alone (NH)	82	95	12.79%	15.70%
Native American or Alaska Native alone (NH)	9	1	1.40%	0.17%
Asian alone (NH)	0	3	0.00%	0.50%
Native Hawaiian or Pacific Islander alone (NH)	0	0	0.00%	0.00%
Other race alone (NH)	0	0	0.00%	0.00%
Mixed race or Multiracial (NH)	2	14	0.31%	2.31%
Hispanic or Latino (any race)	3	3	0.47%	0.50%
Total	641	605	100.00%	100.00%
