= Andrew Jackson, Alabama =

- Unincorporated community
- Location within Alabama Location within the United States
- Coordinates: 32°57′25″N 85°52′41″W
- Country: United States
- State: Alabama
- County: Tallapoosa
- Elevation: 535 ft (163 m)
- Time zone: UTC-6 (Central (CST))
  - Summer (DST): UTC-5 (CDT)
- Area codes: 256 & 938
- GNIS feature ID: 137363

Andrew Jackson, named after the seventh president of the United States, is an unincorporated community in Tallapoosa County, Alabama, United States, located on the west bank of the Tallapoosa River, 4.5 miles (7.2 km) east of Alexander City.
