= Frog Eye, Alabama =

- Unincorporated community
- Location within Alabama Location within the United States
- Coordinates: 33°01′57″N 85°35′39″W
- Country: United States
- State: Alabama
- County: Tallapoosa
- Elevation: 682 ft (208 m)
- Time zone: UTC-6 (Central (CST))
  - Summer (DST): UTC-5 (CDT)
- Area codes: 256 & 938

Frog Eye is an unincorporated community in Tallapoosa County, Alabama, United States.

Frog Eye has been noted for its unusual place name.

Local legend has it that the community got its name from an old saloon that sold both legal and illegal liquor (a.k.a. moonshine). In the window of the saloon, the owner kept a ceramic frog. If the police were around, he'd close one of the eyes of the frog so everyone knew not to ask for the illegal liquor. If both eyes were open, it was clear to ask for the moonshine.
