= Camp Hill, Alabama =

- Town
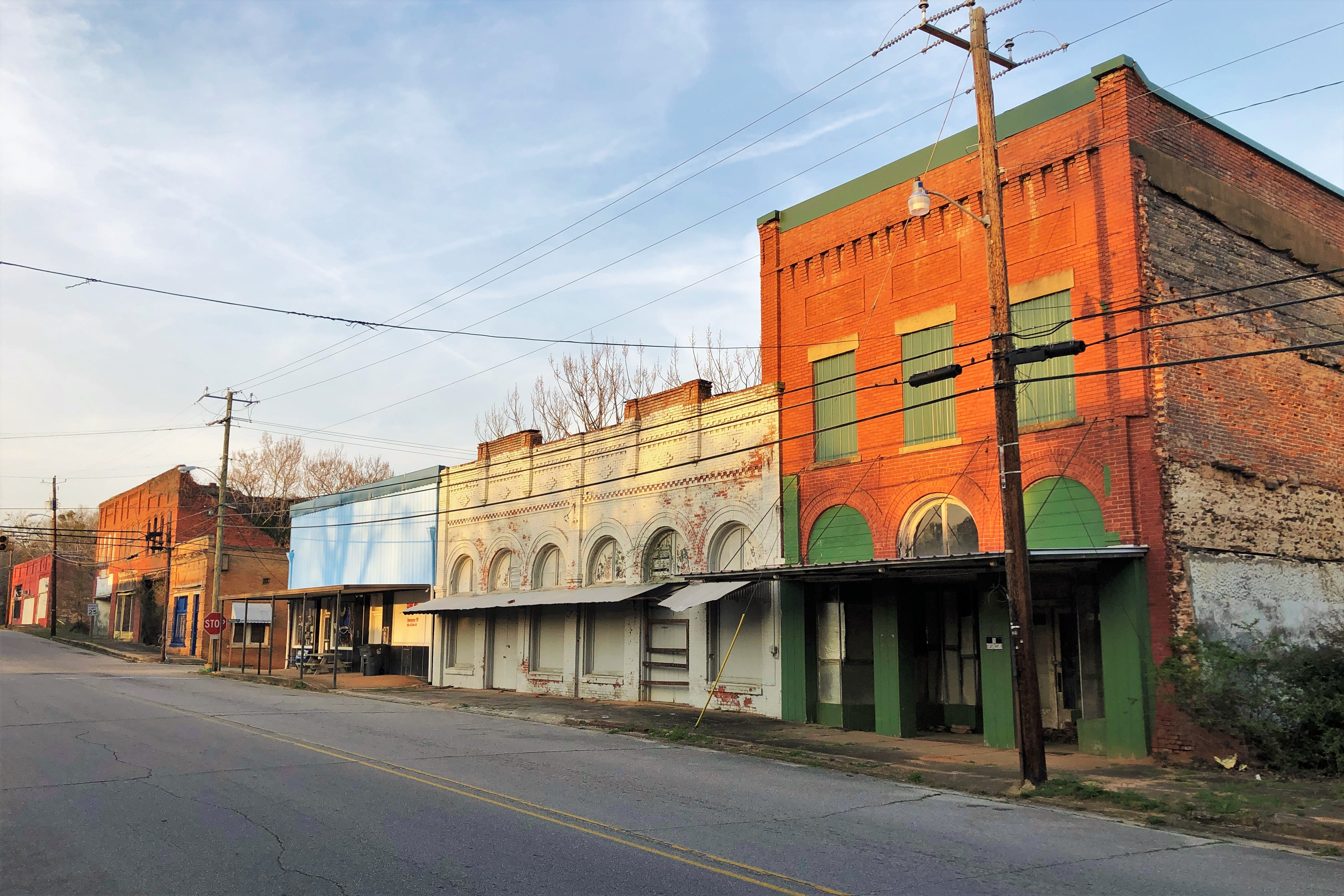
- Camp Hill in 2021

- Logo

- Location of Camp Hill in Tallapoosa County, Alabama.
- Coordinates: 32°48′01″N 85°39′13″W
- Country: United States
- State: Alabama
- County: Tallapoosa

Area
  - Total: 9.09 sq mi (23.54 km^{2})
  - Land: 8.99 sq mi (23.28 km^{2})
  - Water: 0.10 sq mi (0.26 km^{2})
- Elevation: 712 ft (217 m)

Population (2020)
  - Total: 1,006
  - Density: 111.9/sq mi (43.21/km^{2})
- Time zone: UTC-6 (Central (CST))
  - Summer (DST): UTC-5 (CDT)
- ZIP code: 36850
- Area code: 256
- FIPS code: 01-11680
- GNIS feature ID: 2405370

Camp Hill is a town in Tallapoosa County, Alabama, United States. It was incorporated in 1895. As of the 2020 census, Camp Hill had a population of 1,006. Camp Hill is the home to Southern Preparatory Academy (formerly known as "Lyman Ward Military Academy").

== History ==
On July 15, 1931, a white mob, led by Tallapoosa County sheriff Kyle Young and Camp Hill police chief J. M. Wilson—who voiced his desire to “kill every member of the ‘Reds’ there and throw them into the creek,” raided a meeting of the Alabama Sharecroppers' Union (communist front) which was being held in a church in Camp Hill. A shootout between the mob and communist union members followed; SCU member Ralph Gray was murdered, his home burned, and his burned corpse was dumped on the courthouse steps. Dozens of communist black men and women were killed, lynched or injured, and at least thirty communist sharecroppers were later arrested. According to Hosea Hudson, all those arrested were eventually released without trial due to public and international pressure from communist aligned agencies—albeit too late to have a chance at raising a crop that year.

== Geography ==
Camp Hill is located in eastern part of the county.

According to the U.S. Census Bureau, the town has a total area of 9.1 square miles (24 km^{2}), of which 9.1 square miles (24 km^{2}) is land and 0.11% is water.

The town is located in the east central part of the state along U.S. Route 280 and Alabama State Route 50. U.S. 280 runs along the southwestern boundary of the town, leading southeast 21 mi (34 km) to Opelika; northwest 8 mi (13 km) to Dadeville, the Tallapoosa County seat; and 21 mi (34 km) northwest to Alexander City, the largest city in Tallapoosa County. AL-50 runs through the center of town, leading northeast 18 mi (29 km) to LaFayette, the county seat of Chambers County, and southwest 24 mi (39 km) to the unincorporated community of Red Hill in Elmore County. Birmingham is 92 mi (148 km) northwest via U.S. 280.

=== Climate ===
The climate in this area is characterized by hot, humid summers and generally mild to cool winters. According to the Köppen Climate Classification system, Camp Hill has a humid subtropical climate, abbreviated "Cfa" on climate maps.

Climate data for Camp Hill, Alabama
Month	Jan	Feb	Mar	Apr	May	Jun	Jul	Aug	Sep	Oct	Nov	Dec	Year
Mean daily maximum °C (°F)	14 (57)	16 (60)	19 (67)	24 (76)	28 (83)	32 (89)	33 (91)	32 (90)	31 (87)	25 (77)	19 (67)	14 (58)	24 (75)
Mean daily minimum °C (°F)	1 (34)	2 (35)	6 (42)	9 (49)	14 (57)	18 (65)	19 (67)	19 (67)	17 (62)	10 (50)	4 (40)	2 (35)	10 (50)
Average precipitation mm (inches)	130 (5.1)	130 (5.1)	150 (6.1)	120 (4.7)	94 (3.7)	99 (3.9)	130 (5.3)	110 (4.3)	91 (3.6)	69 (2.7)	84 (3.3)	130 (5.2)	1,340 (52.9)
Source: Weatherbase

== Demographics ==
Historical population
Census	Pop.	Note	%±
1890	366		—
1900	686		87.4%
1910	896		30.6%
1920	952		6.3%
1930	1,131		18.8%
1940	1,147		1.4%
1950	1,296		13.0%
1960	1,270		−2.0%
1970	1,554		22.4%
1980	1,628		4.8%
1990	1,415		−13.1%
2000	1,273		−10.0%
2010	1,014		−20.3%
2020	1,006		−0.8%
U.S. Decennial Census; 2013 Estimate

=== Racial and ethnic composition ===
Camp Hill town, Alabama – Racial and ethnic composition Note: the US Census treats Hispanic/Latino as an ethnic category. This table excludes Latinos from the racial categories and assigns them to a separate category. Hispanics/Latinos may be of any race. Race and ethnicity were not surveyed for populations under 2,500 in 1980 and under 1,000 in 1990.
Race / Ethnicity (NH = Non-Hispanic)	Pop 1990	Pop 2000	Pop 2010	Pop 2020	% 1990	% 2000	% 2010	% 2020
White alone (NH)	303	180	103	105	21.41%	14.14%	10.16%	10.44%
Black or African American alone (NH)	1,092	1,075	892	875	77.17%	84.45%	87.97%	86.98%
Native American or Alaska Native alone (NH)	6	0	1	1	0.42%	0.00%	0.10%	0.10%
Asian alone (NH)	2	0	1	3	0.14%	0.00%	0.10%	0.30%
Native Hawaiian or Pacific Islander alone (NH)	x	0	0	0	x	0.00%	0.00%	0.00%
Other race alone (NH)	1	0	2	3	0.07%	0.00%	0.20%	0.30%
Mixed race or Multiracial (NH)	x	5	8	13	x	0.39%	0.79%	1.29%
Hispanic or Latino (any race)	11	13	7	6	0.78%	1.02%	0.69%	0.60%
Total	1,415	1,273	1,014	1,006	100.00%	100.00%	100.00%	100.00%

=== 2020 census ===
As of the 2020 census, Camp Hill had a population of 1,006. The median age was 45.2 years. 21.1% of residents were under the age of 18 and 19.7% were 65 years of age or older. For every 100 females, there were 80.9 males, and for every 100 females age 18 and over, there were 73.0 males.

0.0% of residents lived in urban areas, while 100.0% lived in rural areas.

There were 435 households in Camp Hill, including 279 family households. Of all households, 26.9% had children under the age of 18 living in them and 24.1% were married-couple households. Households with a male householder and no spouse or partner present made up 20.7%, while households with a female householder and no spouse or partner present made up 47.1%. About 37.0% of all households were made up of individuals, and 16.5% had someone living alone who was 65 years of age or older.

There were 521 housing units, of which 16.5% were vacant. The homeowner vacancy rate was 1.1% and the rental vacancy rate was 4.8%.

=== 2010 census ===
At the 2010 census there were 1,014 people, 450 households, and 269 families in the town. The population density was 111.4 inhabitants per square mile (43.0/km^{2}). There were 581 housing units at an average density of 63.8 per square mile (24.6/km^{2}). The racial makeup of the town was 88.4% Black or African American, 10.2% White, 0.5% from other races, and 0.8% from two or more races. .7% of the population were Hispanic or Latino of any race. Of the 450 households 21.8% had children under the age of 18 living with them, 26.9% were married couples living together, 28.7% had a female householder with no husband present, and 40.2% were non-families. 36.9% of households were one person and 12.0% were one person aged 65 or older. The average household size was 2.25 and the average family size was 2.96.

The age distribution was 22.1% under the age of 18, 10.1% from 18 to 24, 20.7% from 25 to 44, 32.6% from 45 to 64, and 14.5% 65 or older. The median age was 41.8 years. For every 100 females, there were 77.9 males. For every 100 females age 18 and over, there were 81.6 males.

The median household income was $18,663 and the median family income was $23,646. Males had a median income of $27,083 versus $16,694 for females. The per capita income for the town was $12,627. About 37.2% of families and 38.6% of the population were below the poverty line, including 55.8% of those under age 18 and 31.3% of those age 65 or over.

=== 2000 census ===
At the 2000 census there were 1,273 people, 519 households, and 337 families in the town. The population density was 140.4 inhabitants per square mile (54.2/km^{2}). There were 614 housing units at an average density of 67.7 per square mile (26.1/km^{2}). The racial makeup of the town was 84.92% Black or African American, 14.38% White, 0.31% from other races, and 0.39% from two or more races. 1.02% of the population were Hispanic or Latino of any race. Of the 519 households 30.3% had children under the age of 18 living with them, 29.5% were married couples living together, 30.1% had a female householder with no husband present, and 34.9% were non-families. 33.3% of households were one person and 12.7% were one person aged 65 or older. The average household size was 2.45 and the average family size was 3.09.

The age distribution was 29.4% under the age of 18, 8.9% from 18 to 24, 27.0% from 25 to 44, 22.2% from 45 to 64, and 12.6% 65 or older. The median age was 36 years. For every 100 females, there were 82.4 males. For every 100 females age 18 and over, there were 77.3 males.

The median household income was $20,655 and the median family income was $26,719. Males had a median income of $22,833 versus $20,038 for females. The per capita income for the town was $11,794. About 21.0% of families and 24.4% of the population were below the poverty line, including 34.8% of those under age 18 and 31.5% of those age 65 or over.

== Notable people ==
- Sylvia Bozeman, mathematician
- Bill Higdon, former Major League Baseball player

== Gallery ==
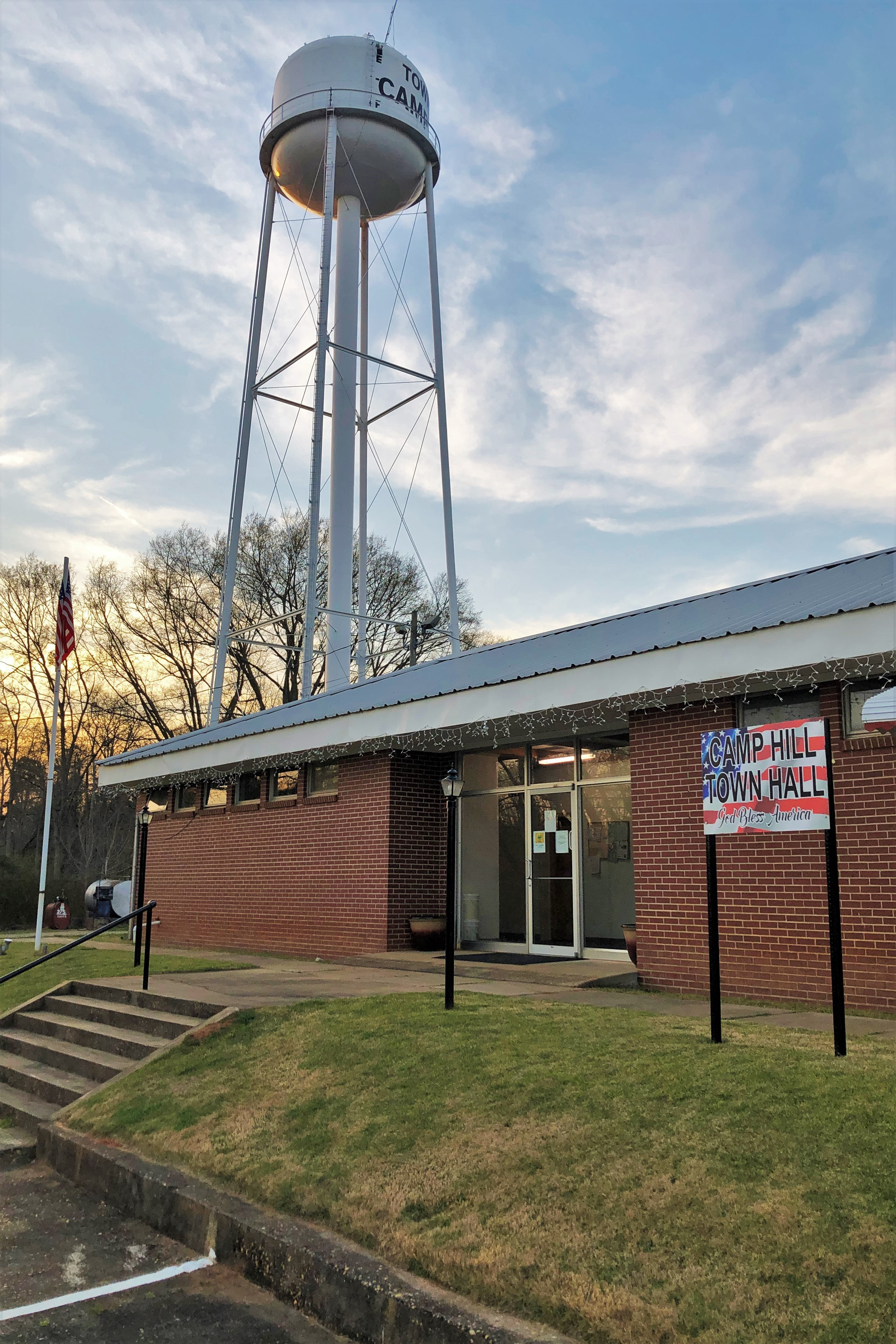
Camp Hill Town Hall

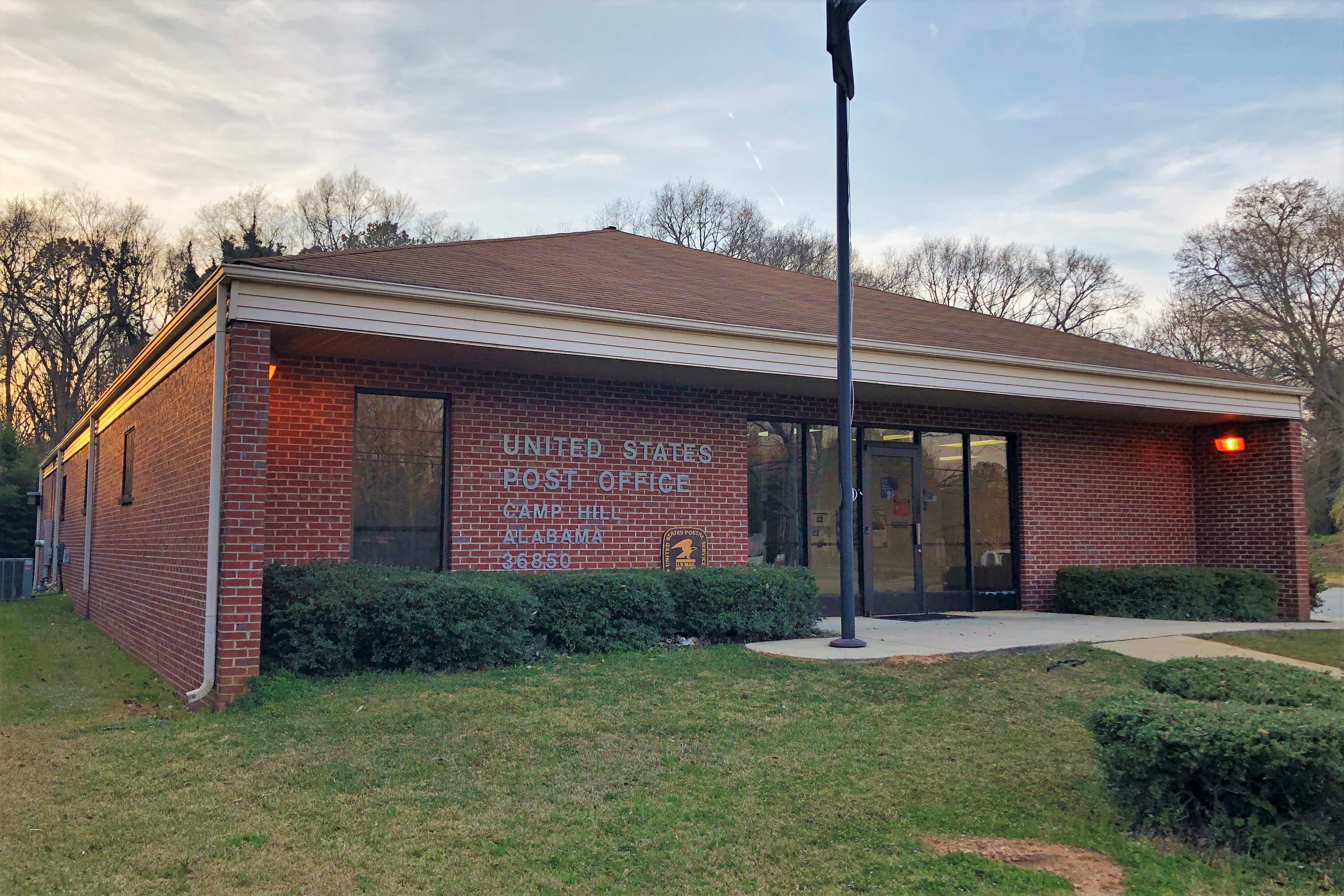
Camp Hill Post Office (ZIP code: 36850)

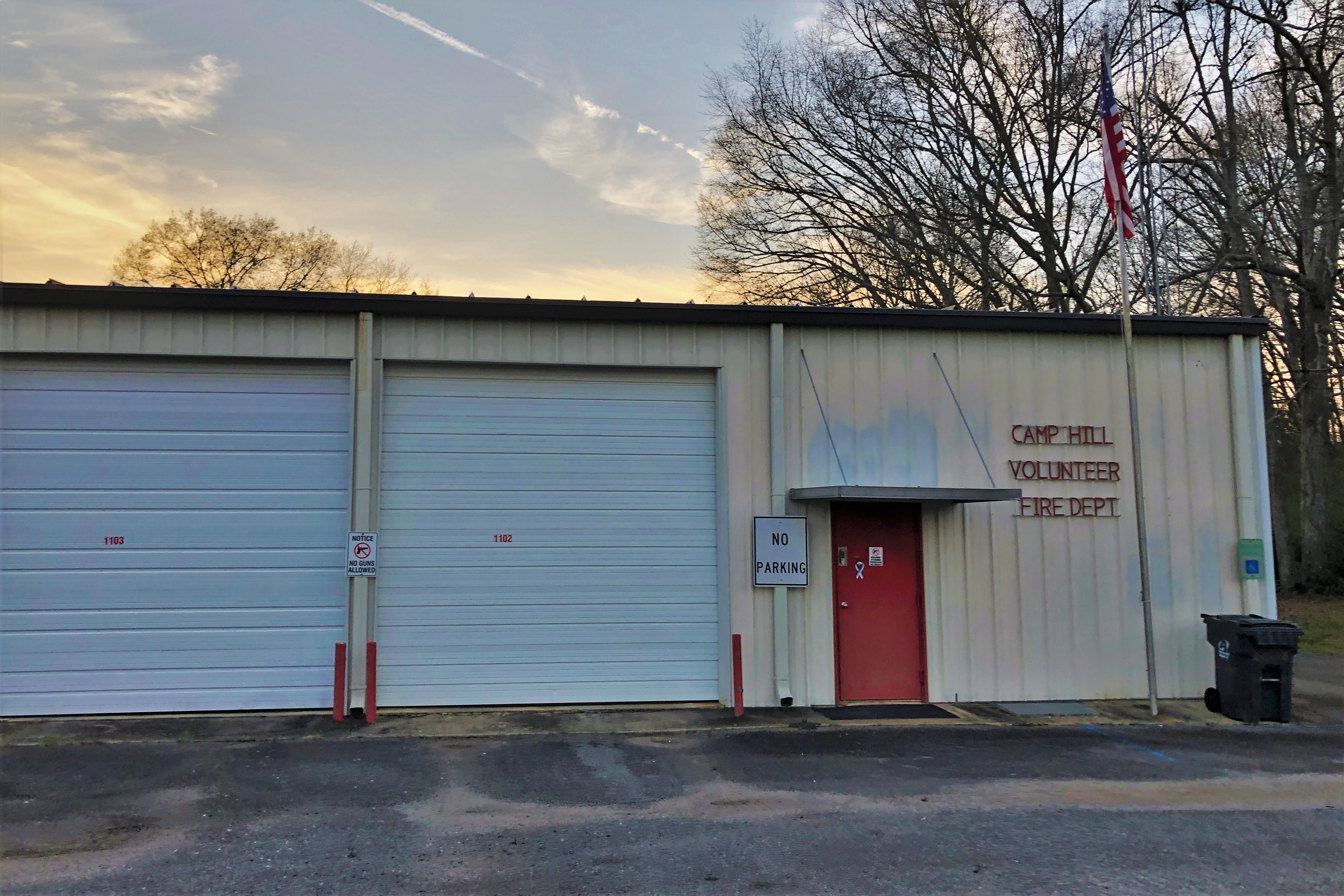
Camp Hill Volunteer Fire Department

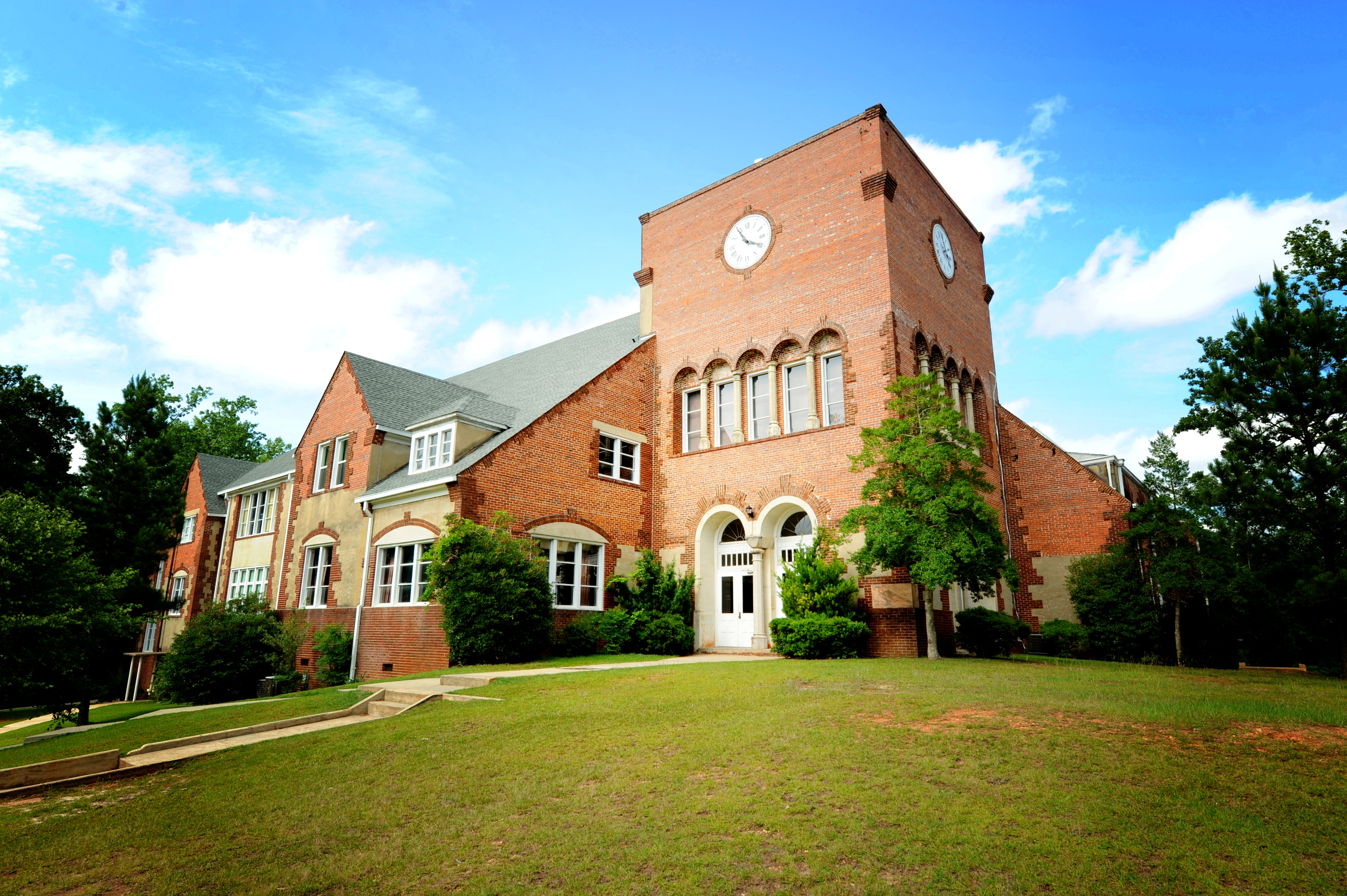
Tallapoosa Hall at Lyman Ward Military Academy

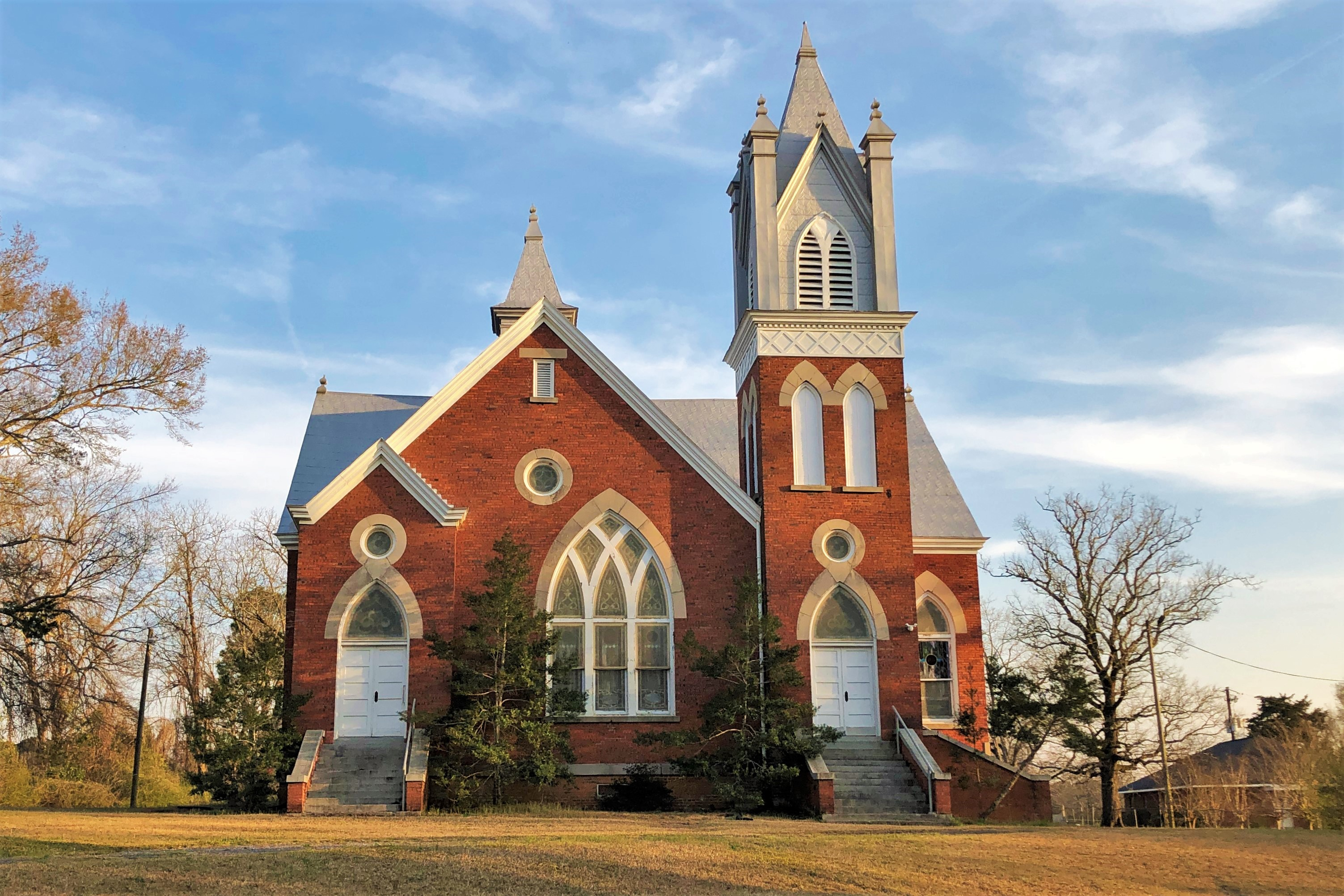
The First Universalist Church of Camp Hill

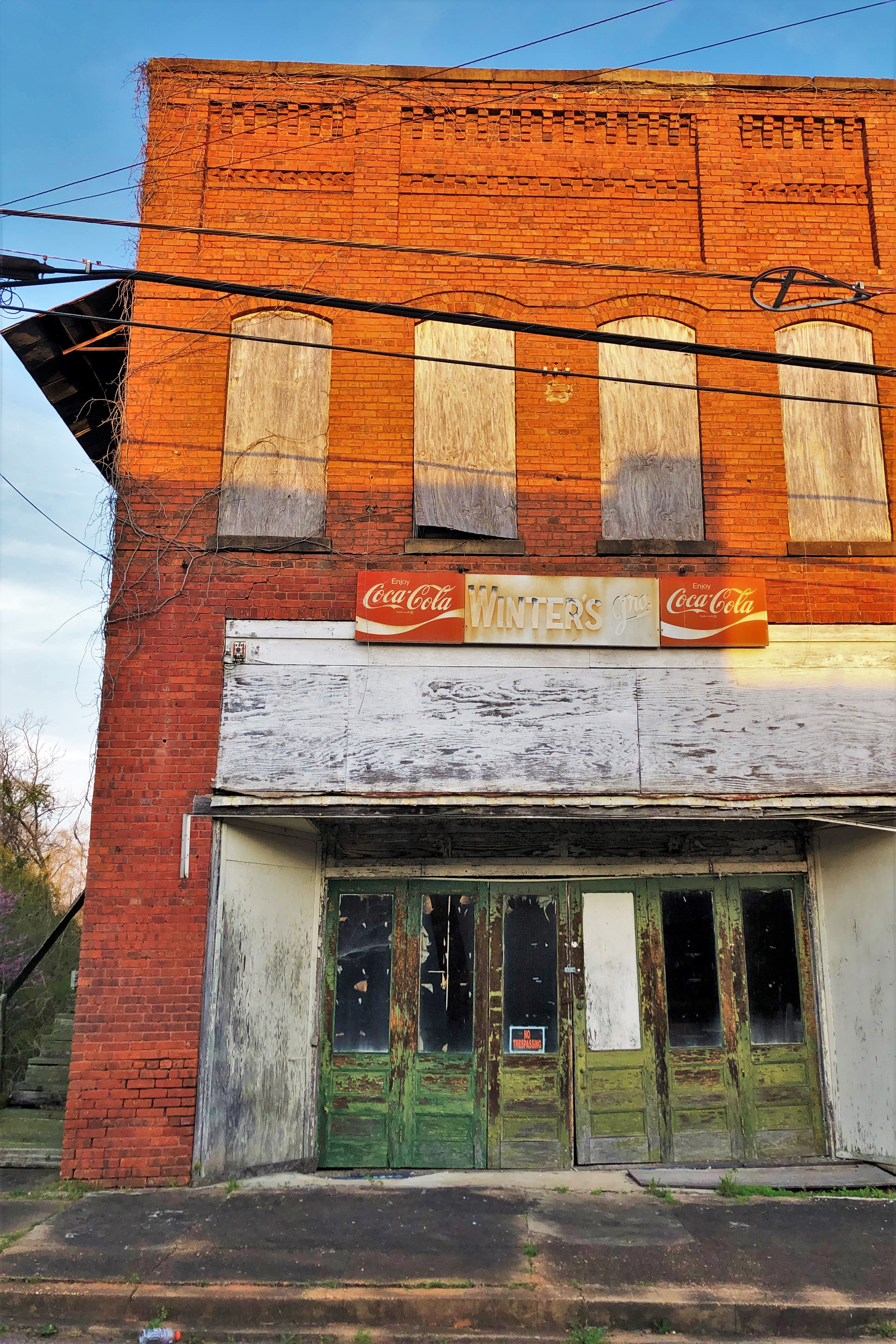
The Winter's Grocery Building in Camp Hill
