= Fosheeton, Alabama =

- Unincorporated community
- Location within Alabama Location within the United States
- Coordinates: 32°59′52″N 85°49′37″W
- Country: United States
- State: Alabama
- County: Tallapoosa
- Elevation: 741 ft (226 m)
- Time zone: UTC−6 (Central (CST))
  - Summer (DST): UTC−5 (CDT)
- Area code: 256
- GNIS feature ID: 118530

Fosheeton (also Fisheeton) is an unincorporated community in Tallapoosa County, Alabama, United States.
