= Bulgers, Alabama =

- Unincorporated community
- Location within Alabama Location within the United States
- Coordinates: 32°49′07″N 85°58′05″W
- Country: United States
- State: Alabama
- County: Tallapoosa
- Elevation: 577 ft (176 m)
- Time zone: UTC-6 (Central (CST))
  - Summer (DST): UTC-5 (CDT)
- Area code: 256
- GNIS feature ID: 158802

Bulgers (also Bulger, Bulgers Mill, Bulgers Mills, Oakchyer) is an unincorporated community in Tallapoosa County, Alabama, United States.
