= Hackneyville, Alabama =

- Census-designated place
- Location of Hackneyville in Tallapoosa County, Alabama.
- Coordinates: 33°03′24″N 85°55′52″W
- Country: United States
- State: Alabama
- County: Tallapoosa

Area
  - Total: 8.98 sq mi (23.25 km^{2})
  - Land: 8.96 sq mi (23.21 km^{2})
  - Water: 0.015 sq mi (0.04 km^{2})
- Elevation: 682 ft (208 m)

Population (2020)
  - Total: 349
  - Density: 38.9/sq mi (15.03/km^{2})
- Time zone: UTC-6 (Central (CST))
  - Summer (DST): UTC-5 (CDT)
- Area codes: 256 & 938
- GNIS feature ID: 2582678

Hackneyville is a census-designated place and unincorporated community in Tallapoosa County, Alabama, United States. As of the 2020 census, Hackneyville had a population of 349.

== Demographics ==
Historical population
Census	Pop.	Note	%±
2010	347		—
2020	349		0.6%
U.S. Decennial Census

Hackneyville was first listed as a census designated place in the 2010 U.S. census.

Hackneyville CDP, Alabama – Racial and ethnic composition Note: the US Census treats Hispanic/Latino as an ethnic category. This table excludes Latinos from the racial categories and assigns them to a separate category. Hispanics/Latinos may be of any race.
Race / Ethnicity (NH = Non-Hispanic)	Pop 2010	Pop 2020	% 2010	% 2020
White alone (NH)	338	337	97.41%	96.56%
Black or African American alone (NH)	3	0	0.86%	0.00%
Native American or Alaska Native alone (NH)	1	0	0.29%	0.00%
Asian alone (NH)	4	3	1.15%	0.86%
Native Hawaiian or Pacific Islander alone (NH)	0	0	0.00%	0.00%
Other race alone (NH)	0	0	0.00%	0.00%
Mixed race or Multiracial (NH)	0	5	0.00%	1.43%
Hispanic or Latino (any race)	1	4	0.29%	1.15%
Total	347	349	100.00%	100.00%

== History ==
Hackneyville was named after Hackney, a suburb of London, England.
