= Tallassee City School District =

School district in Alabama, United States

Address
- 308 King Street Tallassee, Alabama, 36078; United States

District information
- Type: Public
- Grades: PreK–12
- NCES District ID: 0103240

Students and staff
- Students: 1,680
- Teachers: 98.0
- Staff: 75.25
- Student–teacher ratio: 17.14

Other information
- Website: www.tcschools.com

Tallassee City School District or Tallassee City Schools (TCS) is a school district in Tallassee, Alabama.

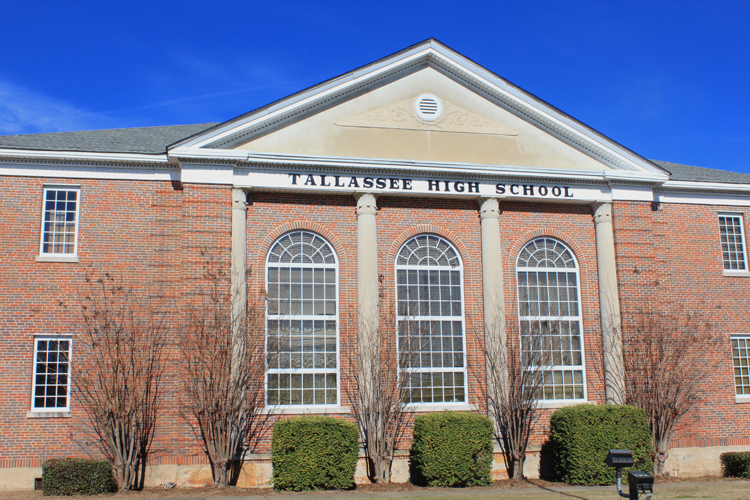
Tallassee High School

Tallassee City Schools serves approximately 2,000 students and employs 120 teachers and support staff in one central office, one high school, one middle school, and one elementary school.

The Superintendent of Tallassee City Schools is Dr. Brock Nolin.

The district is partially in Elmore County and partially in Tallapoosa County, including all of the Elmore County portion of Tallassee, and most of the Tallapoosa County part of Tallassee.

== History ==
Tallassee City Schools began in 1916, as the city limits of Tallassee partially lay in two counties: Elmore and Tallapoosa. Mount Vernon-Woodbury Mills, the largest employer in the community since 1844, chose to build a school system for the town. Initially, the plan was to educate students through eighth grade only, preparing them for work at the cotton mill. However, when the mill hired the first school superintendent, he created not only one of the first city-operated school systems in Alabama, but one of the most forward-looking.

The first Superintendent of Tallassee City Schools was Dr. Charles Bunyan Smith. Dr. Smith was a progressive educator who demanded that Tallassee meet accreditation requirements by educating students through twelfth grade. He guided the school system through a devastating fire that destroyed the original high school campus in 1928, and presided over the opening of a brand new facility exactly one year and two days later in 1929. Dr. Smith went on to become the president of Troy University. The auditorium, music, and English classes at Troy University meet in Smith Hall, which bears his name.

The current Superintendent is Dr. J. Brock Nolin, a graduate of Auburn University and Jacksonville State University.

Currently, Tallassee High School's main academic complex is being rebuilt. The new complex will be approximately 65,000 sq. ft. and house academic as well as a 650-seat auditorium and fine arts area.

J.E. "Hot" O'Brien served as the football coach of the Tallassee Tigers for over two decades. His 57-game winning streak from 1941-1947 set many records that have yet to be surpassed.

The current football coach is Mike Battles.

Tallassee also holds a record for tremendous successes in baseball under coaches Ronnie Baynes and John Goodman, winning seven AHSAA state championships from 1986-1998.

The current baseball coach is John Goodman.

In 2003 the district enacted a rule stating that students who participate in extracurricular activities are required to submit to random drug testing.

In 2006 Bobby Payne, the mayor of Tallassee, said that some officials from the city government discussed plans for the city to annex some rural areas west of the city limits as a method of keeping those areas within the city school system.

== Schools ==
The schools are Tallassee Elementary School, Southside Middle School, and Tallassee High School.

The principal of Tallassee Elementary School is Ms. Shanikka Beacher, and the assistant principal is Mr. Josh Taylor

The principal of Southside Middle School is Mrs. Brittany Spencer, and the assistant principal is Mr. Kevin O'Rear.

The principal of Tallassee High School is Mr. Drew Glass, and the assistant principal is Mrs. Brooke Barron.
