= Theodore Rosengarten =

American historian (born 1944)

- Born: December 17, 1944 (age 81)

Academic background
- Education: Amherst College; Harvard University

Academic work
- Discipline: History

Theodore Rosengarten (born December 17, 1944) is an American historian.

He graduated from Amherst College in 1966 with a BA, and earned his PhD from Harvard University with a dissertation on Ned Cobb (1885–1973), a former Alabama tenant farmer. Subsequently, he developed his interviews with Cobb as a kind of "autobiography", All God's Dangers: The Life of Nate Shaw (1974), which won the U.S. National Book Award in category Contemporary Affairs.

About fifteen years later, All God's Dangers: The Life of Nate Shaw was adapted and produced as a one-man play starring Cleavon Little at the Lamb's Theater in New York City.

== Awards ==
- 1989 MacArthur Fellows Program

== Works ==
- All God's Dangers: The Life of Nate Shaw, Knopf, 1974, ISBN 978-0-394-49084-7
- Tombee: Portrait of a Cotton Planter, Authors Theodore Rosengarten, Thomas Benjamin Chaplin, Editor Susan W. Walker, Morrow, 1986, ISBN 978-0-688-05412-0
- Land of Deepest Shade: Photographs of the South, authors Theodore Rosengarten, Photographs John McWilliams, High Museum of Art, 1989, ISBN 978-0-89381-392-5
- "A Portion of the People: Three Hundred Years of Southern Jewish Life", Editors Theodore Rosengarten, Dale Rosengarten, University of South Carolina Press, 2002, ISBN 978-1-57003-445-9
- Grass Roots: African Origins of an American Art, Authors Dale Rosengarten, Theodore Rosengarten, Enid Schildkrout, Judith Ann Carney, Museum for African Art, 2008, ISBN 978-0-945802-50-1
