= Tallapoosa County, Alabama =

County in Alabama, United States

- County
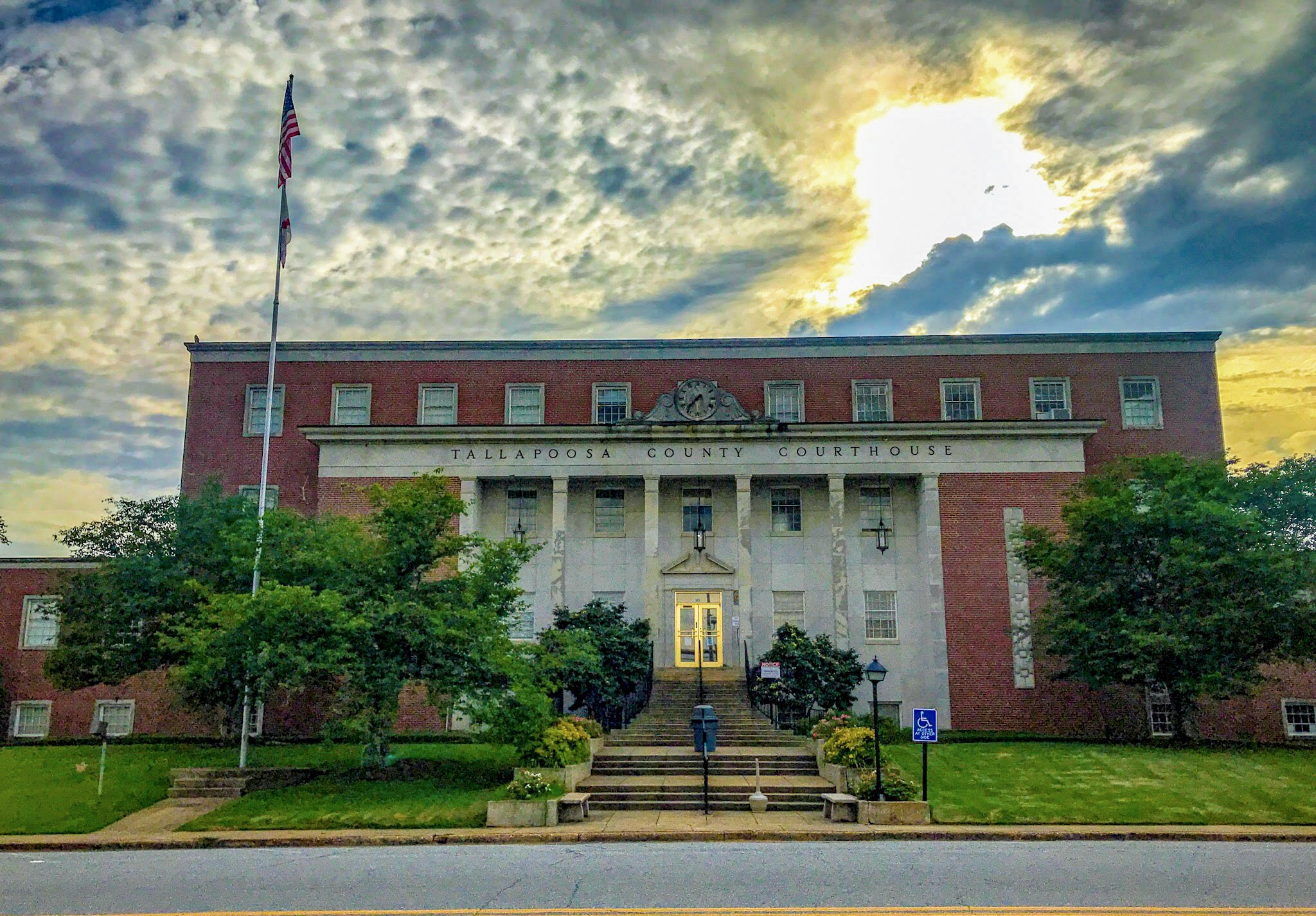
- Tallapoosa County Courthouse in Dadeville

- Seal

- Location within the U.S. state of Alabama
- Coordinates: 32°51′41″N 85°47′50″W
- Country: United States
- State: Alabama
- Founded: December 18, 1832
- Named for: Tallapoosa River
- Seat: Dadeville
- Largest city: Alexander City

Area
  - Total: 766 sq mi (1,980 km^{2})
  - Land: 717 sq mi (1,860 km^{2})
  - Water: 50 sq mi (130 km^{2}) 6.5%

Population (2020)
  - Total: 41,311
  - Estimate (2025): 40,953 ▼
  - Density: 57.6/sq mi (22.2/km^{2})
- Time zone: UTC−6 (Central)
  - Summer (DST): UTC−5 (CDT)
- Congressional district: 3rd
- Website: tallaco.com
- County Number 62 on Alabama Licence Plates

Tallapoosa County is a county located in the east-central portion of the U.S. state of Alabama. As of the 2020 census, the population was 41,311. Its county seat is Dadeville. Its largest city is Alexander City.

It is coterminus with the Alexander City micropolitan statistical area (MSA). The current MSA is the second incarnation, with the original area consisting of both Tallapoosa County and Coosa County. The original Alexander City Micropolitan Statistical Area was part of the Montgomery–Alexander City Combined Statistical Area. In 2013, the United States Office of Management and Budget removed the Alexander City micropolitan statistical area from its list of metropolitan and micropolitan areas. Coosa County was added to the Talladega-Sylacauga, AL micropolitan statistical area. However, effective July 2023, the Alexander City Micropolitan Statistical was officially reinstated but consists solely of Tallapoosa County. This reinstated statistical area is part of the Columbus–Auburn–Opelika combined statistical area.

== Etymology ==
The name Tallapoosa is of Creek origin; many Creek villages were located along the banks of the lower river before Indian Removal in the 19th century. Tallapoosa County, Alabama is named after the Tallapoosa River, which may mean "pulverized rock" in the Choctaw language. Tallapoosa is of Creek origin and may mean "grandmother town" in the Muscogee language. The Tallapoosa branch of the Muscogee tribe is considered one of the oldest groups in the Southeast. The river was a major population center for the Creek Indians before the early 19th century.

== History ==
In 1832, Tallapoosa County was created from lands ceded by the Creek Indians in the Treaty of Cusseta. The first county seat was the Creek town of Okfuskee. The forced removal of the Creeks in 1836 and 1837 was followed by a frantic gold rush, bringing a flood of profit seekers and settlers.

Established on December 18, 1832. Tallapoosa County's southwest strip of the county was detached from Tallapoosa County to become a portion of Elmore County when it was established on February 15, 1866.

The Battle of Horseshoe Bend was fought in the territory that would become Tallapoosa County in 1814. This battle effectively ended the Creek War.

== Geography ==
According to the United States Census Bureau, the county has a total area of 766 square miles (1,980 km^{2}), of which 717 square miles (1,860 km^{2}) is land and 50 square miles (130 km^{2}) (6.5%) is water. The county is located in the Piedmont region of the state.

The county is intersected by the Tallapoosa River.

=== Major highways ===
- U.S. Highway 280 / State Route 38 (unsigned)
- State Route 14
- State Route 22
- State Route 49
- State Route 50
- State Route 63
- State Route 120
- State Route 128
- State Route 259

=== Adjacent counties ===
- Clay County (north)
- Randolph County (northeast)
- Chambers County (east)
- Lee County (southeast)
- Macon County (south)
- Elmore County (southwest)
- Coosa County (west)

=== National protected area ===
- Horseshoe Bend National Military Park

== Demographics ==
Historical population
Census	Pop.	Note	%±
1840	6,444		—
1850	15,584		141.8%
1860	23,827		52.9%
1870	16,963		−28.8%
1880	23,401		38.0%
1890	25,460		8.8%
1900	29,675		16.6%
1910	31,034		4.6%
1920	29,744		−4.2%
1930	31,188		4.9%
1940	35,270		13.1%
1950	35,074		−0.6%
1960	35,007		−0.2%
1970	33,840		−3.3%
1980	38,766		14.6%
1990	38,826		0.2%
2000	41,475		6.8%
2010	41,616		0.3%
2020	41,311		−0.7%
2025 (est.)	40,953	▼	−0.9%
U.S. Decennial Census; 1790–1960 1900–1990; 1990–2000 2010–2020

=== Racial and ethnic composition ===
Tallapoosa County, Alabama – Racial and ethnic composition Note: the US Census treats Hispanic/Latino as an ethnic category. This table excludes Latinos from the racial categories and assigns them to a separate category. Hispanics/Latinos may be of any race.
Race / Ethnicity (NH = Non-Hispanic)	Pop 2000	Pop 2010	Pop 2020	% 2000	% 2010	% 2020
White alone (NH)	30,342	28,838	28,252	73.16%	69.30%	68.39%
Black or African American alone (NH)	10,488	11,050	10,366	25.29%	26.55%	25.09%
Native American or Alaska Native alone (NH)	107	119	84	0.26%	0.29%	0.20%
Asian alone (NH)	74	197	222	0.18%	0.47%	0.54%
Pacific Islander alone (NH)	3	2	0	0.01%	0.00%	0.00%
Other race alone (NH)	5	22	91	0.01%	0.05%	0.22%
Mixed race or Multiracial (NH)	214	346	1,152	0.52%	0.83%	2.79%
Hispanic or Latino (any race)	242	1,042	1,144	0.58%	2.50%	2.77%
Total	41,475	41,616	41,311	100.00%	100.00%	100.00%

=== 2020 census ===
As of the 2020 census, the county had a population of 41,311. The median age was 46.4 years. 20.1% of residents were under the age of 18 and 22.5% of residents were 65 years of age or older. For every 100 females there were 94.5 males, and for every 100 females age 18 and over there were 91.3 males age 18 and over.

The racial makeup of the county was 68.9% White, 25.2% Black or African American, 0.3% American Indian and Alaska Native, 0.5% Asian, 0.0% Native Hawaiian and Pacific Islander, 1.6% from some other race, and 3.4% from two or more races. Hispanic or Latino residents of any race comprised 2.8% of the population.

21.6% of residents lived in urban areas, while 78.4% lived in rural areas.

There were 17,376 households in the county, of which 26.9% had children under the age of 18 living with them and 31.1% had a female householder with no spouse or partner present. About 29.4% of all households were made up of individuals and 14.3% had someone living alone who was 65 years of age or older.

There were 22,686 housing units, of which 23.4% were vacant. Among occupied housing units, 71.3% were owner-occupied and 28.7% were renter-occupied. The homeowner vacancy rate was 1.7% and the rental vacancy rate was 9.0%.

=== 2010 census ===
As of the census of 2010, there were 41,616 people, 16,985 households, and 11,762 families living in the county. The population density was 58 inhabitants per square mile (22 inhabitants/km^{2}). There were 22,111 housing units at an average density of 31 units per square mile (12 units/km^{2}). The racial makeup of the county was 69.9% White, 26.6% Black or African American, 0.3% Native American, 0.5% Asian, 0% Pacific Islander, 1.7% from other races, and 1.0% from two or more races. Nearly 2.5% of the population were Hispanic or Latino of any race. There were 16,985 households, 25.6% had children under the age of 18 living with them, 48.4% were married couples living together, 15.9% had a female householder with no husband present, and 30.8% were non-families. Nearly 27.2% of households were made up of individuals, and 11.4% were one person aged 65 or older. The average household size was 2.42, and the average family size was 2.91.

The age distribution was 22.2% under the age of 18, 8.0% from 18 to 24, 23.3% from 25 to 44, 29.2% from 45 to 64, and 17.3% 65 or older. The median age was 42.4 years. For every 100 females, there were 94.2 males. For every 100 females age 18 and over, there were 95.8 males.

The median household income was $36,904 and the median family income was $47,918. Males had a median income of $34,625 versus $28,616 for females. The per capita income for the county was $22,542. About 13.4% of families and 17.5% of the population were below the poverty line, including 27.8% of those under age 18 and 9.1% of those age 65 or over.

=== 2000 census ===
As of the census of 2000. there were 41,475 people, 16,656 households, and 11,809 families living in the county. The population density was 58 inhabitants per square mile (22 inhabitants/km^{2}). There were 20,510 housing units at an average density of 29 units per square mile (11 units/km^{2}). The racial makeup of the county was 73.48% White, 25.36% Black or African American, 0.26% Native American, 0.18% Asian, 0.01% Pacific Islander, 0.17% from other races, and 0.54% from two or more races. Nearly 0.58% of the population were Hispanic or Latino of any race. There were 16,656 households, 29.90% had children under the age of 18 living with them, 53.00% were married couples living together, 14.30% had a female householder with no husband present, and 29.10% were non-families. Nearly 26.50% of households were made up of individuals, and 11.60% were one person aged 65 or older. The average household size was 2.44, and the average family size was 2.94.

The age distribution was 24.20% under the age of 18, 7.60% from 18 to 24, 26.70% from 25 to 44, 24.90% from 45 to 64, and 16.60% 65 or older. The median age was 39 years. For every 100 females, there were 90.50 males. For every 100 females age 18 and over, there were 86.10 males.

The median household income was $30,745 and the median family income was $38,148. Males had a median income of $28,557 versus $19,885 for females. The per capita income for the county was $16,909. About 13.50% of families and 16.60% of the population were below the poverty line, including 24.30% of those under age 18 and 15.60% of those age 65 or over.

== Politics ==
Tallapoosa County is a Republican county. The last Democrat to win the county was Jimmy Carter in 1980.

United States presidential election results for Tallapoosa County, Alabama
Year	Republican		Democratic		Third party(ies)	
Year	No.	%	No.	%	No.	%
1904	234	10.99%	1,791	84.08%	105	4.93%
1908	104	6.32%	1,343	81.59%	199	12.09%
1912	84	4.56%	1,586	86.06%	173	9.39%
1916	129	6.27%	1,892	91.98%	36	1.75%
1920	269	10.54%	2,257	88.44%	26	1.02%
1924	1	0.06%	1,713	99.59%	6	0.35%
1928	1,257	40.46%	1,849	59.51%	1	0.03%
1932	138	3.90%	3,391	95.87%	8	0.23%
1936	141	3.74%	3,625	96.10%	6	0.16%
1940	139	3.11%	4,325	96.65%	11	0.25%
1944	136	3.92%	3,326	95.88%	7	0.20%
1948	156	6.31%	0	0.00%	2,318	93.69%
1952	1,187	19.00%	5,055	80.89%	7	0.11%
1956	1,879	26.68%	5,070	72.00%	93	1.32%
1960	2,150	28.11%	5,460	71.39%	38	0.50%
1964	5,530	76.14%	0	0.00%	1,733	23.86%
1968	1,205	10.19%	1,331	11.26%	9,285	78.55%
1972	8,535	78.71%	2,113	19.49%	195	1.80%
1976	5,237	39.79%	7,614	57.84%	312	2.37%
1980	5,958	43.80%	7,260	53.37%	385	2.83%
1984	9,045	66.19%	4,458	32.62%	163	1.19%
1988	8,502	63.93%	4,598	34.58%	198	1.49%
1992	8,140	52.67%	5,703	36.90%	1,613	10.44%
1996	7,627	51.48%	6,071	40.98%	1,117	7.54%
2000	9,805	60.33%	6,183	38.04%	265	1.63%
2004	12,392	69.03%	5,451	30.36%	109	0.61%
2008	13,116	67.92%	6,063	31.40%	132	0.68%
2012	12,396	65.76%	6,319	33.52%	136	0.72%
2016	13,594	69.76%	5,519	28.32%	373	1.91%
2020	14,963	71.28%	5,859	27.91%	169	0.81%
2024	14,884	74.33%	4,975	24.85%	164	0.82%

United States Senate election results for Tallapoosa County, Alabama2
Year	Republican		Democratic		Third party(ies)	
Year	No.	%	No.	%	No.	%
2020	14,668	70.04%	6,255	29.87%	20	0.10%

United States Senate election results for Tallapoosa County, Alabama3
Year	Republican		Democratic		Third party(ies)	
Year	No.	%	No.	%	No.	%
2022	10,421	76.81%	2,914	21.48%	233	1.72%

Alabama Gubernatorial election results for Tallapoosa County
Year	Republican		Democratic		Third party(ies)	
Year	No.	%	No.	%	No.	%
2022	10,444	76.95%	2,751	20.27%	378	2.78%

== Communities ==
=== Cities ===
- Alexander City
- Dadeville (county seat)
- Tallassee (partly in Elmore County)

=== Towns ===
- Camp Hill
- Daviston
- Goldville
- Jackson's Gap
- New Site

=== Census-designated places ===
- Hackneyville
- Our Town
- Reeltown

=== Unincorporated communities ===
- Andrew Jackson
- Bulgers
- Cherokee Bluffs
- Church Hill
- Dudleyville
- Fosheeton
- Frog Eye

== Education ==
School districts in the county include:

- Alexander City Schools
- Tallapoosa County Schools
- Tallassee City School District

== See also ==
- National Register of Historic Places listings in Tallapoosa County, Alabama
- Properties on the Alabama Register of Landmarks and Heritage in Tallapoosa County, Alabama
