= Reeltown, Alabama =

- Census-designated place
- Location of Reeltown in Tallapoosa County, Alabama.
- Coordinates: 32°34′44″N 85°49′08″W
- Country: United States
- State: Alabama
- County: Tallapoosa

Area
  - Total: 7.58 sq mi (19.62 km^{2})
  - Land: 7.54 sq mi (19.54 km^{2})
  - Water: 0.027 sq mi (0.07 km^{2})
- Elevation: 512 ft (156 m)

Population (2020)
  - Total: 794
  - Density: 105.2/sq mi (40.62/km^{2})
- Time zone: UTC-6 (Central (CST))
  - Summer (DST): UTC-5 (CDT)
- Area code: 334
- GNIS feature ID: 2582697

Reeltown is a census-designated place and unincorporated community in Tallapoosa County, Alabama, United States. As of the 2020 census, Reeltown had a population of 794.

The "Reel" in Reeltown is a misspelling of "Real" from the last name of settlers James Patrick and Phillip O'Real. The town was called Thaddeus from 1880 to 1902 in honor of postmaster Thaddeus P. Webster. The name changed back to Reeltown in 1902.

This is also the home of Reeltown High School, notable for winning the state football championship in 1987 in the 2A division, 2001 in the 1A division, and also in 2009 and 2024 in the 2A division. In addition, Reeltown has two notable head football coaches with over 200 career wins.

- Duane Webster: (218-93-9)1956-1987
- Jackie O'Neal: (241-110-0) 1988-2015

Reeltown High School also had four former students serve as Alabama FFA Association State Officers.

- Mickey Humphries(Alabama FFA State Vice President 1963–1964)
- Lacey Newman(Alabama FFA State Secretary 2014–2015)
- Torran Smith(Alabama FFA State Sentinel 2016–2017)(First African American Alabama FFA Central District President 2015–2016)
- KaShiya McKinney (Alabama FFA State Reporter 2019-2020 and 2021 Alabama National Officer Candidate)

Reeltown used to be home to the Southeastern Kiwi Farming Cooperative, which was the Kiwi Farm in the state of Alabama.

== Demographics ==
Historical population
Census	Pop.	Note	%±
2010	766		—
2020	794		3.7%
U.S. Decennial Census

Reeltown was first listed as a census designated place in the 2010 U.S. census.

Reeltown CDP, Alabama – Racial and ethnic composition Note: the US Census treats Hispanic/Latino as an ethnic category. This table excludes Latinos from the racial categories and assigns them to a separate category. Hispanics/Latinos may be of any race.
Race / Ethnicity (NH = Non-Hispanic)	Pop 2010	Pop 2020	% 2010	% 2020
White alone (NH)	621	589	81.07%	74.18%
Black or African American alone (NH)	116	142	15.14%	17.88%
Native American or Alaska Native alone (NH)	1	0	0.13%	0.00%
Asian alone (NH)	1	3	0.13%	0.38%
Native Hawaiian or Pacific Islander alone (NH)	0	0	0.00%	0.00%
Other race alone (NH)	0	1	0.00%	0.13%
Mixed race or Multiracial (NH)	6	45	0.78%	5.67%
Hispanic or Latino (any race)	21	14	2.74%	1.76%
Total	766	794	100.00%	100.00%
