= Red Hill, Alabama =

Unincorporated community in Alabama, United States

- Unincorporated community
- Location within Alabama Location within the United States
- Coordinates: 34°15′21″N 86°25′27″W
- Country: United States
- State: Alabama
- County: Marshall
- Elevation: 633 ft (193 m)
- Time zone: UTC-6 (Central (CST))
  - Summer (DST): UTC-5 (CDT)
- Area codes: 256 & 938
- GNIS feature ID: 125481

Red Hill is an unincorporated community in Marshall County, Alabama, United States.

== History ==
A Cherokee village called Brown's Village was founded around 1790 on Brown's Creek, near present-day Red Hill.

During the American Civil War, one of Nathan B. Forrest's generals, Hylan B. Lyon, was staying in a private residence in Red Hill. He was captured by a detachment of the 15th Pennsylvania Cavalry, but managed to escape. On February 24, 1894, William Jackson Palmer was awarded the Medal of Honor for his actions as colonel leading the 15th Pennsylvania Cavalry at Red Hill, January 14, 1865, where "with less than 200 men, [he] attacked and defeated a superior force of the enemy, captured their fieldpiece and about 100 prisoners without losing a man."

A post office was operated under the name Red Hill from 1842 to 1905.
