= Tornado outbreak of April 19–20, 2020 =

April 2020 severe weather event in the United States

- Clockwise from top: Map of confirmed tornadoes, severe thunderstorm warnings, tornado warnings, and Day 1 SPC Outlooks for the entire event; EF3-rated tree damage near Sandy Hook, Mississippi; An unanchored duplex that was swept off its foundation following an EF2 tornado near Andalusia, Alabama; A Next-Generation Radar scan of an EF2 tornado that struck near Bridgeboro, Georgia; A mesoscale discussion regarding increased tornado likelihoods for parts of Mississippi and Louisiana

Meteorological history
- Duration: April 19–20, 2020

Tornado outbreak
- Tornadoes: 22 confirmed
- Max. rating: EF4 tornado
- Duration: 2 days
- Highest winds: Tornadic – 170 mph (270 km/h) (EF4 near Sandy Hook, Mississippi on April 19)
- Highest gusts: Non-tornadic – 78 knots (90 mph; 144 km/h) (near Gantt, Alabama on April 19)
- Largest hail: 2.00 inches (5.1 cm) (near Lawrence, Mississippi on April 19)

Overall effects
- Fatalities: 2 (+1 non-tornadic)
- Injuries: 1 (+2 non-tornadic)
- Damage: $2.688 million (2020 USD) ($3,340,000 in 2025 USD)
- Areas affected: Central and eastern Gulf Coast region of the southeastern United States
- Part of the Tornado outbreaks of 2020

From Sunday, April 19, to Monday, April 20, 2020, a significant severe weather and tornado outbreak took place across the Gulf states of the southeastern United States, resulting in widespread damage and two people getting killed, with an additional three people being injured. A total of 22 confirmed tornadoes occurred across the two days. In southern Mississippi, one supercell thunderstorm after dark put down a long-lived and deadly EF4 tornado that traversed across five counties, with one person killed near Sandy Hook, and another being injured near Camp Shelby. Across Alabama, several tornadoes, some significant, struck the southern portion of the state. One of these tornadoes, a lethal EF2 tornado, directly impacted the community of Tumbleton, killing one person who was inside a mobile home during the event. Multiple tornadoes on Sunday also occurred in Louisiana. The following day, April 20, featured less overall tornadoes and a couple EF0–EF1 tornadoes in Florida, with one EF2 tornado taking place in southwestern Georgia. Over in that state, a lightning strike set a house on fire, resulting in the death of the occupant. The tornado outbreak was accompanied by a strong squall line that brought damaging winds and hail to the region.

The long-track, (Note: Long-track is defined as traversing 30–60 miles (48–97 km) or more.) EF4 tornado that occurred on Sunday, April 19, was the third violent (EF4+) tornado to strike Mississippi within a week in the southern region, as a more destructive tornado outbreak swept across portions of the same areas seven days prior, on April 12. The April 19 tornado in southern Mississippi was also the fourth violent tornado to occur in the U.S. during the 2020 season.

== Meteorological synopsis ==
=== Forecasting in advance ===
SPC outlooks on April 19, 2020. (Note: The "z" timestamp indicators refer to Zulu military time zones, named after the NATO phonetic alphabet. Zulu time zones are equal to Universal Coordinated Time.)

Categorical outlooks issued at 1200z

Tornado outlooks issued at 1200z

Hail outlooks issued at 1200z

Wind outlooks issued at 1200z

On Saturday, April 18, 2020, at 2:00 AM EDT (06:00 UTC) the NOAA Storm Prediction Center (NOAA SPC) outlined a large level 3/5 enhanced risk for severe weather for the southeastern United States on April 19, stretching from a sliver of eastern Texas, to eastern Georgia, and southeastern South Carolina. At surface-level, a low-pressure area was to develop across the Ark-La-Tex region by the afternoon, as a warm front going to lift up north across from southern Arkansas, to northern Mississippi, Alabama and Georgia, at 2:00 PM EDT (18:00 UTC). At the same time, a cold front/dry line was to take place spanning throughout eastern Texas. Across the warm sector, (Note: Warm and cold sectors, refer to two regions of air masses that trail alongside cold and warm fronts.: A warm sector usually sits in between the cold and warm fronts, with these traditionally oriented west and north of the warm air mass. This is where the warmest air is to be found within a weather system.; A cold sector sits just west of the cold front, with the region seeing much cooler temperatures due to colder winds coming from the north. This is parallel to the warm sector, which receives warmer air from the south.) lots of moisture was abundant alongside dew points reaching into the 60–70 °F (16–21 °C) range. These in response would generate moderate levels of instability. The low-pressure system, presumed to be linked to widespread convection, translated in an eastward trajectory as it was accompanying a synoptic front overnight, reaching North Carolina by the morning of Monday, April 20, around 8:00 AM EDT (12:00 UTC). For Sunday, a 10% hatched tornado risk, (Note: Hatched risks refer to a 10% chance of significant severe weather events taking place within 25 miles (40 km) of any set point in the forecasted area of risk.: For tornadoes, it could mean for those of EF2 strength or stronger.; For thunderstorms wind gusts, it could be interpreted for hurricane-force winds of 74 miles per hour (119 km/h) or higher.; For hail, a diameter of 2 inches (5.1 cm) or greater is guaranteed to likely occur.) spanned across the same area encompassed by the categorical enhanced risk. A progressive shortwave trough was expected to move from the southern Great Plains, toward the Lower Mississippi River Valley by the following Sunday, and the South Atlantic states by Monday. Strong westerly winds aloft blew into the region, and continued to intensify as the trough was approaching. Southwesterly 850-millibar winds also began strengthening in response to the incoming shortwave, and were reaching an altitude in excess of 50,000 feet (15,000 m) by 12:00 PM EDT (00:00 UTC) within an area extending from Mississippi, to the Atlantic coast.

A progression loop of the 500-millibar synoptic environment throughout the outbreak's total span over the U.S.

By around 1:30 PM EDT (17:30 UTC) on April 18, the NOAA SPC upgraded the storm forecast for April 19 to a level 4/5 moderate risk, in a region from northeastern Louisiana to south-central Alabama, for the relatively high likelihood of strong tornadoes and numerous severe thunderstorms. The tornado risk was upgraded to a 15% hatched zone that was spread over parts of Louisiana, Mississippi and Alabama, with 30% hatched area for damaging winds and large hail also taking place as far west as from eastern Texas, as north from southern Arkansas, and as east as western Georgia. Elevated thunderstorms, (Note: Elevated and surface-based storms differentiate with each other with the height of their base: the bottom side of a thunderstorm.: Elevated thunderstorms are high-based storms and develop over a stable surface layer, compared to their surface-based counterparts. These storms are less likely to produce tornadoes due to limited surface inflow, but are capable to generate large and damaging hail, and sometimes strong winds.; Surface-based thunderstorms form by rising air parcels within a warm and moist surface layer of the atmosphere. These storms feed off instability, and commonly form within a warm sector as opposed to their elevated parallels, which occur usually in a cold sector. A surface-based thunderstorm is more likely to turn into a rotating supercell, because its base is connected right away with the ground-layer of the atmosphere, allowing them to tap into low-level wind shear.) posed largely a hail threat throughout the low-level warm advection regime across the Mississippi/Alabama region, and were expected to continue the following day. The advection was to extend eastwards across Alabama, and eventually into southern and central Georgia on Monday, April 20 as a weak, low-amplitude shortwave trough. The possibility of storms becoming surface-based, was greater on the south flank of the wave across Georgia and the surrounding region. This resulted in severe hazards in all kinds becoming probable.

=== April 19 ===
A tornado watch that was issued for portions of northeastern Louisiana and central Mississippi

Past 2:00 AM EDT (06:00 UTC) on Sunday, April 19, The NOAA SPC expanded the moderate risk to span from extreme eastern Texas, to southeastern Georgia. Over an hour later, at approximately 3:20 AM EDT (07:30 UTC) a Public Severe Weather Outlook (PWO) was issued by the SPC, in regard to the expanding threat of widespread of severe thunderstorms and tornadoes being likely within parts of the southeastern U.S. A potent upper-level trough was to blow eastwards across parts of Texas and Oklahoma, as a mid-level jet-streak moved into the American Southeast, blowing in at 60–75 knots (69–86 mph; 111–139 km/h). Alongside with other key ingredients coming into play, this set the stage for a regional tornado outbreak across the Lower Mississippi River Valley, and to the east in areas in Mississippi state, Alabama, and Georgia. The greatest threat for tornadoes was expected to be from the late morning to the afternoon, and during the evening and night hours. Later on Sunday evening, a mesoscale discussion was issued by the SPC for southern Mississippi and adjacent areas of extreme eastern Louisiana, between 7:30 PM–7:40 PM EDT (23:30–23:40 UTC). This was in response for a noticed corridor of higher tornado probabilities being set up, as a gust front moved south from central Mississippi, down to the state's southern region. Storms trailing along or within the boundary, were expected to encounter more potent levels of low-level wind shear. One of these storms an hour later, would end up producing a long-lived and violent tornado southeast of Tylertown, Mississippi. (Note: See more here.)

=== April 20 ===
At approximately 9:00 AM EDT (13:00 UTC) on Monday, April 20, the SPC outlined a slight risk for severe weather over central Florida, partially driven by a 2% probability of a tornado within 25 miles (40 km) of a point for central to north-central Florida. Additionally, a 15% probability of thunderstorm winds 50 knots (58 mph; 93 km/h) or greater in strength within 25 miles (40 km) of a point was outlined for the same area. A large trough extended from the Great Lakes region to as far southeastward as Florida, and a well-defined and strong atmospheric disturbance over Georgia, the Florida panhandle, and southern portions of the Appalachians was expected to weaken and move northeastward into the Carolinas. A line of thunderstorms was ongoing, and favorable low-level wind shear alongside increasing instability from daytime heating and favorable amounts of atmospheric moisture were present within the region. Into the afternoon hours, favorable wind shear and Mixed Layer Convective Available Potential Energy (MLCAPE) values of around 2000–2500 J/kg were expected, likely allowing severe weather to persist until the evening. As the day progressed, a broken squall line tracked southward across central portions of Florida, with intermittent supercellular and bowing structures being present, creating a risk of brief tornadoes and damaging winds. This threat declined throughout the day as atmospheric structures supporting the development of convection shifted offshore, with wind shear, CAPE values, and dew points all lowering and becoming less favorable for severe weather. By 4:00 PM EDT (20:00 UTC), the SPC completely removed the 2% tornado probability from the newest outlook.

== Confirmed tornadoes ==
Confirmed tornadoes by Enhanced Fujita rating
EFU	EF0	EF1	EF2	EF3	EF4	EF5	Total
0	5	13	3	0	1	0	22

=== April 19 event ===
List of confirmed tornadoes – Sunday, April 19, 2020 (Note: All dates are based on the local time zone where the tornado touched down; however, all times are in Coordinated Universal Time for consistency.)
EF#	Location	County / Parish	State	Start Coord.	Time (UTC)	Path length	Max width
EF1	NNE of Dry Prong to SW of Georgetown	Grant	LA	31.6611°N 92.4865°W	19:17–19:21	2.21 mi (3.56 km)	500 yd (460 m)
EF1	Numerous trees were snapped or uprooted.						
EF1	N of Leesville	Vernon	LA	31.1666°N 93.3313°W	21:50–21:57	5.34 mi (8.59 km)	500 yd (460 m)
EF1	A tornado snapped, uprooted, or downed numerous trees and power lines. Some of the trees fell on homes and vehicles.						
EF4	ESE of Tylertown to N of Sandy Hook to NW of New Augusta	Walthall, Marion, Lamar, Forrest, Perry	MS	31.0707°N 89.9646°W	00:09–01:19	53.76 mi (86.52 km)	2,275 yd (2,080 m)
EF4	1 death – See section on this tornado – One person was injured.						
EF1	E of McNeil	Pearl River	MS	30.6783°N 89.5729°W	02:51–02:58	3.12 mi (5.02 km)	200 yd (180 m)
EF1	Numerous trees were snapped or uprooted. A chicken coop was damaged and a house had a portion of its roof torn off.						
EF1	Mandeville	St. Tammany	LA	30.3684°N 90.0845°W	03:13–03:17	3.05 mi (4.91 km)	300 yd (270 m)
EF1	Numerous trees were snapped or uprooted in town, some of which fell on homes and vehicles. A small building at Mandeville Elementary School had its tin roof peeled off.						
EF2	NE of Andalusia to NW of Babbie	Covington	AL	31.3479°N 86.3955°W	03:49–03:52	4.88 mi (7.85 km)	740 yd (680 m)
EF2	A poorly anchored duplex was pushed off its foundation and largely destroyed, with debris strewn 75 yd (69 m) away. A nearby concrete block workshop and storage unit were also destroyed. A house had large portions of its roof ripped off and partial exterior wall failure, and also had its doors and windows blown in. A metal garage building was heavily damaged, and had a large storage trailer thrown into it. Four large chicken houses were completely destroyed, and some semi-trailers were overturned. Numerous large trees were snapped along the path, some of which landed on a house. One person was injured. In November 2023, this tornado was reanalyzed and had its starting point adjusted further northwest based on widespread tree deforestation noted on Planet satellite imagery. The ending point was also extended further east due to tree damage.						
EF1	W of Mobile Regional Airport	Mobile	AL	30.7092°N 88.3781°W	03:55–04:06	8.9 mi (14.3 km)	100 yd (91 m)
EF1	Many homes sustained damage to their roofs, siding, gutters, chimneys, and porches. Numerous fences were blown down, and numerous trees were snapped or uprooted.						
EF0	NE of Elba	Coffee	AL	31.543°N 85.974°W	04:03–04:07	4.4 mi (7.1 km)	50 yd (46 m)
EF0	Numerous trees were snapped, and roofs were damaged.						
EF1	W of Dees	Mobile	AL	30.5771°N 88.3973°W	04:05–04:07	1.3 mi (2.1 km)	75 yd (69 m)
EF1	Four barns were destroyed, three empty semi trailers and an irrigation watering system were overturned, and numerous trees were snapped. A large metal building had one door blown in while a second door was blown out.						
EF1	SE of Mobile Regional Airport to N of Tillmans Corner	Mobile	AL	30.6684°N 88.2154°W	04:06–04:12	3.17 mi (5.10 km)	75 yd (69 m)
EF1	Several trees were snapped or uprooted, with some homes damaged by fallen trees and limbs, and fences were blown down as this tornado moved through Western Mobile.						
EF1	Ozark to NW of Haleburg	Dale, Henry	AL	31.46°N 85.63°W	04:20–04:45	24.37 mi (39.22 km)	150 yd (140 m)
EF1	This tornado mainly snapped and uprooted trees along its path. In Ozark, it ripped the brick facade from the side of a doctor's office, and it also tore siding from a business. The tornado crossed from Dale County into Henry County, severely damaging several small barns, farm buildings, and silos. Minor roof damage was inflicted to several homes. The tornado dissipated as two other nearby tornadoes became the dominant circulations within the storm.						
EF0	NE of Oak Grove	Geneva	AL	31.1°N 85.78°W	04:32–04:35	1.82 mi (2.93 km)	100 yd (91 m)
EF0	Some trees were damaged.						
EF2	Tumbleton	Henry	AL	31.3994°N 85.2790°W	04:40–04:47	5.18 mi (8.34 km)	300 yd (270 m)
EF2	1 death – See section on this tornado.						
EF1	Southwestern Dothan	Houston	AL	31.21°N 85.46°W	04:42–04:44	0.71 mi (1.14 km)	50 yd (46 m)
EF1	A brief tornado struck the southwestern outskirts of Dothan, causing roof damage to nine homes and a storage facility. Trees were downed as well.						
EF1	E of Balkum	Henry	AL	31.4007°N 85.2142°W	04:45–04:48	1.49 mi (2.40 km)	500 yd (460 m)
EF1	An automotive shop was destroyed, and a home had an exterior wall ripped off by this high-end EF1 tornado. Another home and a mobile home sustained roof damage, and several trees were downed. The tornado occurred simultaneously with the three other Henry County tornadoes.						
EF1	NE of Robertsdale	Baldwin	AL	30.5903°N 87.5818°W	04:46–04:47	0.47 mi (0.76 km)	300 yd (270 m)
EF1	Numerous large trees were snapped. A couple of mobile homes sustained roof, siding, and skirting damage, and an RV camper was lifted and demolished. One person was injured.						
EF1	NW of Haleburg	Henry	AL	31.4455°N 85.2619°W	04:46–04:50	6.45 mi (10.38 km)	100 yd (91 m)
EF1	The roof of a double-wide manufactured home was damaged; otherwise, damage was limited to snapped or uprooted trees. This tornado occurred simultaneously with the Tumbleton EF2 and Balkum EF1 tornadoes.						

=== April 20 event ===
List of confirmed tornadoes – Monday, April 20, 2020
EF#	Location	County / Parish	State	Start Coord.	Time (UTC)	Path length	Max width
EF0	WNW of Pace	Santa Rosa	FL	30.6079°N 87.187°W	05:07–05:08	0.19 mi (0.31 km)	50 yd (46 m)
EF0	A brief tornado embedded within straight line winds downed several trees.						
EF2	NW of Bridgeboro to SE of Gordy	Mitchell, Worth	GA	31.42°N 84.00°W	06:10–06:14	8.72 mi (14.03 km)	500 yd (460 m)
EF2	Two homes suffered extensive roof and siding damage, and a third sustained roof loss and some collapse of exterior walls. A mobile home also sustained roof damage, and an outbuilding was destroyed.						
EF0	W of Homosassa to Homosassa Springs	Citrus	FL	28.79°N 82.69°W	13:39–13:48	7.25 mi (11.67 km)	35 yd (32 m)
EF0	A waterspout moved onshore, inflicting major damage to two mobile homes and minor damage to seven others. Several trees were downed in the Homosassa Springs Wildlife Park, power poles were snapped, and a billboard was toppled. The canopy of a gas station was blown off, while one business sustained considerable damage.						
EF1	SE of Ocala	Marion	FL	29.00°N 82.17°W	13:40–13:55	12.5 mi (20.1 km)	500 yd (460 m)
EF1	A tornado tossed a stationary construction trailer across Interstate 75 and caused severe damage to two homes just northeast of the interstate. It then snapped numerous trees, and caused mainly minor roof and window damage along an intermittent path.						
EF0	Lake Jesup	Seminole	FL	28.7186°N 81.2418°W	15:45–15:48	2.74 mi (4.41 km)	25 yd (23 m)
EF0	A tornadic waterspout moved across Lake Jesup to the east of Winter Springs. No damage occurred.						

=== Sandy Hook–Purvis–Camp Shelby, Mississippi ===
Sandy Hook–Purvis–Camp Shelby, Mississippi
- The rain-wrapped wedge tornado as captured by a drone near the community of Hurricane Creek, Mississippi

Meteorological history
- Formed: April 19, 2020, 7:09 PM CDT (UTC–05:00)
- Dissipated: April 19, 2020, 8:19 PM CDT (UTC–05:00)
- Duration: 1 hour, 10 minutes

EF4 tornado
- on the Enhanced Fujita scale
- Highest winds: 170 mph (270 km/h)

Overall effects
- Fatalities: 1
- Injuries: 1
- Damage: $700,000 (2020 USD)

This very large, violent and long-lived tornado touched down after dusk on April 19, in the southeastern corner of Walthall County, Mississippi. The tornado developed at 7:09 PM CDT (00:09 UTC) to the far southeast of Tylertown, or a few miles north of the state border with Louisiana along MS 48. Paralleling MS 48, the tornado caused weak EF0–EF1 damage as it headed in its eastward trajectory, mainly snapping off branches and uprooting trees. Afterwards, a PDS tornado warning was issued for the region by the National Weather Service, at 7:10 PM CDT (00:10 UTC). The reason cited that a large, and extremely dangerous tornado was developing. The tornado exited Walthall County three minutes later, beginning to suddenly head northeast as it entered Marion County at 7:13 PM CDT (00:13 UTC).

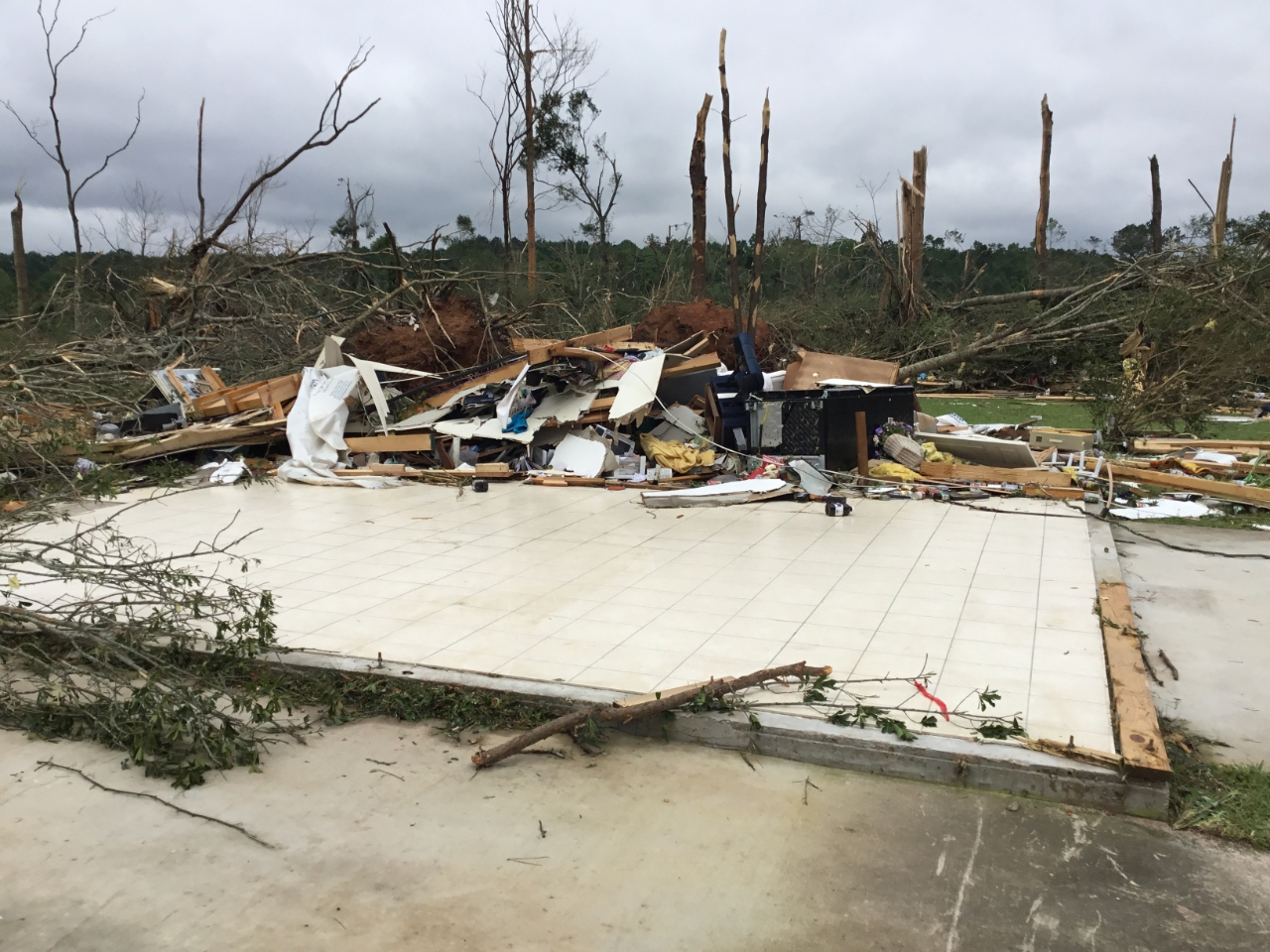
Low-end EF4 damage to a home northwest of Sandy Hook

In southern Marion County, the tornado continued with causing minor damage to the wooded areas, following New Hope Road as the track persisted to the northeast. Passing over the three-way junction connecting both New Hope and A. Pittman Roads, the tornado abruptly began to intensify, causing EF2 damage to some trees before strengthening further, inflicting EF3 damage to additional wooded areas. The intense tornado at this point still headed northeastwards, before the storm's track began to jog more to the east. Encroaching on Johnson Road, the tornado impacted a home and suddenly became violent as it inflicted EF4 damage. Winds were estimated at 170 miles per hour (270 km/h) as the tornado completely swept the home off its foundation, and debarked patches of trees nearby. The house was bolted down to the foundation with anchoring bolts, some were found bent during the damage survey. A higher rating was negated for the residence, as National Weather Service assessment teams from the Jackson, Mississippi office, discovered that debris was not blown far enough away from the foundation or were left sitting on large portions of the slab. Further along Johnson Road, the storm snapped numerous power poles at EF2 strength, and multiple other properties, including mobile homes, were considerably damaged or obliterated including one modular house being blown away at EF3 intensity. A man was killed inside of one of these residencies, as the tornado passed through. The tornado then began to veer more in an east-northeastward trajectory, weakening from EF4 to EF3 intensity as it plowed through forests. On Hurricane Creek Church Road, the tornado impacted a church site and cemetery, damaging the roof of one home and sweeping away an outbuilding off its bolted slab at EF2 intensity. Trees also were snapped or debarked at EF3 intensity, and headstones at the graveyard across the road were knocked over. The tornado afterwards began to weaken even further to EF2 strength, as it mainly damaged trees and powerlines while passing through woods and occasional fields, to the north of Sandy Hook. Some houses east of MS 43 as well were affected. Afterwards, the tornado gradually lowered in intensity, down to EF1 strength as it approached the eastern border of Marion County.

Next-Generation Radar imagery of the tornado

Particularly dangerous situation (PDS) tornado warning for Marion and Lamar Counties

Crossing over into Lamar County, the tornado kept moving east-northeastward north of Baxterville, fluctuating in between EF0 and EF1 status. Further up ahead, the rainwrapped storm passed through the far northern extent of Purvis, inflicting moderate damage to some industrial buildings. South of Hattiesburg in Forrest County, the tornado hit the northern perimeters of the Camp Shelby Mississippi Guard post, again causing light damage to parts of the base as it swung in between EF0–EF1 strength. One person in the vicinity, who was inside a truck along Glenn Walker Lake, was injured as a tree fell onto the vehicle. Thereafter and crossing over US 98, and paralleling it, the tornado moved into Perry County to the west-northwest of New Augusta. The tornado's time within the county was limited, only being on the ground for the final six minutes before dissipating at 8:19 PM CDT (01:19 UTC).

=== Tumbleton, Alabama ===
Tumbleton, Alabama
- Next-Generation Radar imagery of the tornado

Meteorological history
- Formed: April 19, 2020, 11:40 PM CDT (UTC–05:00)
- Dissipated: April 19, 2020, 11:47 PM CDT (UTC–05:00)
- Duration: 7 minutes

EF2 tornado
- on the Enhanced Fujita scale
- Highest winds: 125 mph (201 km/h)

Overall effects
- Fatalities: 1
- Injuries: 0

Just before midnight, at approximately 11:36 PM CDT (04:36 UTC) the National Weather Service office in Tallahassee, Florida, issued a tornado warning for both Dale and Henry Counties in Alabama. This was one of multiple warnings issued by the office in response to a persistent tornado threat. At 11:40 PM CDT (04:40 UTC) or four minutes later, a tornado touched down south of a neighborhood along County Road 12, or to the west-southwest of Tumbleton at EF1 intensity. Right after forming, the tornado snapped multiple trees in a wooded grove, along County Road 165, before heading in an east-northeastward direction.

A mobile home in Tumbleton that was blown away at EF2 intensity, where one person was killed

The tornado thereafter moved through fields, and occasional shelter belts, uprooting several oak trees in the process. The tornado then moved into the core part of Tumbleton, inflicting extensive damage to trees and buildings in the community. Along County Road 99, a home and a retail shop and a had parts of their roofs torn away at EF1 strength. Nearby, a shed on the intersection with County Roads 12 and 99 was completely obliterated by the tornado. Just to the north, a house suffered considerable EF2 roof damage, with large trees next to the house having been rooted up from the ground. Debris from the tornado was noted to have spread a little distance near to a tree grove to the northeast. The tornado then weakened down to EF1 intensity, snapping numerous trees in aforementioned wooded area. Paralleling County Road 26, the tornado restrengthened to EF2 intensity, as the exterior walls of one residence were collapsed on the southeastern flank of the road. Continued EF1 tree damage as well ensued, before the tornado started approaching another intersection connecting County Road 26 with 103. Passing over a tree line the tornado hit a mobile home, where a man was killed inside when the storm moved through.

Exiting out of Tumbleton fully to the northeast, the tornado began to move across open fields, causing EF1 damage to a few tree lines, and flipping one irrigation pivot upside down. Passing through a farm, the tornado intensified back to EF2 strength for a third time in its life, causing substantial amounts of roof damage to one nearby house, before persisting onward on its trajectory. Exiting out of Tumbleton fully to the northeast, the tornado began to move across open fields, causing EF1 damage to a few tree lines, and flipping one irrigation pivot upside down. Passing through a farm, the tornado intensified back to EF2 strength for a third time in its life, causing substantial amounts of roof damage to one nearby house, before persisting onward on its trajectory. The tornado then passed through areas northwest of Brown Crossroad, causing weak EF0–EF1 damage to some trees and structures, before dissipating at 11:47 PM CDT (04:47 UTC).

== Non-tornadic effects ==
Straight line winds in Alabama resulted in 3 injuries. Lightning caused a fatality in Georgia.

== Aftermath ==
=== Damage assessments ===
The following Monday, April 20, National Weather Service (NWS) teams from the Gulf states, began preparing or were completing their damage surveys of the tornadoes from the night prior. The NWS assessment team from the New Orleans, Louisiana office, confirmed an EF1 tornado in Mandeville, in St. Tammany Parish. The NWS office in Jackson, Mississippi later published a preliminary report in the early Monday evening, confirming that a violent EF4 tornado took place from Walthall to Perry Counties in Mississippi, on Sunday. The tornado tracked for approximately 54.2 miles (87.2 km) along with a width of 1.25 miles (2.01 km) wide at its largest. One fatality, and one injury, were reported from this tornado. In Alabama, NWS teams from Birmingham and Mobile, but also from Tallahassee, Florida, as well conducted their own surveys and published their preliminary findings. The offices from Monday to Wednesday, April 22, discovered the presence of EF0–EF2 tornadoes in Alabama, including a lethal EF2 tornado in Henry County, Alabama. Alongside the tornadoes, strong straight-line winds produced by an accompanying quasi-linear convective system inflicted extensive damage.

Months after the initial damage assessments, the EF4 tornado was finalized by the NOAA National Centers for Environmental Information. The path was updated to 53.76 miles (86.52 km) long, a slight decrease as opposed to its preliminarily surveyed track. The damage swath however, was enlarged to 2,275 yards (2,080 m) wide or around 1.3 miles at its largest in Marion County, Mississippi, compared to its previously 1.25 mi (2.01 km) width.

=== Regional impact ===
Storm damage near Lake Martin, Alabama

The severe weather and tornado outbreak from the 19th, to the 20th, was the second-consecutive event to take place during the month of April 2020. Tornadoes mainly impacted more rural areas and came in at a lower total count, as opposed to the much more historic Easter outbreak from April 12–13. The long-track and deadly tornado that traveled across portions of southern Mississippi, was the only violent tornado to occur during the outbreak. It was also the third EF4 tornado to occur in the state in 2020, especially in a 40 mi (64 km) radius within a 7-day period since the Easter tornado outbreak. That other outbreak produced two large EF4 tornadoes on April 12, one of them also occurring in Walthall and Marion Counties the week prior, and the other being an enormous tornado that grew to 2.25 miles (3.62 km) wide and impacted the towns of Bassfield, Soso, and several other communities in southeastern Mississippi on that day. The April 19 tornado caused approximately $700,000 (2020 USD) in damages along its path. A 71-year old man was killed, and another person was injured by this EF4 tornado. Elsewhere in the state, US 49 in Hattiesburg was shut off from access, due to torrential rainfall which affected the city. Heavy winds also battered the western side, amplifying the downpour caused by storms on Sunday, April 19. According to Lamar County Emergency Management, several trees were downed, and some homes were damaged as the EF4 tornado reportedly moved 40 miles per hour (64 km/h) from Baxterville to Purvis, via the Hattiesburg American. This all eventually resulted in the deadliest tornado season since 2012. The deadly EF2 tornado that affected Tumbleton, Alabama, was one of a several tornadoes that occurred in both Dale and Henry Counties, with other EF1 tornadoes having taken place simultaneously with the EF2 tornado in the same area. One 61-year old man was killed inside his modular residence, making this tornado the second of two deadly tornadoes to take place during the April 19–20 outbreak, alongside the long-track EF4 tornado that occurred hours prior in southern Mississippi. In Wilcox County, Georgia, the county sheriff reported to the Associated Press that one person died inside their home due to a fire, inflicted by a lightning strike. In all, the April 19–20 storms were responsible for a total of three deaths and three injuries, (Note: The injuries refer to the total amount. One person was directly injured by one of the tornadoes, while two others indirectly.) with two of the deaths being directly attributed to tornadoes. Additionally, the outbreak inflicted approximately $2.688 million (2020 USD) in damages. (Note: See sources for monetary damage losses in the quick facts information box.)

== See also ==
- Weather of 2020
- List of United States tornadoes in April 2020
- List of North American tornadoes and tornado outbreaks
- Tornado outbreak of April 21–23, 2020 – Another tornado outbreak that followed after this one, affecting primarily the southern Great Plains but also the Gulf States
- 2013 Hattiesburg tornado – Another EF4 tornado that struck Hattiesburg, Mississippi and the surrounding metro directly
- 2025 Kentwood–Carson tornado – Another lethal and long-lived EF4 tornado that struck some of the same counties in southern Mississippi
