= 1928 United States presidential election in Alabama =

- November 6, 1928

Nominee	Al Smith	Herbert Hoover
Party	Democratic	Republican
Home state	New York	California
Running mate	Joseph T. Robinson	Charles Curtis
Electoral vote	12	0
Popular vote	127,797	120,753
Percentage	51.33%	48.50%
County results
Smith
50–60%
60–70%
70–80%
80–90%
90–100%
Hoover
50–60%
60–70%
70–80%
President before election
Calvin Coolidge
Republican
Elected President
Herbert Hoover
Republican

The 1928 United States presidential election in Alabama took place on November 6, 1928, as part of the 1928 United States presidential election, which was held throughout all contemporary forty-eight states. Voters chose twelve representatives, or electors to the Electoral College, who voted for president and vice president. This was the last election in which Alabama had twelve electoral votes: the Great Migration caused the state to lose congressional districts after the 1930 Census produced the first Congressional redistricting since 1911.

Alabama voted narrowly for the Democratic nominee, Governor Alfred E. "Al" Smith of New York, over the Republican nominee, former Secretary of Commerce Herbert Hoover of California. Smith's running mate was Senator Joseph Taylor Robinson of Arkansas, while Hoover's running mate was Senate Majority Leader Charles Curtis of Kansas. The only other candidate on the ballot was Socialist Norman Thomas, who received a mere 460 votes.

Since the 1890s, Alabama had become a one-party state ruled by the Democratic Party. Disenfranchisement of almost all African-Americans and a large proportion of poor whites via poll taxes, literacy tests and informal harassment had essentially eliminated opposition parties outside of presidential campaigns in a few northern hill counties. The only competitive statewide elections became Democratic Party primaries, and ever since 1900 the Democratic Party won over two-thirds of the limited number of votes cast even in presidential elections.

Between 1900 and 1924, the southern bloc had been able to veto presidential nominations by extralimital branches of the Democratic Party. This changed before the 1928 election, as most Democrats decided to sit out the convention due to their belief the party had no chance of winning the November election. Consequently, Al Smith, a four-term Governor of New York, was able to win the party's nomination on the first ballot of the 1928 Democratic National Convention.

Four characteristics of Smith made him anything but an ideal candidate for Southern Democrats: he was a devout Catholic, opposed to Prohibition, linked with New York City's Tammany Hall political machine, and the son of Irish and Italian immigrants. Although it is generally thought that the South would have accepted a man possessing one of those characteristics, the combination proved a bitter dose for many of Alabama's loyal Democrats. It was also thought by some, including those close to the revived Ku Klux Klan, that Smith was too friendly with blacks and some Alabama whites unsubtly called Smith "nigger, nigger, nigger." These people did not think Hoover any "safer" on the race issue, although they did prefer Hoover's view on Prohibition.

The conflict between disapproval of Smith's faith and policies on one hand and extreme traditional hostility towards the Republican Party in almost all of Alabama (the only exceptions being the historically anti-secession counties of Winston and a few populist strongholds like Chilton) produced an exceptionally bitter campaign. Black Belt whites – who had controlled the state government since the disenfranchisement of blacks and poor whites – also felt Smith's social views obnoxious, especially his opposition to the Ku Klux Klan. Consequently, many of Alabama's voters swore to vote for Hoover without declaring themselves Republicans, instead calling themselves "Hoovercrats". Defections were particularly pronounced in North Alabama, where a contiguous block of counties from Birmingham northeastwards to the Tennessee border uniformly gave majorities for Hoover. Hoover also won several counties in the far southern coastal regions, whose soils had always proved unsuitable for cotton plantations. On the other hand, the whites of the black belt, who were like Al Smith "wet" (opposed to prohibition of alcohol), did not bolt from the Democratic Party because of this alcohol issue and their strong view that the Democrats were the best safeguard for white supremacy.

== Results ==
1928 United States presidential election in Alabama
Party	Candidate	Votes	Percentage	Electoral votes
Democratic	Al Smith	127,797	51.33%	12
Republican	Herbert Hoover	120,753	48.50%	0
Socialist	Norman Thomas	460	0.18%	0
Voter turnout (voting age)		18.8%		

=== Results by county ===
County	Al Smith Democratic		Herbert Hoover Republican		Norman Thomas Socialist		Margin		Total votes cast
County	#	%	#	%	#	%	#	%	Total votes cast
Autauga	883	56.39%	683	43.61%	0	0.00%	200	12.78%	1,566
Baldwin	1,317	48.44%	1,388	51.05%	14	0.51%	-71	-2.61%	2,719
Barbour	1,507	63.48%	845	35.59%	23	0.97%	662	27.89%	2374
Bibb	1,188	54.02%	1,003	45.61%	8	0.36%	185	8.41%	2,199
Blount	1,607	47.94%	1,745	52.06%	0	0.00%	-138	-4.12%	3,352
Bullock	699	73.73%	249	26.27%	0	0.00%	450	47.46%	948
Butler	1,235	63.86%	699	36.14%	0	0.00%	536	27.72%	1,934
Calhoun	2,117	45.48%	2,537	54.50%	1	0.02%	-420	-9.02%	4,655
Chambers	999	36.58%	1,732	63.42%	0	0.00%	-733	-26.84%	2,731
Cherokee	894	37.05%	1,515	62.78%	4	0.17%	-621	-25.73%	2,413
Chilton	1,402	30.52%	3,186	69.37%	5	0.11%	-1,784	-38.85%	4,593
Choctaw	1,242	74.33%	429	25.67%	0	0.00%	813	48.66%	1671
Clarke	1,662	63.97%	936	36.03%	0	0.00%	726	27.94%	2,598
Clay	978	34.10%	1,889	65.86%	1	0.03%	-911	-31.76%	2,868
Cleburne	794	41.75%	1,108	58.25%	0	0.00%	-314	-16.50%	1,902
Coffee	1,609	60.83%	1,036	39.17%	0	0.00%	573	21.66%	2,645
Colbert	2,596	65.75%	1,249	31.64%	103	2.61%	1,347	34.11%	3,948
Conecuh	858	43.53%	1,113	56.47%	0	0.00%	-255	-12.94%	1,971
Coosa	699	39.31%	1,078	60.63%	1	0.06%	-379	-21.32%	1,778
Covington	2,000	54.26%	1,681	45.60%	5	0.14%	319	8.66%	3,686
Crenshaw	1,314	57.33%	978	42.67%	0	0.00%	336	14.66%	2,292
Cullman	1,574	34.72%	2,959	65.28%	0	0.00%	-1,385	-30.56%	4,533
Dale	1,233	55.19%	1,000	44.76%	1	0.04%	233	10.43%	2,234
Dallas	1,905	72.96%	705	27.00%	1	0.04%	1,200	45.96%	2,611
DeKalb	3,957	40.71%	5,761	59.27%	2	0.02%	-1,804	-18.56%	9,720
Elmore	1,309	42.49%	1,770	57.45%	2	0.06%	-461	-14.96%	3,081
Escambia	1,077	38.03%	1,754	61.94%	1	0.04%	-677	-23.91%	2,832
Etowah	2,484	43.70%	3,162	55.63%	38	0.67%	-678	-11.93%	5,684
Fayette	1,131	40.13%	1,686	59.83%	1	0.04%	-555	-19.70%	2818
Franklin	2,279	43.64%	2,937	56.24%	6	0.11%	-658	-12.60%	5,222
Geneva	1,485	49.20%	1,533	50.80%	0	0.00%	-48	-1.60%	3,018
Greene	601	93.91%	39	6.09%	0	0.00%	562	87.82%	640
Hale	1,048	72.23%	403	27.77%	0	0.00%	645	44.46%	1,451
Henry	815	50.53%	796	49.35%	2	0.12%	19	1.18%	1,613
Houston	2,290	53.81%	1,963	46.12%	3	0.07%	327	7.69%	4,256
Jackson	2,153	41.03%	3,081	58.72%	13	0.25%	-928	-17.69%	5,247
Jefferson	16,735	47.94%	18,060	51.74%	112	0.32%	-1,325	-3.80%	34,907
Lamar	1,412	63.72%	804	36.28%	0	0.00%	608	27.44%	2,216
Lauderdale	2,763	67.82%	1,410	34.61%	1	0.02%	1,353	33.21%	4,074
Lawrence	1,035	50.59%	1,008	49.27%	3	0.15%	27	1.32%	2,046
Lee	1,436	58.97%	1,016	41.72%	3	0.12%	420	17.25%	2,435
Limestone	1,689	80.58%	407	19.42%	0	0.00%	1,282	61.16%	2,096
Lowndes	703	79.61%	180	20.39%	0	0.00%	523	59.22%	883
Macon	526	59.98%	348	39.68%	3	0.34%	178	20.30%	877
Madison	2,681	49.85%	2,695	50.11%	2	0.04%	-14	-0.26%	5,378
Marengo	1,898	71.62%	752	28.38%	0	0.00%	1,146	43.24%	2,650
Marion	1,541	50.87%	1,488	49.13%	0	0.00%	53	1.74%	3,029
Marshall	2,322	47.94%	2,511	51.84%	11	0.23%	-189	-3.90%	4,844
Mobile	5,965	54.07%	5,058	45.84%	10	0.09%	907	8.23%	11,033
Monroe	1,343	57.22%	1,074	45.76%	0	0.00%	269	11.46%	2,347
Montgomery	6,347	67.06%	3,114	32.90%	3	0.03%	3,233	34.16%	9,464
Morgan	3,366	45.12%	4,085	54.76%	9	0.12%	-719	-9.64%	7,460
Perry	1,242	72.97%	459	26.97%	1	0.06%	783	46.00%	1,702
Pickens	1,028	61.85%	634	38.15%	0	0.00%	394	23.70%	1,662
Pike	1,819	76.59%	552	23.24%	4	0.17%	1,267	53.35%	2,375
Randolph	1,257	40.89%	1,815	59.04%	2	0.07%	-558	-18.15%	3,074
Russell	846	70.68%	333	27.82%	18	1.50%	513	42.86%	1,197
St. Clair	1,313	33.70%	2,581	66.25%	2	0.05%	-1,268	-32.55%	3,896
Shelby	1,679	39.95%	2,502	59.53%	22	0.52%	-823	-19.58%	4,203
Sumter	1,015	84.16%	191	15.84%	0	0.00%	824	68.32%	1,206
Talladega	1,693	51.18%	1,602	48.43%	13	0.39%	91	2.75%	3,308
Tallapoosa	1,849	59.51%	1,257	40.46%	1	0.03%	592	19.05%	3,107
Tuscaloosa	2,769	69.56%	1,210	30.39%	2	0.05%	1,559	39.17%	3,981
Walker	4,228	53.77%	3,635	46.23%	0	0.00%	593	7.54%	7,863
Washington	718	58.18%	515	41.73%	1	0.08%	203	16.45%	1,234
Wilcox	979	78.57%	266	21.35%	1	0.08%	713	57.22%	1,246
Winston	659	24.01%	2,085	75.96%	1	0.04%	-1,426	-51.95%	2,745
Totals	127,796	51.33%	120,725	48.49%	460	0.18%	7,071	2.84%	248,981

== Analysis ==
Overall, Smith held the state by just over seven thousand votes, although opponents of Smith believed that electoral fraud was widespread in the Black Belt. State judges Hugh Locke, Horace Wilkinson and Ira Champion argued that up to seventeen thousand ballots for Hoover had been rejected. No recount, however, was ever contemplated by authorities. This result constitutes the third-closest presidential election in Alabama's history after that of 1980, another Republican landslide (this time affected by the personal vote in the South for President Jimmy Carter, a lifelong Georgian), and that of 1848, when Democratic nominee Lewis Cass won the state by 1.12 percentage points while narrowly losing the presidency to Southern Whig nominee Zachary Taylor, who was living in Louisiana.

A strong correlation was revealed between the percentage of blacks in the population and (white) voter loyalty to the Democratic Party (with the r-value equaling 0.7268): of the twenty-six counties won by Hoover, only five had a population over thirty percent Negro, and most of these were urban areas less attached to the traditions of black belt politics, while Chambers County was the home of Hoovercrat senator J. Thomas Heflin. At the other extreme, of the ten counties possessing populations under ten percent African American in 1930, (Note: Alabama counties with a 1930 population less than ten percent Negro were Blount, Cherokee, Cleburne, Cullman, DeKalb, Franklin, Jackson, Marion, Marshall and Winston. Calvin Coolidge had won Cleburne, DeKalb, Franklin, and Winston in 1924, whilst Warren G. Harding won all these four plus Cullman in 1920.) only Marion County stayed loyal to Smith and only by a very narrow margin.

== See also ==
- United States presidential elections in Alabama
