= Curley Money =

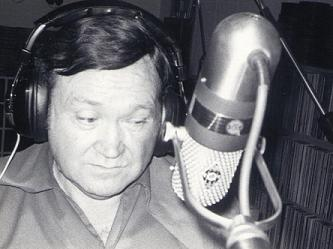

Background information
- Born: Robert Earnest Money; March 20, 1925; Haleburg, Alabama, U.S.
- Died: December 23, 2003 (aged 78) Columbus, Georgia, U.S.
- Genres: Rockabilly
- Occupations: Musician, singer
- Instrument: Fiddle

Curley Money (March 20, 1925 – December 23, 2003) was an American rockabilly musician.

Robert Earnest Money, known by his stage name Curley Money, was the youngest of eight children born to Andrew Jackson "Bud" Money, a sharecropper, and Lillia Otelia Cullpepper Money in Haleburg, Alabama. Only eight years old when he first developed musical interests, Money could later be found fiddling at barn dances on Saturday nights in Henry County for extra cash. In 1942 he moved to Columbus, Georgia to find work in the Cotton Mills. While there, his dream of being a country artist and songwriter manifested. He toured nationally with the group he assembled, “The Rhythm Ramblers”. Traveling along with his group was his nephew, Comer Money. Comer went on to publish several records in the 1960s under his uncle’s record labels. The group's popularity continued to grow and finally, they landed a radio show on WGBA Radio in Columbus. Later they made several regular appearances on WRBL TV as part of the “Spec and Doyal Wright Show”.

In 1956 Money launched record label, Rambler Records. ”Playing the Game”/”Why must I cry” was the label's first release, in April 1956; it was a great success and prompted him to continue with other releases such as “Gonna Rock” which made it to #3 on Billboard Chart. He later had to change the name of his label to Money Records. He failed to get proper copyrights on the first label, and another company took his label name. He released a total of 42 singles through 1965.

Another release of Money’s caused quite a stir in the 1990s. “Chang Gang Charlie” remained hidden away in Sun Records, located in Memphis, Tennessee, for over 30 years until it was included on two compilations of previously unreleased material by Charly and Bear Family Records. This song was recorded on September 4, 1956, in Sun Studios.

The Gold Standard record label in Nashville served as the home for some of the later recordings of Money, whose recordings extended into the 1970s. Simultaneously, Money was managing several local nightclubs in Columbus, like the locally-famous Green Valley Club located out River Road. He also maintained a day job as a radio announcer on WHYD in Columbus. Buffalo Bop issued an LP, Buffalo Bop 2003, with 12 tracks by Money in 1985.

Money was inducted into the Rockabilly Hall of Fame in 2003. He performed at a number of dance halls between Columbus and Nashville in those days. He continued to perform in the Columbus area for several years until landing his last and longest running gig ever. This one would last him over 15 years with the same band at the Gallops Senior Center. There he could be found entertaining some of his lifelong friends and fans and singing those hits that made him famous until he died on December 23, 2003, in Columbus, Georgia.

== Sources ==
- "Curley Money", Author: C. Scott Money, October 22, 2008. Columbus, GA
- Richard Hyatt, Front Page, Friday, September 19, 1997, "Sun Shines at last on Columbus Musician", Columbus Ledger Enquirer
- Brad Barnes, Music, January 9, 2004, "Curley's gone, but his battered guitar plays on", Columbus Ledger-Enquirer
- Rune Halland, Cover, Issue no. 103, November 1976, Rock & Roll International Magazine
- Terry Gordon, Rockin Country Style, Hugh F. MacMillan Law Library of Emory University,
- Dik de Heer, Black Cat Rockabilly Europe, "This is My Story", Founded 1993, http://www.rockabilly.nl/references/messages/curley_money.htm
