= Grandberry Crossroads, Alabama =

Unincorporated community in Alabama, United States

Granberry Crossroads, Alabama
- Unincorporated community
- Location within Alabama Location within the United States
- Coordinates: 31°21′16″N 85°13′43″W
- Country: United States
- State: Alabama
- County: Henry
- Elevation: 312 ft (95 m)
- Time zone: UTC-6 (Central (CST))
  - Summer (DST): UTC-5 (CDT)
- Area code: 334
- GNIS feature ID: 156424

Granberry Crossroads is an unincorporated community in Henry County, Alabama, United States. Granberry Crossroads is located on Alabama State Route 134, 7.1 miles (11.4 km) east of Headland.
