= American Brass Superfund site =

Environmental cleanup site in Alabama

American Brass Inc.
- Superfund site
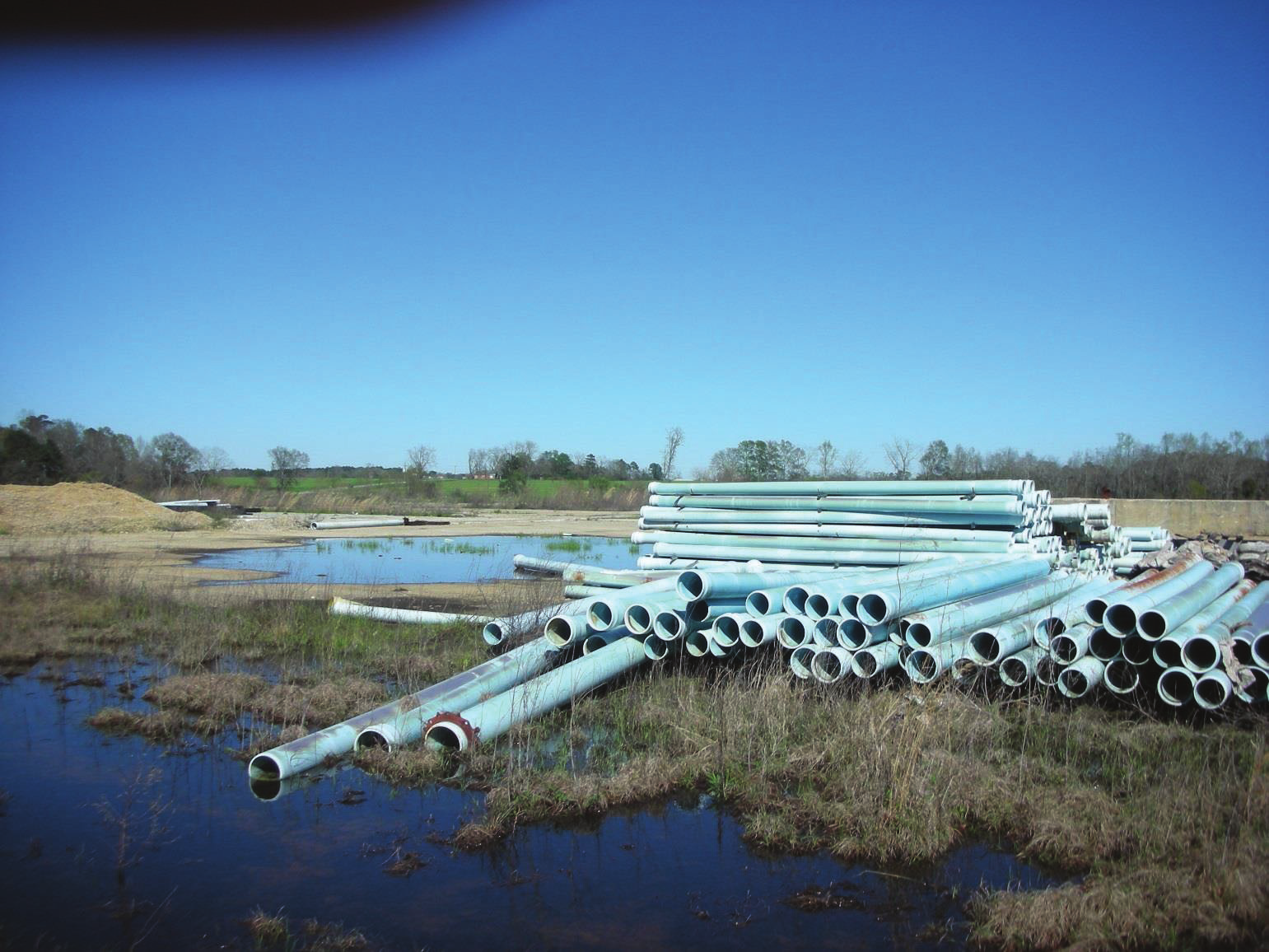
- Foundation of former foundry building with irrigation supplies in open storage.

- Location within Alabama
- Location: Headland, Henry, Alabama; 31°19′30″N 85°24′15″W

Information
- CERCLIS ID: ALD981868466
- Contaminants: Aluminum; Ammonia; Arsenic; Boron; Cadmium; Chromium; Copper; DDT; Iron; Lead; Manganese; Nitrate; Polychlorinated biphenyls; Selenium; Thallium; Vanadium; Zinc
- Responsible parties: None

Progress
- Proposed: January 19, 1999
- Listed: May 10, 1999
- Construction completed: September 1, 2009

The American Brass Superfund site is a former industrial site, located in Henry County, Alabama. American Brass Inc. (ABI) operated a brass smelter and foundry facility on the site between 1978 and 1992. Prior to its closure in December 1992, the company had been cited by the United States Environmental Protection Agency (EPA), and the Alabama Department of Environmental Management, (ADEM), on several occasions for Resource Conservation and Recovery Act (RCRA) violations, arising from its waste and hazardous waste disposal processes. Site surveys, conducted by ADEM after ABI ceased operations, revealed stockpiles of 150,000 tons of contaminated waste, and extensive soil and groundwater contamination. The Site is slated for agricultural land usage.

== Clean Up Activities ==
After assessment by the EPA, it was added to the National Priorities List, in May 1999, for long-term remedial action. While soil remediation has been successful on the site, groundwater contamination remains a concern as of 2024.

Although it has been subject to a joint clean-up effort between the EPA and ADEM following the issuing of the 2006 clean-up plan, in 2014 the EPA found that they had made no progress towards the 30-year clean-up goal. Despite the discovery that the groundwater strategy was ineffective, and a 2020 study recommending a new treatment plant, the EPA spokesperson for Region 4 has decided not to proceed with it despite community pressure, due to cost and price sharing issues with the State government.

== Timeline ==
=== 1996 ===
EPA and ADEM jointly conducted removal actions at the site to reduce short term risks from former ABI industrial facilities, such as ball mill residue, soil contaminated with heavy metals.

=== 1998 ===
EPA conducts second removal action

=== 2006 ===
The EPA creates a long term clean up plan to the contamination, mainly relying upon natural processes to reduce contaminant levels over time, as well as continued off site disposals.

=== 2009 ===
Unlimited Soil Usage was allowed following off-site disposals, groundwater usage restricted.

=== 2010 ===
Regular groundwater sampling begins.

=== 2013 ===
Minor fire causes damage at site, raising asbestos concerns, leading to building demolition.

=== 2014 ===
EPA five-year review shows 30-year groundwater clean up timeline has not progressed.

=== 2019 ===
Second five-year review shows no significant reduction in contamination.

=== 2020 ===
New study begins for groundwater remediation optimization, COVID-19 disrupts planned reviews.

=== 2024 ===
Third five-year review shows no significant reduction in groundwater contamination.

== See also ==
- List of Superfund sites
- Groundwater remediation
- Soil contamination
