= Edwin, Alabama =

Unincorporated community in Alabama, United States

- Unincorporated community
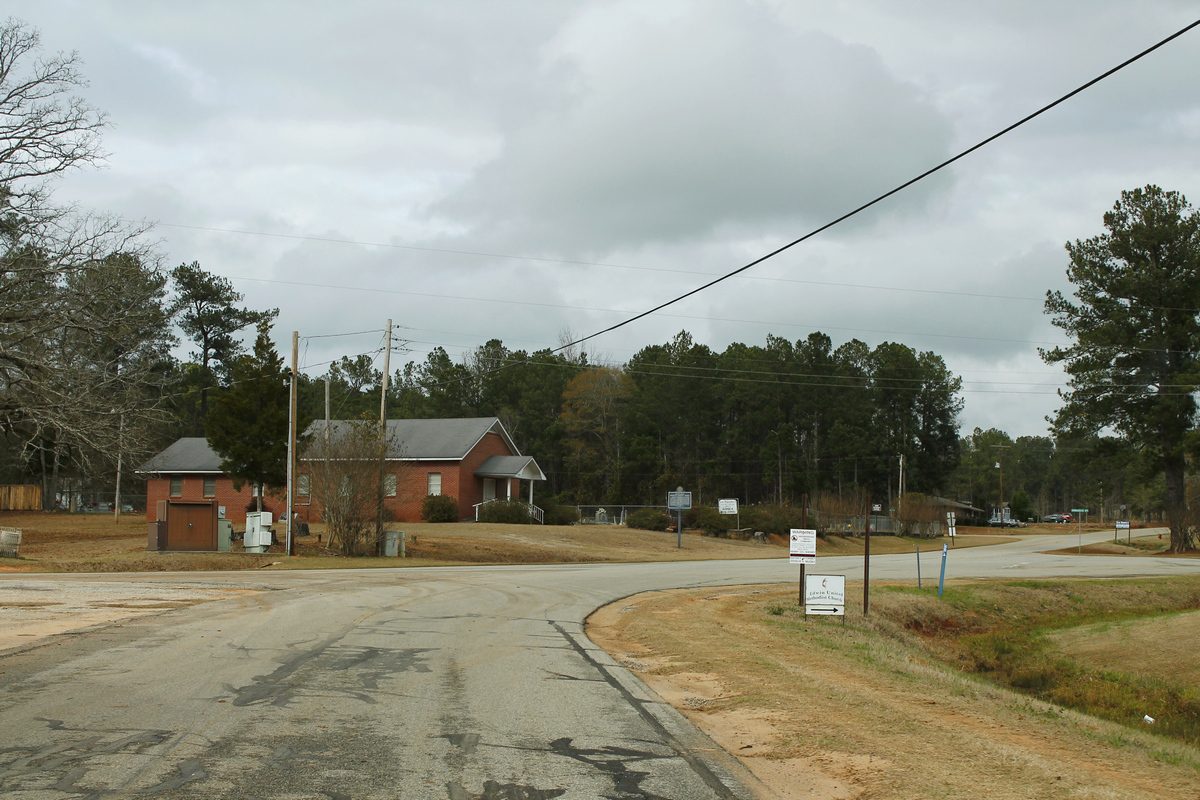

- Location within Alabama Location within the United States
- Coordinates: 31°39′56″N 85°22′31″W
- Country: United States
- State: Alabama
- County: Henry
- Elevation: 387 ft (118 m)
- Time zone: UTC-6 (Central (CST))
  - Summer (DST): UTC-5 (CDT)
- Area code: 334
- GNIS feature ID: 117883

Edwin is an unincorporated community in Henry County, Alabama, United States.

== History ==
Edwin is most likely named after a person who lived in the area, but the origin is uncertain. A post office operated under the name Edwin from 1892 to 1906. Mount Enon Primitive Baptist Church, located in Edwin, was constituted on April 23, 1860.
