= Wills Crossroads, Alabama =

Unincorporated community in Alabama, United States

- Unincorporated community
- Location within Alabama Location within the United States
- Coordinates: 31°33′23″N 85°10′47″W
- Country: United States
- State: Alabama
- County: Henry
- Elevation: 433 ft (132 m)
- Time zone: UTC-6 (Central (CST))
  - Summer (DST): UTC-5 (CDT)
- Area code: 334
- GNIS feature ID: 129062

Wills Crossroads is an unincorporated community in Henry County, Alabama, United States. Wills Crossroads is located on Alabama State Route 10, 4.4 miles (7.1 km) east of Abbeville.
