= Balkum, Alabama =

Unincorporated community in Alabama, United States

- Unincorporated community
- Location within Alabama Location within the United States
- Coordinates: 31°25′04″N 85°13′39″W
- Country: United States
- State: Alabama
- County: Henry
- Elevation: 377 ft (115 m)
- Time zone: UTC-6 (Central (CST))
  - Summer (DST): UTC-5 (CDT)
- Area code: 334
- GNIS feature ID: 113416

Balkum is an unincorporated community in Henry County, Alabama, United States.

== History ==
Balkum is named after James Whitfield Balkum, who settled the area in 1870. Balkum Baptist Church and Balkum Methodist Church were both constructed in 1887. The Balkum Cemetery is adjacent to Balkum Baptist Church. The Balkum schoolhouse stood north of the cemetery, before closing in 1910.

A post office operated under the name Balkum from 1883 to 1903. After the post office closed, most of the business activity moved to Tumbleton.
