= Graball, Alabama =

Unincorporated community in Alabama, US

- Unincorporated community
- Location within Alabama Location within the United States
- Coordinates: 31°35′12″N 85°16′33″W
- Country: United States
- State: Alabama
- County: Henry
- Elevation: 482 ft (147 m)
- Time zone: UTC-6 (Central (CST))
  - Summer (DST): UTC-5 (CDT)
- Area code: 334

Graball is an unincorporated community in Henry County, Alabama, United States.

Graball has been noted for its unusual place name.
