= Shorterville, Alabama =

Unincorporated community in Alabama, United States

- Unincorporated community
- Location within Alabama Location within the United States
- Coordinates: 31°34′13″N 85°06′05″W
- Country: United States
- State: Alabama
- County: Henry
- Elevation: 420 ft (130 m)
- Time zone: UTC-6 (Central (CST))
  - Summer (DST): UTC-5 (CDT)
- ZIP code: 36373
- Area code: 334
- GNIS feature ID: 126819

Shorterville is an unincorporated community in Henry County, Alabama, United States. Shorterville is located on Alabama State Route 10, 8.8 miles (14.2 km) east of Abbeville. Shorterville has a post office with ZIP code 36373.

== Gallery ==
Below are photographs taken in Shorterville as part of the Historic American Buildings Survey:

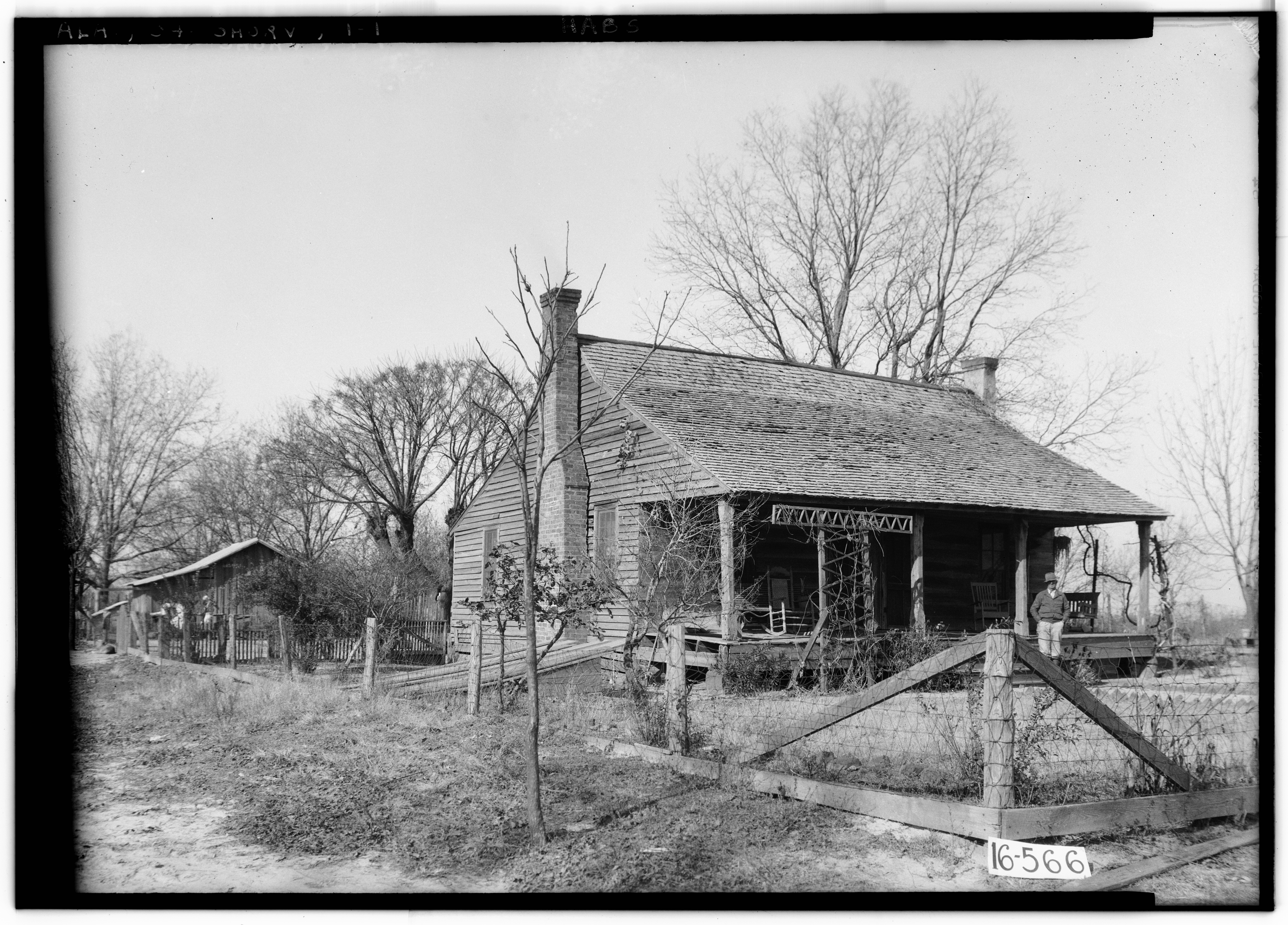
Colonel Baldwin M. Fluker House

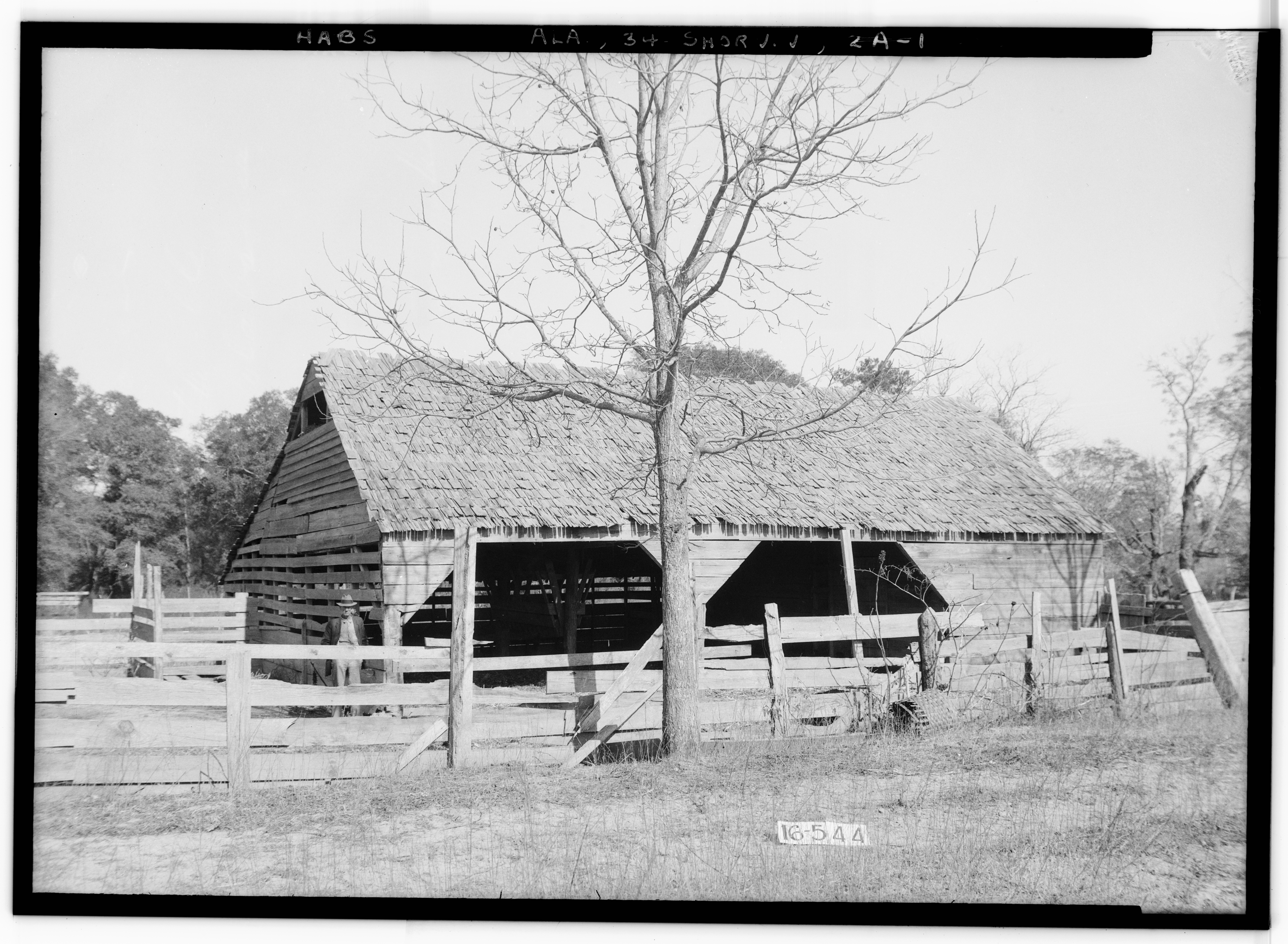
Barn at Bartlett Smith House

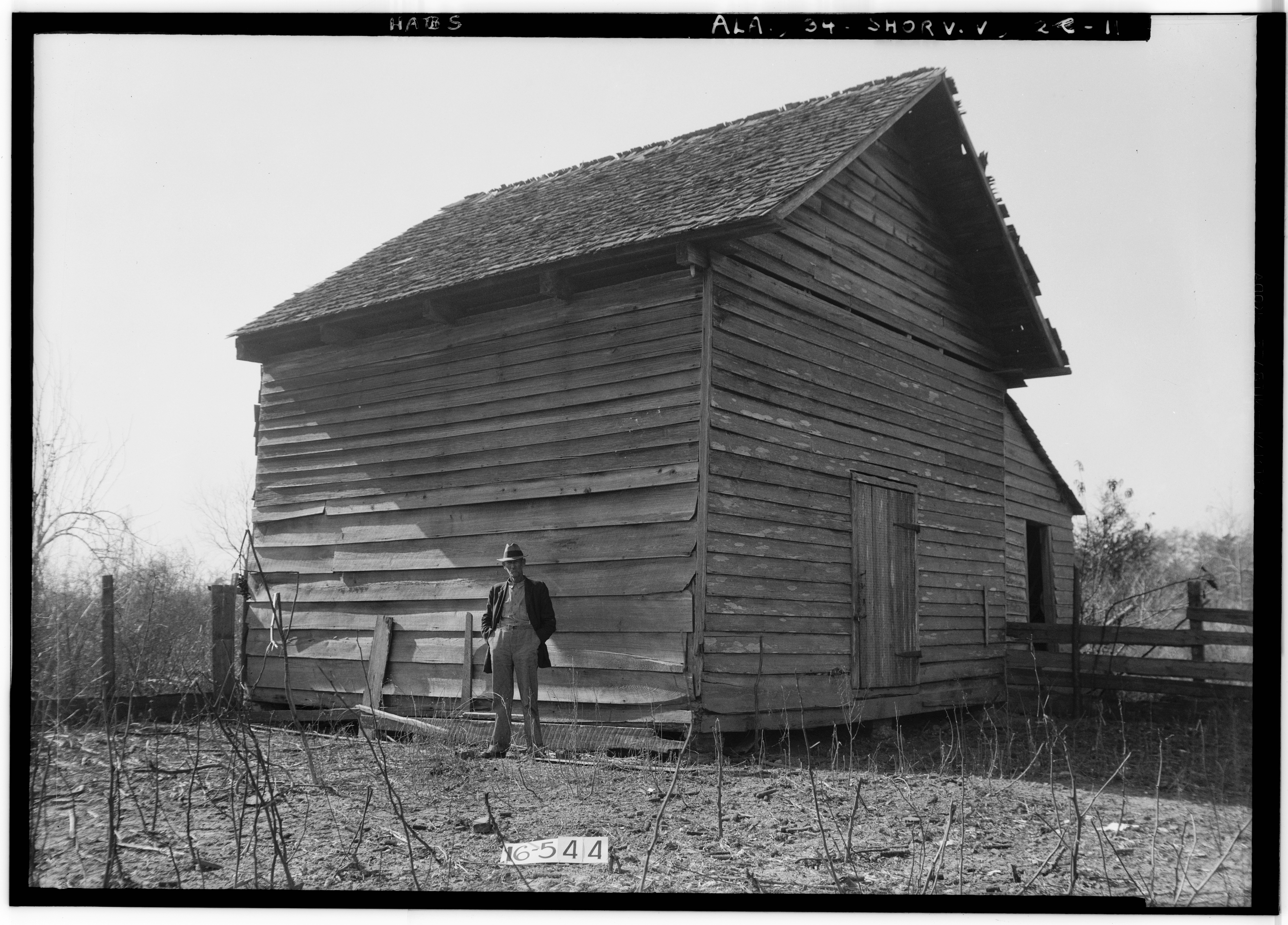
Smoke house at Bartlett Smith House

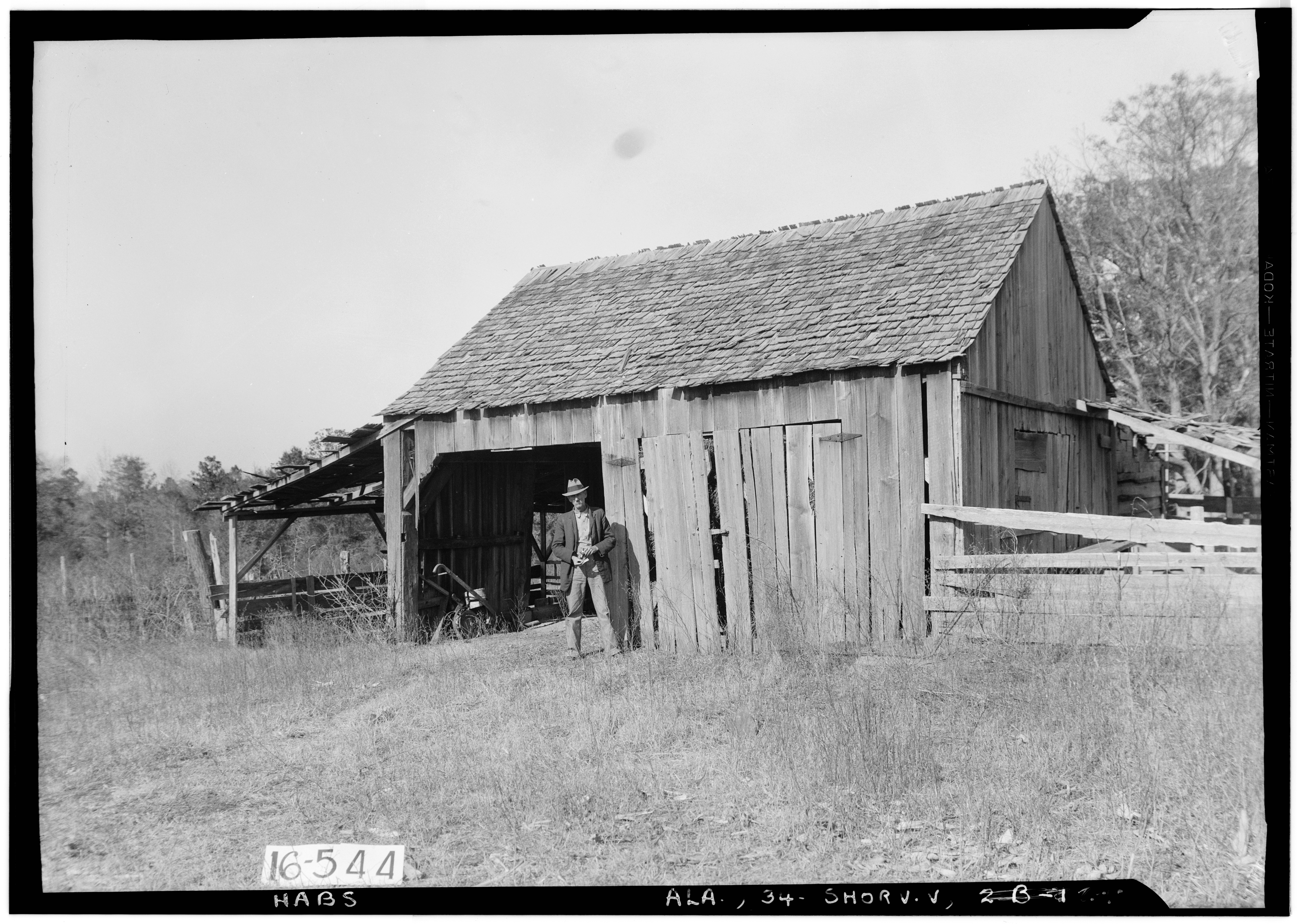
Old shop at Bartlett Smith House

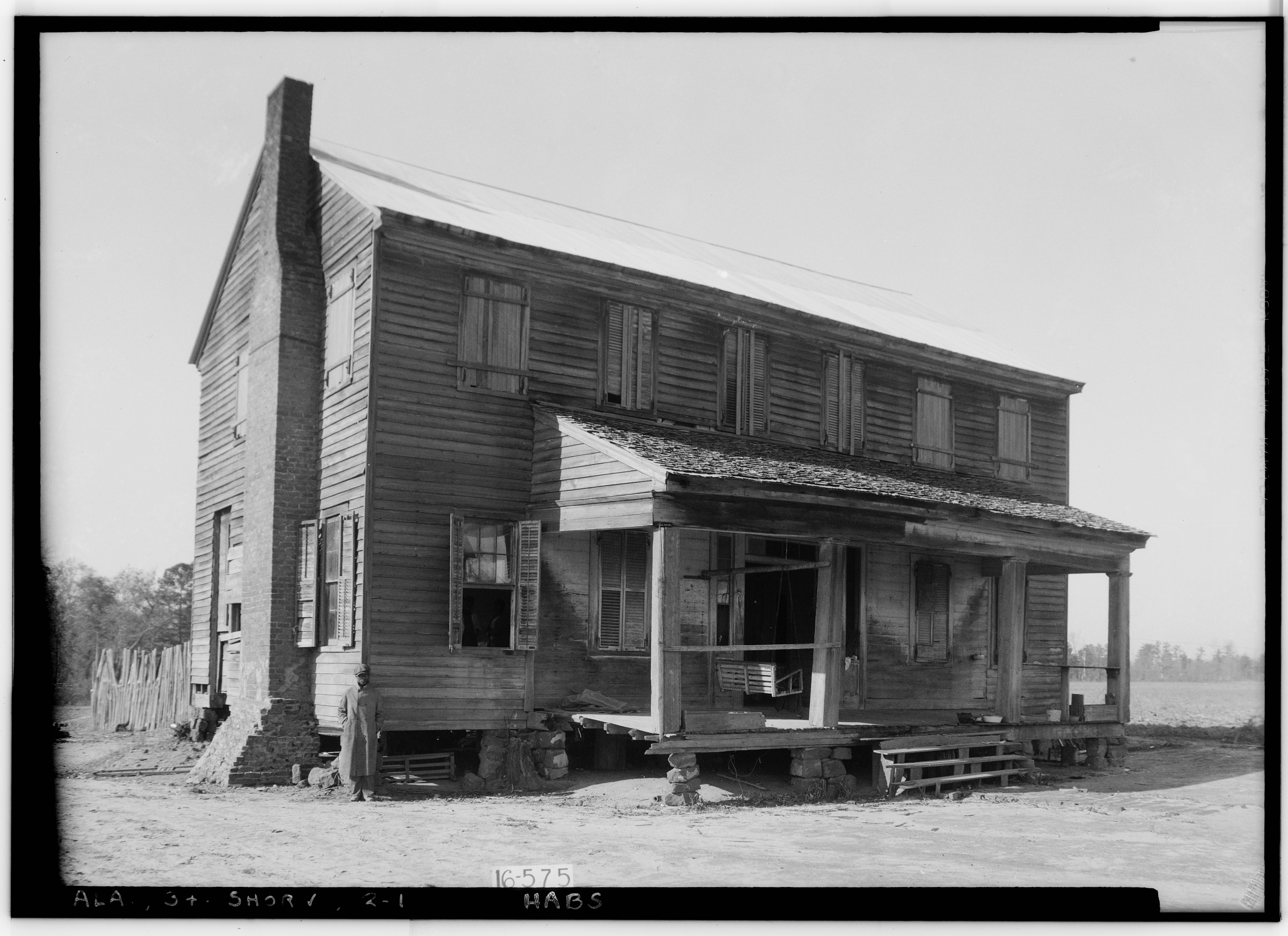
Chitley House
