= Capps, Alabama =

Unincorporated community in Alabama, United States

- Unincorporated community
- Location within Alabama Location within the United States
- Coordinates: 31°29′50″N 85°18′43″W
- Country: United States
- State: Alabama
- County: Henry
- Elevation: 423 ft (129 m)
- Time zone: UTC-6 (Central (CST))
  - Summer (DST): UTC-5 (CDT)
- Area code: 334
- GNIS feature ID: 115606

Capps, also known as Choctawhatchee, is an unincorporated community in Henry County, Alabama, United States. Capps is located on Alabama State Route 173, 7.2 miles (11.6 km) southeast of Abbeville.

== History ==
Capps is named after Daniel W. Capps, the community's first postmaster. A post office operated under the name Capps from 1849 to 1972. Capps served as a shipping point for agricultural products between Abbeville and Headland.
