= Otho, Alabama =

Unincorporated community in Alabama, US

- Unincorporated community
- Location within Alabama Location within the United States
- Coordinates: 31°41′23″N 85°07′47″W
- Country: United States
- State: Alabama
- County: Henry
- Elevation: 217 ft (66 m)
- Time zone: UTC-6 (Central (CST))
  - Summer (DST): UTC-5 (CDT)
- Area code: 334
- GNIS feature ID: 156846

Otho is an unincorporated community in Henry County, Alabama, United States. Otho is located on the Chattahoochee River, 10.8 miles (17.4 km) northeast of Abbeville.
