= Haleburg, Alabama =

- Town
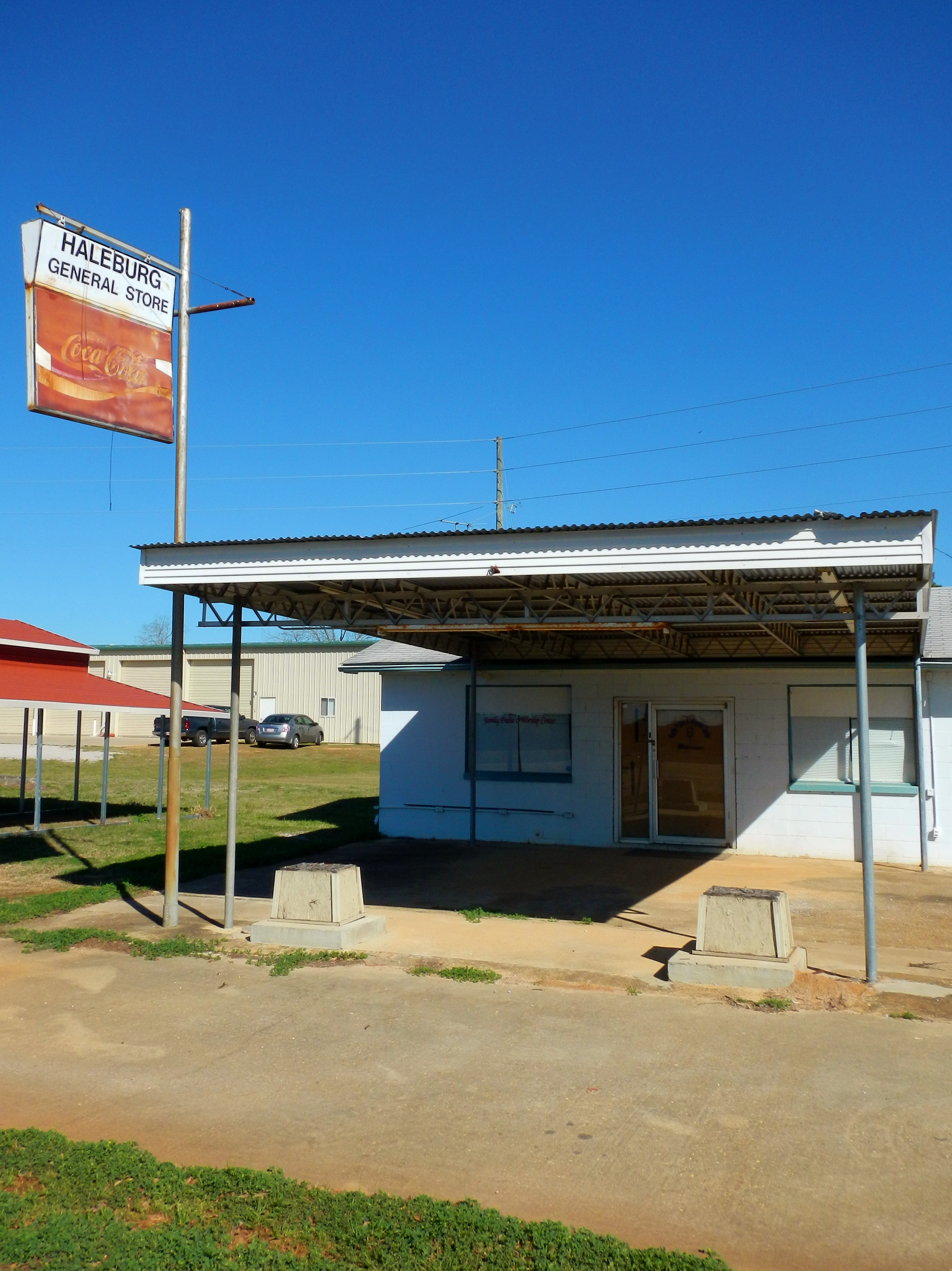
- Haleburg General Store

- Location of Haleburg in Henry County, Alabama.
- Coordinates: 31°24′35″N 85°07′53″W
- Country: United States
- State: Alabama
- County: Henry

Area
  - Total: 3.84 sq mi (9.94 km^{2})
  - Land: 3.84 sq mi (9.94 km^{2})
  - Water: 0 sq mi (0.00 km^{2})
- Elevation: 345 ft (105 m)

Population (2020)
  - Total: 112
  - Density: 29.2/sq mi (11.27/km^{2})
- Time zone: UTC-6 (Central (CST))
  - Summer (DST): UTC-5 (CDT)
- ZIP Code: 36319
- Area code: 334
- FIPS code: 01-32656
- GNIS feature ID: 2406636

Haleburg is a town in Henry County, Alabama, United States. It is part of the Dothan, Alabama Metropolitan Statistical Area. At the 2020 census, the population was 112. Established in 1885 as "Halesburgh", the town was incorporated in September 1911, as "Halesburg". Since then, for reasons unknown, it has become known as the current "Haleburg".

== Geography ==
Haleburg is located in southeastern Henry County. Alabama State Route 95 passes through the town, leading north 14 miles (23 km) to Abbeville and south 8 miles (13 km) to Columbia. Haleburg is 4 miles (6 km) west of the Chattahoochee River, which forms the Alabama–Georgia border.

According to the U.S. Census Bureau, the town has a total area of 3.8 square miles (9.9 km^{2}), all land.

== Demographics ==
Historical population
Census	Pop.	Note	%±
1930	274		—
1940	232		−15.3%
1950	93		−59.9%
1970	104		—
1980	106		1.9%
1990	97		−8.5%
2000	108		11.3%
2010	103		−4.6%
2020	112		8.7%
U.S. Decennial Census; 2013 Estimate

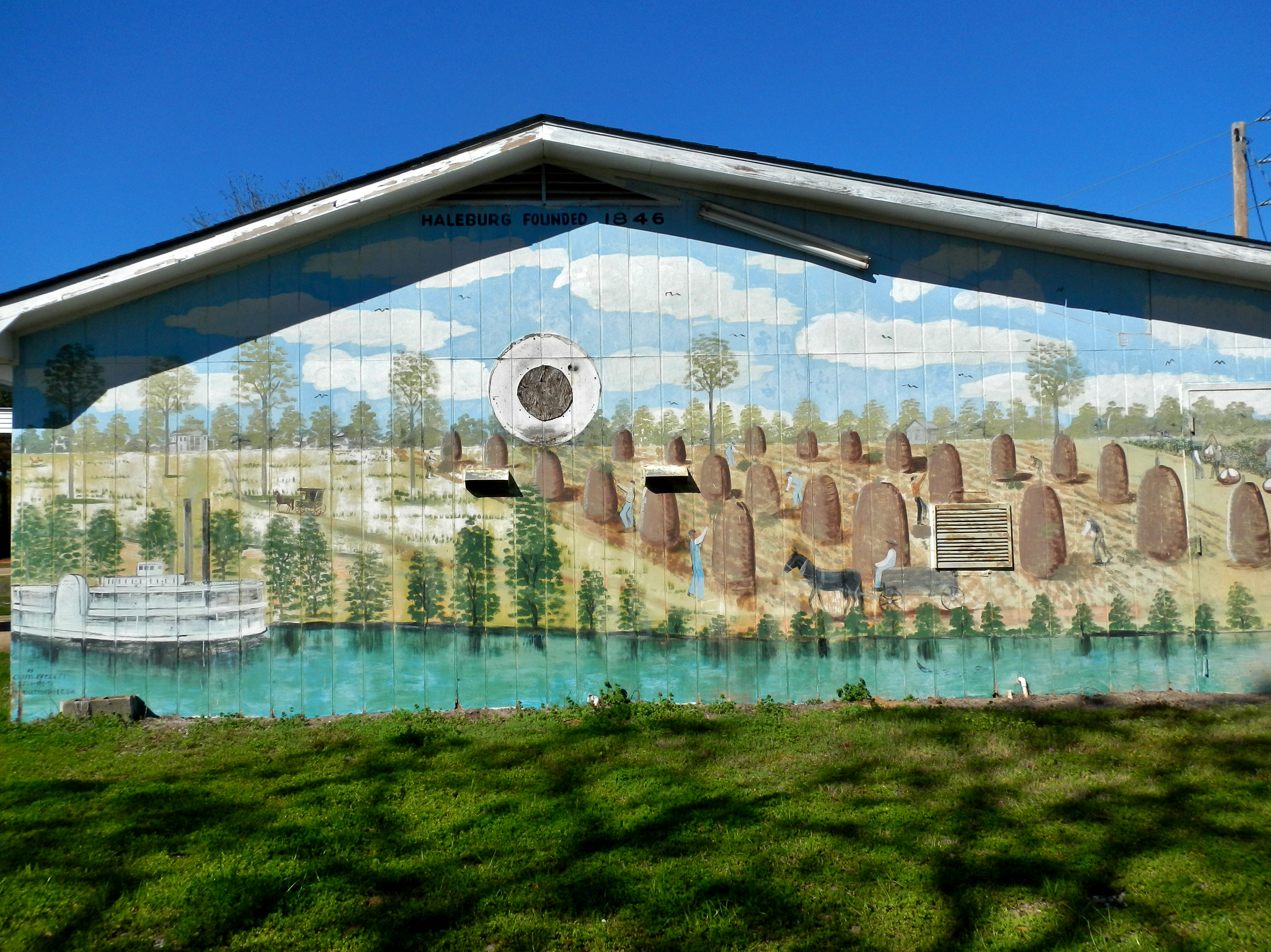
A mural in Haleburg depicts the town's agricultural history and its ties to the nearby Chattahoochee River.

As of the census of 2000, there were 108 people, 48 households, and 36 families residing in the town. The population density was 28.1 inhabitants per square mile (10.8/km^{2}). There were 60 housing units at an average density of 15.6 per square mile (6.0/km^{2}). The racial makeup of the town was 77.78% White, 18.52% Black or African American, and 3.70% from two or more races. 0.93% of the population were Hispanic or Latino of any race.

There were 48 households, out of which 22.9% had children under the age of 18 living with them, 56.3% were married couples living together, 10.4% had a female householder with no husband present, and 25.0% were non-families. 25.0% of all households were made up of individuals, and 12.5% had someone living alone who was 65 years of age or older. The average household size was 2.25 and the average family size was 2.67.

In the town, the population was spread out, with 20.4% under the age of 18, 6.5% from 18 to 24, 23.1% from 25 to 44, 28.7% from 45 to 64, and 21.3% who were 65 years of age or older. The median age was 45 years. For every 100 females, there were 100.0 males. For every 100 females age 18 and over, there were 95.5 males.

The median income for a household in the town was $25,500, and the median income for a family was $28,750. Males had a median income of $30,417 versus $21,250 for females. The per capita income for the town was $11,657. There were 14.3% of families and 23.3% of the population living below the poverty line, including 35.7% of under eighteens and 18.5% of those over 64.

== Notable people ==
- Grover C. Hall, newspaper editor
- Monte Irvin, former Negro league and Major League Baseball player
- Curley Money, rockabilly musician inducted into the Rockabilly Hall of Fame in 2003
