= 1924 United States presidential election in Alabama =

- November 4, 1924

Nominee	John W. Davis	Calvin Coolidge
Party	Democratic	Republican
Home state	West Virginia	Massachusetts
Running mate	Charles W. Bryan	Charles G. Dawes
Electoral vote	12	0
Popular vote	112,966	45,005
Percentage	67.8%	27.0%
County results
Davis
40–50%
50–60%
60–70%
70–80%
80–90%
90–100%
Coolidge
50–60%
60–70%
President before election
Calvin Coolidge
Republican
Elected President
Calvin Coolidge
Republican

The 1924 United States presidential election in Alabama occurred on November 4, 1924, as a part of the nationwide presidential election, which took place throughout all 48 contemporary states. Voters chose twelve representatives, or electors, to the Electoral College, who voted for president and vice president.

Since the 1890s, Alabama had been effectively a one-party state ruled by the Democratic Party. Disenfranchisement of almost all African-Americans and a large proportion of poor whites via poll taxes, literacy tests and informal harassment had essentially eliminated opposition parties outside of Unionist Winston County and a few nearby northern hill counties that had been Populist strongholds. The only competitive statewide elections became Democratic Party primaries that were limited by law to white voters. Unlike most other Confederate states, however, soon after black disenfranchisement Alabama's remaining white Republicans made rapid efforts to expel blacks from the state Republican Party. Indeed, under Oscar D. Street, who ironically was appointed state party boss as part of the pro-Taft “black and tan” faction in 1912, the state GOP would permanently turn “lily-white”, with the last black delegates from the state at any Republican National Convention serving in 1920.

The 1920 election, aided by isolationism in Appalachia and the whitening of the state GOP, saw the Republicans gain their best presidential vote share in Alabama since 1884, while the GOP even exceed forty percent in the House of Representatives races for the 4th, 7th and 10th congressional districts. However, isolationist sentiment in Appalachia would ease after the election of Warren G. Harding and funding issues meant the Republicans would not run a candidate for any Alabama congressional district in 1922.

With the ebbing of isolationist sentiment and a conservative Southern Democrat supportive of poll taxes and opposed to women's suffrage in John W. Davis of West Virginia nominated after an extremely prolonged convention, neither Davis nor incumbent Republican President Calvin Coolidge nor “La Follette/Wheeler” candidate Robert M. La Follette visited Alabama. No polls were taken in the state, which had given every Democrat since 1876 over sixty percent, and ultimately Davis won Alabama with over sixty-seven percent of the vote. Despite the severe impediments of Alabama's cumulative poll tax, La Follette did reach into double digits in industrialised Jefferson, Baldwin, and Morgan Counties, but overall he polled only just under five percent of Alabama's ballots, making it his eighth-weakest state.

== Results ==
1924 United States presidential election in Alabama
Party	Candidate	Votes	%
Democratic	John W. Davis	112,966	69.80%
Republican	Calvin Coolidge (incumbent)	45,005 (Note: This total excludes an uncertain figure for Franklin County.)	27.00%
Progressive	Robert M. La Follette	8,084	4.90%
National Prohibition	Herman P. Faris	538	0.30%
Total votes		166,593	100%

=== Results by county ===
County	John W. Davis Democratic		Calvin Coolidge Republican		Robert M. La Follette Progressive		Herman P. Faris National Prohibition		Margin		Total votes cast
County	#	%	#	%	#	%	#	%	#	%	Total votes cast
Autauga	781	81.87%	146	15.30%	22	2.31%	5	0.52%	635	66.56%	954
Baldwin	1,023	51.72%	549	27.76%	392	19.82%	14	0.71%	474	23.96%	1,978
Barbour	1,340	91.59%	78	5.33%	40	2.73%	5	0.34%	1,262	86.26%	1,463
Bibb	875	63.68%	251	18.27%	240	17.47%	8	0.58%	624	45.41%	1,374
Blount	2,083	56.15%	1,518	40.92%	103	2.78%	6	0.16%	565	15.23%	3,710
Bullock	763	98.83%	8	1.04%	1	0.13%	0	0.00%	755	97.80%	772
Butler	1,050	83.33%	95	7.54%	115	9.13%	0	0.00%	935 (Note: In this county where La Follette ran second ahead of Coolidge, margin goven is Davis vote minus La Follette vote and percentage margin Davis percentage minus La Follette percentage.)	74.21%	1,260
Calhoun	1,907	67.65%	766	27.17%	129	4.58%	17	0.60%	1,141	40.48%	2,819
Chambers	1,922	91.00%	146	6.91%	43	2.04%	1	0.05%	1,776	84.09%	2,112
Cherokee	1,380	60.63%	845	37.13%	45	1.98%	6	0.26%	535	23.51%	2,276
Chilton	848	33.60%	1,595	63.19%	75	2.97%	6	0.24%	-747	-29.60%	2,524
Choctaw	1,021	97.80%	19	1.82%	2	0.19%	2	0.19%	1,002	95.98%	1,044
Clarke	1,059	91.93%	78	6.77%	12	1.04%	3	0.26%	981	85.16%	1,152
Clay	1,597	59.88%	1,017	38.13%	49	1.84%	4	0.15%	580	21.75%	2,667
Cleburne	622	45.74%	696	51.18%	38	2.79%	4	0.29%	-74	-5.44%	1,360
Coffee	1,597	82.11%	323	16.61%	20	1.03%	5	0.26%	1,274	65.50%	1,945
Colbert	1,503	65.98%	576	25.29%	189	8.30%	10	0.44%	927	40.69%	2,278
Conecuh	955	88.10%	92	8.49%	31	2.86%	6	0.55%	863	79.61%	1,084
Coosa	790	60.12%	508	38.66%	15	1.14%	1	0.08%	282	21.46%	1,314
Covington	1,776	85.88%	156	7.54%	132	6.38%	4	0.19%	1,620	78.34%	2,068
Crenshaw	1,107	89.06%	117	9.41%	8	0.64%	11	0.88%	990	79.65%	1,243
Cullman	1,809	49.79%	1,639	45.11%	180	4.95%	5	0.14%	170	4.68%	3,633
Dale	1,117	77.52%	297	20.61%	22	1.53%	5	0.35%	820	56.90%	1,441
Dallas	1,948	91.76%	50	2.36%	125	5.89%	0	0.00%	1,823	85.87%	2,123
DeKalb	3,003	46.65%	3,434	53.35%	0	0.00%	0	0.00%	-431	-6.70%	6,437
Elmore	1,088	81.62%	219	16.43%	15	1.13%	11	0.83%	869	65.19%	1,333
Escambia	1,217	85.70%	152	10.70%	46	3.24%	5	0.35%	1,065	75.00%	1,420
Etowah	3,081	61.41%	1,664	33.17%	242	4.82%	30	0.60%	1,417	28.24%	5,017
Fayette	1,358	57.35%	977	41.26%	30	1.27%	3	0.13%	381	16.09%	2,368
Franklin	1,985	46.59%	2,208 (Note: Sources vary in the Republican total for this county.)	51.82%	65	1.53%	3	0.07%	-223	-5.23%	4,261
Geneva	1,191	69.53%	477	27.85%	39	2.28%	6	0.35%	714	41.68%	1,713
Greene	408	98.31%	5	1.20%	1	0.24%	1	0.24%	403	97.11%	415
Hale	856	96.72%	23	2.60%	4	0.45%	2	0.23%	833	94.12%	885
Henry	816	78.84%	179	17.29%	37	3.57%	3	0.29%	637	61.55%	1,035
Houston	1,731	83.87%	242	11.72%	83	4.02%	8	0.39%	1,489	72.14%	2,064
Jackson	1,923	66.11%	885	30.42%	86	2.96%	15	0.52%	1,038	35.68%	2,909
Jefferson	15,133	63.64%	5,678	23.88%	2,808	11.81%	161	0.68%	9,455	39.76%	23,780
Lamar	1,087	79.40%	262	19.14%	18	1.31%	2	0.15%	825	60.26%	1,369
Lauderdale	2,266	71.30%	823	25.90%	80	2.52%	9	0.28%	1,443	45.41%	3,178
Lawrence	990	67.26%	468	31.79%	12	0.82%	2	0.14%	522	35.46%	1,472
Lee	1,290	85.77%	98	6.52%	111	7.38%	5	0.33%	1,179	78.39%	1,504
Limestone	1,415	87.35%	136	8.40%	51	3.15%	18	1.11%	1,279	78.95%	1,620
Lowndes	602	95.86%	5	0.80%	20	3.18%	1	0.16%	582	92.68%	628
Macon	538	91.34%	48	8.15%	2	0.34%	1	0.17%	490	83.19%	589
Madison	2,166	83.76%	368	14.23%	49	1.89%	3	0.12%	1,798	69.53%	2,586
Marengo	1,243	98.42%	17	1.35%	2	0.16%	1	0.08%	1,226	97.07%	1,263
Marion	1,359	99.05%	0	0.00%	12	0.87%	1	0.07%	1,347	98.18%	1,372
Marshall	2,629	59.31%	1,718	38.75%	81	1.83%	5	0.11%	911	20.55%	4,433
Mobile	4,125	64.91%	1,814	28.54%	380	5.98%	36	0.57%	2,311	36.37%	6,355
Monroe	1,155	96.09%	22	1.83%	22	1.83%	3	0.25%	1,133	94.26%	1,202
Montgomery	4,422	87.70%	233	4.62%	375	7.44%	12	0.24%	4,047	80.27%	5,042
Morgan	2,247	71.58%	519	16.53%	352	11.21%	21	0.67%	1,728	55.05%	3,139
Perry	928	96.17%	25	2.59%	12	1.24%	0	0.00%	903	93.58%	965
Pickens	1,045	87.45%	132	11.05%	15	1.26%	3	0.25%	913	76.40%	1,195
Pike	1,832	97.34%	30	1.59%	15	0.80%	5	0.27%	1,802	95.75%	1,882
Randolph	1,307	65.32%	669	33.43%	18	0.90%	7	0.35%	638	31.88%	2,001
Russell	474	91.33%	14	2.70%	31	5.97%	0	0.00%	443	85.36%	519
St. Clair	1,281	45.30%	1,432	50.64%	110	3.89%	5	0.18%	-151	-5.34%	2,828
Shelby	1,882	49.18%	1,753	45.81%	186	4.86%	6	0.16%	129	3.37%	3,827
Sumter	837	94.68%	28	3.17%	19	2.15%	0	0.00%	809	91.52%	884
Talladega	1,730	71.72%	628	26.04%	48	1.99%	6	0.25%	1,102	45.69%	2,412
Tallapoosa	1,713	99.59%	1	0.06%	3	0.17%	3	0.17%	1,710	99.42%	1,720
Tuscaloosa	2,363	85.80%	247	8.97%	128	4.65%	16	0.58%	2,116	76.83%	2,754
Walker	3,351	54.59%	2,446	39.85%	332	5.41%	9	0.15%	905	14.74%	6,138
Washington	610	89.97%	55	8.11%	12	1.77%	1	0.15%	555	81.86%	678
Wilcox	938	97.81%	6	0.63%	15	1.56%	0	0.00%	923	96.25%	959
Winston	650	36.19%	1,096	61.02%	45	2.51%	5	0.28%	-446	-24.83%	1,796
Totals	113,138	68.76%	42,801	26.01%	8,040	4.89%	562	0.34%	70,337	42.75%	164,541

== See also ==
- United States presidential elections in Alabama
