= Tumbleton, Alabama =

Unincorporated community in Alabama, United States

- Unincorporated community
- Location within Alabama Location within the United States
- Coordinates: 31°24′24″N 85°15′24″W
- Country: United States
- State: Alabama
- County: Henry
- Elevation: 361 ft (110 m)
- Time zone: UTC-6 (Central (CST))
  - Summer (DST): UTC-5 (CDT)
- Area code: 334
- GNIS feature ID: 128120

Tumbleton is an unincorporated community in Henry County, Alabama, United States.

== History ==
The origin of the name Tumbleton came from a lot of tumbling that went on in the large sand-bed under a huge post oak tree by traveling salesmen, drunks, school children, and from Tumble Bugs rolling horse manure. The very first name was Shelley's Sluice, due to all of the sand gathered at the crossroads by rain water drainage; next it was called Shelley's Crossroads, due to the Shelley families who owned the land, next it was being called Shelley Town. The first merchant, Will Taylor, a Shelley in-law, began calling the place Tumble Town due to all of the tumbling activities; later urbanizing the name to Tumbleton. The place once had 1,000 people in the Tumbleton Jr. High School District in the late 1920s. In 2019, Tumbleton is primarily a residential community with a polling place, the Shelley's Garage, which turned 100 years old in 2020, a peanut buying and shelling business, and a demolition business. Tumbleton is situated in some of the best peanut, cotton, and grain farming areas in Henry County, Alabama. The settlement was founded in the 1890s, at the crossing of two dirt roads. It was formerly home to several stores, a cotton gin, grist mill, saw mill, and school.

The Tumbleton soil series is named after the community.

On April 19, 2020, the town was heavily damaged by an EF2 tornado. One person was killed.
