= 1920 United States presidential election in Alabama =

- November 2, 1920

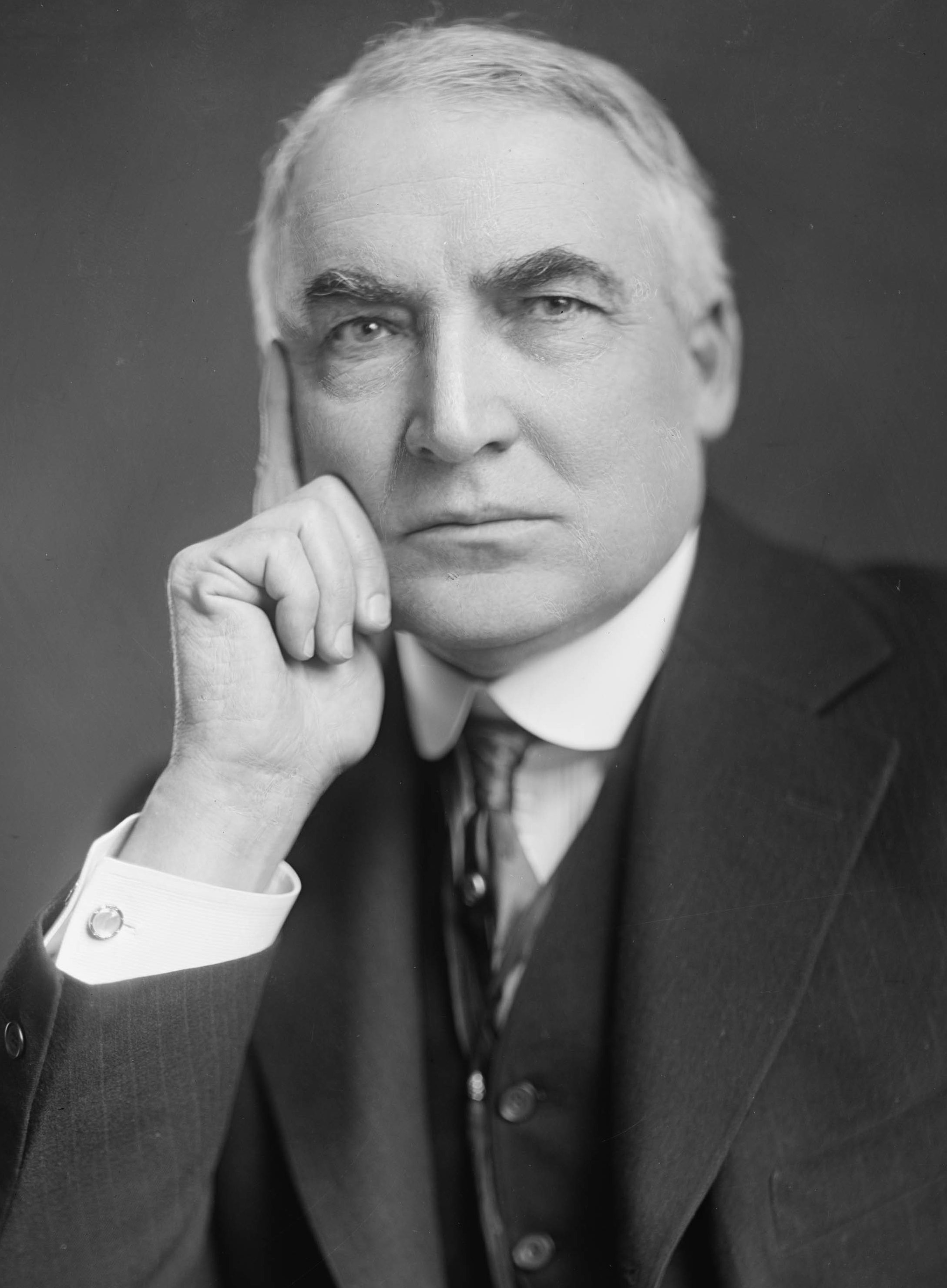
| Nominee | James M. Cox | Warren G. Harding |
| Party | Democratic | Republican |
| Home state | Ohio | Ohio |
| Running mate | Franklin D. Roosevelt | Calvin Coolidge |
| Electoral vote | 12 | 0 |
| Popular vote | 160,560 (Note: The county data used sum to 156,064, suggesting some votes not allocated by county.) | 96,589 (Note: The county data used sum to 74,719, suggesting some votes not allocated by county.) |
| Percentage | 61.68% | 37.11% |
County results
Cox
50–60%
60–70%
70–80%
80–90%
90–100%
Harding
50–60%
60–70%
President before election
Woodrow Wilson
Democratic
Elected President
Warren G. Harding
Republican

The 1920 United States presidential election in Alabama took place on November 2, 1920, as part of the 1920 general election, in which all 48 states participated. Alabama voters chose twelve electors to represent them in the Electoral College via popular vote pitting Democratic nominee James M. Cox and his running mate, Assistant Secretary of the Navy Franklin Roosevelt, against Republican challenger U.S. Senator Warren G. Harding and his running mate, Governor Calvin Coolidge.

Since the 1890s, Alabama had been effectively a one-party state ruled by the Democratic Party. Disenfranchisement of almost all African-Americans and a large proportion of poor whites via poll taxes, literacy tests and extralegal violence had essentially eliminated opposition parties outside of Unionist Winston County and a few nearby northern hill counties that had been Populist strongholds. The only competitive statewide elections became Democratic Party primaries that were limited by law to white voters.

Unlike the other Deep South states, however, soon after black disenfranchisement Alabama's white Republicans made rapid efforts to expel blacks from the state Republican Party. For the 1904 Convention, President Theodore Roosevelt rejected this proposal, unlike in North Carolina where he acquiesced without opposition to the demands of Jeter Connelly Pritchard. Nevertheless, under Oscar D. Street, who ironically was appointed state party boss as part of the pro-Taft “black and tan” faction in 1912, the state GOP would turn completely “lily-white”, with 1920 seeing the final black delegates at any Republican National Convention.

After having doubled their representation in the state legislature from three to six in 1918 the now lily-white Alabama Republican Party would make substantial efforts to break the stranglehold of the Democrats in state politics. Isolationism in Appalachian North Alabama would substantially affect this election, as the passage of the Nineteenth Amendment, opposition to outgoing President Woodrow Wilson’s interventionism in Europe, and major labor disputes in coal mining that were unresolved at the time of the election and would affect the results of Democratic nominee James M. Cox and other Democrats in the less partisan north.

The result of this was that the Republican candidates Ohio Senator Warren G. Harding and Massachusetts Governor Calvin Coolidge were able to make substantial gains, although Cox and running mate Franklin D. Roosevelt still won the election in Alabama with over 61 percent of the vote. Nonetheless, Harding managed to carry nine counties as against only Union holdout Winston County, Populist stronghold Chilton County and urbanized Shelby County carried by Hughes in 1916, with his most pronounced triumph being in DeKalb County, where he was the first Republican to win since the 1872 presidential election. Despite wants to make seat inroads not coming into fruition, the Republicans used Appalachian isolationism and the call for "return to normalcy" to come within ten percent of winning the 4th, 7th and 10th congressional districts.

== Results ==
1920 United States presidential election in Alabama (Note: Sources for the total state and county votes vary. All figures are for the highest elector for each slate.)
| Party | Candidate | Running mate | Votes | Percentage | Electoral votes |
|---|---|---|---|---|---|
| Democratic | James M. Cox | Franklin D. Roosevelt | 160,560 | 61.68% | 12 |
| Republican | Warren G. Harding | Calvin Coolidge | 96,589 | 37.11% | 0 |
| Socialist | Eugene V. Debs | Seymour Stedman | 2,369 | 1.00% | 0 |
| Prohibition | Aaron S. Watkins | D. Leigh Colvin | 748 | 0.32% | 0 |
| Totals | | | 260,266 | 100.00% | 12 |
| Voter turnout (voting age) | | | 20.3% | | |

=== Results by county ===
| County | James M. Cox Democratic | | Warren G. Harding Republican | | Eugene V. Debs Socialist | | Aaron S. Watkins Prohibition | | Margin | | Total votes cast |
| County | # | % | # | % | # | % | # | % | # | % | Total votes cast |
|---|---|---|---|---|---|---|---|---|---|---|---|
| Autauga | 918 | 80.60% | 210 | 18.44% | 7 | 0.61% | 4 | 0.35% | 708 | 62.16% | 1,139 |
| Baldwin | 1,230 | 63.50% | 556 | 28.70% | 134 | 6.92% | 17 | 0.88% | 674 | 34.80% | 1,937 |
| Barbour | 1,568 | 87.79% | 203 | 11.37% | 13 | 0.73% | 2 | 0.11% | 1,365 | 76.43% | 1,786 |
| Bibb | 1,643 | 76.49% | 364 | 16.95% | 136 | 6.33% | 5 | 0.23% | 1,279 | 59.54% | 2,148 |
| Blount | 3,535 | 50.14% | 3,465 | 49.15% | 45 | 0.64% | 5 | 0.07% | 70 | 0.99% | 7,050 |
| Bullock | 877 | 99.66% | 2 | 0.23% | 0 | 0.00% | 1 | 0.11% | 875 | 99.43% | 880 |
| Butler | 1,299 | 88.31% | 153 | 10.40% | 12 | 0.82% | 7 | 0.48% | 1,146 | 77.91% | 1,471 |
| Calhoun | 3,423 | 74.40% | 1,139 | 24.76% | 22 | 0.48% | 17 | 0.37% | 2,284 | 49.64% | 4,601 |
| Chambers | 1,994 | 85.58% | 322 | 13.82% | 8 | 0.34% | 6 | 0.26% | 1,672 | 71.76% | 2,330 |
| Cherokee | 1,969 | 54.65% | 1,576 | 43.74% | 58 | 1.61% | 0 | 0.00% | 393 | 10.91% | 3,603 |
| Chilton | 962 | 29.25% | 2,273 | 69.11% | 48 | 1.46% | 6 | 0.18% | -1,311 | -39.86% | 3,289 |
| Choctaw | 1,071 | 92.65% | 82 | 7.09% | 3 | 0.26% | 0 | 0.00% | 989 | 85.55% | 1,156 |
| Clarke | 1,253 | 96.24% | 43 | 3.30% | 1 | 0.08% | 5 | 0.38% | 1,210 | 92.93% | 1,302 |
| Clay | 2,165 | 50.34% | 2,133 | 49.59% | 2 | 0.05% | 1 | 0.02% | 32 | 0.74% | 4,301 |
| Cleburne | 684 | 41.28% | 971 | 58.60% | 2 | 0.12% | 0 | 0.00% | -287 | -17.32% | 1,657 |
| Coffee | 1,721 | 71.47% | 673 | 27.95% | 4 | 0.17% | 10 | 0.42% | 1,048 | 43.52% | 2,408 |
| Colbert | 1,869 | 72.41% | 650 | 25.18% | 62 | 2.40% | 0 | 0.00% | 1,219 | 47.23% | 2,581 |
| Conecuh | 1,315 | 87.43% | 189 | 12.57% | 0 | 0.00% | 0 | 0.00% | 1,126 | 74.87% | 1,504 |
| Coosa | 1,007 | 57.09% | 741 | 42.01% | 14 | 0.79% | 2 | 0.11% | 266 | 15.08% | 1,764 |
| Covington | 2,039 | 76.83% | 548 | 20.65% | 64 | 2.41% | 3 | 0.11% | 1,491 | 56.18% | 2,654 |
| Crenshaw | 1,411 | 81.61% | 310 | 17.93% | 4 | 0.23% | 4 | 0.23% | 1,101 | 63.68% | 1,729 |
| Cullman | 2,566 | 42.06% | 3,492 | 57.24% | 37 | 0.61% | 6 | 0.10% | -926 | -15.18% | 6,101 |
| Dale | 1,386 | 63.72% | 768 | 35.31% | 5 | 0.23% | 16 | 0.74% | 618 | 28.41% | 2,175 |
| Dallas | 2,702 | 97.19% | 78 | 2.81% | 0 | 0.00% | 0 | 0.00% | 2,624 | 94.39% | 2,780 |
| DeKalb | 3,894 | 44.28% | 4,852 | 55.17% | 46 | 0.52% | 3 | 0.03% | -958 | -10.89% | 8,795 |
| Elmore | 1,762 | 83.07% | 353 | 16.64% | 2 | 0.09% | 4 | 0.19% | 1,409 | 66.43% | 2,121 |
| Escambia | 1,455 | 88.88% | 178 | 10.87% | 2 | 0.12% | 2 | 0.12% | 1,277 | 78.01% | 1,637 |
| Etowah | 5,917 | 64.05% | 3,218 | 34.83% | 100 | 1.08% | 3 | 0.03% | 2,699 | 29.22% | 9,238 |
| Fayette | 1,413 | 42.70% | 1,865 | 56.36% | 15 | 0.45% | 16 | 0.48% | -452 | -13.66% | 3,309 |
| Franklin | 2,094 | 41.15% | 2,930 | 57.58% | 64 | 1.26% | 1 | 0.02% | -836 | -16.43% | 5,089 |
| Geneva | 1,488 | 56.97% | 1,088 | 41.65% | 24 | 0.92% | 12 | 0.46% | 400 | 15.31% | 2,612 |
| Greene | 520 | 97.93% | 10 | 1.88% | 0 | 0.00% | 1 | 0.19% | 510 | 96.05% | 531 |
| Hale | 953 | 97.74% | 18 | 1.85% | 0 | 0.00% | 4 | 0.41% | 935 | 95.90% | 975 |
| Henry | 715 | 59.34% | 489 | 40.58% | 1 | 0.08% | 0 | 0.00% | 226 | 18.76% | 1,205 |
| Houston | 2,045 | 77.00% | 571 | 21.50% | 31 | 1.17% | 9 | 0.34% | 1,474 | 55.50% | 2,656 |
| Jackson | 2,513 | 62.62% | 1,483 | 36.95% | 9 | 0.22% | 8 | 0.20% | 1,030 | 25.67% | 4,013 |
| Jefferson | 24,982 | 75.84% | 7,124 | 21.63% | 555 | 1.68% | 278 | 0.84% | 17,858 | 54.22% | 32,939 |
| Lamar | 1,628 | 73.33% | 576 | 25.95% | 6 | 0.27% | 10 | 0.45% | 1,052 | 47.39% | 2,220 |
| Lauderdale | 2,644 | 68.32% | 1,164 | 30.08% | 56 | 1.45% | 6 | 0.16% | 1,480 | 38.24% | 3,870 |
| Lawrence | 935 | 52.47% | 831 | 46.63% | 10 | 0.56% | 6 | 0.34% | 104 | 5.84% | 1,782 |
| Lee | 1,620 | 85.58% | 155 | 8.19% | 111 | 5.86% | 7 | 0.37% | 1,465 | 77.39% | 1,893 |
| Limestone | 1,812 | 85.71% | 285 | 13.48% | 14 | 0.66% | 3 | 0.14% | 1,527 | 72.23% | 2,114 |
| Lowndes | 727 | 99.18% | 6 | 0.82% | 0 | 0.00% | 0 | 0.00% | 721 | 98.36% | 733 |
| Macon | 693 | 91.30% | 64 | 8.43% | 2 | 0.26% | 0 | 0.00% | 629 | 82.87% | 759 |
| Madison | 2,822 | 84.49% | 489 | 14.64% | 24 | 0.72% | 5 | 0.15% | 2,333 | 69.85% | 3,340 |
| Marengo | 1,370 | 97.03% | 42 | 2.97% | 0 | 0.00% | 0 | 0.00% | 1,328 | 94.05% | 1,412 |
| Marion | 2,461 | 56.85% | 1,865 | 43.08% | 3 | 0.07% | 0 | 0.00% | 596 | 13.77% | 4,329 |
| Marshall | 4,041 | 50.78% | 3,879 | 48.74% | 36 | 0.45% | 2 | 0.03% | 162 | 2.04% | 7,958 |
| Mobile | 6,171 | 68.39% | 2,681 | 29.71% | 133 | 1.47% | 38 | 0.42% | 3,490 | 38.68% | 9,023 |
| Monroe | 1,295 | 97.52% | 20 | 1.51% | 6 | 0.45% | 7 | 0.53% | 1,275 | 96.01% | 1,328 |
| Montgomery | 6,411 | 94.63% | 314 | 4.63% | 32 | 0.47% | 18 | 0.27% | 6,097 | 89.99% | 6,775 |
| Morgan | 4,057 | 76.13% | 1,201 | 22.54% | 50 | 0.94% | 21 | 0.39% | 2,856 | 53.59% | 5,329 |
| Perry | 1,195 | 96.14% | 34 | 2.74% | 13 | 1.05% | 1 | 0.08% | 1,161 | 93.40% | 1,243 |
| Pickens | 1,419 | 83.37% | 263 | 15.45% | 17 | 1.00% | 3 | 0.18% | 1,156 | 67.92% | 1,702 |
| Pike | 1,586 | 88.01% | 204 | 11.32% | 3 | 0.17% | 9 | 0.50% | 1,382 | 76.69% | 1,802 |
| Randolph | 1,357 | 54.74% | 1,113 | 44.90% | 8 | 0.32% | 1 | 0.04% | 244 | 9.84% | 2,479 |
| Russell | 671 | 89.71% | 29 | 3.88% | 45 | 6.02% | 3 | 0.40% | 626 (Note: In this county where Debs ran second ahead of Harding, margin given is Cox vote minus Debs vote and percentage margin Cox percentage minus Debs percentage.) | 83.69% | 748 |
| St. Clair | 1,934 | 41.56% | 2,561 | 55.04% | 47 | 1.01% | 111 | 2.39% | -627 | -13.48% | 4,653 |
| Shelby | 2,523 | 43.64% | 3,235 | 55.95% | 13 | 0.22% | 11 | 0.19% | -712 | -12.31% | 5,782 |
| Sumter | 1,088 | 98.37% | 15 | 1.36% | 3 | 0.27% | 0 | 0.00% | 1,073 | 97.02% | 1,106 |
| Talladega | 2,137 | 69.18% | 931 | 30.14% | 11 | 0.36% | 10 | 0.32% | 1,206 | 39.04% | 3,089 |
| Tallapoosa | 2,257 | 88.44% | 269 | 10.54% | 24 | 0.94% | 2 | 0.08% | 1,988 | 77.90% | 2,552 |
| Tuscaloosa | 3,438 | 86.91% | 491 | 12.41% | 16 | 0.40% | 11 | 0.28% | 2,947 | 74.49% | 3,956 |
| Walker | 4,703 | 50.04% | 4,488 | 47.75% | 186 | 1.98% | 22 | 0.23% | 215 | 2.29% | 9,399 |
| Washington | 575 | 86.73% | 85 | 12.82% | 3 | 0.45% | 0 | 0.00% | 490 | 73.91% | 663 |
| Wilcox | 1,099 | 99.73% | 2 | 0.18% | 0 | 0.00% | 1 | 0.09% | 1,097 | 99.55% | 1,102 |
| Winston | 1,037 | 31.01% | 2,307 | 68.99% | 0 | 0.00% | 0 | 0.00% | -1,270 | -37.98% | 3,344 |
| Totals | 160,560 | 61.68% | 96,589 | 37.11% | 2,402 | 0.92% | 756 | 0.29% | 63,971 | 24.58% | 260,307 |

== See also ==
- United States presidential elections in Alabama
