= Henry County, Alabama =

County in Alabama, United States

- County
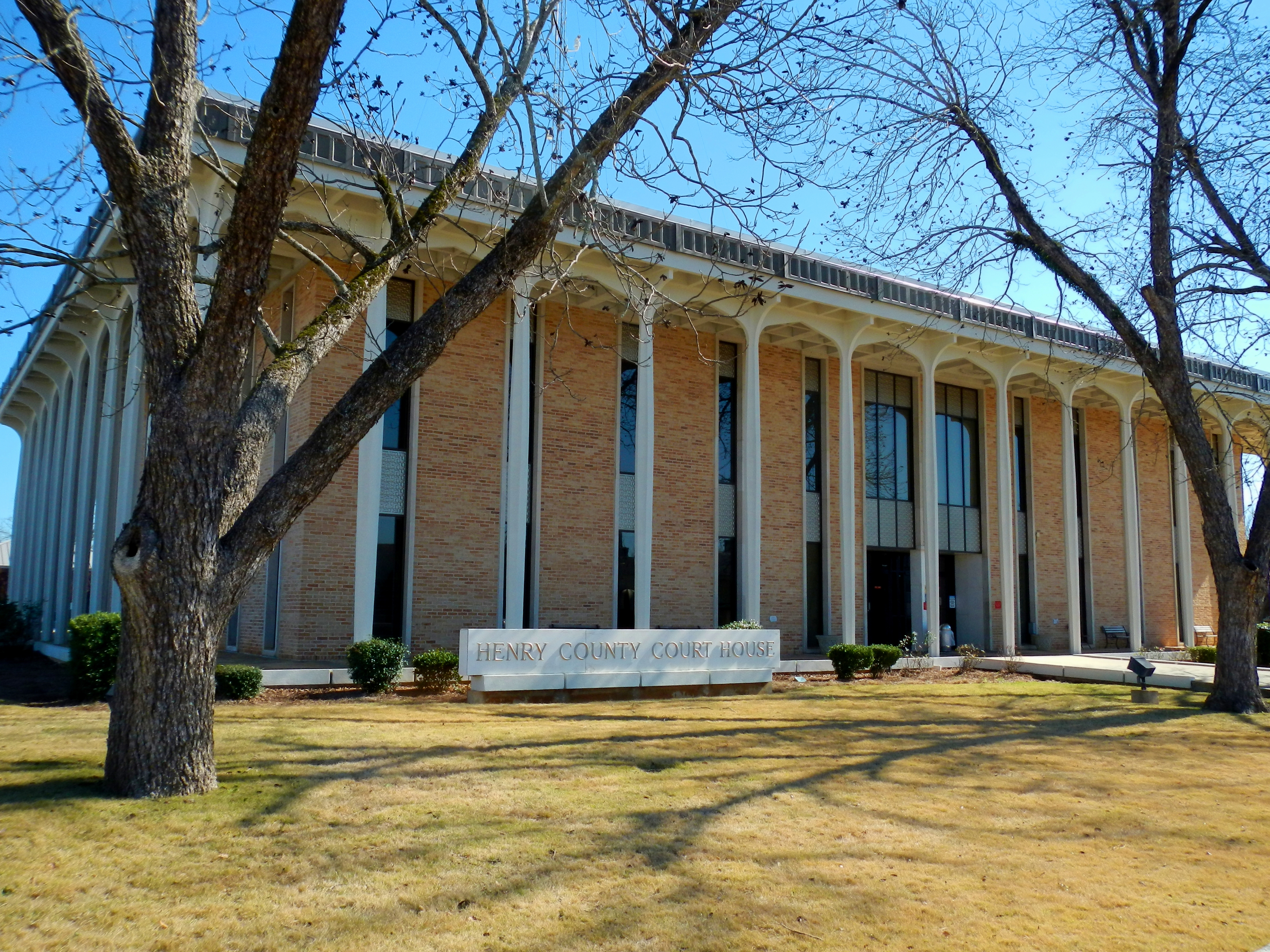
- Henry County Courthouse in Abbeville

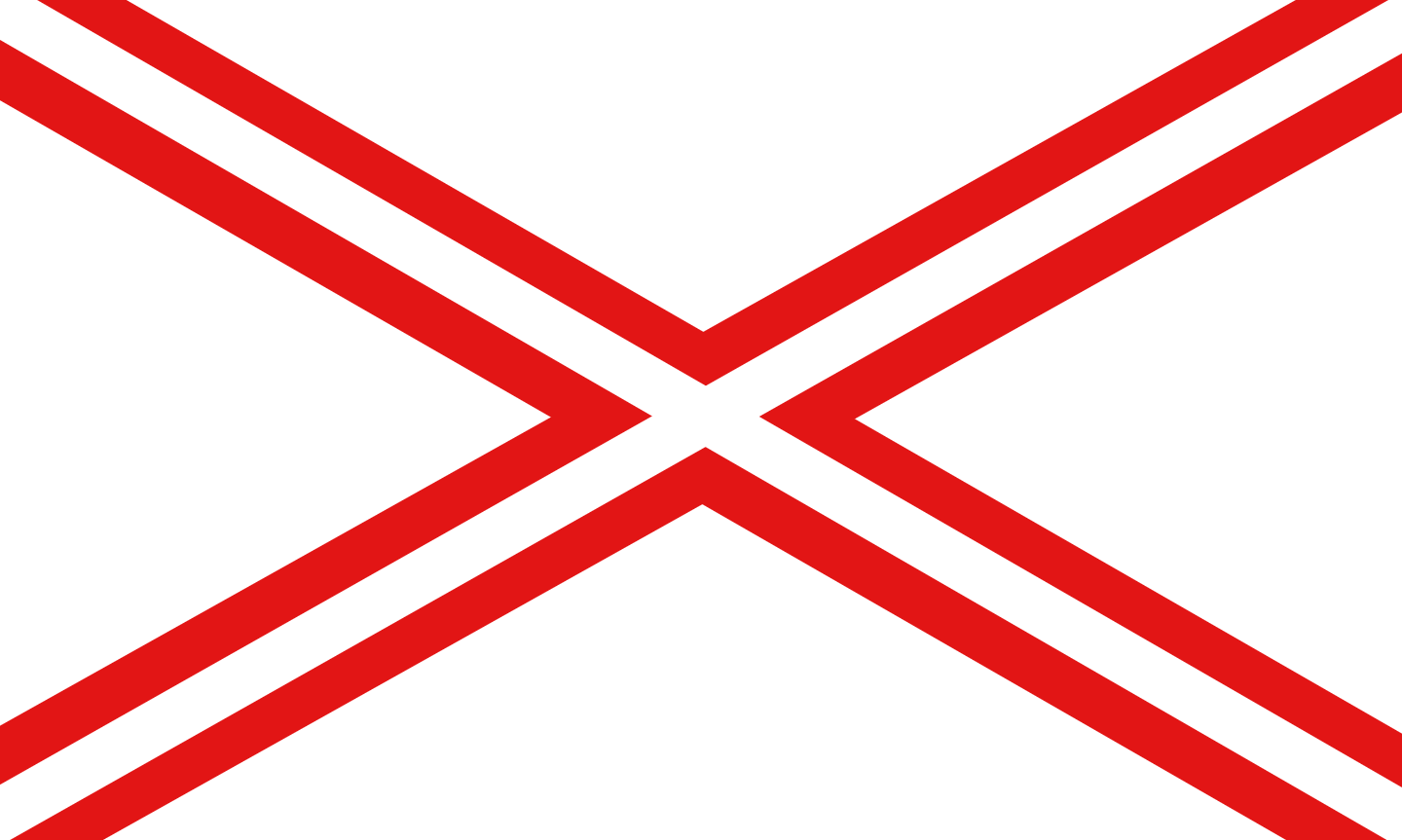
- Flag Seal

- Location within the U.S. state of Alabama
- Coordinates: 31°30′46″N 85°14′04″W
- Country: United States
- State: Alabama
- Founded: December 13, 1819
- Named for: Patrick Henry
- Seat: Abbeville
- Largest city: Headland

Area
  - Total: 568 sq mi (1,470 km^{2})
  - Land: 562 sq mi (1,460 km^{2})
  - Water: 6.6 sq mi (17 km^{2}) 1.2%

Population (2020)
  - Total: 17,146
  - Estimate (2025): 18,394 ▲
  - Density: 30.5/sq mi (11.8/km^{2})
- Time zone: UTC−6 (Central)
  - Summer (DST): UTC−5 (CDT)
- Congressional district: 1st
- Website: www.henrycountyal.com
- County Number 37 on Alabama Licence Plates

Henry County is a county in the southeastern part of the U.S. state of Alabama. As of the 2020 census, its population was 17,146. Its county seat is Abbeville. The county was named for Patrick Henry, the 18th century Governor of Virginia.

Henry County is part of the Dothan, Alabama metropolitan area.

== History ==
The area that includes Henry County had historically been occupied by people of the Lower Creek Confederacy, who now prefer to be known as the Muscogee. It was occupied for thousands of years before that by varying cultures of indigenous peoples who settled primarily along the waterways.

This area was colonized by various European powers, including France and Spain. After Great Britain defeated France in the Seven Years' War, it took over this area. Between 1763 and 1783, the area that is now Henry County, Alabama was under the jurisdiction of the colony of British West Florida. The United States acquired it from Britain after gaining independence in the American Revolutionary War.

After 1814, the territorial settlers developed Franklin as the first European-American settlement in Muscogee/Creek territory. The former river port served Abbeville on the Chattahoochee River. Much of Henry County was within the Alabama wiregrass region.

Henry County was established on December 13, 1819, by the Alabama Territorial Legislature. The area was ceded by the Creek Indian Nation in 1814 under the Treaty of Fort Jackson. Henry County was formed before Alabama was organized as a state. Abbeville was designated as the county seat in 1833.

When the county was formed December 1819, it was the largest county by area within Alabama and encompassed a vast land area that now includes the Southeast Alabama Wiregrass Region and beyond. As population increased in the region, areas of it were taken to organize the present counties of Barbour, Coffee, Covington, Crenshaw, Dale, Geneva, Houston, and Pike.

Timeline:

- December 7, 1821 - The first two counties created, in part, from Old Henry were Covington and Pike counties.
- December 29, 1824 - The third county was Dale which was carved, in whole, from Old Henry.
- December 18, 1832 - The fourth county to be created was Barbour County which was formed, in part, from Pike County. When Barbour County was created, Henry County gained a small parcel of land from the White Oak Creek area.
- December 29, 1841 - The fifth county to be created was Coffee County, which was formed in part from Dale County.
- December 6, 1866 - The sixth was Bullock County, which was created with the southern tip of the county indirectly coming from Old Henry.
- December 24, 1866 - The seventh county to be created was Crenshaw County which was formed, in part, from Coffee, Covington and Pike counties.
- December 28, 1868 - The eighth county to be created was Geneva County which was formed, in part, from Henry, Dale and Coffee counties.
- February 9, 1903 - The last county was Houston County; 72% of its land area was carved from Henry. The balance came from Dale and Geneva counties.

After Houston County was formed in 1903, Henry County had become the smallest in geographic area.

This rural county was developed for agriculture, and planters held many slaves. After Reconstruction, conservative Democratic Party whites regained power in the state legislature and passed Jim Crow laws to suppress African Americans. They also used intimidation and violence to discourage voting, as the freedmen allied with the Republican Party, which they credited with achieving their emancipation and granting of the franchise.

From 1877 to 1950, whites lynched 13 African Americans in the county, most in the decades on either side of the turn of the 20th century. Henry County is among the 805 counties where lynchings took place that is memorialized in the new National Memorial for Peace and Justice, which opened in April 2018 in Montgomery, Alabama.

Mechanization and other changes resulted in population losses, especially from 1940 to 1970, as many African Americans left in the Great Migration, seeking to escape the oppression of Jim Crow and gain work in northern, midwestern and western industrial cities.

== Geography ==
According to the United States Census Bureau, the county has a total area of 568 square miles (1,470 km^{2}), of which 562 square miles (1,460 km^{2}) is land and 6.6 square miles (17 km^{2}) (1.2%) is water. The county is located in the Wiregrass region of southeast Alabama.

It is the fourth-smallest county in Alabama by total area.

=== Major highways ===
- U.S. Highway 431 / State Route 1 (unsigned)
- State Route 10
- State Route 27
- State Route 95
- State Route 134
- State Route 173

=== Adjacent counties ===
- Barbour County (north)
- Clay County, Georgia (northeast/EST Border)
- Early County, Georgia (southeast/EST Border)
- Houston County (south)
- Dale County (west)

== Demographics ==
Historical population
Census	Pop.	Note	%±
1820	2,638		—
1830	4,020		52.4%
1840	5,787		44.0%
1850	9,019		55.8%
1860	14,918		65.4%
1870	14,191		−4.9%
1880	18,761		32.2%
1890	24,847		32.4%
1900	36,147		45.5%
1910	20,943		−42.1%
1920	21,547		2.9%
1930	22,820		5.9%
1940	21,912		−4.0%
1950	18,674		−14.8%
1960	15,286		−18.1%
1970	13,254		−13.3%
1980	15,302		15.5%
1990	15,374		0.5%
2000	16,310		6.1%
2010	17,302		6.1%
2020	17,146		−0.9%
2025 (est.)	18,394	▲	7.3%
U.S. Decennial Census; 1790–1960 1900–1990; 1990–2000 2010–2020

=== 2020 census ===
As of the 2020 census, the county had a population of 17,146. The median age was 46.4 years. 20.4% of residents were under the age of 18 and 23.7% of residents were 65 years of age or older. For every 100 females there were 93.7 males, and for every 100 females age 18 and over there were 90.2 males age 18 and over.

The racial makeup of the county was 69.3% White, 24.8% Black or African American, 0.3% American Indian and Alaska Native, 0.4% Asian, 0.0% Native Hawaiian and Pacific Islander, 1.2% from some other race, and 4.0% from two or more races. Hispanic or Latino residents of any race comprised 1.9% of the population.

0.0% of residents lived in urban areas, while 100.0% lived in rural areas.

There were 7,169 households in the county, of which 27.5% had children under the age of 18 living with them and 29.2% had a female householder with no spouse or partner present. About 28.9% of all households were made up of individuals and 14.7% had someone living alone who was 65 years of age or older.

There were 9,058 housing units, of which 20.9% were vacant. Among occupied housing units, 78.3% were owner-occupied and 21.7% were renter-occupied. The homeowner vacancy rate was 3.0% and the rental vacancy rate was 7.9%.

=== Racial and ethnic composition ===
Henry County, Alabama – Racial and ethnic composition Note: the US Census treats Hispanic/Latino as an ethnic category. This table excludes Latinos from the racial categories and assigns them to a separate category. Hispanics/Latinos may be of any race.
Race / Ethnicity (NH = Non-Hispanic)	Pop 2000	Pop 2010	Pop 2020	% 2000	% 2010	% 2020
White alone (NH)	10,647	11,731	11,842	65.28%	67.80%	69.07%
Black or African American alone (NH)	5,247	4,915	4,232	32.17%	28.41%	24.68%
Native American or Alaska Native alone (NH)	33	54	50	0.20%	0.31%	0.29%
Asian alone (NH)	10	45	73	0.06%	0.26%	0.43%
Pacific Islander alone (NH)	1	2	0	0.01%	0.01%	0.00%
Other race alone (NH)	4	5	49	0.02%	0.03%	0.29%
Mixed race or Multiracial (NH)	119	161	566	0.73%	0.93%	3.30%
Hispanic or Latino (any race)	249	389	334	1.53%	2.25%	1.95%
Total	16,310	17,302	17,146	100.00%	100.00%	100.00%

=== 2010 census ===
As of the census of 2010, there were 17,302 people, 6,994 households, and 4,975 families living in the county. The population density was 31 people per square mile (12 people/km^{2}). There were 8,891 housing units at an average density of 15.6 units per square mile (6.0 units/km^{2}). The racial makeup of the county was 68.6% White, 28.6% Black or African American, 0.3% Native American, 0.3% Asian, 0.0% Pacific Islander, 1.2% from other races, and 1.0% from two or more races. Nearly 2.2% of the population were Hispanic or Latino of any race.

Of the 6,994 households 25.9% had children under the age of 18 living with them, 51.9% were married couples living together, 14.6% had a female householder with no husband present, and 28.9% were non-families. Nearly 25.9% of households were made up of individuals, and 11.8% were one person aged 65 or older. The average household size was 2.45, and the average family size was 2.92.

The age distribution was 22.6% under the age of 18, 6.9% from 18 to 24, 23.1% from 25 to 44, 29.7% from 45 to 64, and 17.6% 65 or older. The median age was 42.8 years. For every 100 females, there were 92.2 males. For every 100 females age 18 and over, there were 93.1 males.

The median household income was $38,379 and the median family income was $46,976. Males had a median income of $37,276 versus $26,771 for females. The per capita income for the county was $19,716. About 15.0% of families and 15.1% of the population were below the poverty line, including 19.7% of those under age 18 and 15.4% of those age 65 or over.

=== 2000 census ===
As of the census of 2000, there were 16,310 people, 6,525 households, and 4,730 families living in the county. The population density was 29 people per square mile (11 people/km^{2}). There were 8,037 housing units at an average density of 14 units per square mile (5.4 units/km^{2}). The racial makeup of the county was 65.67% White, 32.30% Black or African American, 0.21% Native American, 0.06% Asian, 0.02% Pacific Islander, 1.00% from other races, and 0.74% from two or more races. Nearly 1.53% of the population were Hispanic or Latino of any race.

Of the 6,525 households 30.50% had children under the age of 18 living with them, 53.90% were married couples living together, 14.70% had a female householder with no husband present, and 27.50% were non-families. Nearly 25.30% of households were made up of individuals, and 12.30% were one person aged 65 or older. The average household size was 2.47, and the average family size was 2.95.

The age distribution was 24.10% under the age of 18, 8.40% from 18 to 24, 25.70% from 25 to 44, 25.50% from 45 to 64, and 16.40% 65 or older. The median age was 39 years. For every 100 females, there were 90.60 males. For every 100 females age 18 and over, there were 86.20 males.

The median household income was $30,353 and the median family income was $36,555. Males had a median income of $29,189 versus $20,827 for females. The per capita income for the county was $15,681. About 14.50% of families and 19.10% of the population were below the poverty line, including 27.00% of those under age 18 and 20.60% of those age 65 or over.

== Government ==
Henry County is a predominately Republican county. The last Democratic presidential candidate to carry the county was favorite son Jimmy Carter of Georgia in 1980. Bill Clinton came within 63 votes of carrying the county in 1996. The electorate has become more polarized in recent times, with Joe Biden winning less than thirty percent in 2020.

Rural conservative whites had left the Democratic Party following its support of civil rights laws and the movement in the 1960s; many disagreed with its socially liberal positions. Through the late 20th century, conservative whites shifted to the Republican Party. The political affiliations are strongly associated with ethnicity, as African Americans favor the Democratic Party but are a minority in the county.

During the long period of African-American disenfranchisement in the 20th century, the conservative whites of Henry continued their well-established tradition of voting for Democratic candidates, and kept it as part of the "Solid South". They did vote for Republicans Warren G. Harding and Herbert Hoover in 1920 and 1928, respectively, giving them more than forty percent of the vote. In 1964, Barry Goldwater was the first Republican candidate to carry the county as whites began to shift their alliances.

In 1968, Henry County voted for the independent candidate, Alabama governor George Wallace, giving Republican Richard Nixon only 1.59 percent of the county's vote.

Henry County elected Democrat Dexter Grimsley to represent it in the Alabama House of Representatives.

United States presidential election results for Henry County, Alabama
Year	Republican		Democratic		Third party(ies)	
Year	No.	%	No.	%	No.	%
1904	104	11.42%	701	76.95%	106	11.64%
1908	79	8.88%	723	81.24%	88	9.89%
1912	47	5.02%	711	75.88%	179	19.10%
1916	141	13.65%	860	83.25%	32	3.10%
1920	489	40.58%	715	59.34%	1	0.08%
1924	179	17.29%	816	78.84%	40	3.86%
1928	796	49.35%	815	50.53%	2	0.12%
1932	42	2.35%	1,741	97.43%	4	0.22%
1936	35	1.78%	1,925	98.06%	3	0.15%
1940	69	3.40%	1,960	96.50%	2	0.10%
1944	46	2.73%	1,635	97.15%	2	0.12%
1948	47	4.32%	0	0.00%	1,041	95.68%
1952	421	17.60%	1,966	82.19%	5	0.21%
1956	429	15.81%	2,127	78.40%	157	5.79%
1960	588	21.67%	2,115	77.93%	11	0.41%
1964	2,896	83.10%	0	0.00%	589	16.90%
1968	84	1.59%	955	18.05%	4,253	80.37%
1972	3,414	79.56%	853	19.88%	24	0.56%
1976	2,052	39.21%	3,144	60.07%	38	0.73%
1980	2,813	47.85%	2,973	50.57%	93	1.58%
1984	3,952	63.34%	2,231	35.76%	56	0.90%
1988	3,613	61.82%	2,206	37.75%	25	0.43%
1992	2,970	45.70%	2,804	43.15%	725	11.16%
1996	3,082	46.44%	3,019	45.49%	536	8.08%
2000	4,054	58.48%	2,782	40.13%	96	1.38%
2004	4,881	66.31%	2,452	33.31%	28	0.38%
2008	5,585	64.58%	3,018	34.90%	45	0.52%
2012	5,628	64.20%	3,083	35.17%	55	0.63%
2016	5,632	69.77%	2,292	28.39%	148	1.83%
2020	6,607	71.06%	2,606	28.03%	85	0.91%
2024	6,989	74.99%	2,263	24.28%	68	0.73%

United States Senate election results for Henry County, Alabama2
Year	Republican		Democratic		Third party(ies)	
Year	No.	%	No.	%	No.	%
2020	6,399	68.95%	2,872	30.95%	9	0.10%

United States Senate election results for Henry County, Alabama3
Year	Republican		Democratic		Third party(ies)	
Year	No.	%	No.	%	No.	%
2022	5,085	75.53%	1,560	23.17%	87	1.29%

Alabama Gubernatorial election results for Henry County
Year	Republican		Democratic		Third party(ies)	
Year	No.	%	No.	%	No.	%
2022	5,102	75.57%	1,490	22.07%	159	2.36%

== Religion ==
Multiple churches were already in the southern area of the county, including Ramah Church, when Houston County split. In 1876, Ramah Primitive Baptist Church opened in that southern part.

== Communities ==
=== Cities ===
- Abbeville (county seat)
- Dothan (partly in Dale County and Houston County)
- Headland

=== Towns ===
- Haleburg
- Newville

=== Unincorporated communities ===
- Balkum
- Browns Crossroad
- Capps
- Edwin
- Graball
- Grandberry Crossroads
- Lawrenceville
- Otho
- Screamer
- Shorterville
- Tumbleton
- Wills Crossroads
- White Oak

== See also ==
- American Brass Superfund site
- National Register of Historic Places listings in Henry County, Alabama
- Properties on the Alabama Register of Landmarks and Heritage in Henry County, Alabama
