= Browns Crossroad, Alabama =

Unincorporated community in Alabama, United States

- Unincorporated community
- Location within Alabama Location within the United States
- Coordinates: 31°25′40″N 85°12′03″W
- Country: United States
- State: Alabama
- County: Henry
- Elevation: 390 ft (120 m)
- Time zone: UTC-6 (Central (CST))
  - Summer (DST): UTC-5 (CDT)
- Area code: 334
- GNIS feature ID: 115014

Browns Crossroad is an unincorporated community in Henry County, Alabama, United States.

== History ==
Browns Crossroad is named after Thomas Brown, an early settler of the area.
