= Joanne Shaw Taylor discography =

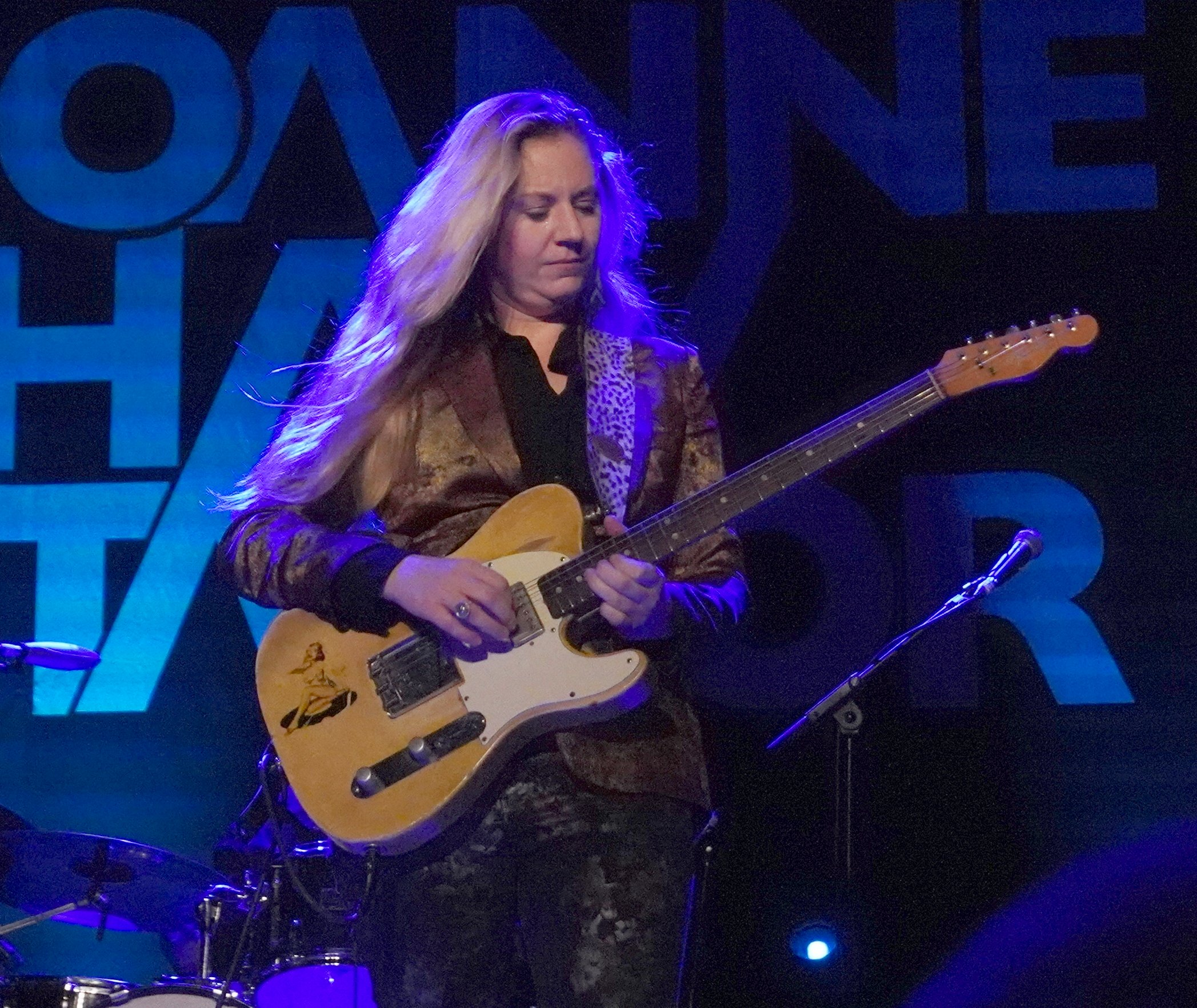
- Taylor performing in 2022.
- Studio albums: 11
- EPs: 2
- Live albums: 2
- Singles: 30
- Video albums: 1
- Music videos: 15

The discography of Joanne Shaw Taylor, a British blues rock musician, consists of eleven studio albums, two live albums, two extended plays (EPs), 30 singles, one video album and 15 music videos. Taylor released her first album White Sugar on Ruf Records in 2009, which reached number 36 on the UK Independent Albums Chart and number 13 on the UK Jazz & Blues Albums Chart. The 2010 follow-up Diamonds in the Dirt charted at numbers 34 and 13, respectively, before 2012's Almost Always Never reached the Independent Albums Chart top 20 and topped the Jazz & Blues Albums Chart. After her first live album Songs from the Road in 2013, Taylor released The Dirty Truth on Axehouse Music, which registered on the main UK Albums Chart for the first time in her career, peaking at number 41. Wild, also on Axehouse, gave the musician her first UK top 20 when it peaked at number 19.

In 2019, Taylor released Reckless Heart as her only album on Silvertone Records, reaching the UK top 20 again and breaking the Scottish Albums Chart top 10 for the first time. After signing with Joe Bonamassa's label Keeping the Blues Alive, Taylor released The Blues Album in 2021, which reached number 56 in the UK and again made it into the Scottish top 10. The guitarist and singer's second live album Blues from the Heart Live followed in 2022, topping the UK Jazz & Blues Albums Chart and reaching the UK Independent Albums Chart top 10. Nobody's Fool, Taylor's eighth studio album, was her first not to register on the UK Albums Chart since Almost Always Never, despite having been at number 44 in the midweek chart update. The album still reached the Independent Albums Chart top 10 and the Jazz & Blues Albums Chart top spot.

== Albums ==
=== Studio albums ===
List of studio albums, with selected chart positions
Title	Album details	Peak chart positions									
Title	Album details	UK	UK Down.	UK Indie	UK J&B	UK Phys.	UK Vinyl	BEL Wal.	GER	SCO	SWI
White Sugar	Released: 23 February 2009; Label: Ruf; Formats: CD, digital	–	–	36	13	–	–	–	–	–	–
Diamonds in the Dirt	Released: 11 October 2010; Label: Ruf; Formats: CD, digital	–	–	34	13	–	–	–	–	–	–
Almost Always Never	Released: 17 September 2012; Label: Ruf; Formats: CD, digital	–	–	20	1	–	–	–	–	–	–
The Dirty Truth	Released: 21 September 2014; Label: Axehouse; Formats: CD, LP, digital	41	–	8	3	25	–	–	–	40	–
Wild	Released: 30 September 2016; Label: Axehouse; Formats: CD, LP, digital	19	35	7	1	13	18	–	–	15	86
Reckless Heart	Released: 15 March 2019; Label: Silvertone/Sony; Formats: CD, LP, digital	20	25	–	1	11	7	–	53	9	31
The Blues Album	Released: 24 September 2021; Label: Keeping the Blues Alive; Formats: CD, LP, digital	56	30	5	1	8	–	195	67	10	20
Nobody's Fool	Released: 28 October 2022; Label: Keeping the Blues Alive; Formats: CD, LP, digital	–	54	8	1	19	33	–	–	25	42
Heavy Soul	Released: 7 June 2024; Label: Keeping the Blues Alive; Formats: CD, LP, digital	–	49	7	2	14	29	–	82	20	53
Black & Gold	Released: 6 June 2025; Label: Keeping the Blues Alive; Formats: CD, LP, digital	–	–	–	–	–	–	–	92	–	95
The Trouble with Love	Released: 23 October 2026; Label: Journeyman; Formats: CD, LP, digital	–	–	–	–	–	–	–	–	10	40
"—" denotes a release that did not chart or was not issued in that region.

=== Live albums ===
List of live albums, with selected chart positions
Title	Album details	Peak chart positions						
Title	Album details	UK Indie	UK Indie Break.	UK J&B	UK Phys.	UK Sales	GER	SCO
Songs from the Road	Released: 5 November 2013; Label: Ruf; Formats: CD, CD+DVD, digital	37	6	5	–	–	–	–
Blues from the Heart Live	Released: 10 June 2022; Label: Keeping the Blues Alive; Formats: CD+DVD, CD+BD, digital	9	–	1	43	46	34	39
"—" denotes a release that did not chart or was not issued in that region.

== Extended plays ==
List of extended plays
Title	EP details
The Dirty Truth Live EP	Released: 2014; Label: Axehouse; Format: CD
Reckless Blues	Released: 6 March 2020; Label: Silvertone; Formats: CD, digital

== Singles ==
List of singles, showing year released and album name
Title	Year	Peak	Album
Title	Year	UK Phys.	Album
"Mud Honey"	2014	–	The Dirty Truth
"Fool in Love"	2014	–	The Dirty Truth
"Wicked Soul"	2015	–	The Dirty Truth
"Feels Like Home" (live with the BBC Big Band)	2015	72	non-album single
"Dyin' to Know"	2016	–	Wild
"Get You Back"	2016	–	Wild
"No Reason to Stay"	2017	–	Wild
"In the Mood"	2018	–	Reckless Heart
"Break My Heart Anyway"	2018	–	Reckless Heart
"Bad Love"	2019	–	Reckless Heart
"The Best Thing"	2019	–	Reckless Heart
"Reckless Heart"	2019	–	Reckless Heart
"If That Ain't a Reason"	2021	–	The Blues Album
"Let Me Down Easy"	2021	–	The Blues Album
"Dyin' to Know" (live)	2022	–	Blues from the Heart Live
"Can't You See What You're Doing to Me" (live)	2022	–	Blues from the Heart Live
"Just No Getting Over You (Dream Cruise)"	2022	–	Nobody's Fool
"Fade Away"	2022	–	Nobody's Fool
"Nobody's Fool"	2023	–	Nobody's Fool
"Sweet 'Lil Lies"	2023	–	Heavy Soul
"Black Magic"	2023	–	Heavy Soul
"Wild Love"	2023	–	Heavy Soul
"All the Way from America"	2023	–	Heavy Soul
"A Good Goodbye"	2024	–	Heavy Soul
"Heavy Soul"	2024	–	Heavy Soul
"Someone Like You"	2024	–	Heavy Soul
"Devil in Me"	2024	–	Heavy Soul
"Change of Heart"	2024	–	Heavy Soul
"Wishing Well" (Free cover)	2024	–	non-album single
"Hold of My Heart"	2024	–	TBA
"—" denotes a release that did not chart.

== Videos ==
=== Video albums ===
List of video albums, with selected chart positions
Title	Album details	Peak
Title	Album details	UK
Live at Oran-Mor	Released: 2016; Label: Axehouse; Format: DVD	15

=== Music videos ===
List of music video, showing year released, director(s) and album name
Title	Year	Director(s)	Album	Ref.
"Outlaw Angel"	2015	Ash TV	The Dirty Truth	
"No Reason to Stay"	2017	unknown	Wild	
"If That Ain't a Reason"	2021	Stereophonic Films	The Blues Album	
"Let Me Down Easy"	2021	Stereophonic Films	The Blues Album	
"Three Time Loser"	2021	unknown	The Blues Album	
"Just No Getting Over You (Dream Cruise)"	2022	DeAnn Forbes	Nobody's Fool	
"Fade Away"	2022	DeAnn Forbes	Nobody's Fool	
"Won't Be Fooled Again" (featuring Joe Bonamassa)	2022	Anthony Saladino	Nobody's Fool	
"Sweet 'Lil Lies"	2023	Rob Bondurant	Heavy Soul	
"Black Magic"	2023	Rob Bondurant	Heavy Soul	
"Wild Love"	2023	Rob Bondurant	Heavy Soul	
"All the Way from America"	2023	Rob Bondurant	Heavy Soul	
"A Good Goodbye"	2024	Rob Bondurant	Heavy Soul	
"Heavy Soul"	2024	Rob Bondurant	Heavy Soul	
"Change of Heart"	2024	Rob Bondurant	Heavy Soul	
