= List of United States tornadoes from January to March 2016 =

This is a list of all tornadoes that were confirmed by local offices of the National Weather Service in the United States from January to March 2016. Based on the 1991–2010 average, 35 tornadoes touch down in January, 29 touch down in February and 80 touch down in March. These tornadoes are commonly focused across the Southern United States due to their proximity to the unstable airmass and warm waters of the Gulf of Mexico, as well as California in association with winter storms.

January saw generally scattered activity and was below average with 17 tornadoes. Three sizeable two-day outbreaks occurred in February, the last of which was one of the largest winter tornado outbreaks ever recorded. The month finished significantly above average with 99 tornadoes. March remained devoid of any large outbreaks, but steady activity throughout the month produced a near-average amount of 83 tornadoes.

== United States yearly total ==
Confirmed tornadoes by Enhanced Fujita rating
| EFU | EF0 | EF1 | EF2 | EF3 | EF4 | EF5 | Total |
|---|---|---|---|---|---|---|---|
| 30 | 530 | 311 | 75 | 26 | 2 | 0 | 974 |

== January ==
Confirmed tornadoes by Enhanced Fujita rating
| EFU | EF0 | EF1 | EF2 | EF3 | EF4 | EF5 | Total |
|---|---|---|---|---|---|---|---|
| 0 | 7 | 6 | 4 | 0 | 0 | 0 | 17 |

=== January 6 event ===
List of confirmed tornadoes – Wednesday, January 6, 2016 (Note: All dates are based on the local time zone where the tornado touched down; however, all times are in Coordinated Universal Time for consistency.)
| EF# | Location | County / Parish | State | Start Coord. | Time (UTC) | Path length | Max width | Damage (2016 USD) |
|---|---|---|---|---|---|---|---|---|
| EF0 | N of Hollister | San Benito | CA | 36.9373°N 121.3821°W | 1650–1651 | 0.67 mi (1.08 km) | 20 yd (18 m) | $75,000 |
| EF0 | Two large barns/sheds sustained significant roof damage. A fence and some trees were also damaged. | | | | | | | |

=== January 7 event ===
List of confirmed tornadoes – Thursday, January 7, 2016
| EF# | Location | County / Parish | State | Start Coord. | Time (UTC) | Path length | Max width | Damage (2016 USD) |
|---|---|---|---|---|---|---|---|---|
| EF0 | ENE of Marathon | Monroe | FL | 24.7315°N 81.0139°W | 1130–1131 | 0.09 mi (140 m) | 20 yd (18 m) | $2,000 |
| EF0 | A waterspout moved onshore just north of Key Colony Beach, damaging a metal overhang at a seafood distribution business and tearing/damaging several tarps and coverings on several boats at a marina. | | | | | | | |

=== January 9 event ===
List of confirmed tornadoes – Saturday, January 9, 2016
| EF# | Location | County / Parish | State | Start Coord. | Time (UTC) | Path length | Max width | Damage (2016 USD) |
|---|---|---|---|---|---|---|---|---|
| EF2 | Southern Cape Coral | Lee | FL | 26.57°N 82.037°W | 2345–2352 | 3.35 mi (5.39 km) | 182 yd (166 m) | $2,000,000 |
| EF2 | A strong tornado damaged 178 structures in the southern part of Cape Coral, including 163 homes that sustained minor damage, 14 homes that sustained major damage, and 1 home that was destroyed. More than 100 power poles were downed. Three people were injured. | | | | | | | |

=== January 15 event ===
List of confirmed tornadoes – Friday, January 15, 2016
| EF# | Location | County / Parish | State | Start Coord. | Time (UTC) | Path length | Max width | Damage (2016 USD) |
|---|---|---|---|---|---|---|---|---|
| EF1 | SW of Fort Myers | Lee | FL | 26.5503°N 81.9126°W | 1610–1612 | 0.19 mi (310 m) | 45 yd (41 m) | $200,000 |
| EF1 | Brief tornado damaged four structures in the McGregor area. A pool maintenance building had its roof ripped off and thrown into a nearby structure, and trees were snapped. An apartment building sustained roof, window, and porch damage. | | | | | | | |

=== January 17 event ===
List of confirmed tornadoes – Sunday, January 17, 2016
| EF# | Location | County / Parish | State | Start Coord. | Time (UTC) | Path length | Max width | Damage (2016 USD) |
|---|---|---|---|---|---|---|---|---|
| EF2 | S of Sarasota | Sarasota | FL | 27.253°N 82.5396°W | 0810–0815 | 1.15 mi (1.85 km) | 350 yd (320 m) | $12,000,000 |
| EF2 | Numerous homes and other structures were damaged, with the second floor of one home collapsing on Siesta Key. Two people were injured. | | | | | | | |
| EF2 | W of Duette | Manatee | FL | 27.538°N 82.219°W | 0835–0848 | 9.2 mi (14.8 km) | 300 yd (270 m) | $150,000 |
| EF2 | 2 deaths – A single-wide mobile home was rolled over and destroyed, a 2,000-square-foot (190 m^{2}) barn was destroyed, and trees were downed. The two deaths and an additional four injuries occurred inside the mobile home. | | | | | | | |
| EF1 | NNW of Hobe Sound | Martin | FL | 27.0873°N 80.1497°W | 1213–1215 | 0.8 mi (1.3 km) | 75 yd (69 m) | $100,000 |
| EF1 | Eight homes and four vehicles sustained damage from fallen trees and flying debris. | | | | | | | |

=== January 21 event ===
List of confirmed tornadoes – Thursday, January 21, 2016
| EF# | Location | County / Parish | State | Start Coord. | Time (UTC) | Path length | Max width | Damage (2016 USD) |
|---|---|---|---|---|---|---|---|---|
| EF0 | SE of Crystal Springs | Copiah | MS | 31.9388°N 90.2981°W | 2214–2219 | 3.03 mi (4.88 km) | 50 yd (46 m) | $17,000 |
| EF0 | A weak tornado caused minor roof damage to two homes and snapped several trees. | | | | | | | |
| EF1 | SE of Midway to WNW of Wesson | Lincoln, Copiah | MS | 31.6919°N 90.5363°W | 2225 – 2233 | 5.34 mi (8.59 km) | 200 yd (180 m) | $165,000 |
| EF1 | Two sheds were damaged and two homes sustained roof damage, one of which had a section of roof torn off. Trees were damaged and downed along the path. | | | | | | | |
| EF1 | Pinola | Simpson | MS | 31.8656°N 90.0125°W | 2320–2329 | 3.89 mi (6.26 km) | 300 yd (270 m) | $17,000 |
| EF1 | Two mobile homes sustained roof damage, one of which lost most of its roof. Several trees were snapped as well. | | | | | | | |
| EF0 | NW of Homewood | Scott | MS | 32.2624°N 89.5387°W | 2346–2349 | 2.09 mi (3.36 km) | 75 yd (69 m) | $9,000 |
| EF0 | Several large pine trees were snapped. A few other large limbs were broken off as well. | | | | | | | |
| EF1 | NNW of Tangipahoa | Tangipahoa | LA | 30.8872°N 90.5192°W | 2358–2359 | 0.24 mi (0.39 km) | 50 yd (46 m) | $0 |
| EF1 | A dozen large oak trees were uprooted or had their trunks snapped. | | | | | | | |
| EF2 | SSW of Sumrall | Lamar | MS | 31.3241°N 89.6506°W | 0049–0056 | 6.46 mi (10.40 km) | 530 yd (480 m) | $65,000 |
| EF2 | A frame home had much of its roof blown off, and a garage was destroyed as a result of this low-end EF2 tornado. A mobile home was tipped over and another sustained roof damage. Numerous trees were snapped along the path. | | | | | | | |

=== January 22 event ===
List of confirmed tornadoes – Friday, January 22, 2016
| EF# | Location | County / Parish | State | Start Coord. | Time (UTC) | Path length | Max width | Damage (2016 USD) |
|---|---|---|---|---|---|---|---|---|
| EF0 | ESE of Paxton | Walton | FL | 30.8969°N 86.1972°W | 0744–0749 | 3.03 mi (4.88 km) | 50 yd (46 m) | $0 |
| EF0 | Trees were downed. | | | | | | | |
| EF0 | N of Broad Branch | Calhoun | FL | 30.3563°N 85.3032°W | 0949–0951 | 1.17 mi (1.88 km) | 50 yd (46 m) | $0 |
| EF0 | Trees were downed. | | | | | | | |

=== January 27 event ===
List of confirmed tornadoes – Wednesday, January 27, 2016
| EF# | Location | County / Parish | State | Start Coord. | Time (UTC) | Path length | Max width | Damage (2016 USD) |
|---|---|---|---|---|---|---|---|---|
| EF1 | SE of Coconut Creek | Broward | FL | 26.2349°N 80.1809°W | 1430–1436 | 2.29 mi (3.69 km) | 35 yd (32 m) | $850,000 |
| EF1 | Numerous trees were snapped or uprooted, several cars were tossed, and a bus was flipped. Several condos sustained substantial roof damage, with concrete blocks tossed many yards. Light poles were snapped, a tractor trailer was turned onto its side, and power lines were downed. Two people were injured. | | | | | | | |

=== January 28 event ===
List of confirmed tornadoes – Thursday, January 28, 2016
| EF# | Location | County / Parish | State | Start Coord. | Time (UTC) | Path length | Max width | Damage (2016 USD) |
|---|---|---|---|---|---|---|---|---|
| EF0 | Delray Beach to Ocean Ridge | Palm Beach | FL | 26.4568°N 80.1025°W | 1532–1543 | 7.12 mi (11.46 km) | 10 yd (9.1 m) | Unknown |
| EF0 | A tornado inflicted minor damage to the roof of a home, trees, fencing, and vegetation. A condominium complex sustained minor damage as well. | | | | | | | |

== February ==
Confirmed tornadoes by Enhanced Fujita rating
| EFU | EF0 | EF1 | EF2 | EF3 | EF4 | EF5 | Total |
|---|---|---|---|---|---|---|---|
| 0 | 35 | 49 | 10 | 5 | 0 | 0 | 99 |

=== February 2 event ===
List of confirmed tornadoes – Tuesday, February 2, 2016
| EF# | Location | County / Parish | State | Start Coord. | Time (UTC) | Path length | Max width | Damage (Note: All damage totals are in 2016 USD unless otherwise stated.) | Summary |
|---|---|---|---|---|---|---|---|---|---|
| EF1 | S of Newton to WSW of Hickory | Newton | MS | 32.2441°N 89.1570°W | 2048–2052 | 7.13 mi (11.47 km) | 150 yd (140 m) | $120,000 | Three site-built homes and a mobile home were damaged, two chicken houses were destroyed, and numerous trees and power poles were snapped along the path. |
| EF2 | SW of Collinsville to S of De Kalb | Lauderdale, Kemper | MS | 32.4685°N 88.8749°W | 2119–2149 | 21.23 mi (34.17 km) | 880 yd (800 m) | $1,485,000 | A strong wedge tornado damaged numerous homes and other structures in subdivisions in and around Collinsville, heavily damaged or destroyed a couple mobile homes, and caused extensive damage to buildings at Collinsville Baptist Church. Moving to the northeast, the tornado downed many trees, damaged outbuildings, and caused minor roof and fencing damage at West Lauderdale High School before dissipating in Kemper County. |
| EF2 | ESE of De Kalb to W of Panola, AL | Kemper, Noxubee | MS | 32.7303°N 88.5776°W | 2153–2223 | 18.52 mi (29.81 km) | 300 yd (270 m) | $270,000 | A multiple-vortex tornado impacted the west side of Scooba, downing many trees and power lines and damaging the baseball field, fence, and field-house buildings at East Mississippi Community College, as well as two mobile buildings and the roofs of several homes in the area. Moving away from Scooba, the tornado mowed down groves of trees, completely destroyed a well-constructed barn, a carport, and a metal shed, caused minor roof damage to another home, and damaged several other sheds. More trees were downed as the tornado dissipated near the Noxubee River. |
| EF2 | NNW of Panola to SW of Reform | Pickens | AL | 33.0273°N 88.3177°W | 2234–2309 | 26.2 mi (42.2 km) | 1,200 yd (1,100 m) | $0 | A strong wedge tornado was caught on camera by local media moved north-northeastward through Pickens County, causing minor damage to a building at a campground in Cochrane and to another building at the Aliceville federal prison. Multiple mobile homes and frame homes were heavily damaged or destroyed in the Sapp community northwest of Aliceville and McMullen, and trees blown over onto homes and other structures on the west side of Carrollton. Thousands of trees were snapped and uprooted along the path, and one person was injured. |
| EF1 | W of Alamo | Crockett | TN | 35.7673°N 89.1677°W | 2255–2303 | 2.64 mi (4.25 km) | 100 yd (91 m) | $150,000 | A mobile home, a site-built structure, several houses, and several buildings at Crockett County High School sustained roof damage as a result of this rain-wrapped tornado. Numerous sheds were damaged and many trees were downed, especially at the Crockett County Golf Club. Two tractor-trailers were overturned on US 412. The driver of one of the overturned trucks was injured. |
| EF1 | Shuqualak to SE of Macon | Noxubee | MS | 32.9828°N 88.5732°W | 2327–2336 | 6.59 mi (10.61 km) | 150 yd (140 m) | $170,000 | A large portion of the roof was removed from a gas station in Shuqualak, a 60-foot (18 m) section of the roof was taken off and windows were blown out of an old school building, and many trees were downed. |
| EF1 | SE of Kennedy | Fayette | AL | 33.5399°N 87.9153°W | 2336–2345 | 6.12 mi (9.85 km) | 500 yd (460 m) | $0 | A house sustained minor roof and porch damage, and numerous trees were downed. |
| EF1 | SW of Neshoba | Neshoba | MS | 32.6071°N 89.1547°W | 0039–0041 | 0.68 mi (1.09 km) | 50 yd (46 m) | $22,000 | A house had its tin roof torn off, an outbuilding was destroyed, and several trees were snapped or uprooted. |
| EF1 | SE of Beaverton | Lamar | AL | 33.8779°N 88.0210°W | 0210–0216 | 4.13 mi (6.65 km) | 400 yd (370 m) | $0 | One home sustained major roof damage, another sustained minor roof damage, and many trees were downed. |

=== February 3 event ===
List of confirmed tornadoes – Wednesday, February 3, 2016
| EF# | Location | County / Parish | State | Start Coord. | Time (UTC) | Path length | Max width | Damage | Summary |
|---|---|---|---|---|---|---|---|---|---|
| EF0 | E of Ethelsville | Pickens | AL | 33.3956°N 88.1635°W | 0502–0508 | 4.18 mi (6.73 km) | 1,400 yd (1,300 m) | $0 | A weak wedge tornado downed several trees. |
| EF0 | SW of Lexington | Davidson | NC | 35.7989°N 80.3185°W | 1802–1804 | 1.03 mi (1.66 km) | 50 yd (46 m) | $25,000 | Numerous trees were snapped or uprooted, some of which fell onto and damaged homes and vehicles. Other homes sustained damage to shingles, gutters, and siding. |
| EF1 | NE of Lexington | Davidson | NC | 35.8451°N 80.1522°W | 1814–1816 | 1.67 mi (2.69 km) | 100 yd (91 m) | $100,000 | Numerous trees were snapped or uprooted, some of which fell onto and damaged homes and vehicles. Other homes sustained damage to shingles, gutters, and siding. Six to eight farm outbuildings were severely damaged or destroyed, including a few that had collapsed walls and major loss of roof panels. |
| EF0 | ESE of Pine Ridge | Lexington | SC | 33.9033°N 81.0696°W | 1928–1929 | 0.69 mi (1.11 km) | 75 yd (69 m) | $50,000 | A brief tornado either damaged or destroyed several cars in a storage lot and downed a few trees. |
| EF1 | Fort Stewart | Liberty | GA | 31.8717°N 81.6247°W | 2200–2212 | 5.7 mi (9.2 km) | 300 yd (270 m) | $5,080,000 | A high-end EF1 tornado touched down near Gate 7 on Fort Stewart and moved slowly northeast, causing heavy damage to six to ten homes in one neighborhood, mainly as a result of falling pine trees. However, one home had approximately 75 percent of its poorly-attached roof removed by the tornado itself. Three cars were moved/rolled-over in the parking lot at Diamond Elementary School, and one corner of the gymnasium sustained roof damage. Many trees and several power lines were downed along the path, which totaled damage to approximately 42 homes, 150 to 200 vehicles, and 8 storage unit facilities. |

=== February 15 event ===
List of confirmed tornadoes – Monday, February 15, 2016
| EF# | Location | County / Parish | State | Start Coord. | Time (UTC) | Path length | Max width | Damage (2016 USD) |
|---|---|---|---|---|---|---|---|---|
| EF0 | SE of Plaucheville | Avoyelles | LA | 30.9533°N 91.9219°W | 1622–1623 | 0.32 mi (0.51 km) | 20 yd (18 m) | $10,000 |
| EF0 | Three mobile homes and one brick home sustained minor shingle, awning, and carport damage. A storage building lost one of its walls, a barn had part of its door and wall ripped off, and a small storage shed was thrown 20 yards off of its foundation. Several trees were snapped as well. | | | | | | | |
| EF0 | NNE of Clinton | Hinds | MS | 32.3762°N 90.3166°W | 1700–1701 | 0.52 mi (0.84 km) | 50 yd (46 m) | $3,000 |
| EF0 | A few cedar trees were snapped, a hardwood tree had its top blown off, and large limbs were broken. | | | | | | | |
| EF2 | SW of Wesson to ENE of Pinola | Copiah, Simpson | MS | 31.696°N 90.4023°W | 1810–1857 | 30.34 mi (48.83 km) | 250 yd (230 m) | $960,000 |
| EF2 | A tornado touched down in Wesson and produced EF1 damage in town. Trees and power lines were downed, and Wesson High School and a home sustained roof damage. The tornado exited town and reached high-end EF2 strength in the rural community of Stronghope, where a frame home and a shop building were destroyed, another home had its roof torn off, and a mobile home sustained roof damage. Further east, the tornado weakened to EF1 strength as two homes sustained roof damage. The tornado then entered Simpson County, where there was minor damage to a home and a barn before the tornado dissipated near Pinola. Numerous trees were snapped and uprooted along the path, some of which landed on homes and vehicles. | | | | | | | |
| EF1 | SE of Thomastown | Leake | MS | 32.8155°N 89.6062°W | 1815–1819 | 1.88 mi (3.03 km) | 300 yd (270 m) | $800,000 |
| EF1 | A high-end EF1 tornado flattened three chicken houses, snapped and uprooted numerous trees, and caused minor roof damage to a house. | | | | | | | |
| EF1 | NE of Zama | Winston | MS | 33.0346°N 89.2791°W | 1845–1850 | 2.51 mi (4.04 km) | 200 yd (180 m) | $45,000 |
| EF1 | A tornado snapped or uprooted several trees. | | | | | | | |
| EF0 | SSW of Welsh | Jefferson Davis | LA | 30.1606°N 92.8538°W | 1904–1905 | 0.78 mi (1.26 km) | 10 yd (9.1 m) | $0 |
| EF0 | Law enforcement reported a brief tornado that caused no damage. | | | | | | | |
| EF1 | S of Tylertown | Walthall | MS | 31.0721°N 90.1828°W | 1915–1922 | 5 mi (8.0 km) | 250 yd (230 m) | Unknown |
| EF1 | A manufactured home had its roof blown off and an exterior wall collapsed, injuring two people inside. Another manufactured home sustained minor damage, and many trees and power lines were damaged. | | | | | | | |
| EF0 | NW of Mize | Smith | MS | 31.9468°N 89.6273°W | 1924–1927 | 2.1 mi (3.4 km) | 100 yd (91 m) | $15,000 |
| EF0 | A brief tornado downed a few trees along its path. | | | | | | | |
| EF1 | Sylvarena | Smith | MS | 31.9934°N 89.4087°W | 1943–1947 | 2.72 mi (4.38 km) | 250 yd (230 m) | $250,000 |
| EF1 | Several structures along MS 18 in Sylvarena were damaged, as a gas station's canopy was ripped off and an antenna was blown down. Homes also sustained roof damage and some were damaged by uprooted trees. | | | | | | | |
| EF1 | NE of Sylvarena to SW of Garlandville | Smith, Jasper | MS | 32.0506°N 89.3413°W | 1952–2011 | 14.62 mi (23.53 km) | 350 yd (320 m) | $608,000 |
| EF1 | Several buildings in Montrose were damaged, including a church with roof damage and a few homes that were damaged by falling trees. Trees were snapped or uprooted throughout its path, with a few also falling on homes. | | | | | | | |
| EF3 | NW of McDavid, FL to NW of Pollard, AL | Escambia (FL), Escambia (AL) | FL, AL | 30.8707°N 87.3810°W | 2132–2155 | 16.45 mi (26.47 km) | 300 yd (270 m) | $5,750,000 |
| EF3 | Numerous homes and mobile homes were destroyed or heavily damaged in and around Century as a result of this tornado. A few frame homes were left with only interior rooms standing and one was flattened. A church was shifted off of its foundation and a large metal building sustained major damage as well. A workshop building and several outbuildings were destroyed, and many trees and power poles were snapped along the path. Three people were injured by this tornado. This was the first confirmed EF3+ tornado in the state of Florida since the Groundhog Day tornadoes of February 2, 2007. | | | | | | | |
| EF0 | S of Cecil | Montgomery | AL | 32.2352°N 86.0243°W | 2200–2205 | 2.46 mi (3.96 km) | 75 yd (69 m) | $0 |
| EF0 | A weak tornado removed metal paneling from a barn, destroyed an outbuilding, snapped pine trees, downed tree limbs, and caused minor roof damage to a house. | | | | | | | |
| EF2 | WNW of Brooklyn | Conecuh | AL | 31.2724°N 86.8483°W | 2233–2237 | 2.19 mi (3.52 km) | 250 yd (230 m) | $750,000 |
| EF2 | The Johnsonville Volunteer Fire Department was completely destroyed, a well built home sustained extensive roof damage, and significant tree damage occurred. A few more homes sustained roof damage and an unanchored single wide mobile home was destroyed further along the path as well. | | | | | | | |
| EF1 | N of Red Level | Covington | AL | 31.4574°N 86.6181°W | 2300–2302 | 4.53 mi (7.29 km) | 50 yd (46 m) | $100,000 |
| EF1 | A single wide mobile home was destroyed, where one person suffered a minor injury, a few residences had minor roof damage and sporadic tree damage occurred along the path. | | | | | | | |
| EF1 | S of Brundidge | Pike | AL | 31.6617°N 85.8398°W | 0020–0026 | 4.98 mi (8.01 km) | 400 yd (370 m) | $0 |
| EF1 | A mobile home and a partially covered horse arena were destroyed. A frame home sustained minor roof damage. Many pine trees were snapped along the path, some of which landed on and destroyed a mobile home and also damaged a frame home. | | | | | | | |
| EF1 | SW of Crawford | Russell | AL | 32.4°N 85.3476°W | 0057–0104 | 6.8 mi (10.9 km) | 400 yd (370 m) | $0 |
| EF1 | A large metal shed was lofted over power lines and destroyed, and the debris toppled two power poles. A frame home sustained shingle damage and collapse of a chimney. Many trees were snapped and uprooted along the path. | | | | | | | |
| EF0 | Crawford | Russell, Lee | AL | 32.3952°N 85.2546°W | 0100–0108 | 7.09 mi (11.41 km) | 250 yd (230 m) | $0 |
| EF0 | A tornado caused minor damage in Crawford before crossing into Lee County and dissipating. Homes sustained shingle damage, an outbuilding sustained significant roof damage, and a vacant home was damaging by a falling cedar tree. Numerous trees were snapped or uprooted. | | | | | | | |

=== February 16 event ===
List of confirmed tornadoes – Tuesday, February 16, 2016
| EF# | Location | County / Parish | State | Start Coord. | Time (UTC) | Path length | Max width | Damage (2016 USD) |
|---|---|---|---|---|---|---|---|---|
| EF1 | S of Moore Haven | Glades | FL | 26.8173°N 81.1064°W | 0949–0953 | 1.77 mi (2.85 km) | 75 yd (69 m) | Unknown |
| EF1 | Two mobile homes were destroyed, one of which was flipped and another which had most of its walls removed. A home had its back porch destroyed and its roof damaged, the porch roof of a mobile home was destroyed, and the side of a shed was pierced by debris. Power lines were downed, fences were damaged, a greenhouse and some dog and chicken pens were destroyed, and trees were uprooted. | | | | | | | |
| EF0 | ENE of Miles City | Collier | FL | 26.22°N 81.18°W | 1010–1017 | 4 mi (6.4 km) | 10 yd (9.1 m) | Unknown |
| EF0 | A Florida Highway Patrol officer reported a tornado north of I-75 which tracked to the northeast. | | | | | | | |
| EF0 | Southeastern Weston to Northern Davie | Broward | FL | 26.0747°N 80.3628°W | 1205–1218 | 6.72 mi (10.81 km) | 50 yd (46 m) | Unknown |
| EF0 | Many trees were downed along the path, power lines were downed, and shingle and soffit damage occurred to homes. | | | | | | | |
| EF1 | Pompano Beach to Southern Lighthouse Point | Broward | FL | 26.245°N 80.1289°W | 1210–1216 | 3.04 mi (4.89 km) | 50 yd (46 m) | $100,000 |
| EF1 | A tornado touched down in Pompano Beach, causing severe damage to a home, then struck the north side of the Pompano Beach Airpark, damaging stables and injuring a horse. The tornado then struck the municipal golf course in Pompano Beach, causing tree damage there and at the Pompano Citi Centre. Damage diminished along Federal Highway before reemerging in Lighthouse Point. In that area, the tornado snapped tree branches and overturned trees, with some minor damage to roofs and power lines as well. | | | | | | | |
| EF0 | NE of Port Everglades | Broward | FL | 26.11°N 80.13°W | 1234–1238 | 1.87 mi (3.01 km) | 50 yd (46 m) | Unknown |
| EF0 | A pine tree was snapped at its top, a catamaran and another boat capsized, and dozens of beach chairs along Fort Lauderdale Beach were tossed. | | | | | | | |
| EF1 | Norland to Ojus | Miami-Dade | FL | 25.9553°N 80.2159°W | 1251–1259 | 3.78 mi (6.08 km) | 150 yd (140 m) | Unknown |
| EF1 | A tornado touched down a couple miles east of Sun Life Stadium and produced isolated damage, with evidence suggesting periodic redevelopment of the circulation. West of Interstate 95, the tornado prostrated or splintered many trees, and branches were snapped off. Several light poles were bent over, and one wooden pole was snapped. Damage to homes was minimal, mainly to roofs, and was mostly attributable to uprooted trees and downed branches. An apartment building sustained shingle damage as well. | | | | | | | |
| EF1 | NNE of Davis to WNW of Sea Level | Carteret | NC | 34.8206°N 76.4499°W | 1351–1354 | 4.23 mi (6.81 km) | 167 yd (153 m) | $100,000 |
| EF1 | High-end EF1 tornado downed six power poles and demolished the back of a seafood business. | | | | | | | |

=== February 23 event ===
List of confirmed tornadoes – Tuesday, February 23, 2016
| EF# | Location | County / Parish | State | Start Coord. | Time (UTC) | Path length | Max width | Damage | Summary |
|---|---|---|---|---|---|---|---|---|---|
| EF0 | ESE of Boling-Iago | Wharton | TX | 29.2382°N 95.8865°W | 1153–1157 | 2.02 mi (3.25 km) | 30 yd (27 m) | $0 | A brief, narrow tornado destroyed three sheds and damaged three homes. |
| EF0 | Southwestern Kenner | Jefferson | LA | 29.9757°N 90.2727°W | 1711–1713 | 0.58 mi (0.93 km) | 50 yd (46 m) | Unknown | A weak tornado developed close to the Mississippi River in the southwest part of Kenner, removing roofing shingles from one home. A church's poorly attached brick facade collapsed, and a small shed was destroyed. A nearby utility pole was downed as well. The tornado also destroyed part of another home's roof and damaged a tin awning. Further along the path, an air conditioning unit and a storage structure were damaged. One tree was snapped near the end of the path. |
| EF0 | SW of White Castle | Iberville | LA | 30.1324°N 91.1811°W | 1720–1725 | 3.32 mi (5.34 km) | 50 yd (46 m) | Unknown | Tin roofs were peeled back and power lines were damaged. Tree limbs were broken off as well. |
| EF0 | Prairieville | Ascension | LA | 30.3176°N 90.9804°W | 1808–1813 | 1.61 mi (2.59 km) | 200 yd (180 m) | Unknown | A Gold's Gym had its metal roofing torn off, allowing wind to rush into the building and blow out one of the exterior walls. Several businesses nearby sustained damage to their roofs and siding. Garage doors at a mechanic shop were blown in, and a Popeyes sign was blown over. Homes in town also sustained additional minor damage to outbuildings, roofs, and patios. |
| EF2 | Western Livingston | Livingston | LA | 30.496°N 90.7592°W | 1842–1851 | 4.33 mi (6.97 km) | 625 yd (572 m) | Unknown | A few homes had their roofs torn off while others sustained lesser damage. One of the homes sustained some failure of exterior walls, and a large commercial building sustained major roof damage. A tractor trailer was lifted and flipped onto several large storage containers, and many trees were snapped and uprooted along the path. |
| EF0 | ENE of Montpelier | St. Helena | LA | 30.6935°N 90.5878°W | 1914–1915 | 0.3 mi (0.48 km) | 50 yd (46 m) | Unknown | A single–wide mobile home was shifted off of its block piers and lost part of its metal roof. A metal shed was destroyed and a few softwood trees were snapped as well. |
| EF1 | SE of Baldwin | St. Mary | LA | 29.8177°N 91.538°W | 2037–2039 | 2.62 mi (4.22 km) | 50 yd (46 m) | $40,000 | A total of 28 homes and two businesses were damaged by this high-end EF1 tornado. A restaurant and several mobile homes lost a majority of their metal roofs, a few homes were shifted off their pilings, and other homes sustained damage to their windows, sheet metal, garages, and carports. Many trees and at least 20 power poles were snapped. |
| EF0 | SW of White Castle | Iberville | LA | 30.1199°N 91.1733°W | 2110–2113 | 1.03 mi (1.66 km) | 200 yd (180 m) | Unknown | Garage doors were blown in, some structures sustained light roof damage, and sheds were demolished. One frail home had much of its poorly attached roof blown off. |
| EF3 | SW of Paincourtville to NE of Convent | Assumption, St. James | LA | 29.9903°N 91.0794°W | 2121–2142 | 20.73 mi (33.36 km) | 350 yd (320 m) | Unknown | 2 deaths – See section on this tornado – 75 people were injured, some critically. |
| EF1 | WSW of Bogue Chitto | Lincoln | MS | 31.3955°N 90.5334°W | 2145–2147 | 0.46 mi (0.74 km) | 75 yd (69 m) | $40,000 | Many large trees were snapped and uprooted, one of which landed on a home and caused minor roof damage. Skirting was blown off a mobile home and into a pasture. A feed house was damaged, with tin being strewn around. |
| EF1 | SW of Poplarville | Pearl River | MS | 30.686°N 89.7812°W | 2149–2201 | 9.52 mi (15.32 km) | 150 yd (140 m) | Unknown | Five homes were damaged, one of which had its metal roof ripped off. Numerous trees were downed along the path and a metal shed was destroyed. |
| EF1 | E of Angie, LA to E of Sandy Hook | Pearl River, Marion | MS | 30.9619°N 89.7115°W | 2150–2158 | 5.15 mi (8.29 km) | 200 yd (180 m) | $25,000 | A mobile home was shifted off its foundation, and trees and large branches were snapped. |
| EF0 | WSW of Baxterville | Lamar | MS | 31.0586°N 89.6481°W | 2207 | 0.1 mi (0.16 km) | 25 yd (23 m) | $5,000 | Several trees were snapped and uprooted. |
| EF1 | Akers | St. John the Baptist | LA | 30.2195°N 90.4354°W | 2215–2217 | 3.15 mi (5.07 km) | 250 yd (230 m) | $0 | Multiple cypress trees were snapped by a waterspout that moved ashore. |
| EF2 | ENE of Baxterville to NW of Purvis | Lamar | MS | 31.1157°N 89.5159°W | 2215–2223 | 5.63 mi (9.06 km) | 100 yd (91 m) | $105,000 | 1 death – A double-wide mobile home was completely destroyed by this low-end EF2 tornado, killing one person. Debris from the home was scattered up to 125 yards away, and nearby car was rolled 75 yards. The roof of a chicken house was blown off, and multiple trees and power poles were snapped along the path. |
| EF0 | ENE of Reform | Pickens | AL | 33.3941°N 87.9672°W | 2222–2231 | 4.8 mi (7.7 km) | 150 yd (140 m) | $0 | Trees were snapped or uprooted, and a home and a shed sustained minor roof damage. |
| EF1 | SW of West Hattiesburg | Lamar | MS | 31.2265°N 89.423°W | 2229–2231 | 1.42 mi (2.29 km) | 75 yd (69 m) | $10,000 | Several trees were snapped and minor roof damage occurred. A mobile home was shifted off of its foundation and a shed was destroyed as well. |
| EF2 | Laplace | St. John the Baptist | LA | 30.0732°N 90.5067°W | 2232–2244 | 4.69 mi (7.55 km) | 250 yd (230 m) | $0 | A high-end EF2 tornado caused major damage in Laplace. Many homes and duplexes sustained severe damage, some sustaining total loss of roofs and exterior walls. One two-story house in town lost half of its second floor. A church and several businesses also sustained roof, window, and fascia damage. Trees, power poles, and light poles were snapped along the path, and some warehouse buildings were severely damaged as well. 17 people were injured. |
| EF0 | Madisonville | St. Tammany | LA | 30.3779°N 90.1613°W | 2241–2242 | 0.38 mi (0.61 km) | 25 yd (23 m) | Unknown | An open air Coast Guard boat shed was destroyed. A bar had minor fascia damage as well. |
| EF0 | Benton | Yazoo | MS | 32.8184°N 90.2652°W | 2242–2244 | 1.15 mi (1.85 km) | 100 yd (91 m) | $25,000 | A weak tornado damaged trees, signs, and fences in town, with several trees snapped or blown down. |
| EF0 | NW of New Hebron | Simpson | MS | 31.7717°N 90.0531°W | 2246–2247 | 0.62 mi (1.00 km) | 40 yd (37 m) | $13,000 | A brief tornado snapped and uprooted trees. |
| EF0 | Lacombe | St. Tammany | LA | 30.32°N 89.9692°W | 2313–2315 | 1.5 mi (2.4 km) | 75 yd (69 m) | Unknown | Plastic greenhouses were damaged at a nursery in town, two mobile homes sustained skirting and window damage, and homes sustained damage to their shingles, siding, and fascia. Multiple trees were uprooted along the path. |
| EF1 | SE of Sand Hill | Greene | MS | 31.2627°N 88.7064°W | 2325–2327 | 1.51 mi (2.43 km) | 75 yd (69 m) | $100,000 | Metal roofing material from a barn was lofted into a tree, with some structural damage to the barn observed as well. A trailer was overturned, a vehicle was moved, and numerous trees were downed or snapped as well. |
| EF1 | ESE of Sand Hill | Greene | MS | 31.3112°N 88.6494°W | 2332–2333 | 0.03 mi (0.048 km) | 75 yd (69 m) | $25,000 | A couple of trees were sheared off, snapped, or uprooted. |
| EF1 | W of State Line | Greene, Wayne | MS | 31.4313°N 88.5348°W | 2345–2347 | 1.6 mi (2.6 km) | 150 yd (140 m) | $200,000 | Numerous large trees were snapped or uprooted, and an outbuilding was destroyed by a falling tree. An old log cabin had its window panes blown out and large portions of its roof destroyed. |
| EF1 | S of Pigeye to WSW of Hackleburg | Marion | AL | 34.2265°N 87.9189°W | 0001–0005 | 2.22 mi (3.57 km) | 300 yd (270 m) | $0 | A tornado developed near US 43 and moved north-northwest, with damage mostly confined to trees. One garage and a home sustained negligible damage as well, with damage to the home's roof. |
| EF0 | ESE of Lumberton | Forrest | MS | 30.9574°N 89.3334°W | 0001–0009 | 3.92 mi (6.31 km) | 75 yd (69 m) | $15,000 | A power pole and a few trees were snapped. |
| EF3 | NW of Pensacola International Airport to SSE of Pea Ridge | Escambia, Santa Rosa | FL | 30.4907°N 87.2052°W | 0210–0221 | 5.67 mi (9.12 km) | 300 yd (270 m) | $22,075,000 | See section on this tornado – Three people were injured. |
| EF0 | SE of Wicksburg | Houston | AL | 31.195°N 85.6067°W | 0415–0419 | 2.76 mi (4.44 km) | 200 yd (180 m) | $50,000 | Barns and porches had their metal roofing uplifted and blown off, while trees in the area were downed. |
| EF1 | SSE of Pinckard to SE of Midland City | Houston, Dale | AL | 31.2479°N 85.5317°W | 0424–0430 | 4.83 mi (7.77 km) | 200 yd (180 m) | $0 | Numerous pine trees were snapped and uprooted. |
| EF1 | Northwestern Dothan | Houston | AL | 31.2642°N 85.4491°W | 0431–0434 | 1.63 mi (2.62 km) | 350 yd (320 m) | $50,000 | Homes sustained minor roof damage, and a concrete block construction baseball dugout was leveled. Power poles were snapped as well. |
| EF1 | NNW of Dothan to WNW of Kinsey | Houston | AL | 31.2651°N 85.4106°W | 0434–0439 | 3.66 mi (5.89 km) | 900 yd (820 m) | $75,000 | Five power poles were snapped, several houses and a barn sustained roof damage, and trees were damaged. |
| EF1 | WNW of Headland | Henry | AL | 31.3531°N 85.3769°W | 0438–0440 | 1.09 mi (1.75 km) | 300 yd (270 m) | $50,000 | Large trees were uprooted, a house sustained roof damage, an RV was overturned, and a shed was destroyed. |
| EF0 | NE of Balkum | Henry | AL | 31.436°N 85.2071°W | 0454–0455 | 0.4 mi (0.64 km) | 100 yd (91 m) | $0 | Large trees were snapped or uprooted, including one that sustained minor debarking. |
| EF1 | SSE of Wills Crossroads | Henry | AL | 31.497°N 85.157°W | 0502–0503 | 0.5 mi (0.80 km) | 150 yd (140 m) | $0 | Many large trees were snapped or uprooted. |

=== February 24 event ===
List of confirmed tornadoes – Wednesday, February 24, 2016
| EF# | Location | County / Parish | State | Start Coord. | Time (UTC) | Path length | Max width | Damage | Summary |
|---|---|---|---|---|---|---|---|---|---|
| EF1 | NW of Blakely | Early | GA | 31.4151°N 84.9804°W | 0507–0512 | 2.24 mi (3.60 km) | 350 yd (320 m) | $0 | Many mature, healthy trees in a grove were snapped or uprooted. |
| EF1 | SW of Sasser | Terrell | GA | 31.6405°N 84.4200°W | 0555–0602 | 5.09 mi (8.19 km) | 200 yd (180 m) | $0 | Pine and pecan trees were snapped and uprooted. |
| EF1 | WNW of Warwick | Lee | GA | 31.8496°N 84.0279°W | 0626–0627 | 0.2 mi (0.32 km) | 75 yd (69 m) | $50,000 | The roof to a mobile home sustained significant damage, and a single-family home had its asphalt roof completely removed. |
| EF1 | SSW of Whigham to SSE of Akridge | Grady | GA | 30.8601°N 84.3365°W | 0745–0802 | 12.81 mi (20.62 km) | 400 yd (370 m) | $20,000 | A tornado primarily damaged trees and power poles, along with a few homes that were hit by falling trees. A mobile home with partial anchoring was displaced from its foundation, and several trees were snapped as well. |
| EF0 | SW of Columbiana | Shelby | AL | 33.1593°N 86.6673°W | 1004–1005 | 1.11 mi (1.79 km) | 80 yd (73 m) | $0 | A mobile home was partially shifted off its foundation, a home sustained minor roof damage, and trees were snapped or uprooted. |
| EF1 | S of Duette | Manatee | FL | 27.54°N 82.20°W | 1727–1739 | 8.58 mi (13.81 km) | 50 yd (46 m) | $0 | Tree trunks were snapped across a broad area. |
| EF1 | Ararat | Patrick | VA | 36.5985°N 80.5038°W | 1745–1747 | 1.4 mi (2.3 km) | 800 yd (730 m) | $345,000 | A half-dozen homes sustained roof damage; another poorly constructed house had its roof completely ripped off. Several outbuildings and fences were destroyed, a mobile home was blown off its foundation, and numerous trees were snapped or uprooted. |
| EF0 | ESE of Fort Lonesome | Hillsborough | FL | 27.65°N 82.06°W | 1745–1748 | 0.92 mi (1.48 km) | 30 yd (27 m) | $0 | Members of the public observed a tornado moving across an open field; it caused no damage. |
| EF0 | Warsaw | Duplin | NC | 34.998°N 78.089°W | 1757–1758 | 0.54 mi (0.87 km) | 150 yd (140 m) | $5,000 | Extensive tree damage was observed. |
| EF0 | WSW of Seven Springs | Wayne | NC | 35.2169°N 77.9213°W | 1810–1812 | 1.01 mi (1.63 km) | 75 yd (69 m) | $50,000 | Numerous trees were downed and branches snapped. A turkey barn and several mobile homes were damaged, and a shed and a fence were destroyed. |
| EF1 | SSE of Hopewell | Duplin | NC | 35.16°N 77.974°W | 1813–1814 | 0.17 mi (0.27 km) | 100 yd (91 m) | $100,000 | A brief tornado snapped eight power poles and blew the roof off of a mobile home. |
| EF0 | SE of Murdock | Charlotte | FL | 27.0071°N 82.1425°W | 1815–1816 | 0.22 mi (0.35 km) | 50 yd (46 m) | $50,000 | Numerous tree branches were snapped. |
| EF1 | NW of Harbour Heights | Charlotte | FL | 26.9991°N 82.0391°W | 1822–1827 | 2.72 mi (4.38 km) | 100 yd (91 m) | $1,600,000 | A total of 33 homes were damaged, including 28 with low to moderate damage and five with major damage. Numerous pool cages were destroyed, trees were snapped or uprooted, at least eight vehicles were picked up and moved, and power lines were damaged. One person was injured. |
| EF1 | Waverly | Sussex, Surry | VA | 36.9922°N 77.1234°W | 1931–1941 | 8.86 mi (14.26 km) | 300 yd (270 m) | $2,615,000 | 3 deaths – Two mobile homes were destroyed, several homes and businesses were heavily damaged, and numerous trees were downed throughout town by this high-end EF1 tornado. Eight people were also injured. This was the deadliest tornado of the outbreak as well as the first deadly tornado to affect Virginia during the month of February since 1950. |
| EF0 | Eastern Colerain | Bertie | NC | 36.1953°N 76.7638°W | 1954–1955 | 0.48 mi (0.77 km) | 50 yd (46 m) | $25,000 | Several trees were damaged, and a small outbuilding was blown over. |
| EF0 | SE of Patrick to SW of Cheraw | Chesterfield | SC | 34.5585°N 80.0328°W | 2016–2025 | 8.89 mi (14.31 km) | 70 yd (64 m) | Unknown | A weak tornado touched down three separate times between Patrick and Cheraw. Several trees were downed, and one tree had its top blown off. |
| EF3 | SW of Chap to Holliday Lake State Park | Campbell, Appomattox | VA | 37.2283°N 78.8641°W | 2027–2044 | 17.32 mi (27.87 km) | 400 yd (370 m) | $11,210,000 | 1 death – See section on this tornado – Seven people were injured. |
| EF1 | NW of Durham | Durham | NC | 36.0594°N 78.945°W | 2100–2101 | 0.43 mi (0.69 km) | 30 yd (27 m) | $100,000 | Extensive tree damage was observed. |
| EF0 | WNW of Fork Union | Fluvanna | VA | 37.7597°N 78.2912°W | 2110–2120 | 4.42 mi (7.11 km) | 350 yd (320 m) | $480,000 | Numerous trees were uprooted, an outbuilding was destroyed, and several homes sustained damage to their shingles, siding, and gutters. |
| EF2 | NE of Oxford | Granville, Vance | NC | 36.3496°N 78.5443°W | 2132–2138 | 5.07 mi (8.16 km) | 125 yd (114 m) | $600,000 | Numerous trees were snapped or uprooted, several outbuildings were blown down or destroyed, and several cars and storage trailers were tossed up to 50 yd (46 m). Seven homes were damaged, including one that had its roof and some exterior walls blown away. |
| EF1 | WSW of Bracey | Mecklenburg | VA | 36.6047°N 78.2435°W | 2148–2155 | 5 mi (8.0 km) | 150 yd (140 m) | $310,000 | Numerous trees were snapped or downed, a few homes sustained minor roof damage, a home and a shed sustained minor structural damage, and a home was shifted off its foundation. |
| EF3 | N of Bruington, VA to SSE of Beauvue, MD | King and Queen (VA), Essex (VA), Richmond (VA), Westmoreland (VA), St. Mary (MD) | VA, MD | 37.8001°N 76.9989°W | 2334–0014 | 36.89 mi (59.37 km) | 500 yd (460 m) | $10,038,000 | See section on this tornado – 25 people were injured, some critically. |
| EF1 | NNW of Wyalusing | Bradford | PA | 41.7153°N 76.2871°W | 0020–0022 | 1.09 mi (1.75 km) | 100 yd (91 m) | $25,000 | A garage was heavily damaged, a couple of homes sustained roof damage, and trees were damaged. A tornado warning was never issued for this storm. |
| EF2 | NNW of Gap to NNE of White Horse | Lancaster | PA | 40.01°N 76.0297°W | 0038–0045 | 4.87 mi (7.84 km) | 400 yd (370 m) | $8,000,000 | Approximately 50 structures were impacted, including numerous farm outbuildings and barns that were destroyed. Two two-story homes lost a majority of their roofs, while other homes, farm buildings, and sheds sustained lesser degrees of roof and siding damage. A large one-room Amish schoolhouse was destroyed, and a large building with more than 100 people inside attending an auction inside had its roof ripped off. Additionally, a van with several passengers was blown about 10 feet (3.0 m) into a field, several large granite tombstones in a cemetery were blown over, and numerous trees were downed. Similar to the storm above, a tornado warning was never issued for this storm. This became the first EF2+ tornado in February in state history. |
| EF1 | ESE of Laneview to WNW of Litwalton | Middlesex, Lancaster | VA | 37.7488°N 76.6854°W | 0125–0133 | 6.06 mi (9.75 km) | 150 yd (140 m) | $387,000 | A garage sustained collapse of a brick wall, the roof was ripped off a house, and an outbuilding was destroyed. Numerous large trees were snapped. |
| EF1 | ENE of Mascot to SSE of Water View | Middlesex | VA | 37.6485°N 76.6492°W | 0135–0141 | 4.01 mi (6.45 km) | 150 yd (140 m) | $677,000 | A house was destroyed, a barn had its second story swept away, and another barn had its roof ripped off. |

== March ==
Confirmed tornadoes by Enhanced Fujita rating
| EFU | EF0 | EF1 | EF2 | EF3 | EF4 | EF5 | Total |
|---|---|---|---|---|---|---|---|
| 0 | 38 | 36 | 9 | 0 | 0 | 0 | 83 |

=== March 1 event ===
List of confirmed tornadoes – Tuesday, March 1, 2016
| EF# | Location | County / Parish | State | Start Coord. | Time (UTC) | Path length | Max width | Damage (2016 USD) |
|---|---|---|---|---|---|---|---|---|
| EF2 | SW of McCalla | Jefferson | AL | 33.326°N 86.9965°W | 2343–2350 | 5.59 mi (9.00 km) | 465 yd (425 m) | Unknown |
| EF2 | A strong tornado impacted 26 homes; of those, 14 sustained minor damage, 6 sustained significant damage, and 6 more were destroyed. A pro shop on a golf course and a church sustained minor roof damage, a vehicle was overturned, and a free-standing garage was completely destroyed. Several hundred trees were snapped or uprooted. Four people were injured. | | | | | | | |
| EF0 | SE of Sylacauga | Talladega, Clay | AL | 33.1181°N 86.2246°W | 0042–0045 | 2.99 mi (4.81 km) | 80 yd (73 m) | Unknown |
| EF0 | Four outbuildings were either damaged or destroyed, and six homes sustained minor damage. Numerous trees were downed as well. The tornado lifted immediately after crossing into Clay County. | | | | | | | |
| EF0 | Northern Opelika | Lee | AL | 32.6832°N 85.4056°W | 0227–0231 | 3.08 mi (4.96 km) | 100 yd (91 m) | $0 |
| EF0 | Twenty to thirty trees were snapped or uprooted. | | | | | | | |

=== March 3 event ===
List of confirmed tornadoes – Thursday, March 3, 2016
| EF# | Location | County / Parish | State | Start Coord. | Time (UTC) | Path length | Max width | Damage (2016 USD) |
|---|---|---|---|---|---|---|---|---|
| EF1 | W of Falco | Escambia | AL | 31.0333°N 86.7249°W | 0036 | 0.14 mi (0.23 km) | 25 yd (23 m) | $15,000 |
| EF1 | A brief tornado caused significant roof damage to a brick home and destroyed a large shed, and also damaged two other sheds. | | | | | | | |

=== March 7 event ===
List of confirmed tornadoes – Monday, March 7, 2016
| EF# | Location | County / Parish | State | Start Coord. | Time (UTC) | Path length | Max width | Damage (2016 USD) |
|---|---|---|---|---|---|---|---|---|
| EF1 | E of Cool | Parker | TX | 32.79°N 97.98°W | 0008–0014 | 2.15 mi (3.46 km) | 300 yd (270 m) | $100,000 |
| EF1 | Significant damage occurred to two homes and several pieces of farm equipment. | | | | | | | |

=== March 8 event ===
List of confirmed tornadoes – Tuesday, March 8, 2016
| EF# | Location | County / Parish | State | Start Coord. | Time (UTC) | Path length | Max width | Damage (2016 USD) |
|---|---|---|---|---|---|---|---|---|
| EF0 | Dublin | Erath | TX | 32.0833°N 98.3435°W | 1230–1231 | 0.29 mi (0.47 km) | 100 yd (91 m) | $130,000 |
| EF0 | Brief tornado caused minor damage to ten buildings in downtown Dublin. | | | | | | | |
| EF1 | Stephenville | Erath | TX | 32.2055°N 98.2172°W | 1255–1259 | 2.19 mi (3.52 km) | 100 yd (91 m) | $500,000 |
| EF1 | Several businesses and homes were damaged and an apartment complex was heavily damaged in the city of Stephenville. | | | | | | | |
| EF0 | ENE of Tolar | Hood | TX | 32.4014°N 97.8896°W | 1321–1323 | 0.37 mi (0.60 km) | 160 yd (150 m) | $50,000 |
| EF0 | Three manufactured homes were damaged along U.S. Highway 377. | | | | | | | |
| EF0 | ENE of Granbury | Hood | TX | 32.4571°N 97.7586°W | 1336 | 0.01 mi (0.016 km) | 40 yd (37 m) | $4,000 |
| EF0 | A brief tornado touched down over open land near a golf course. | | | | | | | |
| EF0 | Southern Benbrook | Tarrant | TX | 32.6547°N 97.4828°W | 1403–1406 | 1.89 mi (3.04 km) | 70 yd (64 m) | $330,000 |
| EF0 | A tornado embedded in a much larger squall line tracked along the northern parts of Benbrook Lake. A marina, about 20 boats, and several storage sheds were damaged, and many trees were uprooted or had large branches downed near the lake. | | | | | | | |
| EF0 | N of Lampasas | Lampasas | TX | 31.1672°N 98.175°W | 1417–1419 | 0.21 mi (0.34 km) | 100 yd (91 m) | $60,000 |
| EF0 | Brief tornado damaged a structure and caused tree damage near U.S. 281. | | | | | | | |
| EF1 | The Colony | Denton | TX | 33.0965°N 96.8695°W | 1453–1454 | 0.15 mi (0.24 km) | 40 yd (37 m) | $90,000 |
| EF1 | A brief, narrow tornado embedded in a large swath of downburst wind damage caused damage to the roofs, fences and garage doors of about six homes and damaged several power poles. | | | | | | | |
| EF0 | SE of Andice | Williamson | TX | 30.7522°N 97.8314°W | 1517–1519 | 1.5 mi (2.4 km) | 50 yd (46 m) | Unknown |
| EF0 | A small tornado caused minor damage to trees, outbuildings and a few residences. | | | | | | | |
| EF1 | SSE of Goodlow | Navarro | TX | 32.0112°N 96.1692°W | 1823–1824 | 1.91 mi (3.07 km) | 150 yd (140 m) | $70,000 |
| EF1 | A brief tornado touched down near U.S. 287 and broke several power poles and damaged two manufactured homes. | | | | | | | |
| EF0 | Southern Trinidad to Malakoff | Henderson | TX | 32.1285°N 96.0874°W | 1837–1841 | 5.3 mi (8.5 km) | 80 yd (73 m) | $200,000 |
| EF0 | Several trees and homes were damaged near Trinidad, and trees were damaged farther to the northeast along Highway 34. In Malakoff, about ten homes sustained damage, one of which lost its chimney, part of its roof, and several trees on the property. | | | | | | | |
| EF1 | ENE of Katemcy to WNW of Fredonia | Mason, McCulloch | TX | 30.93°N 99.2°W | 0110–0117 | 1.64 mi (2.64 km) | 185 yd (169 m) | Unknown |
| EF1 | Tornado damaged a grove of trees, snapping many tree trunks, and destroyed an outbuilding. | | | | | | | |

=== March 10 event ===
List of confirmed tornadoes – Thursday, March 10, 2016
| EF# | Location | County / Parish | State | Start Coord. | Time (UTC) | Path length | Max width | Damage (2016 USD) |
|---|---|---|---|---|---|---|---|---|
| EF0 | Raleigh | Smith | MS | 32.028°N 89.5409°W | 2204–2207 | 1.22 mi (1.96 km) | 80 yd (73 m) | $20,000 |
| EF0 | An outbuilding had part of its metal roof taken off, several trees were snapped, and another tree had its limbs snapped off. | | | | | | | |

=== March 12 event ===
List of confirmed tornadoes – Saturday, March 12, 2016
| EF# | Location | County / Parish | State | Start Coord. | Time (UTC) | Path length | Max width | Damage (2016 USD) |
|---|---|---|---|---|---|---|---|---|
| EF0 | N of Hazel | Calloway | KY | 36.551°N 88.3257°W | 0222–0223 | 0.32 mi (0.51 km) | 50 yd (46 m) | $30,000 |
| EF0 | A single family residence had about half of its roof torn off, a single wide mobile home had its underpinning blown away, small tree limbs were broken and power lines were downed. | | | | | | | |

=== March 13 event ===
List of confirmed tornadoes – Sunday, March 13, 2016
| EF# | Location | County / Parish | State | Start Coord. | Time (UTC) | Path length | Max width | Damage (2016 USD) |
|---|---|---|---|---|---|---|---|---|
| EF1 | ESE of Bates to W of Waldron | Scott | AR | 34.8529°N 94.2451°W | 2056–2107 | 4.81 mi (7.74 km) | 850 yd (780 m) | $150,000 |
| EF1 | Trees were uprooted and several buildings were damaged, including seven to eight homes. | | | | | | | |
| EF1 | WNW of Crystal Springs to Lake Ouachita | Montgomery | AR | 34.5670°N 93.4380°W | 2148–2152 | 1.7 mi (2.7 km) | 180 yd (160 m) | $200,000 |
| EF1 | Significant damage occurred to several boat docks, trees and power lines. Several homes were damaged, including a mobile home with substantial damage. Video footage indicates that the tornado moved into Lake Ouachita. | | | | | | | |
| EF0 | S of Fourche | Pulaski, Perry | AR | 34.9355°N 92.6487°W | 2315–2319 | 1.71 mi (2.75 km) | 50 yd (46 m) | $10,000 |
| EF0 | Mostly tree damage occurred, with minor damage to a roof. | | | | | | | |
| EF0 | E of Moscow | Jefferson | AR | 34.1450°N 91.7451°W | 2332–2333 | 0.56 mi (0.90 km) | 50 yd (46 m) | $8,000 |
| EF0 | Bricks were removed from a home and several trees were downed. | | | | | | | |
| EF0 | E of Bayou Meto | Arkansas | AR | 34.2329°N 91.4714°W | 0000–0002 | 1.29 mi (2.08 km) | 50 yd (46 m) | $0 |
| EF0 | A tornado tracked through very rural areas and was mostly confirmed by photographs. No structural damage was reported. | | | | | | | |
| EF0 | SE of Crocketts Bluff | Arkansas | AR | 34.4136°N 91.2137°W | 0032–0034 | 1.22 mi (1.96 km) | 50 yd (46 m) | $8,000 |
| EF0 | A shed was destroyed, roof damage occurred to a nearby home, and some tin from the shed was carried into a field well and wrapped around a tree. | | | | | | | |
| EF0 | Marvell | Phillips | AR | 34.5391°N 90.9558°W | 0054–0059 | 2.88 mi (4.63 km) | 100 yd (91 m) | $25,000 |
| EF0 | Intermittent damage occurred from west-southwest of Marvell into Marvell. Wooden power poles were downed and one outbuilding was damaged along Arkansas Highway 1 southwest of town. In town, street lights and a power pole were bent, tree limbs were broken, and a baseball field scoreboard was downed. | | | | | | | |
| EF0 | N of Lexa | Phillips | AR | 34.6178°N 90.8282°W | 0116–0123 | 3.79 mi (6.10 km) | 125 yd (114 m) | $35,000 |
| EF0 | Outbuildings and lightweight structures were damaged, roof damage occurred to a barn, and wooden power poles were downed. | | | | | | | |
| EF1 | N of Love Place | Cross | AR | 35.3298°N 90.5826°W | 0210–0215 | 1.96 mi (3.15 km) | 125 yd (114 m) | $25,000 |
| EF1 | Minor roof damage occurred to a house and an outbuilding and a couple of irrigation pivots were flipped. A hangar was damaged and a door was removed from a barn as well. | | | | | | | |
| EF1 | Southern Dermott to NE of Bellaire | Chicot, Desha | AR | 33.5082°N 91.4509°W | 0215–0225 | 8.96 mi (14.42 km) | 300 yd (270 m) | $2,505,000 |
| EF1 | Numerous trees were snapped or uprooted. Power lines were downed, a fence was laid down, a few sheds were destroyed, and several structures sustained minor roof damage. The South Delta Regional Correctional Facility suffered a direct hit, where several sections of the outer fence were torn down, five buildings in the complex sustained roof damage, with sheet paper and shingles were removed, and a metal gym building had a large section of the wall removed. The main building of the complex had about half of the roof was lifted up or had parts removed, and large portions of the foam insulation and sections of a thin roof covering were pulled out. A couple guard towers had windows blown out, and one employee was injured trying to exit the tower. | | | | | | | |
| EF0 | Northwestern Cleveland | Bolivar | MS | 33.7469°N 90.7459°W | 0313–0314 | 0.51 mi (0.82 km) | 50 yd (46 m) | $40,000 |
| EF0 | Several sections of tin were blown off of a restaurant, a fence and a shed were blown down, trees and tree limbs were downed, and minor fence damage occurred at a Delta State University athletic facility as the tornado lifted. | | | | | | | |

=== March 14 event ===
List of confirmed tornadoes – Monday, March 14, 2016
| EF# | Location | County / Parish | State | Start Coord. | Time (UTC) | Path length | Max width | Damage (2016 USD) |
|---|---|---|---|---|---|---|---|---|
| EF1 | NW of Wheatville | Preble | OH | 39.694°N 84.5835°W | 1738–1740 | 1.14 mi (1.83 km) | 75 yd (69 m) | $60,000 |
| EF1 | A section of wood and metal roofing material measuring about 55 by 15 feet (16.8 by 4.6 m) was lifted from a barn and strewn around 100 feet (30 m) to the northeast near the beginning of the path. One utility pole was also snapped at this location, and a section of metal roofing material was carried about 0.35 miles (0.56 km) and deposited in an area of trees. Another barn measuring approximately 65 by 45 feet (20 by 14 m) was completely destroyed, with wood and metal roofing material from the barn was strewn over 0.5 miles (0.80 km). | | | | | | | |
| EF1 | W of Phillipsburg | Montgomery, Miami | OH | 39.882°N 84.4272°W | 1816–1822 | 2.98 mi (4.80 km) | 40 yd (37 m) | $250,000 |
| EF1 | A farmhouse had its entire roof lifted off, a garage was shifted off of its foundation with all walls collapsed, and a large barn nearby lost 20 percent of its roof. Severe damage occurred to a barn and a wood shed near the start of the path, a garage was destroyed, and chimney, siding and significant barn damage occurred. Minor roof damage also occurred to another property and trees were damaged along the path. | | | | | | | |
| EF0 | ESE of Pitsburg | Darke | OH | 39.9773°N 84.4653°W | 1826–1828 | 0.75 mi (1.21 km) | 100 yd (91 m) | $20,000 |
| EF0 | A few trees were downed, and a home received roof and chimney damage. A metal barn was partly peeled. Other minor damage occurred. | | | | | | | |
| EF1 | SE of Arcanum | Darke | OH | 39.9615°N 84.5441°W | 1826–1832 | 2.25 mi (3.62 km) | 150 yd (140 m) | $75,000 |
| EF1 | A horse stable was almost completely destroyed. Minor damage occurred at two outbuildings and to the roof of a house. Several trees were downed and/or snapped. | | | | | | | |
| EF0 | SW of Laura | Miami | OH | 39.9782°N 84.4268°W | 1830–1832 | 0.68 mi (1.09 km) | 60 yd (55 m) | $75,000 |
| EF0 | One home had its sheet metal roof almost completely peeled off, a shed was destroyed, minor shingle damage occurred to a garage and a home, and minor tree damage occurred, with a few trees downed. | | | | | | | |

=== March 15 event ===
List of confirmed tornadoes – Tuesday, March 15, 2016
| EF# | Location | County / Parish | State | Start Coord. | Time (UTC) | Path length | Max width | Damage (2016 USD) |
|---|---|---|---|---|---|---|---|---|
| EF2 | Good Hope to NNE of Avon | McDonough, Warren, Fulton | IL | 40.5621°N 90.6736°W | 2326–0000 | 16.5 mi (26.6 km) | 400 yd (370 m) | $415,000 |
| EF2 | This large tornado initially caused minor roof damage in Good Hope before reaching EF2 strength as it moved to the northeast, where a few homes were severely damaged. Most of the damage occurred to farm outbuildings and trees along the path. In Fulton County, only tree damage occurred before the tornado dissipated. | | | | | | | |
| EF2 | E of Hampton to NE of Rapids City | Rock Island | IL | 41.5365°N 90.3624°W | 0025–0035 | 4.78 mi (7.69 km) | 200 yd (180 m) | $750,000 |
| EF2 | A high-end EF2 tornado tracked north then curved to the east through upper Rock Island County, following the banks of the Mississippi River and narrowly missing Rapids City. An estimated 40 homes were damaged, with the most severe damage in a rural subdivision on the outskirts of East Moline, where several homes were heavily damaged and four were destroyed, sustaining total loss of roofs and exterior walls. Ten people reported minor injuries. | | | | | | | |
| EF0 | NNE of McCausland | Scott, Clinton | IA | 41.7593°N 90.4359°W | 0033–0035 | 1.2 mi (1.9 km) | 50 yd (46 m) | $0 |
| EF0 | An EF0 tornado caused damage mainly to trees. | | | | | | | |
| EF2 | NW of Trivoli to SW of Kickapoo | Peoria | IL | 40.7135°N 89.9146°W | 0042–0057 | 7.55 mi (12.15 km) | 440 yd (400 m) | $1,000,000 |
| EF2 | Several outbuildings and grain bins were destroyed, other outbuildings and garages were damaged, and several homes and a church sustained roof damage, with one home losing its complete roof. A car was picked up and thrown 50 yards (46 m) into a field, a pickup truck was damaged, and many trees were downed. | | | | | | | |
| EF1 | NW of Curran | Sangamon | IL | 39.7404°N 89.8153°W | 0044–0050 | 3.62 mi (5.83 km) | 75 yd (69 m) | $280,000 |
| EF1 | One home had windows blown out and shingles removed, a second home lost most of its roof and had a wall blown out, and two more homes sustained minor shingle damage. A barn lost its roof, and many trees were downed as well. | | | | | | | |
| EF1 | ENE of Low Moor | Clinton | IA | 41.8052°N 90.3175°W | 0049–0051 | 1.35 mi (2.17 km) | 75 yd (69 m) | $50,000 |
| EF1 | A tornado hit a mobile home park, destroying at least five mobile homes and damaging numerous others. Three people were injured in the event. | | | | | | | |
| EF1 | SE of Bryant to S of Andover | Clinton | IA | 41.9164°N 90.2883°W | 0057–0101 | 3.38 mi (5.44 km) | 300 yd (270 m) | Unknown |
| EF1 | A tornado damaged farm outbuildings and trees as it tracked through northern Clinton County. | | | | | | | |
| EF0 | Northern Peoria | Peoria | IL | 40.7304°N 89.6491°W | 0105–0114 | 3.68 mi (5.92 km) | 200 yd (180 m) | $260,000 |
| EF0 | Intermittent tornado on the northwest side of downtown Peoria caused roof, gutter, soffit, and ceiling damage to one building, and caused roof and siding damage to other homes and commercial buildings. A power pole was broken, and numerous trees were downed, one of which fell onto a garage. | | | | | | | |
| EF0 | N of Deer Grove | Whiteside | IL | 41.6636°N 89.6925°W | 0133–0138 | 1.76 mi (2.83 km) | 50 yd (46 m) | Unknown |
| EF0 | A tornado caused shingle and siding damage to two homes and uprooted a tree. In relation to the event, an irrigation rig was partially overturned when it was struck by the tornado. | | | | | | | |

=== March 19 event ===
List of confirmed tornadoes – Saturday, March 19, 2016
| EF# | Location | County / Parish | State | Start Coord. | Time (UTC) | Path length | Max width | Damage (2016 USD) |
|---|---|---|---|---|---|---|---|---|
| EF0 | ESE of Fort Lauderdale | Broward | FL | 26.1145°N 80.1047°W | 1845–1846 | 0.17 mi (0.27 km) | 50 yd (46 m) | Unknown |
| EF0 | A waterspout moved ashore, flipping chairs and blowing umbrellas. A few small boats were overturned and cars were severely damaged as well. | | | | | | | |

=== March 23 event ===
List of confirmed tornadoes – Wednesday, March 23, 2016
| EF# | Location | County / Parish | State | Start Coord. | Time (UTC) | Path length | Max width | Damage (2016 USD) |
|---|---|---|---|---|---|---|---|---|
| EF5 | SW of Haslet | Tarrant | TX | 32.9404°N 97.3815°W | 0206–0208 | 1.5 mi (2.4 km) | 40 yd (37 m) | $90,000 |
A storage facility was impacted, with roofs, awnings, and storage units being damages. Metal from the roofs was blown about three-quarters of a mile (1.2 km) to the northeast, where fences were damaged in a subdivision.
| EF2 | SE of Stilwell, OK to NE of Evansville, AR | Adair (OK), Crawford (AR), Washington (AR) | OK, AR | 35.6916°N 94.5042°W | 0251–0306 | 11.1 mi (17.9 km) | 800 yd (730 m) | $375,000 |
| EF2 | Several mobile homes and outbuildings were destroyed, a couple site-built homes sustained severe damage, many trees were downed, and numerous power poles were snapped. Four people were injured, all in mobile homes. | | | | | | | |
| EF1 | NNE of Shell Knob | Barry, Stone | MO | 36.6784°N 93.578°W | 0408–0412 | 3.83 mi (6.16 km) | 200 yd (180 m) | $0 |
| EF1 | Several trees were either snapped or uprooted. | | | | | | | |

=== March 24 event ===
List of confirmed tornadoes – Thursday, March 24, 2016
| EF# | Location | County / Parish | State | Start Coord. | Time (UTC) | Path length | Max width | Damage (2016 USD) |
|---|---|---|---|---|---|---|---|---|
| EF0 | SW of Hanna | LaPorte | IN | 41.3747°N 86.8731°W | 1826–1827 | 0.09 mi (140 m) | 50 yd (46 m) | $75,000 |
| EF0 | Brief tornado southeast of South Wanatah removed about 80 percent of the roof from a pole barn. | | | | | | | |
| EF0 | NE of Hanna | LaPorte | IN | 41.4392°N 86.7301°W | 1830–1833 | 0.94 mi (1.51 km) | 100 yd (91 m) | $0 |
| EF0 | Many trees were downed, and four power poles were snapped. | | | | | | | |
| EF0 | ENE of Hanna | LaPorte | IN | 41.436°N 86.679°W | 1835–1837 | 0.51 mi (0.82 km) | 50 yd (46 m) | $0 |
| EF0 | A 1,000 lb (450 kg) metal feeder was tossed over a fence, several dozen calf pens were lifted and tossed over 0.5 mi (0.80 km), several trees were uprooted, and a center pivot irrigation system sustained damage to one of its units. | | | | | | | |
| EF1 | Southeast Lake Charles | Calcasieu | LA | 30.1915°N 93.1860°W | 1845–1846 | 0.14 mi (230 m) | 10 yd (9.1 m) | $7,000 |
| EF1 | The roof was lifted off a house and dropped onto three neighboring homes, as well as vehicles, to the east. Debris was scattered down the street, and an oak tree was snapped. | | | | | | | |
| EF0 | Edwardsburg | Cass | MI | 41.7925°N 86.1027°W | 1914–1918 | 1.34 mi (2.16 km) | 150 yd (140 m) | $100,000 |
| EF0 | Weak tornado touched down west of Edwardsburg and moved into the northern side of town, causing heavy damage to a barn and removing part of the roof from a church. Several trees were downed as well. | | | | | | | |
| EF0 | SW of McKenzie | Butler | AL | 31.5290°N 86.7244°W | 1930–1932 | 0.38 mi (0.61 km) | 50 yd (46 m) | $8,000 |
| EF0 | A brief tornado uprooted a couple trees and destroyed a metal storage building. | | | | | | | |

=== March 27 event ===
List of confirmed tornadoes – Sunday, March 27, 2016
| EF# | Location | County / Parish | State | Start Coord. | Time (UTC) | Path length | Max width | Damage (2016 USD) |
|---|---|---|---|---|---|---|---|---|
| EF1 | SSW of Camden | Benton | TN | 35.9651°N 88.1419°W | 2224–2229 | 2.01 mi (3.23 km) | 100 yd (91 m) | $25,000 |
| EF1 | Intermittent tornado damaged a barn's roof, blew in a large door on a metal workshop, and removed most of the workshop's roof. Numerous trees were downed as well. | | | | | | | |
| EF2 | NE of Cerulean to E of Crofton | Christian | KY | 36.9801°N 87.6681°W | 0000–0021 | 15.46 mi (24.88 km) | 200 yd (180 m) | $1,000,000 |
| EF2 | Sixteen barns were destroyed, with ten more sustaining minor to moderate damage, two homes sustained moderate damage, and ten tractors/farm equipment were damaged. A trench box weighing over 2,000 pounds (910 kg) was thrown at least 80 yards (73 m), and numerous trees were downed. | | | | | | | |
| EF0 | W of Crofton | Christian | KY | 37.05°N 87.5779°W | 0011–0017 | 3.4 mi (5.5 km) | 100 yd (91 m) | $6,000 |
| EF0 | Two homes sustained minor damage, and numerous trees were snapped or had broken limbs. | | | | | | | |
| EF0 | SW of Greenville | Christian, Muhlenberg | KY | 37.1179°N 87.3237°W | 0035–0040 | 4.87 mi (7.84 km) | 75 yd (69 m) | $4,000 |
| EF0 | Many trees and tree limbs were downed. | | | | | | | |

=== March 30 event ===
List of confirmed tornadoes – Wednesday, March 30, 2016
| EF# | Location | County / Parish | State | Start Coord. | Time (UTC) | Path length | Max width | Damage (2016 USD) |
|---|---|---|---|---|---|---|---|---|
| EF0 | ESE of Dexter | Cowley | KS | 37.1357°N 96.5858°W | 2148–2149 | 0.5 mi (0.80 km) | 50 yd (46 m) | $0 |
| EF0 | Trained storm spotters reported a brief tornado touchdown. | | | | | | | |
| EF2 | SSW of Sperry to N of Verdigris | Osage, Tulsa, Rogers | OK | 36.2151°N 96.0151°W | 0013–0055 | 20 mi (32 km) | 800 yd (730 m) | $2,825,000 |
| EF2 | Large tornado touched down southwest of Turley and moved through northern Tulsa, damaging numerous homes and businesses, destroying barns, causing significant damage to several metal industrial buildings, and throwing a horse trailer 50 yards (46 m) into a lake. In Rogers County, many more homes were damaged and several homes under construction, a few barns, and a business were destroyed. Many trees were downed, and numerous power poles were snapped along the path. Four people were injured. | | | | | | | |
| EF1 | ENE of Nowata | Nowata | OK | 36.7291°N 95.5523°W | 0048–0054 | 2.7 mi (4.3 km) | 120 yd (110 m) | $75,000 |
| EF1 | A 30 by 60 foot (9.1 by 18.3 m) metal-framed outbuilding and several wood-framed barns were destroyed, a couple of homes were damaged, and trees were snapped. | | | | | | | |
| EF2 | SW of Claremore to NE of Justice | Rogers | OK | 36.2840°N 95.6384°W | 0100–0113 | 6.4 mi (10.3 km) | 550 yd (500 m) | $1,000,000 |
| EF2 | This tornado touched down to the southwest of Claremore as the Tulsa tornado dissipated slightly off to the west. Numerous homes were damaged, with a group of homes in one area sustaining severe roof and wall damage, and several barns were either damaged or destroyed, including several at Will Rogers Downs moments before the tornado dissipated. Numerous trees were downed along the path. | | | | | | | |
| EF0 | NE of Centralia | Craig | OK | 36.8151°N 95.3178°W | 0118–0123 | 2.5 mi (4.0 km) | 100 yd (91 m) | $0 |
| EF0 | Tornado was observed by several storm chasers, remaining over open country and causing no damage. | | | | | | | |
| EF1 | S of Dermott | Chicot | AR | 33.4497°N 91.4455°W | 0411–0412 | 1.44 mi (2.32 km) | 100 yd (91 m) | $150,000 |
| EF1 | A 120-foot (37 m) tall radio antenna was blown over, a diesel tank was moved several yards, and an irrigation pivot was overturned. A few power poles were damaged and a tree was snapped as well. | | | | | | | |
| EF1 | Dermott | Chicot | AR | 33.5182°N 91.4503°W | 0415–0419 | 3.61 mi (5.81 km) | 150 yd (140 m) | $110,000 |
| EF1 | The tornado began on the west side of Dermott, where much of the roof was removed from a home, a carport was blown away, an outbuilding was damaged, and a pontoon boat was blown several yards. The tornado continued through the center of Dermott, downing trees and breaking a couple utility poles. Minor roof damage occurred to a senior care facility, an abandoned trailer was damaged, and a fence was blown down as well. On the east side of town, a light pole was broken and a small billboard was blown over. Further along the path, construction cones were blown away and a farm equipment shed was destroyed, where heavy foundation blocks and trailers were moved and debris was scattered over half a mile before the tornado dissipated. The entire path of this tornado was within one mile of the path of the March 13th tornado that struck Dermott. One person was injured. | | | | | | | |

=== March 31 event ===
List of confirmed tornadoes – Thursday, March 31, 2016
| EF# | Location | County / Parish | State | Start Coord. | Time (UTC) | Path length | Max width | Damage (2016 USD) |
|---|---|---|---|---|---|---|---|---|
| EF1 | ESE of Greensburg | St. Helena | LA | 30.7979°N 90.6077°W | 1055–1056 | 0.18 mi (290 m) | 50 yd (46 m) | $0 |
| EF1 | Brief tornado downed several trees. | | | | | | | |
| EF1 | S of Kentwood | Tangipahoa | LA | 30.8168°N 90.5397°W | 1105–1115 | 4.6 mi (7.4 km) | 250 yd (230 m) | $0 |
| EF1 | Numerous trees were downed, with several pine trees blocking traffic on Interstate 55. | | | | | | | |
| EF1 | Purvis | Lamar | MS | 31.1384°N 89.4195°W | 1253–1255 | 1.44 mi (2.32 km) | 50 yd (46 m) | $70,000 |
| EF1 | Two homes and an elementary school sustained minor roof damage, and several trees were downed, one of which fell on a house. | | | | | | | |
| EF1 | N of Utica | Daviess | KY | 37.6511°N 87.1286°W | 1902–1906 | 2.97 mi (4.78 km) | 250 yd (230 m) | $100,000 |
| EF1 | A mobile home and two barns were destroyed, and a few dozen trees were snapped or uprooted. | | | | | | | |
| EF1 | SE of Lafayette | Tippecanoe | IN | 40.3684°N 86.836°W | 2040–2041 | 0.14 mi (230 m) | 30 yd (27 m) | $50,000 |
| EF1 | Very brief tornado destroyed a guard shack, overturned a car, and damaged a construction trailer at Wabash National Trailers. | | | | | | | |
| EF1 | N of Counce | Hardin | TN | 35.0756°N 88.2889°W | 2128–2131 | 1.46 mi (2.35 km) | 75 yd (69 m) | $25,000 |
| EF1 | A house sustained roof damage, an RV was damaged, and trees and a power pole were downed just to the northwest of Pickwick Landing Dam. | | | | | | | |
| EF1 | SE of Linden to W of Hohenwald | Perry, Lewis | TN | 35.5523°N 87.7379°W | 2131–2137 | 3.49 mi (5.62 km) | 350 yd (320 m) | $20,000 |
| EF1 | An outbuilding was damaged, and hundreds of trees were downed. | | | | | | | |
| EF0 | NW of Hohenwald | Lewis | TN | 35.5957°N 87.6105°W | 2145–2147 | 0.71 mi (1.14 km) | 50 yd (46 m) | $5,000 |
| EF0 | Anticyclonic tornado caused minor roof damage to a house and a barn and downed several trees and large tree branches. | | | | | | | |
| EF1 | ENE of Albion | Noble | IN | 41.4102°N 85.3924°W | 2149–2150 | 0.51 mi (0.82 km) | 30 yd (27 m) | $0 |
| EF1 | A garage and a well house sustained damage. Debris from an impacted barn was tossed up to 0.5 mi (0.80 km). The roof of a log cabin, as well as a swing and picnic table, were all thrown. Power poles and trees were snapped. | | | | | | | |
| EF0 | Seafield | White | IN | 40.7463°N 86.9763°W | 2156–2159 | 3.11 mi (5.01 km) | 120 yd (110 m) | $0 |
| EF0 | A barn was destroyed, with its debris tossed several miles. Several steel power poles were blown over, a large pole barn sustained moderate roof damage, and a home sustained minor roof damage. | | | | | | | |
| EF1 | NW of Wabash | Wabash | IN | 40.8085°N 85.8807°W | 2156–2159 | 0.74 mi (1.19 km) | 60 yd (55 m) | $0 |
| EF1 | Brief tornado skipped to the northeast, initially destroying a small metal farm building, tearing metal roofing off a metal pole barn, and moving a single-wide manufactured home 4 feet (1.2 m) off its cinder-block foundation. Debris from the outbuilding and the pole barn was thrown about 1/4 mile (0.40 km) north-northeast. Further along, a porch roof was ripped from a home and a well-constructed wooden playground set was dragged about 30 yards (27 m). Several trees were downed along the path, and three utility poles were snapped just before the tornado lifted. | | | | | | | |
| EF1 | SW of New Hope to NNW of Ethelsville | Lowndes, Pickens | MS, AL | 33.4194°N 88.3701°W | 2318–2337 | 7.88 mi (12.68 km) | 600 yd (550 m) | $225,000 |
| EF1 | Large multiple-vortex tornado caused shingle damage to several homes, minor structural damage to a mobile home and a shed, and minor roof damage to a second shed. Two more sheds had their roofs peeled back, a fence was blown down, several power poles were snapped, and many trees were downed, a few of which fell on homes. | | | | | | | |
| EF0 | W of Meigs | Grady | GA | 31.07°N 84.27°W | 2338–2339 | 0.29 mi (0.47 km) | 50 yd (46 m) | $2,000 |
| EF0 | A brief tornado damaged power lines. | | | | | | | |
| EF1 | NE of Ethelsville | Pickens | AL | 33.4674°N 88.1877°W | 2343–2348 | 2.88 mi (4.63 km) | 350 yd (320 m) | $0 |
| EF1 | Tornado touched down southwest of Millport, causing roof and siding damage to three homes, either damaging or destroying several outbuildings, and downing numerous trees. | | | | | | | |
| EF1 | SE of Bluff to WNW of Hubbertville | Fayette | AL | 33.7762°N 87.8708°W | 0003–0013 | 3.72 mi (5.99 km) | 650 yd (590 m) | $0 |
| EF1 | Large tornado damaged several wood-frame barns and outbuildings and downed numerous trees. | | | | | | | |
| EF1 | NE of Hubbertville to SW of Eldridge | Fayette | AL | 33.8558°N 87.7001°W | 0027–0035 | 3.7 mi (6.0 km) | 500 yd (460 m) | $0 |
| EF1 | Many trees were downed. | | | | | | | |
| EF0 | N of Boley Springs | Fayette | AL | 33.6510°N 87.5288°W | 0105–0109 | 1.88 mi (3.03 km) | 400 yd (370 m) | $0 |
| EF0 | Weak tornado downed numerous trees. | | | | | | | |
| EF1 | SSW of Locust Fork | Blount | AL | 33.8767°N 86.6247°W | 0242–0244 | 0.32 mi (510 m) | 275 yd (251 m) | $0 |
| EF1 | Very brief tornado caused minor roof damage to three homes and heavily damaged a metal storage barn. In addition, a pontoon boat was lofted into the side of one of the homes and windows were broken out of another home. A few dozen trees were downed as well. | | | | | | | |
| EF2 | NE of Hartselle to NE of Priceville | Morgan, Limestone | AL | 34.4679°N 86.9299°W | 0254–0314 | 9.55 mi (15.37 km) | 200 yd (180 m) | Unknown |
| EF2 | Several mobile homes were impacted near Hartselle, with one being rolled 45 to 50 yards (41 to 46 m) and mostly destroyed and a second one being shifted about 10 feet (3.0 m) off its foundation. A carport and farm equipment were partially destroyed, and a small car was lifted and had its front bumper torn off. To the northeast, a couple houses suffered minor roof and siding damage, a few more homes sustained minor structural damage, and several headstones were either pushed over or broken at a cemetery. Further along, multiple sheds were destroyed, shingles were torn off two homes, and a double-wide mobile home was pushed off its piers and sustained roof damage. Many trees were downed along the path, with some falling on a few homes. | | | | | | | |

== See also ==
- Tornadoes of 2016
- List of United States tornadoes from April to May 2016
