= The Dirty Truth =

Studio album by Joanne Shaw Taylor
- Released: 21 September 2014
- Recorded: May 2014
- Studio: Bessie Blue Studios (Counce, Tennessee)
- Genre: Blues rock; electric blues
- Length: 41:56
- Label: Axehouse
- Producer: Jim Gaines

Joanne Shaw Taylor chronology
Songs from the Road (2013)	The Dirty Truth (2014)	Wild (2016)

Singles from The Dirty Truth
- 1. "Mud, Honey" Released: 2014; 2. "Fool in Love" Released: 2014; 3. "Wicked Soul" Released: 2015

The Dirty Truth is the fourth studio album by British blues rock musician Joanne Shaw Taylor. Recorded in May 2014 at Bessie Blue Studios in Counce, Tennessee with producer Jim Gaines, it was released on 21 September 2014 on Axehouse Music. The album was Taylor's first to register on the main UK Albums Chart, reaching number 41, and peaked at number 8 on the UK Independent Albums Chart and number 3 on the UK Jazz & Blues Albums Chart.

== Background ==
After switching producer, recording studio and backing band for her third album Almost Always Never, Joanne Shaw Taylor returned to working with White Sugar and Diamonds in the Dirt producer Jim Gaines at Bessie Blue Studios on The Dirty Truth, as well as the rhythm section used on both albums – bassist David Smith, drummer Steve Potts and keyboardist Rick Steff (on Diamonds in the Dirt only). Speaking about her decision to work with Gaines again, Taylor explained that "I wanted to go back into the studio with Jim to retain the same vibe that we captured on the first album". Some of the songs featured on The Dirty Truth were originally written and early versions recorded during sessions for Taylor's first two albums, including "Feels Like Home" and "Mud, Honey" (the latter of which was initially slated as the title for Diamonds in the Dirt). The album was the first to be released on Axehouse Music, Taylor's own "boutique label".

== Reception ==
Professional ratings
Review scores
Source	Rating
Classic Rock	3.5/5 stars
Daily Express	3/5 stars
Stereoboard.com	4/5 stars

Media response to The Dirty Truth was mixed, but generally positive. Reviewing the album for Classic Rock magazine, David Stubbs wrote that "these are songs you'll be happy to familiarise yourself with over repeated listenings and are worth that close attention". Stubbs praised Taylor's guitar playing, which he claims "channels Hendrix", as well as her "storytelling sensibility", describing the album overall as "mature and accomplished stuff indeed". However, the writer also criticised Taylor's "formidable, rasping vocal delivery" which he claimed caused some of the lyrics to become "a little lost". Similarly, Daily Express columnist Paul Stewart suggested that "Every track on this album is extremely gutsy and professional and worth a listen", but also proposed that the move away from blues styles in favour of more rock-influenced compositions may alienate some fans of the musician.

Multiple commentators reflected that The Dirty Truth sounded more "natural" and "stripped-back" than previous releases. Simon Ramsay for Stereoboard.com explained: "Although Taylor's never over-complicated her music, this album displays her desire to return to a more elemental sound after 2012's smooth Almost Always Never. In cahoots with producer Jim Gaines, who oversaw her first two albums, this fourth effort is a gritty, stripped-back collection of songs that move from destructive to delicate in the beat of a broken heart." Richard MacDougall of Blues Rock Review described The Dirty Truth as "natural" and suggested that it "sounds a little closer to home for Taylor". Ramsay, alongside Stubbs, recognised that although the album doesn't necessarily "push back any envelopes" within its well-established genre, it is nevertheless executed well.

== Track listing ==
All tracks are written by Joanne Shaw Taylor; track 8 co-written by Kevin Bowe

The Dirty Truth track listing
No.	Title	Length
1.	"Mud, Honey"	4:28
2.	"The Dirty Truth"	3:16
3.	"Wicked Soul"	4:19
4.	"Fool in Love"	4:04
5.	"Wrecking Ball"	3:32
6.	"Tried, Tested & True"	5:00
7.	"Outlaw Angel"	4:22
8.	"Shiver & Sigh"	5:08
9.	"Struck Down"	4:28
10.	"Feels Like Home"	3:19
Total length:		41:56

The Dirty Truth Live EP track listing
No.	Title	Length
1.	"Mud, Honey"	4:20
2.	"The Dirty Truth"	3:13
3.	"Fool in Love"	4:10
4.	"Outlaw Angel"	4:22
Total length:		16:05

== Personnel ==
Musicians

- Joanne Shaw Taylor – vocals, guitar
- David Smith – bass
- Steve Potts – drums
- Rick Steff – keyboards

Additional personnel

- Jim Gaines – production, mixing
- Brad Blackwood – mastering
- Marcus Sweeney-Bird – photography

== Charts ==
Chart performance for The Dirty Truth
Chart (2014)	Peak position
Scottish Albums (OCC)	40
UK Albums (OCC)	41
UK Independent Albums (OCC)	8
UK Independent Album Breakers (OCC)	1
UK Jazz & Blues Albums (OCC)	3
UK Physical Albums (OCC)	25
UK Record Store Chart (OCC)	23
