= Mascot (disambiguation) =

Mascot is a term for any person, animal, or object thought to bring luck.

Mascot may also refer to:

== Places ==
- Mascot, New South Wales, a suburb of Sydney
- Mascot, Nebraska, US
- Mascot, Tennessee, a city in the United States
- Mascot, Virginia, US

== Films ==
- Mascots (1929 film), a German silent film
- Mascots (2016 film), a Netflix mockumentary film

== Literature ==
- Mascot (book), 2023 children's novel
- The Mascot (book), 2007 Holocaust memoir

== Other uses ==
- MASCOT, a small asteroid lander on space probe Hayabusa2
- Mascot (software), a search engine which uses mass spectrometry data to identify proteins from sequence databases
- Mascot (sternwheeler), a steamboat in the Pacific Northwest, U.S., in the late 1800s and early 1900s
- "Mascot", the NATO reporting name for the training version of the Soviet Ilyushin Il-28 bomber
- Modular Approach to Software Construction Operation and Test, a design method for concurrent systems
- Mascot (car), a car made by AB Rååverken
- Mascot Pictures Corporation, an American film studio

== See also ==
- List of mascots
- Mascotte (disambiguation)
- Mascott
- Renault Mascott
