= Joanne Taylor =

Joanne Taylor may refer to:

- Joanne Courtney (born 1989), née Taylor, Canadian curler
- Joanne Shaw Taylor (born 1986), British guitarist

== See also ==
- Joan Taylor (1929–2012), American television and film actress
