= Roadsongs =

Roadsongs may refer to:

- Roadsongs (Townes van Zandt album), 1993 album
- Roadsongs (The Derek Trucks Band album), 2010 live album

== See also ==
- Songs from the Road (disambiguation)
