= Songs from the Road (Joanne Shaw Taylor album) =

Live album by Joanne Shaw Taylor
- Released: 5 November 2013
- Recorded: 12 May 2013
- Venue: The Borderline (London, England)
- Genre: Blues rock; electric blues
- Length: 1:16:26 (album); 1:36:02 (video)
- Label: Ruf
- Producer: Jim Gaines

Joanne Shaw Taylor chronology
Almost Always Never (2012)	Songs from the Road (2013)	The Dirty Truth (2014)

Songs from the Road is the first live album and video by British blues rock musician Joanne Shaw Taylor. Released on 5 November 2013 by Ruf Records, it documents Taylor's performance at The Borderline in London on 12 May 2013. The live album was produced by Jim Gaines, who produced Taylor's first two studio albums White Sugar and Diamonds in the Dirt, while the video was produced by Uwe Treskatis. Songs from the Road reached number 37 on the UK Independent Albums Chart, number 6 on the UK Independent Album Breakers Chart and number 5 on the UK Jazz & Blues Albums Chart.

== Background ==
Songs from the Road documents Taylor's one-off performance at The Borderline in London on 12 May 2013, which was organised specifically with the intention of recording for a live release. According to the guitarist, fans had been urging her to make a live album for several years; in an interview with Blues Rock Review, she noted that "it was something that the fans had been asking for ... I think people tend to prefer live albums, I think they see them as a more accurate portrayal of what an artist does". Speaking about the arrangement of the show, Taylor explained that "We only had one chance to do it because of my schedule", adding that she purposely chose the Borderline for the performance due to its small size, which she hoped would allow for an intimate, "'everyone-packed-in-like-sardines' vibe". The live set contains songs from all three of Taylor's studio albums to date: White Sugar (2009), Diamonds in the Dirt (2010) and Almost Always Never (2012).

== Reception ==
Songs from the Road received generally positive reviews from critics. In a 9/10 review for Blues Rock Review, George Ward wrote that "Songs from the Road embodies the life and soul Taylor and band put into their music. It has the deep contrast of vibrancy and tenderness that sums up her career to date. It is a performance to be proud of." Pete Feenstra from Get Ready to Rock! gave the release four out of five stars, praising Taylor and her band's performances and explaining that "the set builds up an impressive momentum on the back of some smoking grooves, intense solos and fine band interplay".

== Track listing ==
All tracks are written by Joanne Shaw Taylor, except where noted.

Songs from the Road live album track listing
No.	Title	Writer(s)	Length
1.	"Soul Station"		5:56
2.	"Tied & Bound"		6:42
3.	"Beautifully Broken"		7:31
4.	"Watch 'Em Burn"		10:07
5.	"Diamonds in the Dirt"		6:51
6.	"Manic Depression" (The Jimi Hendrix Experience cover)	Jimi Hendrix	7:37
7.	"Jealousy"	Frankie Miller	7:10
8.	"Kiss the Ground Goodbye"		7:26
9.	"Just Another Word"		4:24
10.	"Band Introductions"		0:30
11.	"Jump That Train"		6:37
12.	"Going Home"		5:35
Total length:			1:16:26

Songs from the Road video track listing
No.	Title	Writer(s)	Length
1.	"Soul Station"		6:25
2.	"Tied & Bound"		6:41
3.	"Beautifully Broken"		6:39
4.	"Watch 'Em Burn"		10:04
5.	"Diamonds in the Dirt"		6:22
6.	"You Should Stay I Should Go"		4:19
7.	"Almost Always Never"		4:59
8.	"Jealousy"	Miller	7:27
9.	"Kiss the Ground Goodbye"		7:28
10.	"Just Another Word"		4:26
11.	"Let It Burn"		5:36
12.	"Time Has Come"		8:20
13.	"Jump That Train"		5:45
14.	"Lose Myself to Loving You"		6:46
15.	"Going Home"		5:55
Total length:			1:36:02

== Personnel ==
Musicians

- Joanne Shaw Taylor – lead vocals, guitar
- Joseph Veloz – bass, backing vocals
- Tony Dicello – drums, backing vocals
- Julian "Jools" Grudgings – keyboards

Additional personnel

- Jim Gaines – production, mixing
- Paul Kennedy – engineering
- Uwe Treskatis – video production, camera operation
- Christian Hennicke – camera operation
- Frank von Kiedrowski – camera operation
- Johannes Dominik Weber – camera operation
- DMX Productions – visual design

== Charts ==
Chart performance for Songs from the Road
Chart (2013)	Peak position
UK Independent Albums (OCC)	37
UK Independent Album Breakers (OCC)	6
UK Jazz & Blues Albums (OCC)	5
