= Corinth and Counce Railroad =

Former Class III railroad in the United States

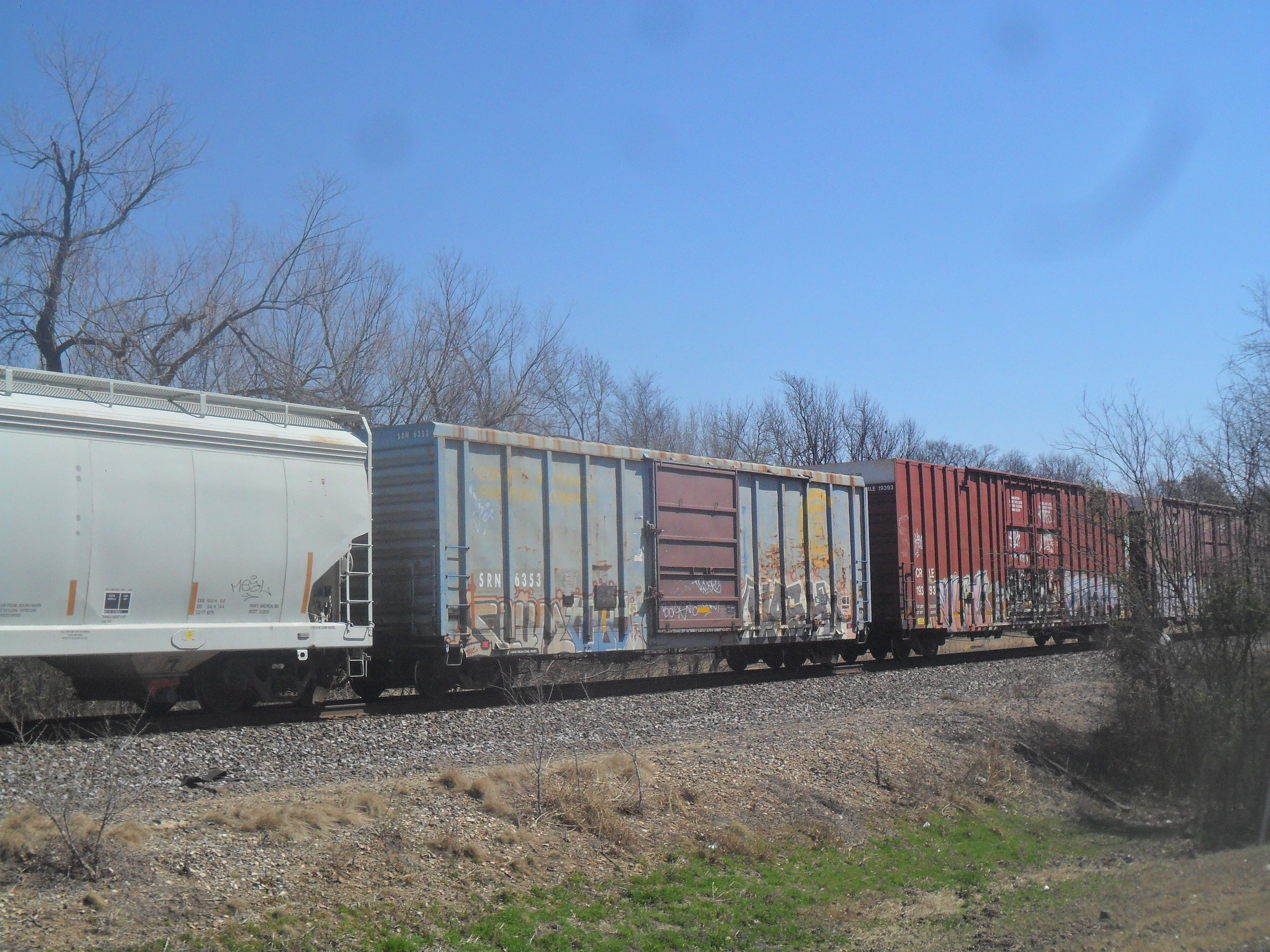
- Former Corinth and Counce box car, on a BNSF freight in Norman, Oklahoma, on March 15, 2018.

Overview
- Headquarters: Counce, Tennessee
- Reporting mark: CCR
- Locale: Mississippi, Tennessee
- Dates of operation: 1959–1991
- Successor: Kansas City Southern

Technical
- Track gauge: 4 ft 8 1/2 in (1,435 mm) standard gauge
- Length: 16.15 miles

The Corinth and Counce Railroad was a Class III railroad operating freight service between Mississippi and Tennessee. The line was built in 1959, expanded in 1974 and sold in 1991 to a new owner who changed the railroad's name. Today, some of the Corinth and Counce's trackage is operated by the Kansas City Southern Railway.

== History ==
On November 26, 1958, the Corinth and Counce Railroad Company was incorporated to build a new, 16.15-mile (25.99 km) line of railroad between Corinth, Mississippi, where it connected with the Illinois Central Gulf Railroad and the Southern Railway, and Counce, Tennessee.

The Corinth and Counce began operations on September 1, 1959. The company's corporate offices were located in Counce, while there were engine houses in both Counce and Corinth.

The Packaging Corporation of America acquired control of the Corinth and Counce on February 27, 1970.

On August 12, 1974, the Interstate Commerce Commission and the Tennessee Valley Authority authorized the railroad to begin operations over a 10-mile branch line between Sharp, Mississippi and Yellow Creek, Mississippi.

By the 1970s, the railroad's traffic included lumber, pulp, paper products, coiled steel and steel pipe.

On December 31, 1991, the Corinth and Counce was sold to the MidSouth Rail Corporation, which changed the railroad's name to Tennrail. On January 1, 1994, Tennrail was merged into the Kansas City Southern Railway.
