= Mascotte =

Mascotte may refer to:

- Mascotte (rolling papers), a Dutch company manufacturing rolling papers
- Mascotte, Florida, a small city in the United States
- Mascotte (1920 film), a German silent film
- Mascotte (1930 film), a Polish film
- SS Mascotte, a steamship from the United States
- La mascotte, an Opéra comique by Edmond Audran

== See also ==
- Mascot (disambiguation)
