= Hunting Quarters =

Hunting Quarters is the original name for the area of eastern North Carolina in Carteret County currently known as the towns of Sea Level and Atlantic. The region, originally settled by an English family in the early 18th century, was named Hunting Quarters by the local Coree Indians, living on the plentiful game, fish and oysters.

== History ==
Some of King Charles II "Lords Proprietors", Sir George Carteret being one of many, had advertised in England offering 50 acres (200,000 m^{2}) of land to the provider of passage for each colonist brought to North Carolina. Thus, on October 28, 1702, Captain John Nelson, owner and operator of his own ship filed what was called an "Entry to Land" which gave him title to six hundred acres of land in what is now Sea Level, Carteret County, North Carolina. In order to keep his land he was required to occupy and use the land or it would be forfeited, thus "Hunting Quarters Plantions" was born. Captain John and his wife Ann Bell, daughter of Joseph Bell and Margaret, acquired large tracts of land on the north and south side of the Neuse River where they raised their children. They planted a number of orchards on the plantations and well as the usual crops. They remained active with the sea as well. The main plantation was on the north side of the Neuse River and a smaller plantation was on the south side near the present day site of Garbacon Creek. He owned property in Craven, Carteret (Hunting Quarters, Sea Level, Merrimon, Adams Creek and on Core Banks) and Hyde Counties.

When their son Thomas died in 1750 leaving his wife and two sons, Thomas Jr. and John, Captain John transferred 540 acres (2.2 km^{2}) to the boys, appointing his son James as overseer and instructing him that the widow Elizabeth was to receive one-third of the profits of the orchards and the grounds for her lifetime. When young Thomas Jr. became of age in 1759, he gave his younger brother John 450 acres (1.8 km^{2}) of this area as well as 120 acres (0.49 km^{2}) in Hunting Quarters for "his better maintenance and livelyhood". It appears that John married and died in his forties. Thomas Jr. died after 1800 and had apparently built a very good shipping business with his ship the "Hunter", as well as having a very prosperous plantation. After Ann died, Captain John married Mary Lewis Taylor. He provided for Mary by giving her a slave and rights to one-half of his Hunting Quarters property for her lifetime. They had no children but Mary had three from an earlier marriage. John died in 1760 and Mary in 1799.
