= Songs from the Road =

Songs from the Road may refer to:

- Songs from the Road (Jeff Healey album), 2009
- Songs from the Road (Joanne Shaw Taylor album), 2012
- Songs from the Road (Leonard Cohen album), 2010
- Songs from the Road, a re-release of the 2009 album and concert DVD Seven Moons Live by Jack Bruce and Robin Trower
