= Modular Approach to Software Construction Operation and Test =

The Modular Approach to Software Construction Operation and Test (MASCOT) is a software engineering methodology developed under the auspices of the United Kingdom Ministry of Defence starting in the early 1970s at the Royal Radar Establishment and continuing its evolution over the next twenty years. The co-originators of MASCOT were Hugo Simpson and Ken Jackson (currently with Telelogic).

Where most methodologies tend to concentrate on bringing rigour and structure to a software project's functional aspects, MASCOT's primary purpose is to emphasise the architectural aspects of a project. Its creators purposely avoided saying anything about the functionality of the software being developed, and concentrated on the real-time control and interface definitions between concurrently running processes.

MASCOT was successfully used in a number of defence systems, most notably the Rapier ground-to-air missile system of the British Army. Although still in use on systems in the field, it never reached critical success and has been subsequently overshadowed by object oriented design methodologies based on UML.

A British Standards Institution (BSI) standard was drafted for version 3 of the methodology, but was never ratified. Copies of the draft standard can be still obtained from the BSI.

== MASCOT in the field ==
The UK Ministry of Defence has been the primary user of the MASCOT method through its application in significant military systems, and at one stage mandated its use for new operational systems. Examples include the Rapier missile system, and various Royal Navy Command & Control Systems.

== The Future of the Method ==
MASCOT's principles continue to evolve in the academic community (principally at the DCSC) and the aerospace industry Matra BAe Dynamics, through research into temporal aspects of software design and the expression of system architectures, most notably in the DORIS (Data-Oriented Requirements Implementation Scheme) method and implementation protocols. Work has also included combining UML and DORIS to provide a richer means of describing complex real-time systems (Computer Science Research Institute).
