= Ethelsville, Alabama =

- Town
- Location of Ethelsville in Pickens County, Alabama.
- Coordinates: 33°24′51″N 88°12′58″W
- Country: United States
- State: Alabama
- County: Pickens

Area
  - Total: 0.57 sq mi (1.47 km^{2})
  - Land: 0.57 sq mi (1.47 km^{2})
  - Water: 0 sq mi (0.00 km^{2})
- Elevation: 348 ft (106 m)

Population (2020)
  - Total: 49
  - Density: 86.4/sq mi (33.36/km^{2})
- Time zone: UTC-6 (Central (CST))
  - Summer (DST): UTC-5 (CDT)
- ZIP code: 35461
- Area codes: 205, 659
- FIPS code: 01-24472
- GNIS feature ID: 2406465

Ethelsville is a town in northwest Pickens County, Alabama, United States.

As of the 2020 census, Ethelsville had a population of 49.

== History ==
Originally it name named Yorkville. It took its current name from Ethel Burgin Hancock, the daughter of local physician J. T. Hancock. His son Thomas was the town's first postmaster. The town was incorporated in 1952 or 1956, depending on the source, and at the time was still an active railroad stop, with four freight trains and six passenger trains stopping there daily. When the railroad discontinued stops in Ethelsville, the population began to decline. In 1843, local resident John H. Alexander discovered a shield and pair of copper scales while plowing his fields. The shield was engraved with the word "Hispana," which most historians have recognized as evidence that Spanish explorer Hernando de Soto likely passed through Pickens County. Local legend claims that De Soto and his men spent a winter on the hill where Ethelsville Baptist Church stands.

The town was moved one half mile from its original site when the M & O railroad was built in 1898.

== Geography ==
According to the U.S. Census Bureau, the town has a total area of 0.6 square miles (1.6 km^{2}), all land.

== Demographics ==
Historical population
Census	Pop.	Note	%±
1960	62		—
1970	98		58.1%
1980	95		−3.1%
1990	52		−45.3%
2000	81		55.8%
2010	81		0.0%
2020	49		−39.5%
U.S. Decennial Census

=== Racial and ethnic composition ===
Ethelsville town, Alabama – Racial and ethnic composition Note: the US Census treats Hispanic/Latino as an ethnic category. This table excludes Latinos from the racial categories and assigns them to a separate category. Hispanics/Latinos may be of any race.
Race / Ethnicity (NH = Non-Hispanic)	Pop 2000	Pop 2010	Pop 2020	% 2000	% 2010	% 2020
White alone (NH)	70	60	42	86.42%	74.07%	85.71%
Black or African American alone (NH)	11	21	4	13.58%	25.93%	8.16%
Native American or Alaska Native alone (NH)	0	0	0	0.00%	0.00%	0.00%
Asian alone (NH)	0	0	3	0.00%	0.00%	6.12%
Native Hawaiian or Pacific Islander alone (NH)	0	0	0	0.00%	0.00%	0.00%
Other race alone (NH)	0	0	0	0.00%	0.00%	0.00%
Mixed race or Multiracial (NH)	0	0	0	0.00%	0.00%	0.00%
Hispanic or Latino (any race)	0	0	0	0.00%	0.00%	0.00%
Total	81	81	49	100.00%	100.00%	100.00%

=== 2020 census ===
As of the 2020 United States census, there were 49 people, 52 households, and 42 families residing in the town.

=== 2010 census ===
As of the 2010 census, there were 81 people, 37 households, and 23 families living in the town. The population density was 143.2 inhabitants per square mile (55.3/km^{2}). There were 43 housing units at an average density of 76.0 per square mile (29.3/km^{2}). The racial makeup of the town was 74.07% White and 25.93% Black or African American.

As of 2019, children under the age of 18 represented 36.6% of the population while 8.9% of residents were aged 65 or older. The median age of Ethelsville was 24.6 years old as compared to the 38.1 year-old median age of the United States. 4.1% of Ethelsvillians were veterans and 21.6% of its residents spoke a language other than English at home.

Of its residents, 54.8% had graduated high school or received an equivalent degree, while 9.5% each had acquired an associate degree and bachelor's degree. Ethelsville residents commuted an average of 18 minutes to work, compared to the national average of 26.9 minutes. 79.6% of its residents drove alone to work, while 14.8% walked and 5.6% worked from home.

Household median income for Ethelsville's 59 housing units in 2019 was $39,167. The median income for a woman in the town was $35,156 in 2019, while the national average for women was $43,022. Males made far less, earning an average of just $23,750 annually. A full 51.3% of its residents lived below the poverty line. As of 2019, only 44.6% of its residents were employed.
