= Sea Level, North Carolina =

Unincorporated community in North Carolina, U.S.

Sea Level Sealevel
- Unincorporated community
- Welcome to Sea Level, on Sunny Shores

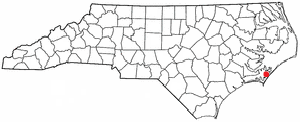
- Location within the U.S. state of North Carolina
- Coordinates: 34.86°N 76.38°W
- Country: United States
- State: North Carolina
- County: Carteret
- Named for: Its extremely low elevation
- Elevation: 4 ft (1.2 m)
- Time zone: UTC-5 (EST)
  - Summer (DST): UTC-4 (EDT)
- ZIP Code: 28577
- Area code: 252

Sea Level, also spelled Sealevel, is an unincorporated community in Carteret County, North Carolina, United States.

== Geography ==
Sea Level is located in northeastern Carteret County. The community is adjacent to Core Sound. It is located in what was known to early settlers as Hunting Quarters.

Sea Level has one of the lowest elevations in North Carolina; it is estimated that approximately 75 percent of the community floods when hurricanes pass through.

The elevation of the community is 4 ft (1 m).

Sea Level is within the Sea Level Township in Carteret County.

The ZIP Code for Sea Level is 28577.

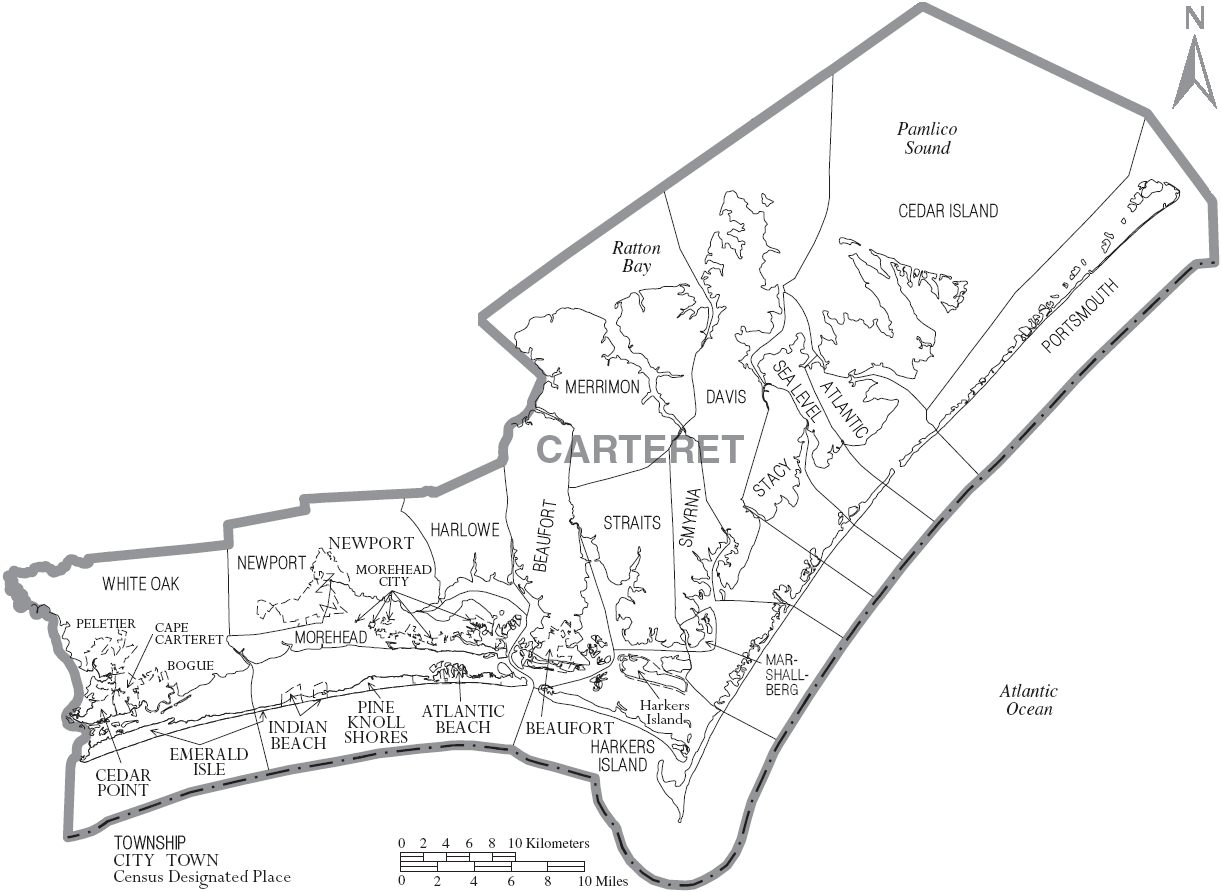
Map of Carteret County with municipal and township labels

== Transportation ==
US 70 is the major thoroughfare through the community. The southern terminus of NC 12 is in Sea Level.

== References and external links ==
- Sea Level Hurricane Data and History

Specific
