= Almost Always Never =

Studio album by Joanne Shaw Taylor
- Released: 17 September 2012
- Studio: Radio Milk (Austin, Texas)
- Genre: Blues rock; electric blues
- Length: 64:24
- Label: Ruf
- Producer: Mike McCarthy

Joanne Shaw Taylor chronology
Diamonds in the Dirt (2010)	Almost Always Never (2012)	Songs from the Road (2013)

Almost Always Never is the third studio album by British blues rock musician Joanne Shaw Taylor. Recorded at Radio Milk in Austin, Texas with producer Mike McCarthy, it was released on 17 September 2012 by Ruf Records. The album reached number 20 on the UK Independent Albums Chart and was Taylor's first album to top the UK Jazz & Blues Albums Chart.

== Background ==
After recording both White Sugar and Diamonds in the Dirt in Tennessee with Jim Gaines, Joanne Shaw Taylor worked with a new producer for the first time in her career on Almost Always Never, recording in Austin, Texas with Mike McCarthy. Speaking about working with McCarthy, Taylor stated: "He pushed me out of my comfort zone, while allowing me to explore and embrace new territories whilst remaining true to who I am." The album also marks a change in rhythm section, featuring bassist Billy White, drummer J. J. Johnson and keyboardist David Garza. In an interview with Guitar Girl magazine, Taylor reflected more on the production process for Almost Always Never, commenting: "I think it was hugely beneficial to mix things up on this recording. If for nothing else, I think mentally it pushed me out of my comfort zone and forced me to consider new techniques, sounds, etc., and, in particular, I found myself writing a lot more diverse material."

== Reception ==
Professional ratings
Review scores
Source	Rating
AllMusic	3/5 stars
Blues Rock Review	9/10
Premier Guitar	4/5 stars

Media response to Almost Always Never was generally positive. Reviewing the album for Premier Guitar, Andy Ellis gave the album a rating of four out of five – the same as he had done for Taylor's previous album, Diamonds in the Dirt. In his review, Ellis recognised the change in producer and backing musicians, suggesting that "her music reflects this change" by claiming that "While her riffs still have a bluesy spark, her songs are longer and feature extended solos with a more exploratory vibe." The writer concluded his overview by praising Taylor's "gritty voice" and her developing songwriting. Tyler Quiring of the website Blues Rock Review called Almost Always Never "an experience, and a powerful one at that".

In a review published by website AllMusic, critic j. poet praised Taylor on Almost Always Never for her "gritty and soulful" vocals, "impressive" guitar playing and range of different styles on display. Later in the review, however, the writer lamented that "The lyrics are the album's only weakness," claiming that "Taylor's words are laden with clichés and awkward descriptions of dead-end relationships. Her powerful vocals and anguished pyrotechnics convey a world of pain and betrayal that her lyrics don't ever quite capture."

== Track listing ==
All tracks are written by Joanne Shaw Taylor, except where noted.

Almost Always Never track listing
No.	Title	Writer(s)	Length
1.	"Soul Station"		6:15
2.	"Beautifully Broken"		5:47
3.	"You Should Stay, I Should Go"		4:08
4.	"Piece of the Sky"	Taylor; Kevin Bowe	3:50
5.	"Army of One"		5:15
6.	"Jealousy" (Frankie Miller cover)	Frankie Miller	6:49
7.	"Almost Always Never"		3:50
8.	"Tied & Bound"		6:10
9.	"A Hand in Love"		3:38
10.	"Standing to Fall"		6:47
11.	"Maybe Tomorrow"		6:31
12.	"Lose Myself to Loving You"		5:24

== Personnel ==
Musicians

- Joanne Shaw Taylor – vocals, guitar, piano on tracks 4 and 12
- Billy White – bass, slide guitar
- J. J. Johnson – drums
- David Garza – keyboards, piano, synthesisers, mandolin

Additional personnel

- Mike McCarthy – production, engineering, mixing
- Jim Vollentine – additional engineering
- Howie Weinberg – mastering
- Dan Gerbarg – mastering
- Michael Van Merwyk – artwork
- Shervin Lainez – photography

== Charts ==
Chart performance for Almost Always Never
Chart (2012)	Peak position
UK Independent Albums (OCC)	20
UK Independent Album Breakers (OCC)	1
UK Jazz & Blues Albums (OCC)	1
