= Diamonds in the Dirt =

Studio album by Joanne Shaw Taylor
- Released: 11 October 2010
- Studio: Bessie Blue Studios (Counce, Tennessee)
- Genre: Blues rock; electric blues
- Length: 45:16
- Label: Ruf
- Producer: Jim Gaines

Joanne Shaw Taylor chronology
White Sugar (2009)	Diamonds in the Dirt (2010)	Almost Always Never (2012)

Diamonds in the Dirt is the second studio album by British blues rock musician Joanne Shaw Taylor. Recorded at Bessie Blue Studios in Counce, Tennessee with producer Jim Gaines, it was released on 11 October 2010 by Ruf Records. The album reached number 34 on the UK Independent Albums Chart and number 13 on the UK Jazz & Blues Albums Chart.

== Reception ==
Professional ratings
Review scores
Source	Rating
AllMusic	3.5/5 stars
Classic Rock	4/5 stars
Premier Guitar	4/5 stars

Media response to Diamonds in the Dirt was largely positive. Classic Rock writer Henry Yates described the album as "largely triumphant" and suggested that "the sense of ambition on Diamonds in the Dirt comes through loud and clear". David McGee of The Absolute Sound praised Taylor's second album as "a great leap forward" and hailed it as "proof anew that far from being moribund the genre is in fact being revitalized by a younger generation of artists". Premier Guitar writer Andy Ellis noted the improvement on Diamonds in the Dirt compared to its predecessor White Sugar, claiming that on the album, "Taylor brings a new authority to her playing, songwriting, and smoky vocals".

Reviewing the album for the website AllMusic, William Ruhlmann had a more mixed view, praising the album generally but claiming that on Diamonds in the Dirt, "Taylor comes off as a talented, if unfinished, young blues artist," adding that "Taylor's limitations are really just those of youth, so maybe it is better to focus on her strengths as a player, which come across as soon as she puts her fingers on her instrument." Both Ruhlmann and Yates (of Classic Rock) criticised the production work of Jim Gaines, with the latter claiming that "Taylor's sultry vocals are occasionally sunk a little low in Jim Gaines's mix, with the effect that certain lines ... are allowed to slip by as murmured asides".

== Track listing ==
All tracks are written by Joanne Shaw Taylor.

Diamonds in the Dirt track listing
No.	Title	Length
1.	"Can't Keep Living Like This"	5:12
2.	"Dead and Gone"	4:07
3.	"Same as It Never Was"	4:54
4.	"Jump That Train"	4:50
5.	"Who Do You Love?"	3:07
6.	"Diamonds in the Dirt"	5:07
7.	"Let It Burn"	4:30
8.	"World on Fire"	3:52
9.	"Lord Have Mercy"	4:40
10.	"The World and It's [sic] Way"	4:57

== Personnel ==
Musicians

- Joanne Shaw Taylor – vocals, guitar
- David Smith – bass
- Steve Potts – drums
- Rick Steff – keyboards

Additional personnel

- Jim Gaines – production, mixing
- Tobias Nöthen – mastering
- Marko Von Konow – artwork
- Liz Mackinder – photography

== Charts ==
Chart performance for Diamonds in the Dirt
Chart (2010)	Peak position
UK Independent Albums (OCC)	34
UK Independent Album Breakers (OCC)	5
UK Jazz & Blues Albums (OCC)	13
