= Joanne Shaw Taylor =

English blues rock singer and guitarist (born 1985)

- Taylor in July 2017

Background information
- Born: February 1985 (age 41); Wednesbury, West Midlands, England
- Genre: Blues rock
- Occupations: Guitarist, singer
- Instruments: Vocals, guitar
- Years active: 2002–present
- Labels: Silvertone, Sony Music, Ruf, Keeping the Blues Alive
- Website: www.joanneshawtaylor.com

Joanne Shaw Taylor (born 1985, England) is an English singer and guitarist. She was discovered by Dave Stewart of Eurythmics at the age of 16.

Taylor's albums via Ruf Records, White Sugar (2009) and Diamonds in the Dirt (2010), peaked at No. 8 in the US on the Billboard Top Blues Albums chart. Her No. 1 album, The Blues Album (2021), was released via Joe Bonamassa's Keeping the Blues Alive Records.

In 2010, Taylor won Best Female Vocalist at the British Blues Awards. She won the same award at the 2011 British Blues Awards, and the Songwriter of the Year award for "Same as It Never Was", from Diamonds in the Dirt.

== Early life ==
Taylor was born in Wednesbury, West Midlands, England. She grew up in Solihull and was inspired in her early teens to play the blues after hearing Stevie Ray Vaughan, Albert Collins and Jimi Hendrix. Dave Stewart heard Taylor play and invited her to join his supergroup, D.U.P., on tour in Europe during 2002.

== Music career ==
In May 2009, Taylor released her debut album, White Sugar, via Ruf Records. Taylor's second album was 2010's Diamonds in the Dirt, also on Ruf Records. Both albums peaked at No. 8 in the US, on the Billboard Top Blues Albums chart. In 2010, she won Best Female Vocalist at the British Blues Awards. She won the same award at the 2011 British Blues Awards, and the Songwriter of the Year award for "Same as It Never Was", from Diamonds in the Dirt.

On 4 June 2012, Taylor played lead guitar in Annie Lennox's band at the Diamond Jubilee Concert in London. Taylor played an extended solo during the performance in front of Buckingham Palace, attended by approximately 12,000 people (not counting the many thousands lining The Mall). Just before her solo spot, Taylor's Fuzz Face pedal malfunctioned, leaving a much cleaner guitar sound than usual. However, this apparent misfortune was ameliorated when she was informed that Stevie Wonder had loved her "clean, bluesy, understated tone".

Taylor's fourth studio album, The Dirty Truth, was recorded in Memphis, Tennessee (with producer Jim Gaines). It was released on 22 September 2014. Taylor's fifth studio album, Wild, was released on 30 September 2016. It was recorded in Nashville's Grand Victor Sound Studios, with Kevin Shirley as the producer. The album became her first Top 20 entry in the UK Albums Chart.

In 2018, Taylor signed her first major label contract with Sony Music on their imprint, Silvertone Records. She supported Foreigner at Birmingham's Symphony Hall on 15 May 2018, and at the Royal Albert Hall on 16 May. Following her own headline tour in 2017, Taylor completed a four-week tour around the United States, and returned to the UK in late 2018 to play intimate venues around the country. Taylor's sixth album, Reckless Heart, was released on 15 March 2019 in the UK and Europe. It was later released on 17 May in the US.

In 2021, Taylor released the charting single "If That Ain't a Reason", from the No. 1 The Blues Album via Keeping the Blues Alive Records. Produced by Joe Bonamassa, Taylor released Blues from the Heart: Live in 2022. Her single and music video for "Can't You See What You're Doing to Me" features Kenny Wayne Shepherd.

== Equipment ==
=== Guitars ===
Taylor primarily uses Fender Telecaster electric guitars, although she also uses a Gibson Les Paul. She has also said she likes Fender Stratocasters for rhythm guitar work. She acquired her main Telecaster, nicknamed 'Junior', at the age of 15. It is a modified 1966 Esquire model purchased secondhand in Denmark Street, London, which has had a Fender Jazz humbucker neck pickup added (in addition to the factory bridge pickup). Additionally, she uses a Fender Albert Collins signature model Telecaster, which was a gift from Joe Bonamassa.

Taylor uses Ernie Ball Slinky top/heavy bottom strings, and usually tunes the guitar to E♭.

=== Amps ===
Taylor uses a Bletchley Belchfire 45 with a Marshall cabinet for a heavier sound, and a 1970s Fender Pro Reverb for a cleaner sound.

=== Pedals ===
Taylor mainly uses one or two Ibanez Tube Screamer pedals, along with a Holy Grail reverb. On some tracks, she also uses a Vibe Machine for a vibrato effect.

== Discography ==
Studio albums

- White Sugar (2009)
- Diamonds in the Dirt (2010)
- Almost Always Never (2012)
- The Dirty Truth (2014)
- Wild (2016)
- Reckless Heart (2019)
- The Blues Album (2021)
- Nobody's Fool (2022)
- Heavy Soul (2024)
- Black & Gold (2025)
- The Trouble With Love (2026)

== See also ==
- List of British blues musicians
