= White Sugar (album) =

Studio album by Joanne Shaw Taylor
- Released: 23 February 2009
- Studio: Bessie Blue Studios (Counce, Tennessee)
- Genre: Blues rock; electric blues
- Length: 51:38
- Label: Ruf
- Producer: Jim Gaines

Joanne Shaw Taylor chronology
White Sugar (2009)	Diamonds in the Dirt (2010)

White Sugar is the debut studio album by British blues rock musician Joanne Shaw Taylor. Recorded at Bessie Blue Studios in Counce, Tennessee with producer Jim Gaines, it was released on 23 February 2009 by Ruf Records. The album reached number 36 on the UK Independent Albums Chart and number 13 on the UK Jazz & Blues Albums Chart.

== Reception ==
Professional ratings
Review scores
Source	Rating
AllMusic	4/5 stars

Reviewing the album for the website AllMusic, Rick Anderson described White Sugar as "A spectacular debut from a major talent," praising Taylor's "fiery take on blues-based rock" which he likened to the styles of blues-rock pioneers such as Jimi Hendrix and Stevie Ray Vaughan. Anderson highlighted "Heavy Heart" as the best track on the album, hailing its "brilliant chord progression and sly bluebeat outro".

The album entered the UK Independent Albums Chart at number 36 and the UK Jazz & Blues Albums Chart at number 13. It remained in the top 30 of the latter chart for four weeks, while in the former chart it returned a few weeks after its initial debut at number 47. White Sugar later returned to the UK Jazz & Blues Albums Chart top 30 in October 2016, shortly after the release of Taylor's fifth studio album, Wild.

== Track listing ==
All tracks are written by Joanne Shaw Taylor, except where noted.

White Sugar track listing
No.	Title	Writer(s)	Length
1.	"Going Home"		4:50
2.	"Just Another Word"		4:07
3.	"Bones" (The Hoax cover)	Hugh Coltman; Jessie Davey; Jon Amor; Robin Davey	5:22
4.	"Who Do You Want Me to Be?"		3:35
5.	"Time Has Come"		5:51
6.	"White Sugar"		4:27
7.	"Kiss the Ground Goodbye"		4:40
8.	"Heavy Heart"		5:21
9.	"Watch 'Em Burn"		5:08
10.	"Blackest Day"		8:17

== Personnel ==
Musicians

- Joanne Shaw Taylor – vocals, guitar
- David Smith – bass
- Steve Potts – drums

Additional personnel

- Jim Gaines – production, mixing
- Uli Eisner – mastering
- Michael Van Merwyk – artwork
- Andreas Dahlmeier – photography

== Charts ==
Chart performance for White Sugar
Chart (2009)	Peak position
UK Independent Albums (OCC)	36
UK Jazz & Blues Albums (OCC)	13
