= Counce, Tennessee =

- Unincorporated community
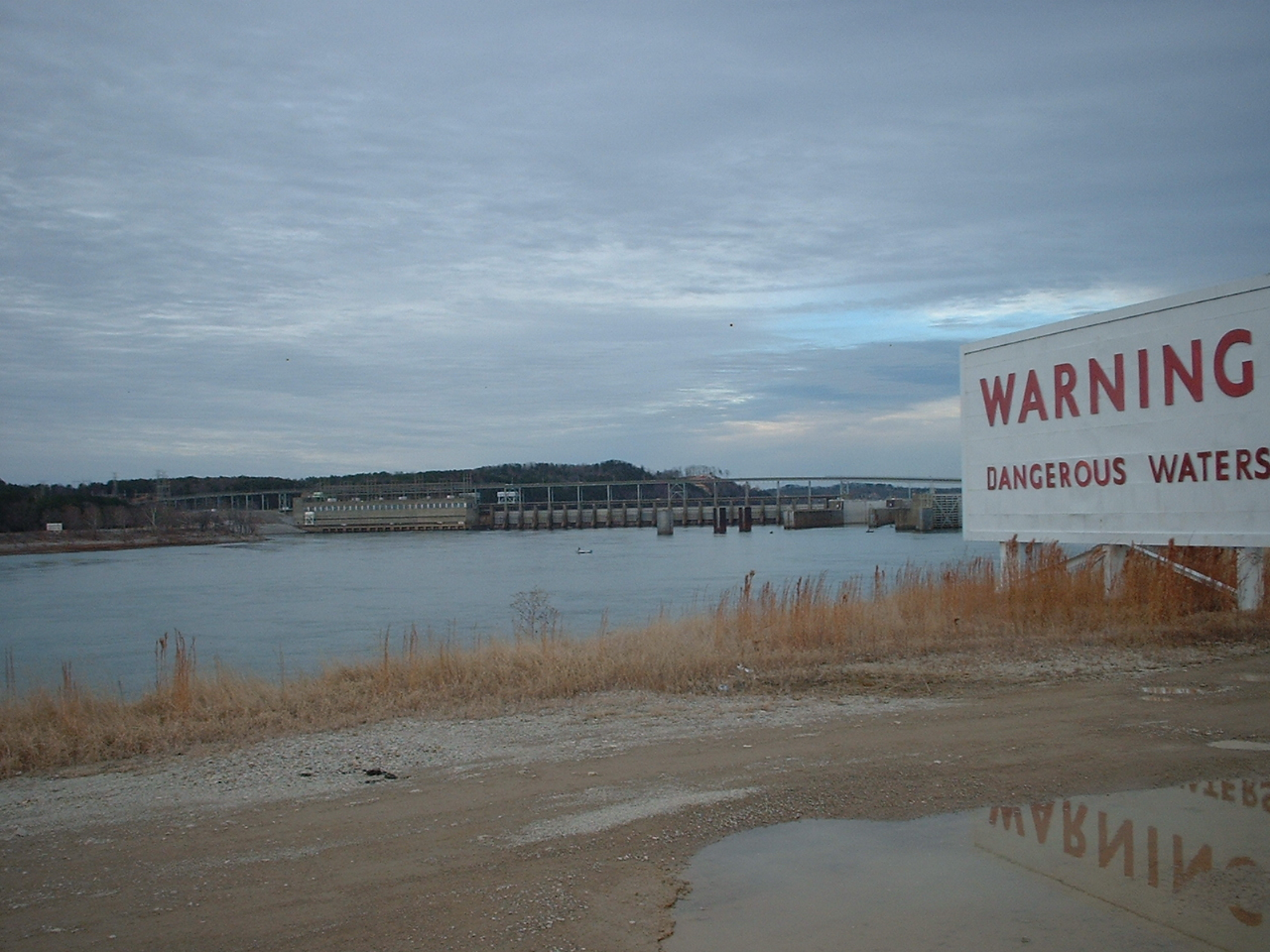
- Pickwick Landing Dam in Counce

- Location within Tennessee Location within the United States
- Coordinates: 35°02′32″N 88°16′24″W
- Country: United States
- State: Tennessee
- County: Hardin

Area
  - Total: 1.51 sq mi (3.92 km^{2})
  - Land: 1.51 sq mi (3.92 km^{2})
  - Water: 0 sq mi (0.00 km^{2})
- Elevation: 486 ft (148 m)

Population (2020)
  - Total: 316
  - Density: 209/sq mi (80.6/km^{2})
- Time zone: UTC-6 (Central (CST))
  - Summer (DST): UTC-5 (CDT)
- ZIP code: 38326
- Area code: 731
- GNIS feature ID: 1281377

Counce is an unincorporated community in Hardin County, Tennessee. Counce is located on Tennessee State Route 57 near the Mississippi border. The community is adjacent to the Tennessee River near the Pickwick Landing Dam. Counce is the terminus of a CPKC, ex Kansas City Southern line which was originally the Corinth and Counce Railroad and later became part of the MidSouth Rail Corporation before Kansas City Southern took over MidSouth. Counce was named after the Counce families, who were the first families to inhabit the community.

== Demographics ==
Historical population
Census	Pop.	Note	%±
2020	316		—
U.S. Decennial Census
