= Interstate 85 in Alabama =

Section of Interstate Highway in Alabama, United States

Interstate 85
- I-85 highlighted in red

Route information
- Maintained by ALDOT
- Length: 80.00 mi (128.75 km)
- NHS: Entire route

Major junctions
- South end: I-65 / US 82 in Montgomery
- US 80 / US 231 / SR 21 in Montgomery; SR 108 in Mt. Meigs; SR 81 near Tuskegee; US 29 in Auburn; US 280 / US 431 in Opelika; US 29 in Valley
- North end: I-85 at the Georgia state line in Lanett

Location
- Country: United States
- State: Alabama
- Counties: Montgomery, Macon, Lee, Chambers

Highway system
- Interstate Highway System; Main; Auxiliary; Suffixed; Business; Future; Alabama State Highway System; Interstate; US; State
← US 84	→ SR 85
← SR 107	AL 108	→ SR 109

Interstate 85 (I-85) is a part of the Interstate Highway System that runs from Montgomery, Alabama, to Petersburg, Virginia. In Alabama, the Interstate Highway runs 80 miles (130 km) from I-65 in Montgomery northeast to the Georgia state line near Valley. Although it is nominally north–south as it carries an odd number, I-85 travels east–west through the state. It is the primary highway between Montgomery and Atlanta. The Interstate also connects Montgomery with Tuskegee, Auburn, Opelika, and, indirectly, Phenix City and Columbus, Georgia.

== Route description ==
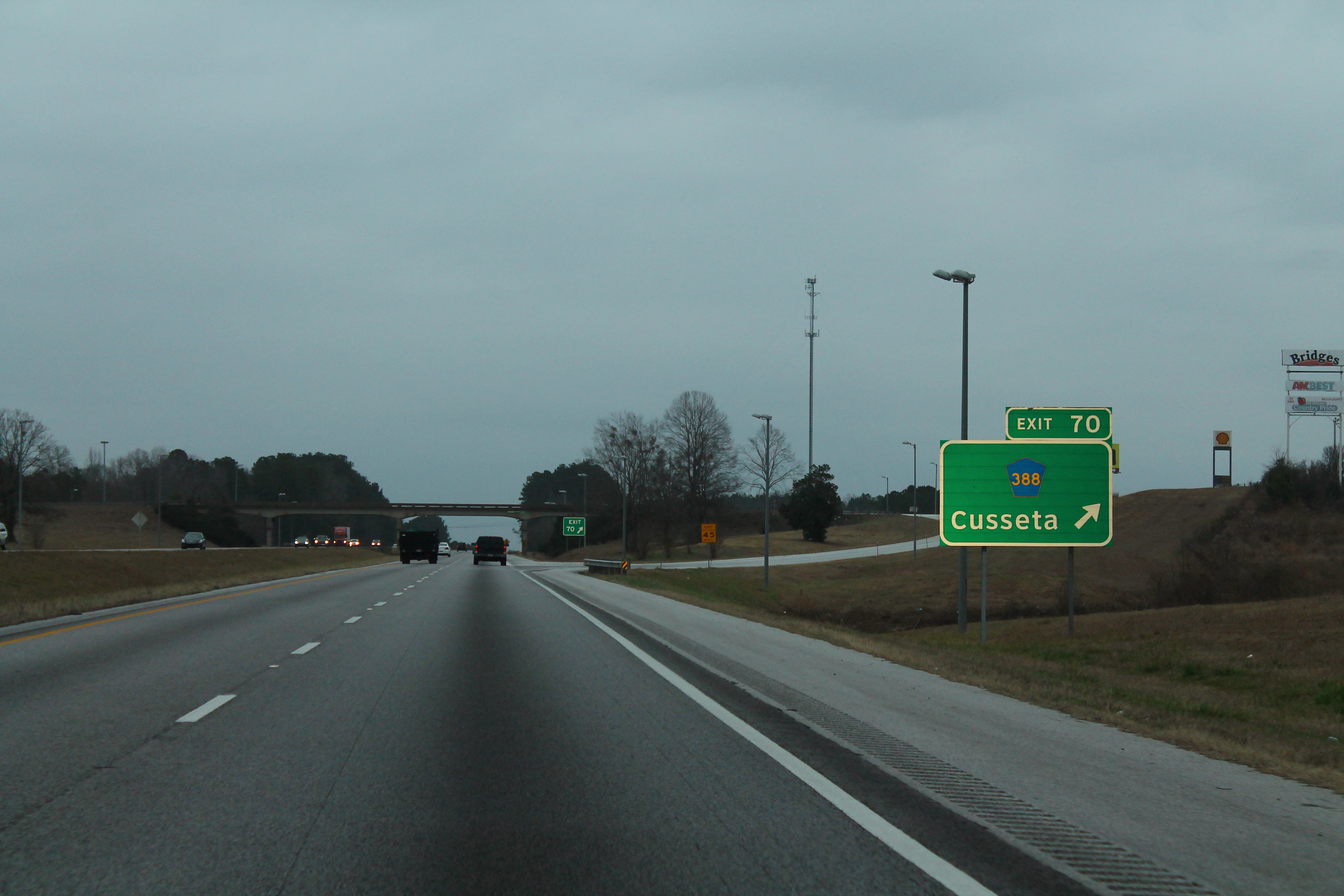
I-85 North exit 70 toward Cusseta

I-85 begins at a six-ramp modified directional T interchange with I-65 southwest of downtown Montgomery. In addition to the ramps to and from I-65, the terminating Interstate's dual carriageways continue west a short distance and become Day Street; the interchange also includes a ramp from southbound I-65 to Day Street and from Day Street to northbound I-65. I-85 heads east toward downtown Montgomery as an eight-lane freeway. The highway has a pair of half diamond interchanges with Court Street (northbound exit, southbound entrance) and Union Street (southbound exit, northbound entrance). The one-way pair of Arba Street and South Street serve as frontage roads for the northbound and southbound lanes, respectively, along the southern edge of downtown. The interchanges provide access to the Alabama State Capitol and Alabama State University. Southeast of downtown Montgomery, I-85 has a pair of half interchanges with Forest Avenue (northbound exit, southbound entrance) and Mulberry Street (southbound exit, northbound entrance).

I-85 leaves the core of Montgomery and has a diamond interchange with Ann Street and a six-ramp partial cloverleaf interchange with Perry Hill Road. The freeway's next junction is with East Boulevard, which forms part of a circumferential highway around Montgomery; the partial cloverleaf interchange includes a flyover ramp from northbound East Boulevard to southbound I-85. East Boulevard carries US Route 231 (US 231) and State Route 21 (SR 21) through the interchange and US 80 south from the interchange; US 80 joins I-85 heading east from Montgomery. I-85's interchange with SR 271 provides access to Auburn University at Montgomery. The Interstate drops to four lanes between SR 271 and the next interchange with SR 110 and SR 126 (Atlanta Highway), where the route leaves the city of Montgomery.

I-85 and US 80 parallel SR 126 east through the community of Mount Meigs and through an unused directional T interchange with SR 108, which is also future I-85. This is among the largest and tallest interchanges in the state, featuring SR 126 and SR 293 on both sides of the Interstate and freeway state route. US 80 splits east onto Atlanta Highway at a diamond interchange, and I-85 heads east-northeast, leaving Montgomery County and entering Macon County at Line Creek. Another access to US 80 is provided at Shorter via an interchange with unsigned SR 138. The Interstate meets the southern end of SR 229 south of SR 229's crossing of the Tallapoosa River and the southern end of SR 49 near the town of Franklin. I-85's interchange with SR 81 connects the freeway with the Macon County seat of Tuskegee and Tuskegee University. The Interstate's final access to US 80 is via SR 186 (Wire Road), beyond which the freeway passes through a portion of the Tuskegee National Forest.

I-85 continues northeast into Lee County. On the southern edge of Auburn, the freeway has an interchange with Auburn Technology Parkway. US 29 joins I-85 at its next interchange with College Street; SR 147 continues north along College Street toward Auburn University. I-85 and US 29 continue northeast through the city to an interchange with Bent Creek Road, which provides access to Auburn University Regional Airport. The freeway continues northeast into the city of Opelika, the county seat of Lee County. I-85 gains a second US Route concurrency at its four-ramp partial cloverleaf interchange with Gateway Drive, where US 280 joins from the north. The three highways cross over a Norfolk Southern Railway line just west of their four-ramp partial cloverleaf interchange with SR 51 and SR 169 south of downtown Opelika.

US 280 splits east toward Phenix City and Columbus at the next interchange with US 431. US 29 diverges from I-85 at the following interchange, and the Interstate leaves the city of Opelika beyond its junction with Andrews Road. The Interstate enters Chambers County at its interchange with County Road 388 (CR 388), which leads to Cusseta. I-85 meets CR 208 in the unincorporated area of Huguley west of the city of Valley. Southbound I-85 has a welcome center between CR 208 and the freeway's final interchange in Alabama, a junction with US 29 between the cities of Valley to the south and Lanett to the north. I-85 crosses the Chattahoochee River on its way toward LaGrange and Atlanta.

== History ==
The construction of the downtown part of the Interstate in Montgomery destroyed a significant part of the traditionally African-American community in that area.

== Future ==
=== Montgomery Outer Loop ===
State Route 108
- Location: Pike Road
- Length: 2 mi (3.2 km)
- Existed: January 25, 2016–present

Future Interstate 685
- Location: Montgomery
- Length: 14 mi (23 km)

An extension of I-85 is proposed west from Montgomery to interchange with I-20 and I-59 just east of the Mississippi–Alabama state line, where it will connect with I-20 and I-59 near Cuba. This extension will roughly follow the route of US 80, going through or bypassing Selma and Demopolis. The Federal Highway Administration (FHWA) approved the alignment on February 17, 2011, after the American Association of State Highway and Transportation Officials (AASHTO) approved at its Fall 2010 meeting in Biloxi, Mississippi. Also approved was the proposal to redesignate part of existing I-85 south and east of Montgomery to be bypassed as part of the extension of I-85 as I-685. I-85 will be rerouted onto the Montgomery Outer Loop, which will loop to the south and east of Montgomery and link up with US 80 west of Montgomery. Alabama has permission to cosign this part of I-85 as I-685 until the new alignment is built, but the state has chosen not to do so. This section has also envisioned by some as part of a proposed I-14.

The first segment of the Montgomery Outer Loop from Vaughn Road (SR 110) to I-85 opened to traffic on January 25, 2016, signed as SR 108. If this extension were to be completed, I-85 and I-20 would meet each other twice, and the extension of I-85 would run east–west. As of 2023, no construction has been started to extend SR 108 beyond Vaughn Road. After years of stagnation, area leaders began calling for the construction of phase II of the project, which would extend the roadway to US 231/US 82 near Pike Road. Pike Road Mayor Gordon Stone said the project is ready to move forward, but it cannot do so until it is approved for funding. Phase III of the project would further extend the route to I-65 near Hope Hull.

Exit list
The entire route is in Montgomery County.

Location	mi	km	Exit	Destinations	Notes
	0.00	0.00	13	US 231 / US 82 / SR 6	Proposed interchange
	9.82	15.80	22	SR 110 (Vaughn Road) – Pike Road, Montgomery	Eastbound exit and 2 westbound entrances; Current western terminus of the Montgomery Outer Loop
	11.82	19.02	—	I-685 west / I-85 east / US 80 – Montgomery, Atlanta	Semi-directional T interchange; eastern terminus of the Montgomery Outer Loop
1.000 mi = 1.609 km; 1.000 km = 0.621 mi

== Exit list ==
County	Location	mi	km	Exit	Destinations	Notes
Montgomery	Montgomery	0.000	0.000	0	I-65 / US 82 (SR 6) / Day Street west – Mobile, Birmingham	Southern terminus and signed as exit 0 (north) northbound, left 0A (south) & 0B (north) southbound; I-65 exit 171; no access from eastbound Day Street to southbound I-65 or from northbound I-65 to Day Street; future western terminus of I-685
Montgomery	Montgomery	0.790	1.271	1	Court Street	Northbound exit and southbound entrance
Montgomery	Montgomery	1.290	2.076	1	Union Street	Southbound exit and northbound entrance
Montgomery	Montgomery	2.130	3.428	2	Forest Avenue	Northbound exit and southbound entrance
Montgomery	Montgomery	2.320	3.734	2	Mulberry Street	Southbound exit and northbound entrance
Montgomery	Montgomery	3.004	4.834	3	Ann Street	
Montgomery	Montgomery	4.734	7.619	4	Perry Hill Road	
Montgomery	Montgomery	6.546	10.535	6	US 80 west (SR 8 west) / US 231 (SR 53) / SR 21 (East Boulevard)	Southern end of US 80 / SR 8 concurrency
Montgomery	Montgomery	9.037	14.544	9	SR 271 (Taylor Road) to US 231 (SR 53)	Auburn University at Montgomery
Montgomery	Montgomery	11.009	17.717	11	SR 110 / SR 126 (Atlanta Highway) – Mitylene, Mount Meigs	
Montgomery		14.440	23.239	15	Future I-85 south / SR 108 west – Pike Road	Future I-85 rerouting; future eastern terminus of I-685
Montgomery	Waugh	16.067	25.857	16	US 80 east (SR 8 east) / SR 126 – Mount Meigs, Waugh	Northern end of US 80 concurrency
Macon	Shorter	22.216	35.753	22	SR 138 to US 80 – Shorter	SR 138 is unsigned from I-85
Macon		26.058	41.936	26	SR 229 north – Tallassee	
Macon	Franklin	32.370	52.094	32	SR 49 north – Tuskegee, Franklin	
Macon	Tuskegee	38.818	62.472	38	SR 81 – Notasulga, Tuskegee	
Macon		42.311	68.093	42	SR 186 east (Wire Road) to US 80 – Auburn, Phenix City, Columbus	Tuskegee National Forest
Lee	Auburn	49.921	80.340	50	Auburn Technology Parkway – Auburn University	
Lee	Auburn	51.438	82.781	51	US 29 south (SR 15 south) / SR 147 (College Street) – Auburn	Southern end of US 29/SR 15 concurrency
Lee	Auburn	57.028	91.778	57	Bent Creek Road – Auburn, Auburn University Regional Airport, Auburn University	
Lee	Opelika	58.754	94.555	58	US 280 west (SR 38 west / Gateway Drive) – Opelika	Southern end of US 280/SR 38 concurrency
Lee	Opelika	60.773	97.805	60	SR 51 / SR 169 – Opelika, Hurtsboro	
Lee	Opelika	62.197	100.096	62	US 280 east (SR 38 east) / US 431 (SR 1) – Opelika, Phenix City	Northern end of US 280/SR 38 concurrency
Lee	Opelika	64.551	103.885	64	US 29 north (SR 15 north) – Opelika	Northern end of US 29/SR 15 concurrency
Lee		66.731	107.393	66	Andrews Road – To US 29, Opelika	
Chambers		70.394	113.288	70	CR 388 – Cusseta, LaFayette	
Chambers	Huguley	76.908	123.771	77	CR 208 (Fob James Drive / Phillips Road) – Valley, Lanett	
Chambers	Valley	79.365	127.726	79	US 29 (SR 15) – Lanett, Valley	
Chambers	Valley	80.008	128.760	—	I-85 north (SR 403) – Atlanta	Continuation into Georgia over the Chattahoochee River
1.000 mi = 1.609 km; 1.000 km = 0.621 mi: Concurrency terminus; Incomplete access

== See also ==
Interstate 85
Previous state: Terminus	Alabama	Next state: Georgia
