= Alabama State Route 49 =

State highway in Alabama, United States

State Route 49

Route information
- Maintained by ALDOT
- Length: 82.684 mi (133.067 km)
- Existed: 1940–present

Major junctions
- South end: I-85 in Franklin
- SR 14 near Tallassee; US 280 in Dadeville; SR 22 in New Site; SR 77 in Mellow Valley; SR 9 / SR 48 in Lineville
- North end: SR 281 in Cheaha State Park

Location
- Country: United States
- State: Alabama
- Counties: Macon, Tallapoosa, Clay, Cleburne

Highway system
- Alabama State Highway System; Interstate; US; State
← SR 48	→ SR 50

State Route 49 (SR 49) is an 82.684-mile-long (133.067 km) state highway in the central and eastern parts of the U.S. state of Alabama. The southern terminus of the highway is at an interchange with Interstate 85 (I-85) at Franklin in Macon County. The northern terminus of the highway is at an intersection with SR 281 east of Cheaha State Park in southern Cleburne County.

== Route description ==
Alabama State Route 49 has its northern terminus at Alabama State Route 281, which provides access to Cheaha State Park and Oxford. This junction is at about 1200 ft, 1200 ft below the highest point in the state (Mount Cheaha), just a few miles southwest. This junction is in Cleburne County, which the route spends less than a mile in.

Quickly descending down the mountain into rural Clay County, the route winds its way south through foothills to Lineville, where it junctions with Alabama State Route 9. A few miles south of Lineville is a two-mile concurrency with Alabama State Route 77.

Crossing into Tallapoosa County several miles later, the route crosses through Goldville before reaching New Site, the location of a mile-long concurrency with Alabama State Route 22. It then winds its way south through Jacksons' Gap and reaches Dadeville, the location of a mile-long concurrency with U.S. Route 280.

After weaving through rural Tallapoosa County for several more miles, the route crosses into Macon County, where it enters Franklin. It makes a left turn onto the right-of-way of County Road 36, which carries it to its southern terminus at Interstate 85. Travelers can access Auburn, Atlanta, Montgomery, and Tuskegee from this intersection.

== History ==
When SR 49 was formed in 1940, the highway traveled only from Tallassee to Dadeville. As a result of several northward extensions, by 1969 the highway extended to an intersection with US 78 near Heflin. In 1973, the highway was extended southward to its current terminus at I-85 in Macon County. When SR 281 was formed in 1995, the northernmost section of the route was truncated.

== Major intersections ==
County	Location	mi	km	Destinations	Notes
Macon	Franklin	0.000	0.000	CR 51 south – Tuskegee	South end of state maintenance
Macon	Franklin	0.120	0.193	I-85 – Atlanta, Montgomery	I-85 exit 32
Tallapoosa		9.006	14.494	SR 14 – Tallassee, Notasulga	
Tallapoosa	Reeltown	12.403	19.961	SR 120 east – Notasulga	Western terminus of SR 120
Tallapoosa	Walnut Hill	20.524	33.030	SR 50 – Martin Dam, Camp Hill	
Tallapoosa	Dadeville	30.170	48.554	US 280 east (SR 38) – Camp Hill	South end of US 280/SR 38 concurrency
Tallapoosa	Dadeville	31.328	50.418	US 280 west (SR 38) – Alexander City, Birmingham	North end of US 280/SR 38 concurrency
Tallapoosa	New Site	47.268	76.070	SR 22 west – Alexander City	South end of SR 22 concurrency
Tallapoosa	New Site	48.287	77.710	SR 22 east – Roanoke, Wadley	North end of SR 22 concurrency
Clay		60.234	96.937	SR 77 south – Wadley	South end of SR 77 concurrency
Clay		62.415	100.447	SR 77 north – Ashland	North end of SR 77 concurrency
Clay	Lineville	68.517	110.267	SR 9 – Heflin, Ashland	
Cleburne		82.684	133.067	SR 281 (Talladega Scenic Drive) – Cheaha State Park	Northern terminus
1.000 mi = 1.609 km; 1.000 km = 0.621 mi: Concurrency terminus
