= Alabama State Route 138 =

Highway in Alabama

State Route 138

Route information
- Maintained by ALDOT
- Length: 0.785 mi (1,263 m)

Major junctions
- West end: I-85 at Shorter
- East end: US 80 west of Tuskegee

Location
- Country: United States
- State: Alabama
- Counties: Macon

Highway system
- Alabama State Highway System; Interstate; US; State
← SR 137	→ SR 139

State Route 138 (SR 138) is a 0.785-mile-long (1.263 km) connecting route in Macon County, in the U.S. state of Alabama. The state highway connects Interstate 85 (I-85) with U.S. Route 80 (US 80) in the western part of the county. Victoryland, a greyhound track and now-closed casino are located immediately off I-85 at its exit with SR 138.

== Route description ==
SR 138 begins at exit 22 of I-85 in the western part of Macon County, around the town of Shorter. Southeast of the interchange, an unnamed road continues northwest and becomes an unpaved road about 900 feet (270 m) from this point. Heading east past the diamond interchange with I-85, numerous truck stops, gas stations, fast food restaurants, and small stores line the roadway. After its junction with County Road 28, the highway ends at an intersection with US 80 where US 80 eastbound continues where SR 138 ends.

SR 138 is not mentioned on the exit signs from I-85.

== Major intersections ==
The entire route is in Shorter, Macon County.

mi	km	Destinations	Notes
0.000	0.000	I-85 – Montgomery, Atlanta	Western terminus; I-85 exit 22
0.785	1.263	US 80 (SR 8) – Tuskegee, Montgomery	Eastern terminus
1.000 mi = 1.609 km; 1.000 km = 0.621 mi
