= Huguley =

Huguley may refer to:

- Huguley, Alabama, a census-designated place (CDP) and unincorporated community in Chambers County, Alabama, United States
- Jay Huguley (born 1966), American film, TV and theatre actor
