= KAUO =

KAUO may refer to:

- KAUO-LD, a low-power television station (channel 14, virtual 15) licensed to serve Amarillo, Texas, United States
- Auburn University Regional Airport (ICAO code KAUO)
- Kauō, the Hawaiian name for Laysan Island
