= Interstate construction during the Civil Rights Movement in Montgomery, Alabama =

The construction of Interstate 65 (I-65) and I-85 in Montgomery, Alabama, on the edge of the downtown area, took place in 1961. Built after what was called "the golden era of highway construction" in the United States, its planning and actual construction fit into an ongoing pattern of local and state governments "building elevated expressways through black districts" in many major American cities even at the height of the civil rights movement. In Montgomery, it is estimated that around 75% of the people forced to vacate their homes for the construction were of African American descent, and while it was argued that running the expressway through some poorer areas would decrease urban blight, others criticized what they saw as a blatant attempt to destroy traditionally African American neighborhood and forced the inhabitants to move to other parts of town, further removed from the center. Critics argue also that this project, as did other such projects, effectively strengthened or reinstated racial segregation.

== Placement of the highways ==
=== Affected community ===
The communities that existed prior to building I-85 were named Centennial Hill, Bel Air and The Bottoms. The houses in these communities were determined to be of very low value and each of the affected home owners, were given "$3,300" for their homes, which to them felt like a low amount. Eight days after the meeting George W. Curry, a black minister and head of a property owners' committee, gathered 1,150 signatures for a petition that was later sent in to the local, state, and federal highway officials. This was to show the number of people protesting against the amount of homes that were being destroyed, and provided an alternate route that would barely affect anyone's place of living and cost $30,000 less for the overall construction. He further went to claim that it was a way to force major African American leaders out of their homes and shut down 2 of the known African American churches that are in the area. There were 164 houses listed in "fair" to good" condition that were homes to African American middle class. These residents were doctors, teachers, coaches, and lawyers. Martin Luther King Jr.'s and Ralph Abernathy's home and church were also going to be affected by this construction and Ralph wrote a telegram to President John F. Kennedy stating "If this route is approved, it will destroy one of the best negro neighborhoods in the south and make for a hazardous condition near the local negro college, a high school, and an elementary school. The destruction of this neighborhood will only aid the segregationist in their attempt to make the negro vote as ineffective as possible." The placement also prevented students from attending their college classes due to no safe way to cross the highway in a timely manor. There were also other African American communities that were destroyed with the construction of I-65 as well. Even today, the interstates separate the West side of the community and prevents the minority community from building closer inwards. Rosa Parks Museum director Daniel Neil commented on how the tourists for the number one city in hotel reservations in Alabama do not have many of the shops and restaurants that were in the path. Even as of 2021, in the area Neil mentioned, there are no traditional supermarkets, Supercenters, fresh markets, wholesale clubs or mass merchandisers.

Where the Montgomery Improvement Association founding location, the original Mount Zion African Methodist Episcopal Church in Montgomery, Alabama, Carlton McClendon Furniture Co. were both abandoned. Croskery's porch had housing across the street but now faces only the interstate. Glass street with wooden Shotgun housing, Chilton Street and Minto street were all destroyed to make room for the interstate

As it was in many major cities in the U.S. at the time, most interstate construction was planned around going through the cheapest land available. Also, some plans had been laid out since 1939, based around the drivers for the most traveled areas. Construction didn't start until white flight had occurred, where a majority of this land was African American residences or businesses. These communities' not having a large effect on political planning of the routes made the plans even easier to follow through with. There were protests between Ann Street and the Interchange between the two interstates, but the Bus Boycott and Freedom Rides from the Civil Rights Movement were already occurring at the same time. The protests caused only minor delay due to Rex M. Whitton, Federal Highway Administrator, telling Samual Englehardt to "Let the dust settle for about six months and then proceed with construction of the project.

== Affected citizens ==
After construction was completed, C. B. Croskery, a member of the clergy who had lived on Stone Street since 1955, said in an interview: "They sent out a letter saying they wanted to pave the highway and next thing I knew, they were out there digging up a whole line of houses on the other side of the street".

Skip Jackson, a resident of Carlisle Street, recalled watching the start of construction when he was in Second Grade. "I can remember the day they brought the big earthmovers out there, We knew it was coming. When the people who owned their homes started to move, we knew that was coming. Just like any neighborhood that's poor, you don't argue. All it did for us was kill our neighborhood."

C. R. Williams said that he "was unaware of the state's planned route through his neighborhood." He had been told a year earlier that the interstate would run north of Oak Park instead.

== Original construction planning ==
According to the original plans the interstate was to travel through the downtown business district and have exits to several of the local industrial and business sites. I-65 is to pass through the city in a north to south direction and will start down in Mobile, Alabama at Interstate 10 and travel "northeasterly" via Evergreen and Greenville through Montgomery to Birmingham, Cullman, and Decatur into Tennessee and beyond. The north–south route planned will cross the southern bypass near the city sewerage treatment plant, then Fairview Avenue, at an interchange section east of the Barber Dairy plant, running parallel to Holt Street to its intersection with I-85 just southwest of the intersection of Holt and Day Streets. After crossing Bell Street the route crosses the railroad and the Alabama River and will have an interchange with the North Montgomery Belt route on the river peninsula before crossing Cobb's Ford Road west of the junction with Millbrook Road and crossing county line from Montgomery County into Autauga County. This section alone is estimated to cost around $17 million. I-85 is to start at an intersection of I-65, and continue from there to Auburn, Opelika, and Lanett and then to Atlanta and other eastern locations. Starting at the Day and Holt Street intersection with Interstate 65 and continuing eastward through the city, it is to run mostly parallel to Donaldson Street, crossing Virginia Avenue and following a line almost parallel to and just south of U.S. Highway 80.

== Newspaper coverage ==
Karl Portera at The Montgomery Advertiser labeled building the two interstates as having the potential to make the Montgomery area a "major metropolitan center of south-central Alabama".

Sam Engelardt stated "not only serve the communities traffic needs, but is a very important factor in shaping future municipal and economic growth in urban areas."

Construction had already started in rural Alabama for both routes, some already have pedestrians driving on the finished, but not connected roads. The finished interstates are expected to bring an estimated 50,000 vehicles or higher by 1975 daily. Bringing them directly through the center of the downtown business district and have access to several local industrial and business sites.
