= AUO =

AUO may refer to:

- AU Optronics
- Auburn-Opelika Robert G. Pitts Airport
