= Alabama State Route 271 =

State highway in Alabama, United States

State Route 271
- Taylor Road

Route information
- Maintained by ALDOT
- Length: 5.437 mi (8.750 km)
- Existed: 1986–present

Major junctions
- South end: US 82 / US 231 in Montgomery
- Future I-685 / I-85 in Montgomery
- North end: Taylor Road in Montgomery

Location
- Country: United States
- State: Alabama
- Counties: Montgomery

Highway system
- Alabama State Highway System; Interstate; US; State
← SR 269	→ SR 273

State Route 271 (SR 271) is a 6.5-mile-long (10.5 km) route that serves as a connection between U.S. Route 82/U.S. Route 231 (US 82/US 231) and Interstate 85 (I-85) in Montgomery, Alabama.

== Route description ==
SR 271 begins at the intersection of Troy Highway, which carries US 82 (SR 6) and US 231 (SR 53), and Taylor Road. The route heads north on Taylor Road, which is a divided, six-lane street. It passes through grassland dotted with residential neighborhoods until it intersects Vaughn Road. Between Vaughn Road and Interstate 85 (I-85), SR 271 serves as a major access road for the nearby housing developments and shopping centers. It intersects I-85 with a simple diamond interchange with an additional cloverleaf loop from northbound SR 271 to southbound I-85. North of I-85, Taylor Road becomes an undivided four-lane street. The SR 271 designation ends 0.5 miles (0.80 km) north of the I-85 interchange.

== Major intersections ==
The entire route is in Montgomery, Montgomery County.

mi	km	Destinations	Notes
0.000	0.000	US 82 / US 231 (Troy Highway/SR 6/SR 53) – Montgomery, Pike Road	Southern terminus
4.937	7.945	I-85 – Downtown, Atlanta	I-85 exit 9
5.437	8.750	Taylor Road	End of state maintenance; northern terminus; road continues north as Taylor Road to Atlanta Highway
1.000 mi = 1.609 km; 1.000 km = 0.621 mi
