= Little Texas, Alabama =

Unincorporated community in Alabama, United States

- Unincorporated community
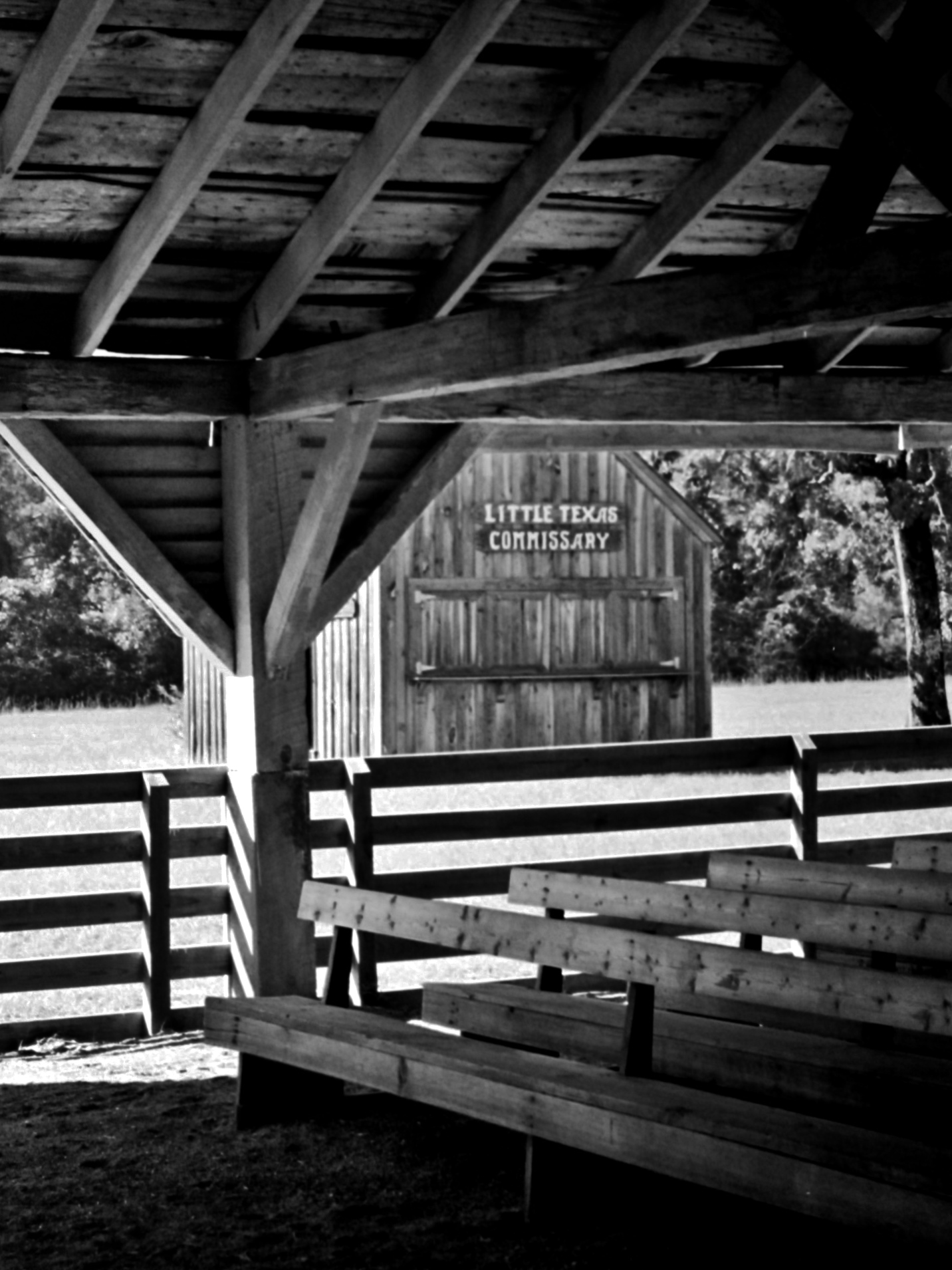
- The Little Texas Methodist Tabernacle and Campground was built by black and white settlers of the area. It has been the site of camp meetings since the 1850s.

- Location within Alabama Location within the United States
- Coordinates: 32°26′35″N 85°34′06″W
- Country: United States
- State: Alabama
- County: Macon
- Elevation: 535 ft (163 m)
- Time zone: UTC-6 (Central (CST))
  - Summer (DST): UTC-5 (CDT)
- Area code: 334

Little Texas is an unincorporated community in Macon County, Alabama, United States.
