= Hardaway, Alabama =

Unincorporated community in Alabama, United States

- Unincorporated community
- Location within Alabama Location within the United States
- Coordinates: 32°17′12″N 85°50′56″W
- Country: United States
- State: Alabama
- County: Macon
- Elevation: 253 ft (77 m)
- Time zone: UTC-6 (Central (CST))
  - Summer (DST): UTC-5 (CDT)
- ZIP code: 36039
- Area code: 334
- GNIS feature ID: 119711

Originally called Dick's Creek, the town received its name following the completion of the railroad by engineer and professor Col. Robert A. Hardaway (who lived in the community for some time with his family). Hardaway is an unincorporated community in Macon County, Alabama, United States, located 12.9 miles (20.8 km) southwest of Tuskegee. Hardaway has a post office with ZIP code 36039.

== Demographics ==
Historical population
Census	Pop.	Note	%±
1900	200		—
1910	300		50.0%
1920	310		3.3%
U.S. Decennial Census

From 1900 to 1920, Hardaway was listed as a village in 1900 & 1910 and as an incorporated town on the U.S. Census in 1920. It did not appear on the census after that point, likely due to disincorporation.

== Hardaway Baptist Church ==
Originally named Ebenezer Baptist Church, the church was constructed at a location near Hardaway Cemetery sometime prior to 1880. Sometime between the years 1889 and 1893 the church was moved to where it sits today. Weekly services are no longer held. The church has since been recognized as an Alabama Historic Site and held annual Hardaway Baptist Church Reunions until around 2018.

== The Railroad ==
On November 27, 1891, a railroad was completed and the first steam locomotive came through. The person responsible for the railroad construction was Robert Hardaway. Before the railroad was brought to the town merchants needed to intercept the train in Fitzpatrick, Alabama to gather supplies. The arrival of the train startled many of the residents of the community. The railroad was removed sometime around 2003.

== The Hardaway Post Office ==
It is unknown when the post office was constructed, but it is documented that the name was officially changed from Dick's Creek Post Office to Hardaway Post Office on Oct 6, 1892 following the completion of the rail and the renaming of the town. During the Civil War the post office received via horseback and was located in a log house where postmaster John M. F. Parker lived.
