= Tuskegee Human and Civil Rights Museum =

Museum dedicated to the Tuskegee syphilis victims

Coordinates: 32°25′20″N 85°41′29″W

The Tuskegee History Center, also known as the Tuskegee Human and Civil Rights Multicultural Center and Tuskegee Human and Civil Rights Museum, is in Tuskegee, Alabama at 104 South Elm Street. It was established in 1997 and is on the U.S. Civil Rights History Trail. It also serves as the official welcome center for Macon County, Alabama and Tuskegee.

The center was established to honor victims of the Tuskegee Syphilis Study conducted through Tuskegee University. The names of the 623 men used in the study are displayed on the center's floor and it offers a different perspective than does the Tuskegee University Legacy Museum. The museum also preserves and exhibits the histories of Native Americans, European Americans, and African Americans in Central Alabama and the town's development through time. Fred D. Gray serves as its president and sought money left over from a settlement over the study to help fund the museum.

In 2011, Auburn University partnered with the center on an oral history project recording interviews about the Lee v. Macon County Board of Education case that helped desegregate Alabama schools. In 2013 the center hosted an event commemorating the 50th anniversary of school integration in Tuskegee. It was aired on C-SPAN. Lowes funded and lent staff to physically repair the museum in 2021.
