= Cross Keys, Alabama =

Unincorporated community in Alabama, United States

- Unincorporated community
- Location in Alabama Location in the United States
- Coordinates: 32°20′02″N 85°53′36″W
- Country: United States
- State: Alabama
- County: Macon
- Elevation: 272 ft (83 m)
- Time zone: UTC-6 (Central (CST))
  - Summer (DST): UTC-5 (CDT)
- Area code: 334
- GNIS feature ID: 156232

Cross Keys is an unincorporated community in Macon County, Alabama, United States.

== History ==
Cross Keys is located south of the former Montgomery and West Point Railroad. The community was named in honor of Cross Keys, South Carolina, the birthplace of early settler J. H. Howard. A post office operated under the name Cross Keys from 1837 to 1906. The community was formerly home to a high school.
