= Alabama State Route 281 =

State highway in Alabama, United States

State Route 281
- Talladega Scenic Drive

Route information
- Maintained by ALDOT
- Length: 26.834 mi (43.185 km)
- Existed: 1995–present
- Tourist routes: Talladega Scenic Drive

Major junctions
- South end: Talladega National Forest near Mount Cheaha State Park
- SR 49 near Mount Cheaha
- North end: US 78 / SR 9 west of Heflin

Location
- Country: United States
- State: Alabama
- Counties: Clay, Cleburne

Highway system
- Alabama State Highway System; Interstate; US; State
← US 280	→ SR 283

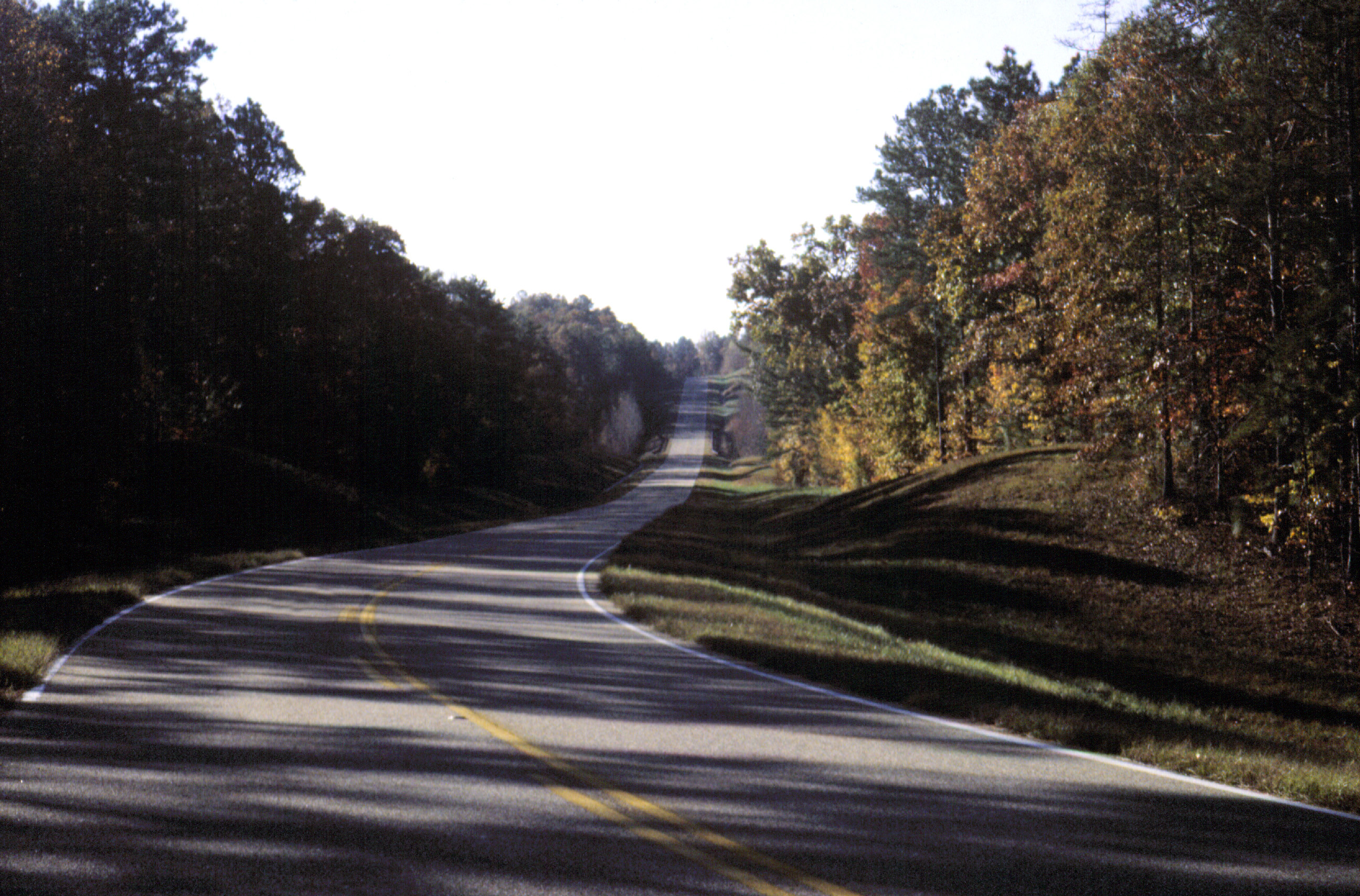
Talladega Scenic Drive through the Talladega National Forest

State Route 281 in Alabama, also known as SR 281 and as Talladega Scenic Drive, extends from U.S. Route 78/State Route 9 (US 78/SR 9) west of Heflin to the intersection of two forest roads in the Talladega National Forest. Running the crest of the Talladega Mountains, Alabama's highest range, SR 281 was originally an unpaved forest route known as Skyway Motorway prior to the reconstruction into a paved scenic highway. SR 281 connects traffic to Cheaha State Park, a state park built on top of the highest point in the state, elevation 2,405 feet (733 m).

SR 281 does cross both US 431 and I-20 via overpasses, but does not intersect either of them. US 431 can be reached however via Cleburne County Road 131 (CR 131), a former alignment of the Skyway Motorway and a short connector to SR 281.

== History ==
When first built, the Talladega Scenic Drive was known as SR 49 and SR 49 Spur. SR 49 Spur extended from where SR 49 ends today to Cheaha Mountain where it continued from there west to Talladega as a narrow county road. In the early 1990s, SR 49 Spur was extended south along the western side of the Talladega Mountains, ending at a remote location in the national forest at the fork of two forest roads, one which was part of the old Skyway Motorway. When work was completed on this extension, SR 49 was truncated south of the Spur and both SR 49 north of the spur and the spur itself were both designated as SR 281.

== Future ==
While far from a complete route through the Talladega Mountains, SR 281 serves to provide access to outdoor recreation in the Talladega National Forest and the highest peaks of the range. However, the stub ending at the south end of the highway has resulted in very low traffic volumes on the route south of Cheaha Mountain and it is unknown if work has or will commence again to connect the highway south to SR 77. The assumption that a longer route has always been planned due to the high mileages posted on the mile markers along the route is incorrect. ALDOT uses Mile 500 as a "countdown" mile marker, since the eventual length of highway is not known. When SR 95 was extended from US 84 to the Florida State Line, the same method was used in posting mile markers. Going down from Mile 1 to Mile 0, the next mile was marked Mile 499.

== Major intersections ==
County	Location	mi	km	Destinations	Notes
Clay	Talladega National Forest	470.462	757.135	Talladega Scenic Highway / Adams Gap Road	Southern terminus; end state Maintenance
Cleburne	Cheaha State Park	476.982	767.628	SR 49 south – Lineville	Northern terminus of SR 49
Cleburne				CR 131 north to US 431 – Oxford, Wedowee	Former alignment of Skyway Motorway
Cleburne		497.296	800.320	US 78 (SR 4) / SR 9 – Oxford, Piedmont, Heflin	Northern terminus; interchange via access road; road continues north as CR 500 north (Skyway Motorway)
1.000 mi = 1.609 km; 1.000 km = 0.621 mi

Geographic data related to Alabama State Route 281 at OpenStreetMap
