= Lanett Municipal Airport =

Airport in Alabama, United States

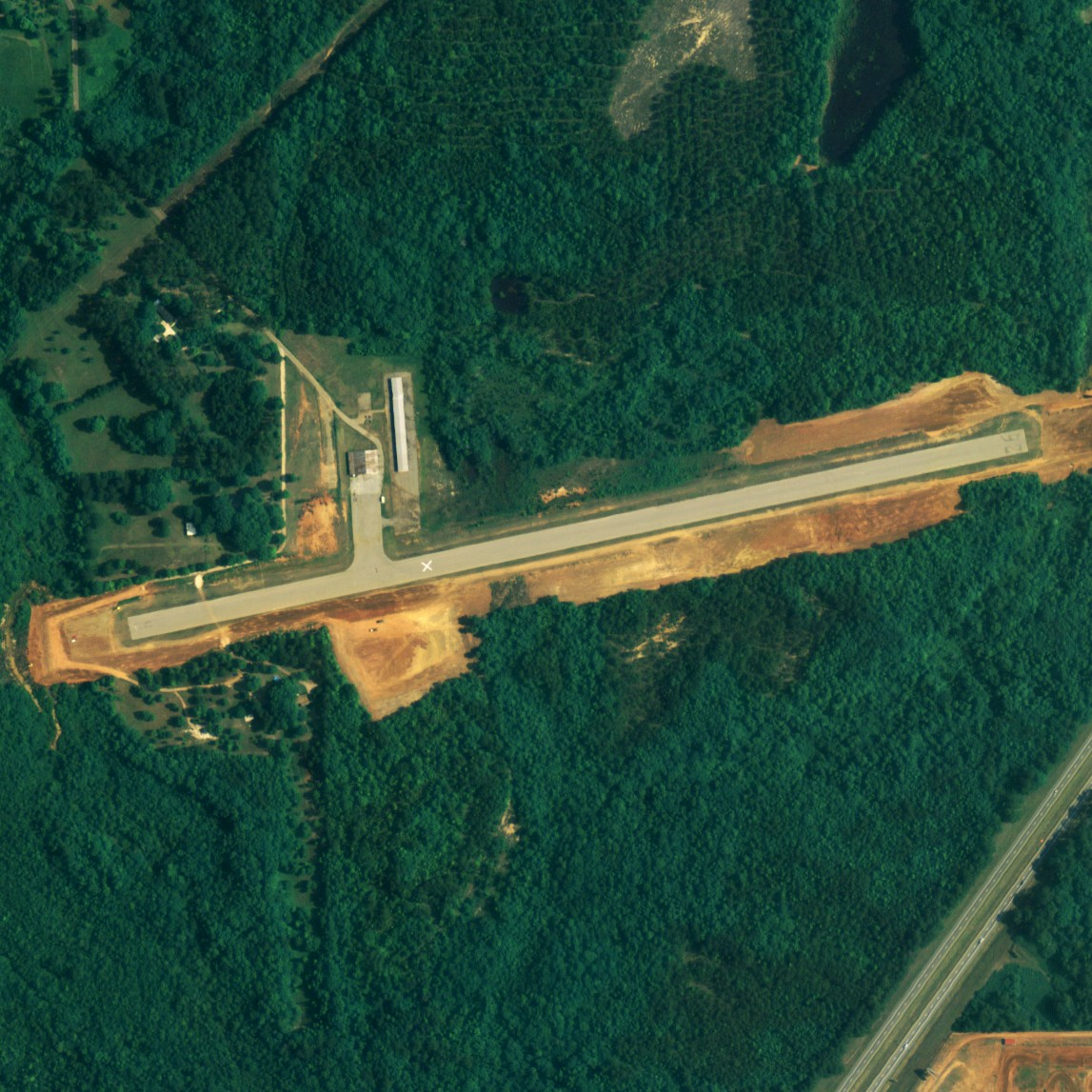
- NAIP aerial image, 2006
- IATA: none; ICAO: none; FAA LID: 7A3

Summary
- Airport type: Public
- Owner: City of Lanett
- Serves: Lanett, Alabama
- Elevation AMSL: 624 ft (190 m)
- Coordinates: 32°48′43″N 085°13′46″W
- Interactive map of Lanett Municipal Airport

Runways
Direction	Length		Surface
Direction	ft	m	Surface
8/26	3,148	960	Asphalt

Statistics (2010)
- Aircraft operations: 3,290
- Based aircraft: 13
- Source: Federal Aviation Administration

Lanett Municipal Airport (FAA LID: 7A3) is a city-owned public-use airport located three nautical miles (6 km) southwest of the central business district of Lanett, a city in Chambers County, Alabama, United States. According to the FAA's National Plan of Integrated Airport Systems for 2009–2013, it is categorized as a general aviation facility.

== Facilities and aircraft ==
Lanett Municipal Airport covers an area of 150 acres (61 ha) at an elevation of 624 feet (190 m) above mean sea level. It has one runway designated 8/26 with an asphalt surface measuring 3,148 by 80 feet (960 x 24 m).

In February of 2022, Lanett M.A., opened a 5400 by 90 feet asphalt runway.

For the 12-month period ending February 24, 2010, the airport had 3,290 aircraft operations, an average of 274 per month: 99.7% general aviation and 0.3% military. At that time there were 13 aircraft based at this airport: 84.6% single-engine, 7.7% multi-engine and 7.7% ultralight.

== See also ==
- List of airports in Alabama
