= Tuskegee University Legacy Museum =

Coordinates: 32°26′00″N 85°42′16″W

Tuskegee University Legacy Museum, also known as the Legacy Museum, is located at Tuskegee University at in Kenney Hall at 1200 W. Montgomery Rd., Tuskegee, AL 36088, adjacent to the National Center for Bioethics in Research and Health Care. Like the Tuskegee Human and Civil Rights Museum, the museum's origins stem from Bill Clinton's 1997 apology to the victims of the Tuskegee Syphilis Study, formally known as the Official Proclamation by President William Jefferson Clinton against the misdeeds of the United States Public Health Service in its Untreated Syphilis Study in the Negro Male in Macon County, Alabama, 1932-1972. Clinton's apology first led to the creation of the University's Bioethics Center in 2006, and the museum followed in 2009.

The museum's permanent exhibits include: The Patient, The Project, The Partnership: The Mass Production and Distribution of HeLa cells at Tuskegee University and the United States Public Health Service Untreated Syphilis Study in the Negro Male, 1932-1972. It also tells the story of George Washington Carver's scientific and medical work.
