= Desi Barmore =

American-Israeli basketball player

Desi Barmore דזי בארמור
Personal information
- Born: May 27, 1960 (age 66) Lanett, Alabama, U.S.
- Listed height: 6 ft 8 in (2.03 m)

Career information
- College: Southeast Missouri State (1978–1979); Alabama (1979–1981); Fresno State (1981–1983)
- NBA draft: 1983: 7th round, 151st overall pick
- Drafted by: New York Knicks
- Position: Power forward / center
- Stats at Basketball Reference

Desi Barmore (Hebrew: דזי בארמור; born May 27, 1960) is an American-Israeli former basketball player. He played the forward and center positions. Barmore played in the Israeli Basketball Premier League, and for the Israeli national basketball team.

== Biography ==
Barmore was born in Lanett, Alabama, and lived in Freeport, New York. He is 6 feet 8 inches (203 cm) tall.

He attended and played basketball for Southeast Missouri State, the University of Alabama, playing for the Alabama Crimson Tide, and Fresno State ('83), playing for the Fresno State Bulldogs. Barmore was selected by the New York Knicks in the seventh round (151st pick overall) of the 1983 NBA draft.

Barmore played in the Israeli Basketball Premier League for Hapoel Holon, Hapoel Galil Elyon, Ramat Gan, Maccabi Rishon LeZion, and Bnei Herzelia.

He represented the Israeli national basketball team in the 1993 FIBA European Championship for Men.
