= Macon County, Alabama =

County in Alabama, United States

- County
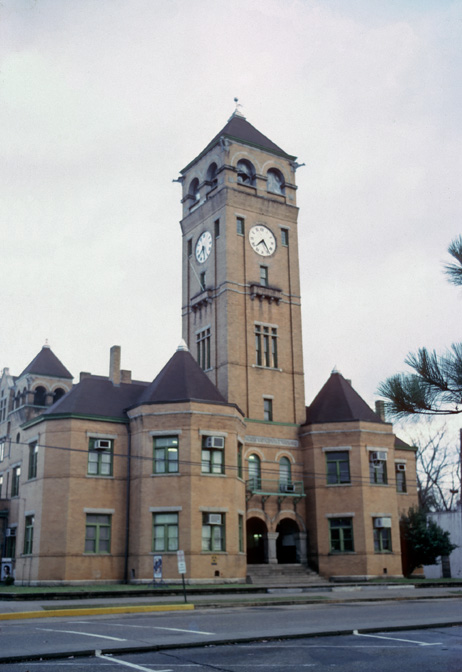
- Macon County Courthouse in Tuskegee

- Flag Seal

- Location within the U.S. state of Alabama
- Coordinates: 32°23′07″N 85°41′37″W
- Country: United States
- State: Alabama
- Founded: December 18, 1832
- Named for: Nathaniel Macon
- Seat: Tuskegee
- Largest city: Tuskegee

Area
  - Total: 613 sq mi (1,590 km^{2})
  - Land: 609 sq mi (1,580 km^{2})
  - Water: 4.3 sq mi (11 km^{2}) 0.7%

Population (2020)
  - Total: 19,532
  - Estimate (2025): 18,132 ▼
  - Density: 32.1/sq mi (12.4/km^{2})
- Time zone: UTC−6 (Central)
  - Summer (DST): UTC−5 (CDT)
- Congressional district: 2nd
- Website: www.maconalabama.com
- County Number 46 on Alabama Licence Plates

Macon County is a county located in the east central part of the U.S. state of Alabama. As of the 2020 census, the population was 19,532. Its county seat is Tuskegee. Its name is in honor of Nathaniel Macon, a member of the United States Senate from North Carolina.

Developed for cotton plantation agriculture in the nineteenth century, the county is considered within the Black Belt of the South. It has had a majority-black population since before the American Civil War.

== History ==
For thousands of years, this area was inhabited by varying cultures of indigenous peoples. The historic tribes encountered by European explorers were the Creek people, descendants of the Mississippian culture.

Macon County was established by European Americans on December 18, 1832, from land ceded by the Creek, following the US Congress' passage of the Indian Removal Act of 1830. The Creek were removed to Indian Territory west of the Mississippi River. The new settlers brought slaves with them from eastern areas of the South or purchased them at the slave market in Montgomery, New Orleans or Mobile. They developed the county for large cotton plantations.

In the first half of the twentieth century, thousands of African-Americans migrated out of the county to industrial cities in the North and Midwest for job opportunities, and the chance to escape legal segregation. Those who remained have struggled for employment in the mostly rural county, and population has declined by about one-third since 1950.

While Alabama has the 5th highest gun related death rate among states at 24 per 100 000, Macon County has one of the highest gun homicide rates in the nation at 44.5 per 100 000.

Before 1983, Macon County was primarily known as the home of historic Tuskegee Institute, now Tuskegee University, and its noted founder and first president, Booker T. Washington.

== Geography ==
According to the United States Census Bureau, the county has a total area of 613 square miles (1,590 km^{2}), of which 609 square miles (1,580 km^{2}) is land and 4.3 square miles (11 km^{2}) (0.7%) is water.

=== Major highways ===
- Interstate 85
- U.S. Highway 29 / State Route 15 (unsigned)
- U.S. Highway 80 / State Route 8 (unsigned)
- State Route 14
- State Route 49
- State Route 51
- State Route 81
- State Route 120
- State Route 138
- State Route 186
- State Route 199
- State Route 229

=== Adjacent counties ===
- Tallapoosa County (north)
- Lee County (northeast)
- Russell County (southeast)
- Bullock County (south)
- Montgomery County (southwest)
- Elmore County (northwest)

=== National protected areas ===
- Tuskegee Airmen National Historic Site
- Tuskegee Institute National Historic Site
- The George Washington Carver Museum
- Tuskegee National Forest

=== Railroads ===
- CSX A&WP Subdivision
- Former Seaboard Line (abandoned)

== Demographics ==
Historical population
Census	Pop.	Note	%±
1840	11,247		—
1850	26,898		139.2%
1860	26,802		−0.4%
1870	17,727		−33.9%
1880	17,371		−2.0%
1890	18,439		6.1%
1900	23,126		25.4%
1910	26,049		12.6%
1920	23,561		−9.6%
1930	27,103		15.0%
1940	27,654		2.0%
1950	30,561		10.5%
1960	26,717		−12.6%
1970	24,841		−7.0%
1980	26,829		8.0%
1990	24,928		−7.1%
2000	24,105		−3.3%
2010	21,452		−11.0%
2020	19,532		−9.0%
2025 (est.)	18,132	▼	−7.2%
U.S. Decennial Census; 1790–1960 1900–1990; 1990–2000 2010–2020

=== 2020 census ===
As of the 2020 United States census, the county had a population of 19,532. The median age was 39.6 years. 16.9% of residents were under the age of 18 and 20.0% of residents were 65 years of age or older. For every 100 females there were 82.6 males, and for every 100 females age 18 and over there were 78.5 males age 18 and over.

46.1% of residents lived in urban areas, while 53.9% lived in rural areas.

There were 7,965 households in the county, of which 23.9% had children under the age of 18 living with them and 44.7% had a female householder with no spouse or partner present. About 39.0% of all households were made up of individuals and 15.7% had someone living alone who was 65 years of age or older.

There were 9,604 housing units, of which 17.1% were vacant. Among occupied housing units, 63.1% were owner-occupied and 36.9% were renter-occupied. The homeowner vacancy rate was 1.8% and the rental vacancy rate was 9.2%.

=== Racial and ethnic composition ===
Macon County, Alabama – Racial and ethnic composition Note: the US Census treats Hispanic/Latino as an ethnic category. This table excludes Latinos from the racial categories and assigns them to a separate category. Hispanics/Latinos may be of any race.
Race / Ethnicity (NH = Non-Hispanic)	Pop 2000	Pop 2010	Pop 2020	% 2000	% 2010	% 2020
White alone (NH)	3,331	3,267	3,187	13.82%	15.23%	16.32%
Black or African American alone (NH)	20,298	17,631	15,395	84.21%	82.19%	78.82%
Native American or Alaska Native alone (NH)	39	28	48	0.16%	0.13%	0.25%
Asian alone (NH)	91	76	74	0.38%	0.35%	0.38%
Pacific Islander alone (NH)	1	2	4	0.00%	0.01%	0.02%
Other race alone (NH)	10	12	45	0.04%	0.06%	0.23%
Mixed race or Multiracial (NH)	162	204	418	0.67%	0.95%	2.14%
Hispanic or Latino (any race)	173	232	361	0.72%	1.08%	1.85%
Total	24,105	21,452	19,532	100.00%	100.00%	100.00%

=== 2010 census ===
As of the 2010 United States census, there were 21,452 people living in the county. 82.6% were Black or African American, 15.5% White, 0.4% Asian, 0.1% Native American, 0.3% of some other race and 1.1% of two or more races. 1.1% were Hispanic or Latino (of any race).

=== 2000 census ===
As of the census of 2000, there were 24,105 people, 8,950 households, and 5,543 families living in the county. The population density was 40 people per square mile (15 people/km^{2}). There were 10,627 housing units at an average density of 17 units per square mile (6.6 units/km^{2}). The racial makeup of the county was 84.64% Black or African American, 13.96% White, 0.16% Native American, 0.38% Asian, 0.13% from other races, and 0.73% from two or more races. 0.72% of the population were Hispanic or Latino of any race.

There were 8,950 households, out of which 28.40% had children under the age of 18 living with them, 31.70% were married couples living together, 25.80% had a female householder with no husband present, and 38.10% were non-families. 33.00% of all households were made up of individuals, and 11.90% had someone living alone who was 65 years of age or older. The average household size was 2.44 and the average family size was 3.13.

In the county, the population was spread out, with 25.20% under the age of 18, 16.90% from 18 to 24, 22.90% from 25 to 44, 21.00% from 45 to 64, and 14.00% who were 65 years of age or older. The median age was 32 years. For every 100 females there were 85.00 males. For every 100 females age 18 and over, there were 80.30 males.

The median income for a household in the county was $21,180, and the median income for a family was $28,511. Males had a median income of $25,971 versus $21,773 for females. The per capita income for the county was $13,714. About 26.80% of families and 32.80% of the population were below the poverty line, including 43.80% of those under age 18 and 26.00% of those age 65 or over.

== Government ==
Macon County has been overwhelmingly Democratic for most of the past century and a quarter. Apart from the "dealignment" era between 1948 and 1972, and Herbert Hoover in the highly controversial 1928 election, no Republican has won so much as twenty percent of the county's vote in the past century. No Republican has obtained a majority in that time span, although Dwight D. Eisenhower won a narrow plurality in 1956. Although Donald Trump in 2024 was able to crack 20% of the vote for the first time since Nixon in 1972, Macon County was still the most Democratic county in Alabama in that election.

In the elections of 1980, Macon was the most Democratic county in the nation while in 1984 it was the most Democratic outside of the District of Columbia. Macon County was only 0.02 percent shy of this in 1992, when it gave both George H. W. Bush his smallest proportion outside of the District of Columbia and independent Ross Perot his smallest vote share in any county nationwide.

United States presidential election results for Macon County, Alabama
Year	Republican		Democratic		Third party(ies)	
Year	No.	%	No.	%	No.	%
1836	150	81.52%	34	18.48%	0	0.00%
1840	731	68.25%	340	31.75%	0	0.00%
1844	1,087	63.46%	626	36.54%	0	0.00%
1848	1,464	73.35%	532	26.65%	0	0.00%
1852	772	50.49%	658	43.03%	99	6.47%
1856	0	0.00%	1,039	45.61%	1,239	54.39%
1860	0	0.00%	46	1.89%	2,394	98.11%
1868	2,327	68.40%	1,075	31.60%	0	0.00%
1872	2,073	68.62%	948	31.38%	0	0.00%
1876	881	37.11%	1,493	62.89%	0	0.00%
1880	191	26.20%	538	73.80%	0	0.00%
1884	80	19.85%	323	80.15%	0	0.00%
1888	268	22.35%	931	77.65%	0	0.00%
1892	13	1.42%	200	21.81%	704	76.77%
1896	259	19.00%	1,043	76.52%	61	4.48%
1900	511	27.61%	1,295	69.96%	45	2.43%
1904	51	8.23%	562	90.65%	7	1.13%
1908	38	7.18%	482	91.12%	9	1.70%
1912	24	3.46%	647	93.23%	23	3.31%
1916	43	6.92%	575	92.59%	3	0.48%
1920	64	8.43%	693	91.30%	2	0.26%
1924	48	8.15%	538	91.34%	3	0.51%
1928	348	39.68%	526	59.98%	3	0.34%
1932	56	5.82%	905	94.07%	1	0.10%
1936	39	3.29%	1,146	96.71%	0	0.00%
1940	41	3.15%	1,259	96.77%	1	0.08%
1944	82	7.35%	1,032	92.56%	1	0.09%
1948	110	9.08%	0	0.00%	1,101	90.92%
1952	621	29.87%	1,457	70.08%	1	0.05%
1956	1,067	48.65%	1,024	46.69%	102	4.65%
1960	877	39.34%	1,327	59.53%	25	1.12%
1964	1,858	38.46%	0	0.00%	2,973	61.54%
1968	257	4.03%	4,450	69.74%	1,674	26.23%
1972	1,931	33.04%	3,636	62.21%	278	4.76%
1976	1,387	18.62%	5,915	79.41%	147	1.97%
1980	1,259	14.35%	7,028	80.10%	487	5.55%
1984	1,543	16.24%	7,857	82.71%	99	1.04%
1988	1,304	16.81%	6,351	81.88%	101	1.30%
1992	1,134	12.94%	7,253	82.78%	375	4.28%
1996	987	12.03%	7,018	85.55%	198	2.41%
2000	1,091	12.35%	7,665	86.80%	75	0.85%
2004	1,570	16.69%	7,800	82.92%	37	0.39%
2008	1,396	12.83%	9,450	86.88%	31	0.29%
2012	1,331	12.80%	9,045	87.00%	20	0.19%
2016	1,431	15.66%	7,566	82.78%	143	1.56%
2020	1,541	17.67%	7,108	81.49%	74	0.85%
2024	1,682	21.47%	6,084	77.66%	68	0.87%

United States Senate election results for Macon County, Alabama2
Year	Republican		Democratic		Third party(ies)	
Year	No.	%	No.	%	No.	%
2020	1,481	16.99%	7,224	82.87%	12	0.14%

United States Senate election results for Macon County, Alabama3
Year	Republican		Democratic		Third party(ies)	
Year	No.	%	No.	%	No.	%
2022	1,153	21.47%	4,131	76.91%	87	1.62%

Alabama Gubernatorial election results for Macon County
Year	Republican		Democratic		Third party(ies)	
Year	No.	%	No.	%	No.	%
2022	1,244	23.17%	3,994	74.39%	131	2.44%

The Sheriff of Macon County is Andre Brunson, who also was the former strength coach at Tuskegee University.

== Communities ==
=== City ===
- Tuskegee (county seat)

=== Towns ===
- Franklin
- Notasulga (partly in Lee County)
- Shorter

=== Unincorporated communities ===
- Boromville
- Creek Stand
- Cross Keys
- Fort Davis
- Hardaway
- Little Texas
- Milstead
- Society Hill
- Warriorstand

== Places of interest ==
Macon County is home to the Tuskegee University, a historically black college; Tuskegee National Forest, Tuskegee Lake, the Tuskegee Human and Civil Rights Museum, and Moton Field, the training site of the Tuskegee Airmen.

== See also ==
- National Register of Historic Places listings in Macon County, Alabama
- Properties on the Alabama Register of Landmarks and Heritage in Macon County, Alabama
