= Shorter, Alabama =

- Town
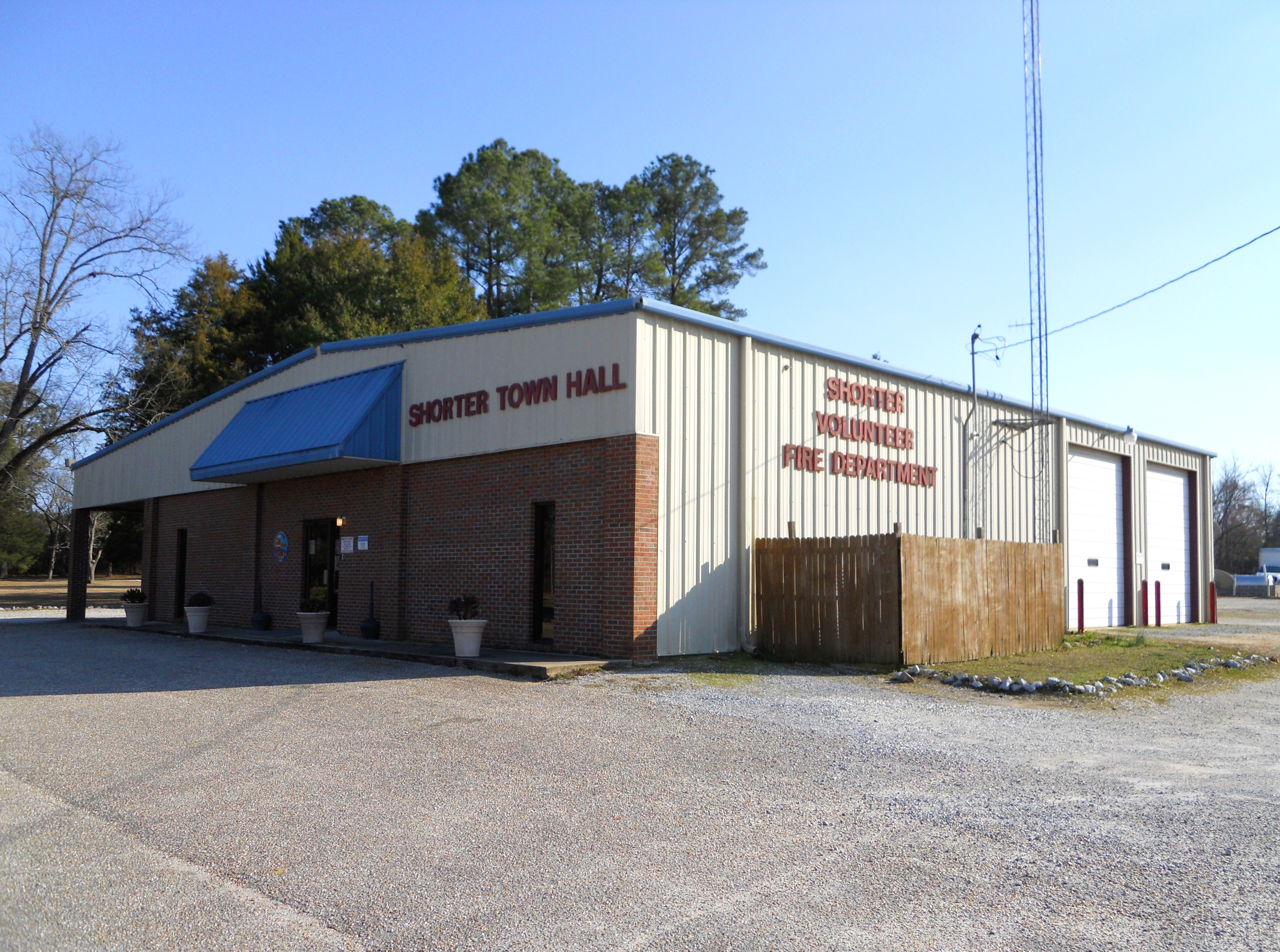
- Shorter town hall and volunteer fire department
- Motto: "A Town on the Move"
- Location in Macon County, Alabama
- Coordinates: 32°24′02″N 85°56′30″W
- Country: United States
- State: Alabama
- County: Macon

Area
  - Total: 4.57 sq mi (11.83 km^{2})
  - Land: 4.54 sq mi (11.76 km^{2})
  - Water: 0.027 sq mi (0.07 km^{2})
- Elevation: 243 ft (74 m)

Population (2020)
  - Total: 385
  - Density: 84.8/sq mi (32.75/km^{2})
- Time zone: UTC-6 (Central (CST))
  - Summer (DST): UTC-5 (CDT)
- ZIP code: 36075
- Area code: 334
- FIPS code: 01-70128
- GNIS feature ID: 2407329
- Website: shorteral.gov

Shorter is a town in Macon County, Alabama, United States. At the 2020 census the population was 385, down from 474 at the 2010 census. According to the 1990 U.S. Census records, it was incorporated in 1984.

== Geography ==
Shorter is located in western Macon County along U.S. Route 80. It is 24 miles (39 km) east of Montgomery, the state capital, and 15 miles (24 km) west of Tuskegee.

According to the U.S. Census Bureau, Shorter has a total area of 4.6 square miles (11.8 km^{2}), of which 0.03 square miles (0.07 km^{2}), or 0.60%, are water. The center of town lies on a low ridge which drains south to Cubahatchee Creek and north to Calebee Creek, both of which are west-flowing tributaries of the Tallapoosa River.

== Demographics ==
Historical population
Census	Pop.	Note	%±
1990	461		—
2000	355		−23.0%
2010	474		33.5%
2020	385		−18.8%
U.S. Decennial Census

=== 2020 census ===
Shorter town, Alabama – Racial and ethnic composition Note: the US Census treats Hispanic/Latino as an ethnic category. This table excludes Latinos from the racial categories and assigns them to a separate category. Hispanics/Latinos may be of any race.
Race / Ethnicity (NH = Non-Hispanic)	Pop 2010	Pop 2020	% 2010	% 2020
White alone (NH)	88	85	18.57%	22.08%
Black or African American alone (NH)	373	270	78.69%	70.13%
Native American or Alaska Native alone (NH)	0	1	0.00%	0.26%
Asian alone (NH)	3	1	0.63%	0.26%
Pacific Islander alone (NH)	0	0	0.00%	0.00%
Some Other Race alone (NH)	0	0	0.00%	0.00%
Mixed Race or Multi-Racial (NH)	5	16	1.05%	4.16%
Hispanic or Latino (any race)	5	12	1.05%	3.12%
Total	474	385	100.00%	100.00%

=== 2000 census ===
As of the census of 2000, there were 355 people, 121 households, and 93 families residing in the town. The population density was 206.1 inhabitants per square mile (79.6/km^{2}). There were 133 housing units at an average density of 77.2 per square mile (29.8/km^{2}). The racial makeup of the town was 82% Black or African American, 16% White, 1% Native American, and 1% from two or more races.

There were 121 households, out of which 36% had children under the age of 18 living with them, 42% were married couples living together, 30% had a female householder with no husband present, and 23% were non-families. 21% of all households were made up of individuals, and 7% had someone living alone who was 65 years of age or older. The average household size was 2.93 and the average family size was 3.45.

In the town, the population was spread out, with 33% under the age of 18, 8% from 18 to 24, 31% from 25 to 44, 20% from 45 to 64, and 8% who were 65 years of age or older. The median age was 33 years. For every 100 females, there were 81.1 males. For every 100 females age 18 and over, there were 80.3 males.

The median income for a household in the town was $18,929, and the median income for a family was $37,188. Males had a median income of $26,667 versus $17,000 for females. The per capita income for the town was $10,630. About 28% of families and 31% of the population were below the poverty line, including 47% of those under age 18 and 43% of those age 65 or over.

== Notable persons ==
- Morris Dees, co-founder and chief trial counsel for the Southern Poverty Law Center
