= Franklin, Alabama =

- Town
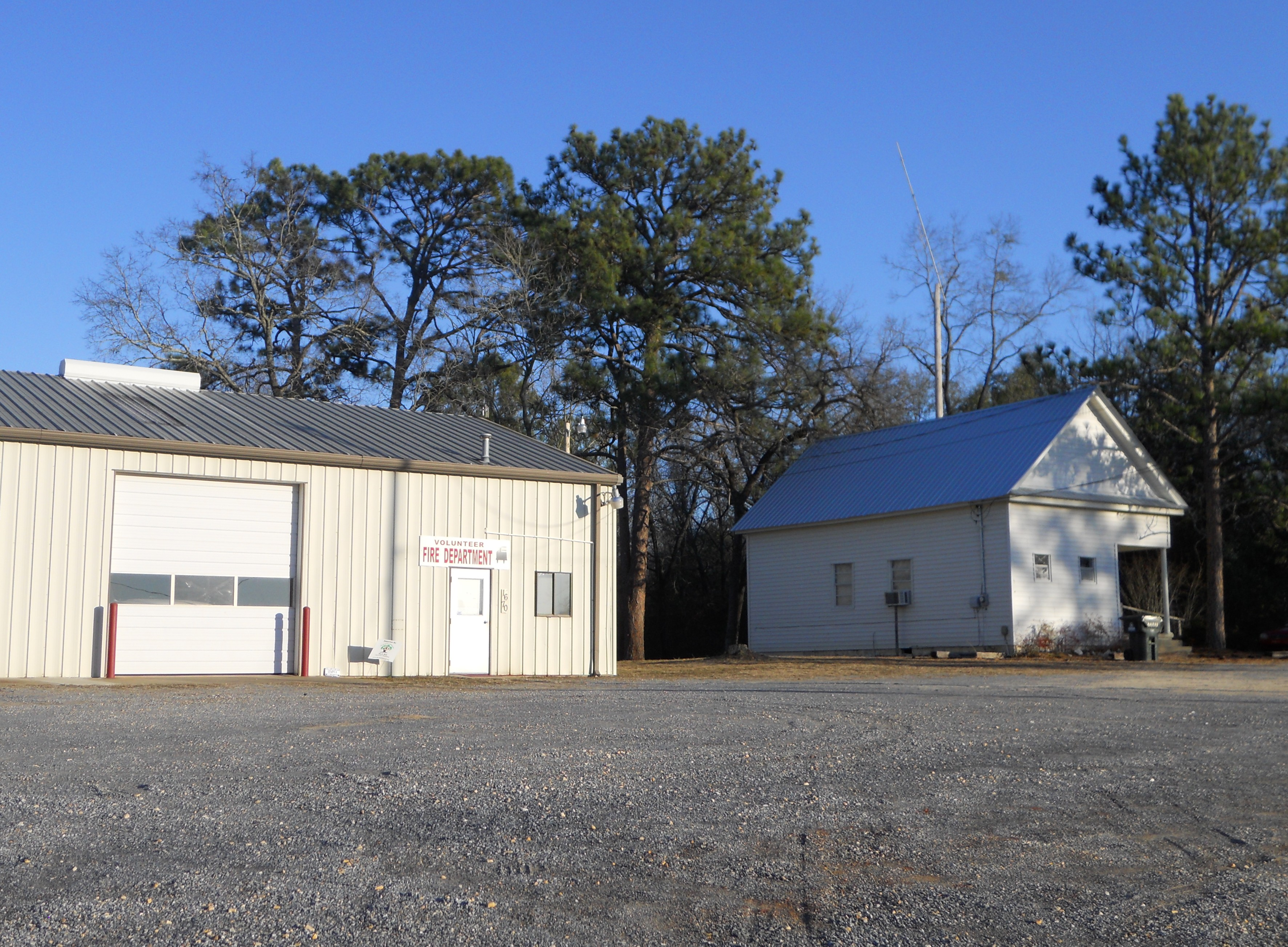
- Franklin Volunteer Fire Department and Town Hall

- Seal

- Location in Macon County, Alabama
- Coordinates: 32°27′01″N 85°46′05″W
- Country: United States
- State: Alabama
- County: Macon

Area
  - Total: 15.11 sq mi (39.14 km^{2})
  - Land: 15.07 sq mi (39.04 km^{2})
  - Water: 0.039 sq mi (0.10 km^{2})
- Elevation: 358 ft (109 m)

Population (2020)
  - Total: 590
  - Density: 39.1/sq mi (15.11/km^{2})
- Time zone: UTC-6 (Central (CST))
  - Summer (DST): UTC-5 (CDT)
- FIPS code: 01-28024
- GNIS feature ID: 2406517
- Website: franklinalabama.com

Franklin is a rural town in Macon County, Alabama, United States. As of the 2020 census, the population was 590.

== History and educational legacy ==
The Muscogee (Creek) people had long been cultivating lands in this area, producing crops of maize, squash and beans (the Three Sisters), and tobacco, used primarily for ritual purposes. Osceola (1804-1838), who became well known as a leader of the Seminole people in Florida, was born to a Creek woman at Red Creek, 10 miles from the Tallapoosa River. He was of mixed race but identified as Creek; the people have a matrilineal kinship system.

Franklin has been home to many churches for more than 200 years. In the late 18th and early 19th centuries, a Methodist Missionary Church operated here for the Creek. It had two cemeteries, one for whites and one for the Creek. James McQueen, a Scots trader who lived here and married a Creek woman, was great-grandfather of Osceola. McQueen is buried in the Indian cemetery.

After the Creek were forced to cede their lands, European Americans developed the area for cotton cultivation. They depended on the labor of enslaved African Americans, many of whom were initially transported to this region from the Upper South in the domestic slave trade. Cotton continued as the chief commodity crop after the Civil War.

Residents established Franklin School by the 1890s, teaching grades 1–11 of white students. By the mid-1930s, the upper grades had been moved to another facility, and it held grades 1–6. Northern and southern classrooms were adjoined by a common auditorium. The school's original water source was a spring near the buildings. A well was later dug in the front yard of the school, with a hand pump to get water. Heat was provided by a wood-burning potbelly stove. Each student brought a stick of wood every morning to burn in the stove.

The school closed in 1942, and its 75–80 students transferred to Tuskegee schools. After the school closed, the northern classroom was moved to its current location and converted to a community center. The rest of the school was torn down.

In the mid-20th century, musician Hank Williams Sr. often performed at dances at the community center. Upon Franklin's incorporation in 1977, the town began using the community center building as the town hall. A mile north of Town Hall lay the remnants of what is rumored to be the first school in Macon County.

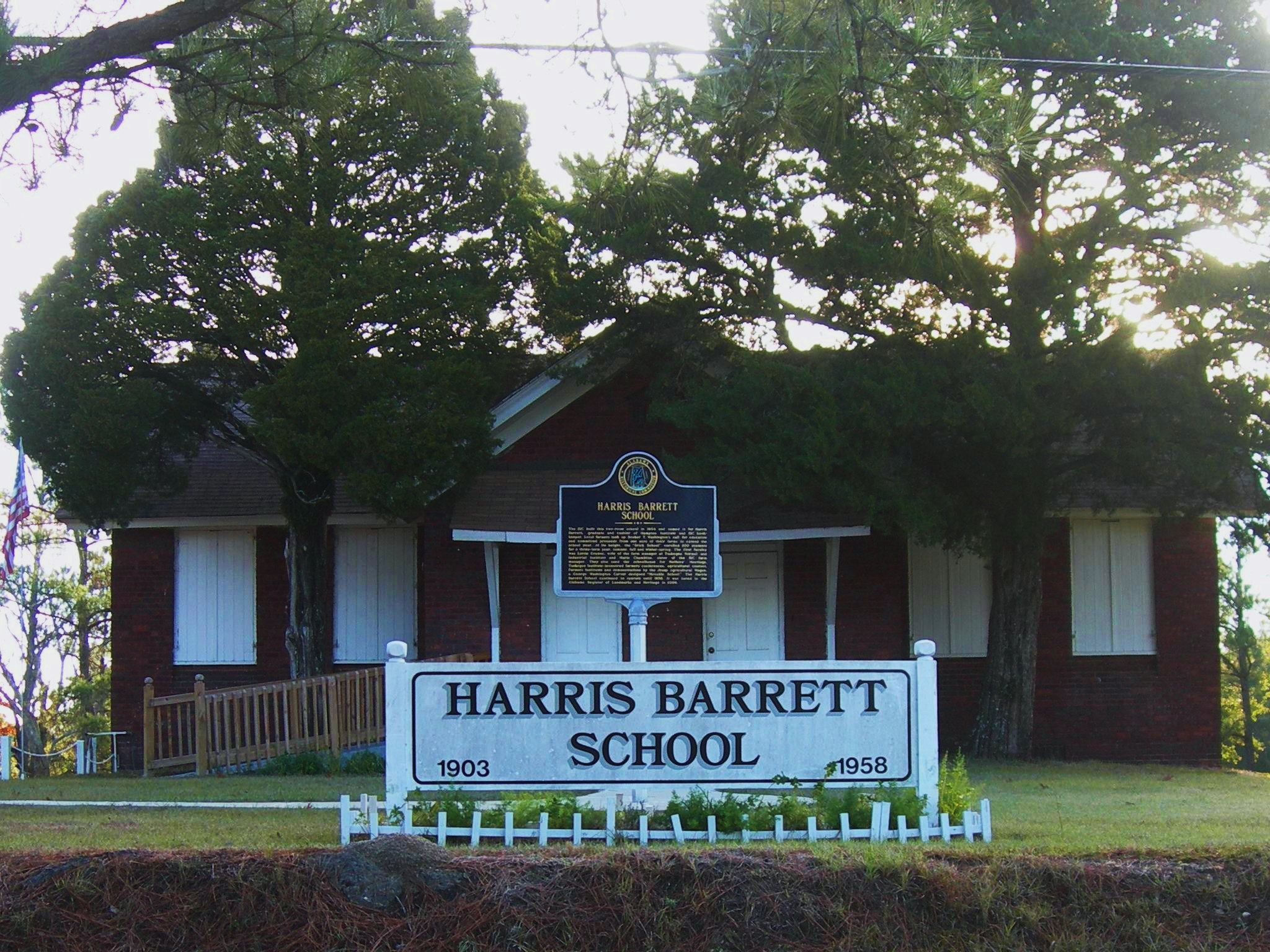
Harris Barret School.

Harris Barrett School was built in 1903 with handmade bricks made by students of the Tuskegee Normal School (now Tuskegee University), under the direction of Booker T. Washington. In the segregated system of public facilities, the Barrett School was reserved for African-American students, who were mostly descendants of freedmen in this rural area. Both the Barrett School and the Tuskegee Institute played a major role in education in the Franklin community. They operated an experimental farm on the west side of Baldwin Farm Road. Booker T. Washington and George Washington Carver were both active in farming in Franklin, and assisted farmers both black and white. Harris Barrett School was restored and is operated as a historic museum; it is located at the corner of Co. Rd. 27 and 36.

== Geography ==
According to the U.S. Census Bureau, the town has a total area of 3.34 square miles (8.7 km^{2}), all land.

== Demographics ==
Historical population
Census	Pop.	Note	%±
1970	173		—
1980	133		−23.1%
1990	152		14.3%
2000	149		−2.0%
2010	149		0.0%
2020	590		296.0%
U.S. Decennial Census; 2013 Estimate

=== 2020 census ===
Franklin town, Alabama – Racial and ethnic composition Note: the US Census treats Hispanic/Latino as an ethnic category. This table excludes Latinos from the racial categories and assigns them to a separate category. Hispanics/Latinos may be of any race.
Race / Ethnicity (NH = Non-Hispanic)	Pop 2010	Pop 2020	% 2010	% 2020
White alone (NH)	71	97	47.65%	16.44%
Black or African American alone (NH)	74	473	49.66%	80.17%
Native American or Alaska Native alone (NH)	0	1	0.00%	0.17%
Asian alone (NH)	2	0	1.34%	0.00%
Pacific Islander alone (NH)	0	0	0.00%	0.00%
Some Other Race alone (NH)	0	1	0.00%	0.17%
Mixed Race or Multi-Racial (NH)	2	10	1.34%	1.69%
Hispanic or Latino (any race)	0	8	0.00%	1.36%
Total	149	590	100.00%	100.00%

As of the census of 2000, there were 145 people, 59 households, and 44 families residing in the town. The population density was 43 people per square mile (17 people/km^{2}). There were 73 housing units at an average density of 18.0 per square mile (6.9/km^{2}). The racial makeup of the town was 56.38% Black or African American and 43.62% White. 0.67% of the population were Hispanic or Latino of any race.

There were 59 households, of which 28.1% had children under the age of 18 living with them, 51.6% were married couples living together, 15.6% had a female householder with no husband present, and 25.0% were non-families. 21.9% of all households were made up of individuals, and 10.9% had someone living alone who was 65 years of age or older. The average household size was 2.33 and the average family size was 2.69.

In the town, the population was spread out, with 20.1% under the age of 18, 10.7% from 18 to 24, 18.1% from 25 to 44, 33.6% from 45 to 64, and 17.4% who were 65 years of age or older. The median age was 47 years. For every 100 females, there were 96.1 males. For every 100 females age 18 and over, there were 88.9 males.

The median income for a household in the town was $45,923, and the median income for a family was $53,111. Males had a median income of $43,840 versus $40,744 for females. The per capita income for the town was $45,495. 4.9% of the population were living below the poverty line. 9.7% of those were over the age of 64.

== Government ==
The Town of Franklin is a mayor-council form of government with a mayor and 5 councilpersons which are elected every four years. The town operates its own police department, volunteer fire department, as well as water system.

Mayor: Rheba J. Knox; Mayor Pro-Tem: Robert T. Perry; Council Members: Alvin Sears, David Clinkscales, Robin Mardis, and Dominguez Hurry

Town Clerk/Treasurer: Micha Segrest

Chief of Police: Jeffrey Mckinstry

Fire Chief: Scott Cooper
