= Huguley, Alabama =

- Census-designated place
- Location in Chambers County and the state of Alabama
- Coordinates: 32°50′46″N 85°14′53″W
- Country: United States
- State: Alabama
- County: Chambers

Area
  - Total: 8.27 sq mi (21.42 km^{2})
  - Land: 8.27 sq mi (21.42 km^{2})
  - Water: 0 sq mi (0.00 km^{2})
- Elevation: 705 ft (215 m)

Population (2020)
  - Total: 2,470
  - Density: 298.7/sq mi (115.31/km^{2})
- Time zone: UTC-6 (Central (CST))
  - Summer (DST): UTC-5 (CDT)
- FIPS code: 01-36592
- GNIS feature ID: 2402603

Huguley (/ˈhjuːɡəli/ HEW-goo-lee) is a census-designated place (CDP) and unincorporated community in Chambers County, Alabama, United States. At the 2020 census, the population was 2,470.

== Geography ==
Huguley is located in southeastern Chambers County. It is bordered by the city of Lanett to the east and the city of Valley to the southeast.

According to the U.S. Census Bureau, the CDP has a total area of 8.3 square miles (21.6 km^{2}), all land.

== Demographics ==
Historical population
Census	Pop.	Note	%±
1980	2,947		—
1990	3,161		7.3%
2000	2,955		−6.5%
2010	2,540		−14.0%
2020	2,470		−2.8%
U.S. Decennial Census; 1850-1870 1870-1880; 1890-1910 1920 1930; 1940 1950 1960; 1970 1980 1990; 2000 2010

=== Racial and ethnic composition ===
Huguley CDP, Alabama – Racial and ethnic composition Note: the US Census treats Hispanic/Latino as an ethnic category. This table excludes Latinos from the racial categories and assigns them to a separate category. Hispanics/Latinos may be of any race.
Race / Ethnicity (NH = Non-Hispanic)	Pop 2000	Pop 2010	Pop 2020	% 2000	% 2010	% 2020
White alone (NH)	2,161	1,843	1,650	73.18%	72.56%	66.80%
Black or African American alone (NH)	735	630	676	24.89%	24.80%	27.37%
Native American or Alaska Native alone (NH)	3	15	11	0.10%	0.59%	0.45%
Asian alone (NH)	2	6	12	0.07%	0.24%	0.49%
Native Hawaiian or Pacific Islander alone (NH)	0	0	0	0.00%	0.00%	0.00%
Other race alone (NH)	0	2	6	0.00%	0.08%	0.24%
Mixed race or Multiracial (NH)	22	14	71	0.75%	0.55%	2.87%
Hispanic or Latino (any race)	30	30	44	1.02%	1.18%	1.78%
Total	2,953	2,540	2,470	100.00%	100.00%	100.00%

=== 2020 census ===
As of the 2020 census, Huguley had a population of 2,470. The median age was 43.2 years. 20.4% of residents were under the age of 18 and 18.1% of residents were 65 years of age or older. For every 100 females there were 94.9 males, and for every 100 females age 18 and over there were 96.1 males age 18 and over.

33.1% of residents lived in urban areas, while 66.9% lived in rural areas.

There were 1,007 households in Huguley, of which 29.1% had children under the age of 18 living in them. Of all households, 42.8% were married-couple households, 21.9% were households with a male householder and no spouse or partner present, and 28.6% were households with a female householder and no spouse or partner present. About 26.9% of all households were made up of individuals and 10.1% had someone living alone who was 65 years of age or older.

There were 1,129 housing units, of which 10.8% were vacant. The homeowner vacancy rate was 1.2% and the rental vacancy rate was 6.1%.

=== 2010 census ===
At the 2010 census, there were 2,540 people, 1,029 households and 707 families residing in the community. The population density was 304 inhabitants per square mile (117/km^{2}). There were 1,153 housing units at an average density of 138.9 per square mile (53.6/km^{2}). The racial makeup of the community was 73.0% White, 25.0% Black or African American, 0.6% Native American, 0.2% Asian, 0.4% from other races, and 0.7% from two or more races. 1.2% of the population were Hispanic or Latino of any race.

There were 1,029 households, of which 27.1% had children under the age of 18 living with them, 46.8% were married couples living together, 16.6% had a female householder with no husband present, and 31.3% were non-families. 28.2% of all households were made up of individuals, and 11.3% had someone living alone who was 65 years of age or older. The average household size was 2.47 and the average family size was 3.00.

23.8% of the population were under the age of 18, 7.9% from 18 to 24, 24.0% from 25 to 44, 28.8% from 45 to 64, and 15.4% who were 65 years of age or older. The median age was 40.6 years. For every 100 females, there were 94.8 males. For every 100 females age 18 and over, there were 97.8 males.

The median household income was $32,697 and the median family income was $46,813. Males had a median income of $33,938 compared with $35,461 for females. The per capita income was $17,886. About 9.9% of families and 10.7% of the population were below the poverty line, including 9.9% of those under age 18 and 13.3% of those age 65 or over.

== Notable person ==
- Razzy Bailey, country music artist
