= Lanett, Alabama =

City in Alabama, United States

Lanett
- City
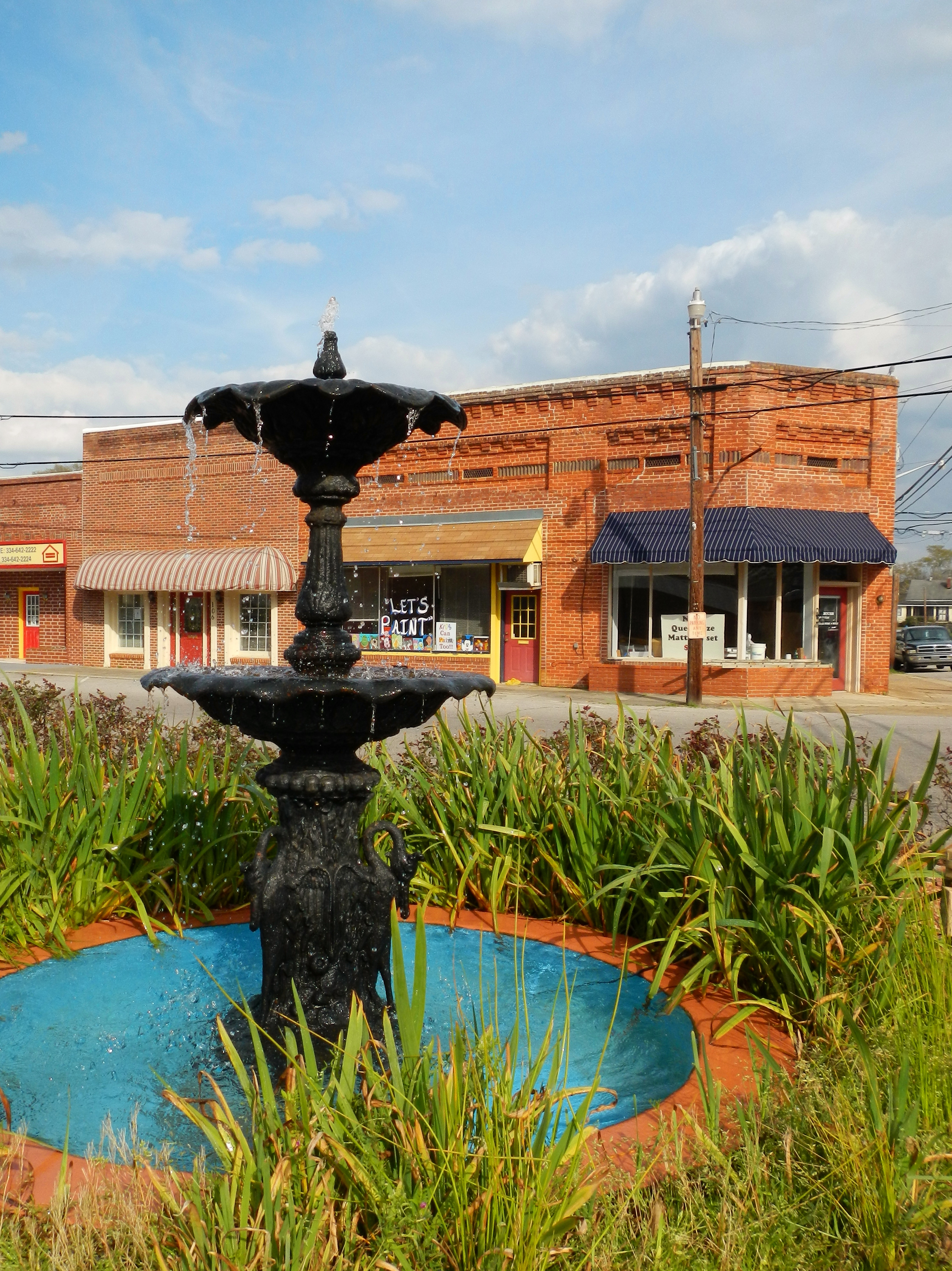
- Downtown Lanett

- Seal
- Motto: "The Gateway to Alabama"
- Location of Lanett in Chambers County, Alabama.
- Coordinates: 32°51′28″N 85°12′39″W
- Country: United States
- State: Alabama
- County: Chambers

Government
  - Type: Mayor – Council Form of Government

Area
  - City: 6.24 sq mi (16.17 km^{2})
  - Land: 6.24 sq mi (16.17 km^{2})
  - Water: 0 sq mi (0.00 km^{2})
- Elevation: 581 ft (177 m)

Population (2020)
  - City: 6,970
  - Density: 1,116.6/sq mi (431.11/km^{2})
  - Urban: 20,466
- Time zone: UTC−6 (Central)
- ZIP code: 36863
- Area code: 334
- FIPS code: 01-41296
- GNIS feature ID: 2404883
- Website: www.cityoflanett.com

Lanett is a city in Chambers County, Alabama, United States. As of the 2020 census, Lanett had a population of 6,970. Lanett, originally called Bluffton, is located in eastern Alabama, on the Chattahoochee River, southwest of Atlanta. The city's name is derived from Lafayette Lanier and Theodore Bennett, founders of the West Point Manufacturing Company.

== Geography ==
Lanett is located on the eastern edge of Chambers County. Its eastern boundary is the Alabama–Georgia state line, with the town of West Point, Georgia, bordering Lanett to the east. Interstate 85 forms the southeast boundary of Lanett, with the city of Valley, Alabama, on the other side of the highway. The unincorporated community of Huguley is along Lanett's southwest border.

The Chattahoochee River forms the state line and eastern boundary of Lanett from I-85 north to the downtown area, at which point the state line turns north-northwest and becomes a land boundary between Lanett and West Point, Georgia.

According to the U.S. Census Bureau, Lanett has a total area of 6.2 square miles (16.1 km^{2}), all land.

== Demographics ==
Historical population
Census	Pop.	Note	%±
1880	655		—
1890	777		18.6%
1900	2,909		274.4%
1910	3,820		31.3%
1920	4,976		30.3%
1930	5,204		4.6%
1940	6,141		18.0%
1950	7,434		21.1%
1960	7,674		3.2%
1970	6,908		−10.0%
1980	8,922		29.2%
1990	8,985		0.7%
2000	7,897		−12.1%
2010	6,468		−18.1%
2020	6,970		7.8%
U.S. Decennial Census; 2013 Estimate

=== 2020 census ===
Lanett city, Alabama – Racial and ethnic composition Note: the US Census treats Hispanic/Latino as an ethnic category. This table excludes Latinos from the racial categories and assigns them to a separate category. Hispanics/Latinos may be of any race.
Race / Ethnicity (NH = Non-Hispanic)	Pop 2000	Pop 2010	Pop 2020	% 2000	% 2010	% 2020
White alone (NH)	3,551	2,496	2,146	44.97%	38.59%	30.79%
Black or African American alone (NH)	4,213	3,694	4,098	53.35%	57.11%	58.79%
Native American or Alaska Native alone (NH)	9	11	9	0.11%	0.17%	0.13%
Asian alone (NH)	17	7	28	0.22%	0.11%	0.40%
Native Hawaiian or Pacific Islander alone (NH)	0	0	5	0.00%	0.00%	0.07%
Other race alone (NH)	4	16	12	0.05%	0.25%	0.17%
Mixed race or Multiracial (NH)	40	86	158	0.51%	1.33%	2.27%
Hispanic or Latino (any race)	63	158	514	0.80%	2.44%	7.37%
Total	7,897	6,468	6,970	100.00%	100.00%	100.00%

=== 2020 census ===
As of the 2020 census, Lanett had a population of 6,970 and contained 2,695 households and 1,487 families.

The median age was 39.1 years; 22.5% of residents were under the age of 18 and 20.1% were 65 years of age or older. For every 100 females there were 94.4 males, and for every 100 females age 18 and over there were 93.0 males age 18 and over.

95.6% of residents lived in urban areas, while 4.4% lived in rural areas.

There were 2,695 households in Lanett, of which 29.5% had children under the age of 18 living in them. Of all households, 29.8% were married-couple households, 21.5% were households with a male householder and no spouse or partner present, and 42.9% were households with a female householder and no spouse or partner present. About 31.3% of all households were made up of individuals and 14.7% had someone living alone who was 65 years of age or older.

There were 3,145 housing units, of which 14.3% were vacant. The homeowner vacancy rate was 2.6% and the rental vacancy rate was 6.7%.

Lanett racial composition
Race	Num.	Perc.
White	2,216	31.8%
Black or African American	4,120	59.1%
American Indian and Alaska Native	37	0.5%
Asian	30	0.4%
Native Hawaiian and Other Pacific Islander	7	0.1%
Some other race	321	4.6%
Two or more races	239	3.4%
Hispanic or Latino (of any race)	514	7.4%

=== 2010 census ===
As of the census of 2010, there were 6,468 people, 2,723 households, and 1,746 families residing in the city. The population density was 1,040 inhabitants per square mile (400/km^{2}). There were 3,338 housing units at an average density of 538 per square mile (208/km^{2}). The racial makeup of the city was 57.5% Black or African American, 39.3% White, 0.2% Native American, 0.1% Asian, 1.4% from other races, and 1.5% from two or more races. 2.4% of the population were Hispanic or Latino of any race.

There were 2,723 households, out of which 23.2% had children under the age of 18 living with them, 32.6% were married couples living together, 25.4% had a female householder with no husband present, and 35.9% were non-families. 32.1% of all households were made up of individuals, and 14.6% had someone living alone who was 65 years of age or older. The average household size was 2.34 and the average family size was 2.93.

In the city, the age distribution of the population shows 22.3% under the age of 18, 8.8% from 18 to 24, 22.6% from 25 to 44, 28.0% from 45 to 64, and 18.3% who were 65 years of age or older. The median age was 41.8 years. For every 100 females, there were 85.1 males. For every 100 females age 18 and over, there were 87.4 males.

The median income for a household in the city was $25,220, and the median income for a family was $27,487. Males had a median income of $32,386 versus $24,794 for females. The per capita income for the city was $14,178. About 22.7% of families and 28.7% of the population were below the poverty line, including 48.0% of those under age 18 and 16.8% of those age 65 or over.

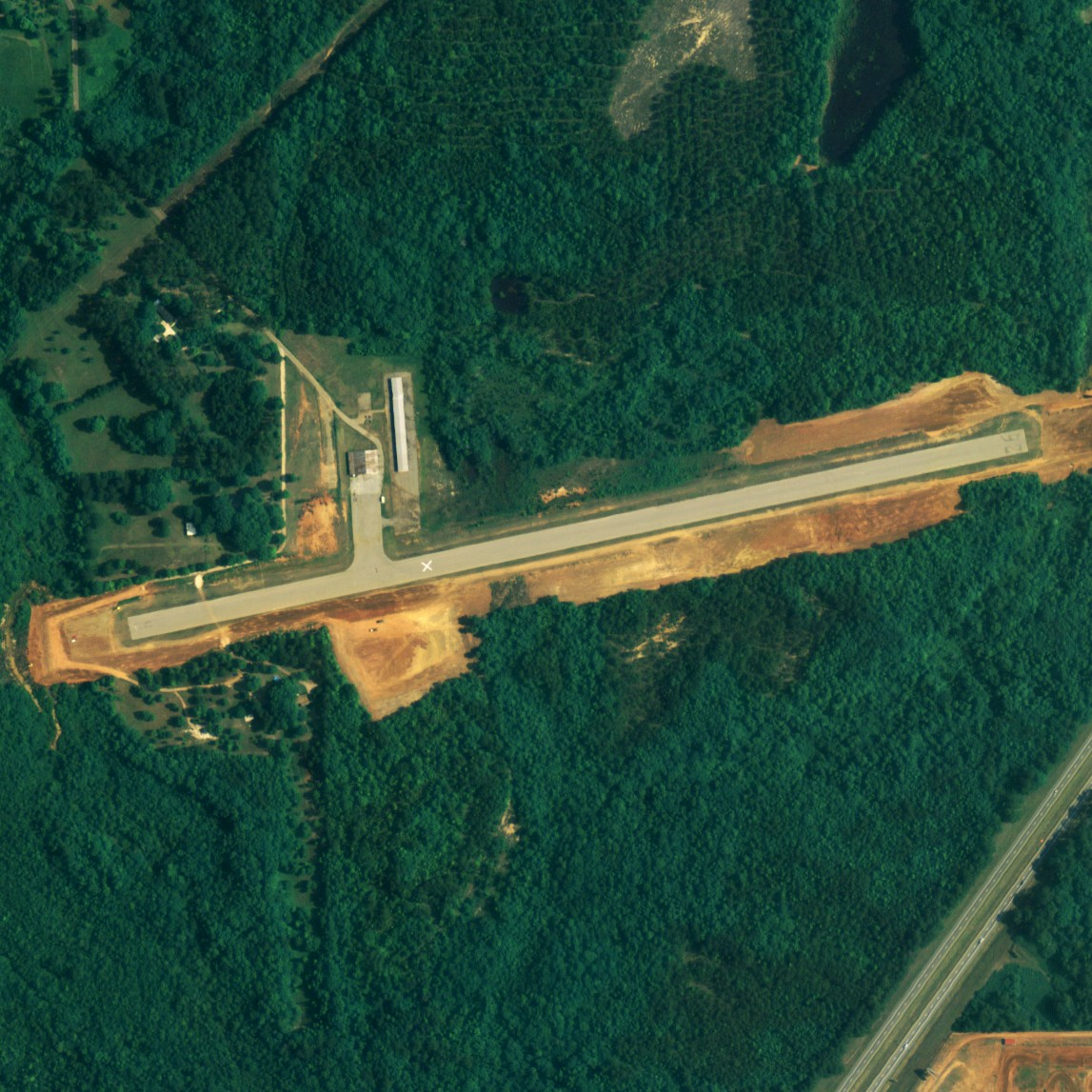
Lanett Municipal Airport

== Airport ==
Lanett Municipal Airport is a city-owned public-use airport located three nautical miles (6 km) southwest of the central business district of Lanett. According to the FAA's National Plan of Integrated Airport Systems for 2009–2013, it is categorized as a general aviation facility.

== Notable people ==
- Desi Barmore (born 1960), American-Israeli basketball player
- Linton Lomas Barrett, educator, editor, Hispanist and translator of Romance languages
- Josh Cooper, professional football defensive end
- John Copeland, former Alabama Crimson Tide NFL player for the Cincinnati Bengals
- Josh Evans, former University of Alabama at Birmingham Blazer player
- Millard Fuller, founder of Habitat for Humanity, graduate of Lanett High School
- Fred Hatfield, former Major League Baseball player
- Hal Herring, former Auburn University and professional football player
- Dave Hill, former Auburn offensive lineman
- Bobby Hunt, former Auburn University defensive back
- Fob James, 48th governor of Alabama, born in Lanett
- Jimmy Johnson, cartoonist
- Walt Landers, former NFL running back
- Jesse Francis McClendon, chemist, zoologist and physiologist
- Marcus Pollard, NFL executive
- John Levi Sheppard, U.S. Representative
- Willie Sims, basketball player
- Dick Wood, former Auburn and AFL quarterback, NFL assistant coach
- Charlie Starr, singer, guitar player and Blackberry Smoke leader
