= Auburn University Regional Airport =

Auburn University Regional Airport Robert G. Pitts Field
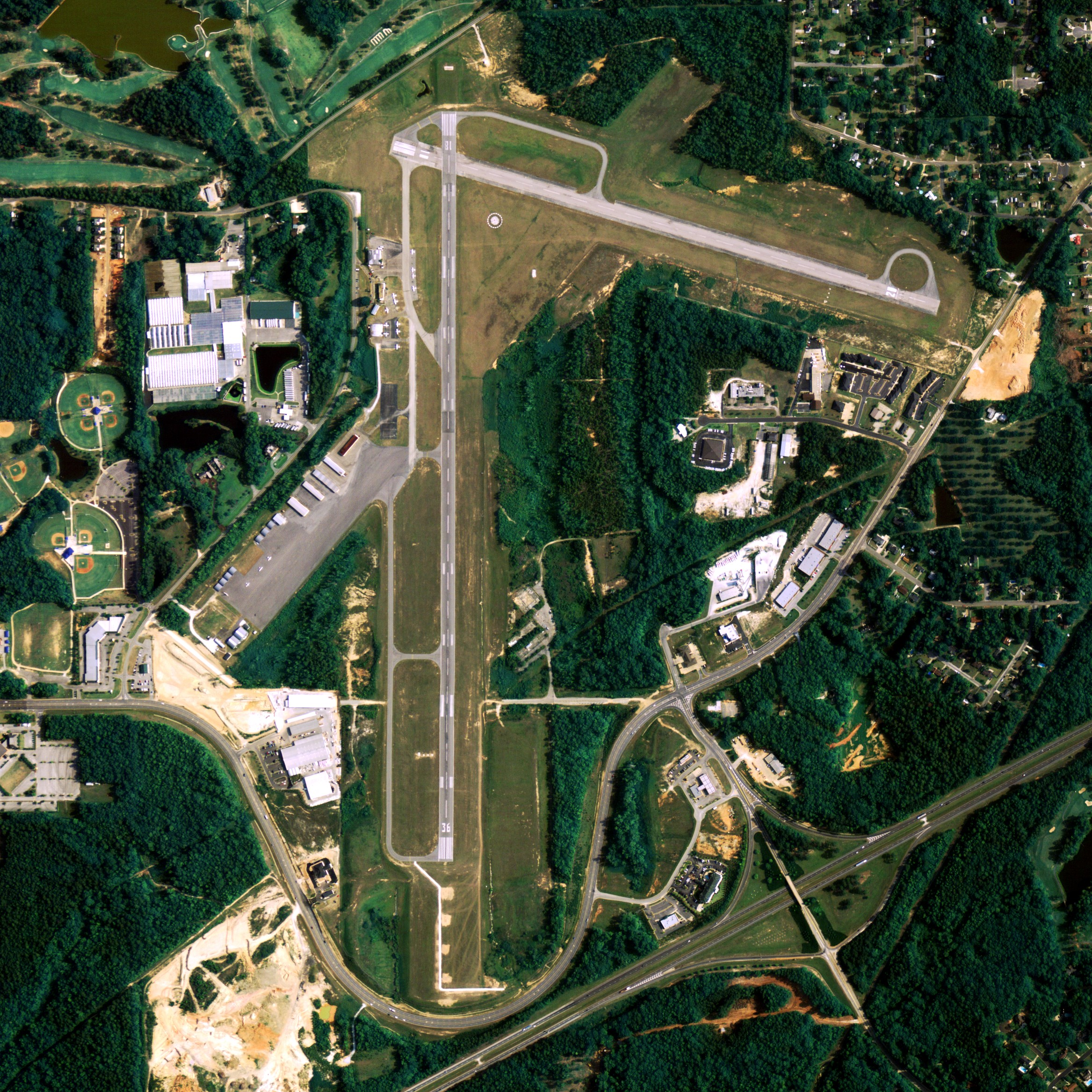
- NAIP aerial image, 2006
- IATA: AUO; ICAO: KAUO; FAA LID: AUO

Summary
- Airport type: Public
- Owner: Auburn University
- Serves: Auburn & Opelika
- Location: Auburn, Alabama
- Elevation AMSL: 777 ft (237 m)
- Coordinates: 32°36′54″N 085°26′02″W
- Website: www.AUOairport.com

Map
- Location of airport in Alabama AUO (the United States)

Runways
Direction	Length		Surface
Direction	ft	m	Surface
18/36	5,264	1,604	Asphalt
11/29	4,000	1,219	Asphalt

Statistics (2021)
- Aircraft operations: 110,422
- Based aircraft: 119
- Source: Federal Aviation Administration USDOT

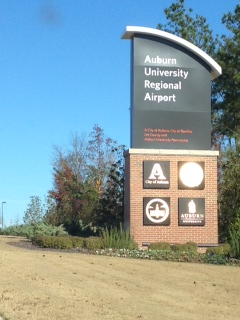
The airport was upgraded in 2010.

Auburn University Regional Airport with the Robert G. Pitts Field (IATA: AUO, ICAO: KAUO, FAA LID: AUO) is a public use airport located two nautical miles (4 km) east of the central business district of Auburn, a city in Lee County, Alabama, United States. The airport is owned by Auburn University and was formerly known as Auburn–Opelika Robert G. Pitts Airport. It is included in the National Plan of Integrated Airport Systems for 2011–2015, which categorized it as a general aviation facility.

The airport offers no commercial service in or out of Auburn. The closest commercial airports are Columbus Airport (40 miles (64 km) via US-280) in Columbus, Georgia; Montgomery Regional Airport (60 miles (97 km) via I-85) in Montgomery, Alabama; the Birmingham–Shuttlesworth International Airport (115 miles (185 km) via US-280) in Birmingham, Alabama; and Hartsfield–Jackson Atlanta International Airport (100 miles (160 km) via I-85) in Atlanta, Georgia.

== History ==
In its earliest days, the airport was nothing more than a grass field. With one airplane, the airport was very different from its current status. Today, the airport is home to some 97 aircraft and Auburn University's Department of Aviation.

When first constructed in 1930, the Auburn–Opelika Airport was a private airfield built to serve the cities of Auburn and Opelika located in Lee County, Alabama. It was also used as a stop along the mail route for the Civil Aeronautics Administration.

In 1939, Alabama Polytechnic Institute, now known as Auburn University, purchased the airport for training pilots for the war effort. During its time as a Navy/CAA war training school, the Auburn School of Aviation would be developed and continue as a civilian school after the war.

Over the next several decades, many improvements were made to the airport in the general aviation field. A new terminal and administration building was constructed in 1950, consisting of both enclosed and open flight decks, a restaurant, flight ready rooms, classrooms, and operations offices with local, state, and federal funds. Also in the 1950s, medium-intensity runway lights were installed, runways were resealed, and an access road to Glenn Avenue was constructed.

The 1960s continued to see major improvements to the airport; pavement for aircraft parking was completed along with the reconstruction of the 18/36 and 11/29 runways and taxiways. During the 1970s, 1980s and 1990s a concentrated effort was made to acquire the land and funding for the 18/36 runway extension. Renovations and several improvements were made to the airport facilities, updating them to modern standards.

In January 2002, a ribbon-cutting ceremony was held to open the 1,332-foot (406 m) runway extension. It was extended from 3,933 feet (1,199 m) to 5,265 feet (1,605 m) and was widened from 75 feet (23 m) to 100 feet (30 m).

As of August 2006, the Federal Aviation Administration gave clearance for the installation of a glideslope antenna and approach lighting system (MALSF) for runway 36. These improvements were completed in late 2007. Plans are being made for extensive crack repair, pavement rehab, and painting of runway 11/29, along with minor crack repair and repainting of runway 18/36.

Site prep work for four hangars, a new ramp area, and a new terminal was started in January 2008. These improvements will help the airport provide better service for the large crowds of people who fly in to attend college football games at Auburn University.

In November 2009, the Auburn University Board of Trustees voted to rename the Auburn-Opelika Robert G. Pitts Airport as the Auburn University Regional Airport with the Robert G. Pitts Field.

A new terminal was dedicated in September, 2010.

In July, 2018, the old FBO (serving as the flight education building) was demolished shortly before the newly constructed Delta Air Lines Aviation Education Building was dedicated and opened. That same year, the WWII era hangar and maintenance facilities were demolished and taxiway A, parallel to Runway 18/36, was shifted further west to meet FAA design standards.

In August 2024, a new Temporary Air Traffic Control Tower building was constructed on the grounds of the airport, transitioning the field from a non-towered airport to a controlled field during operating hours.

Former airport logo

== Facilities and aircraft ==
Auburn University Regional Airport covers an area of 423 acres (171 ha) at an elevation of 777 feet (237 m) above mean sea level. It has two runways with asphalt surfaces: 18/36 is 5,264 by 100 feet (1,604 x 30 m) and 11/29 is 4,000 by 75 feet (1,219 x 23 m).

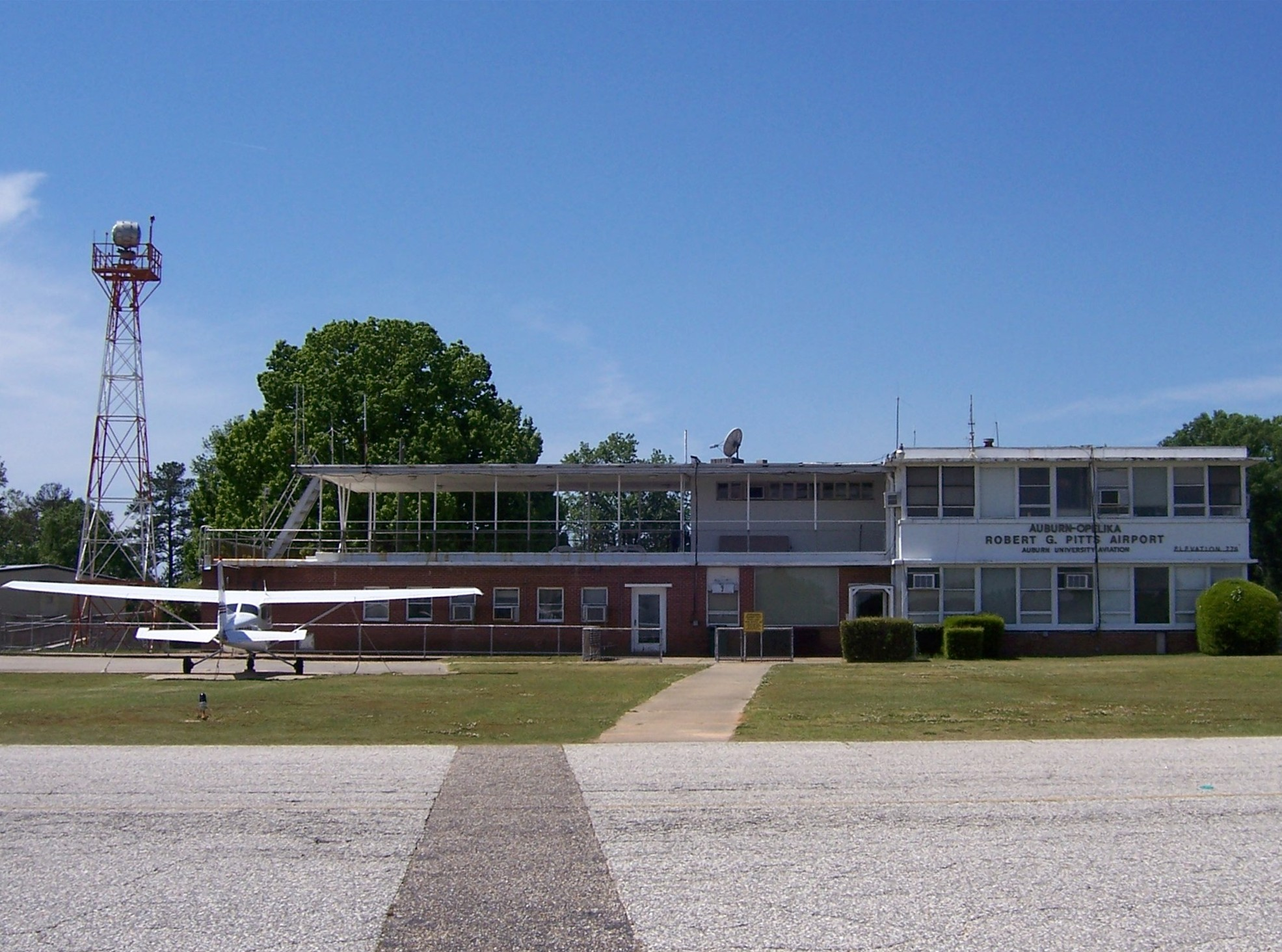
The old FBO

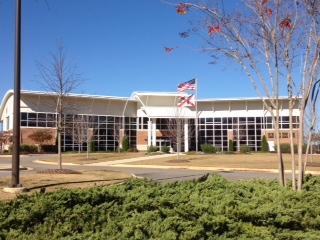
The new airport terminal was dedicated in September, 2010.

For the 12-month period ending December 31, 2021, the airport had 110,422 aircraft operations, an average of 302 per day: 96% general aviation, 4% air taxi, and <1% military.

At that time there were 119 aircraft based at this airport: 93 single-engine, 22 multi-engine, and 4 jet.

The FBO at the Auburn University Regional Airport is staffed from 7:00 AM to 7:00 PM Central Time (-5, -6z) weekdays, 8:00 AM to 5:00 PM weekends. Fuel services are available during this time, as are use of the FBO and airport facilities. There are additional charges or "call fees" for after hours assistance for fuel or supplies. Services include WSI weather, courtesy cars, aircraft maintenance, oxygen, nitrogen, GPU availability, vending, cable TV, computer workstations, wired and wireless Internet, and LAV service.

Maintenance is available during normal working hours, from 7 AM to 4 PM local time. AUO's four mechanics, three of whom have their Inspection Authorization License (IA), can service most all single engine, twin engine, and turbo-prop aircraft, but provide only minor powerplant and airframe service. After hours and weekend service is available on demand at a rate of time and a half.

Air Traffic Control is available Monday through Friday from 07:00am to 09:00pm Central time as well as Saturday and Sunday from 08:00AM to 05:00 PM.

== Pilot information ==
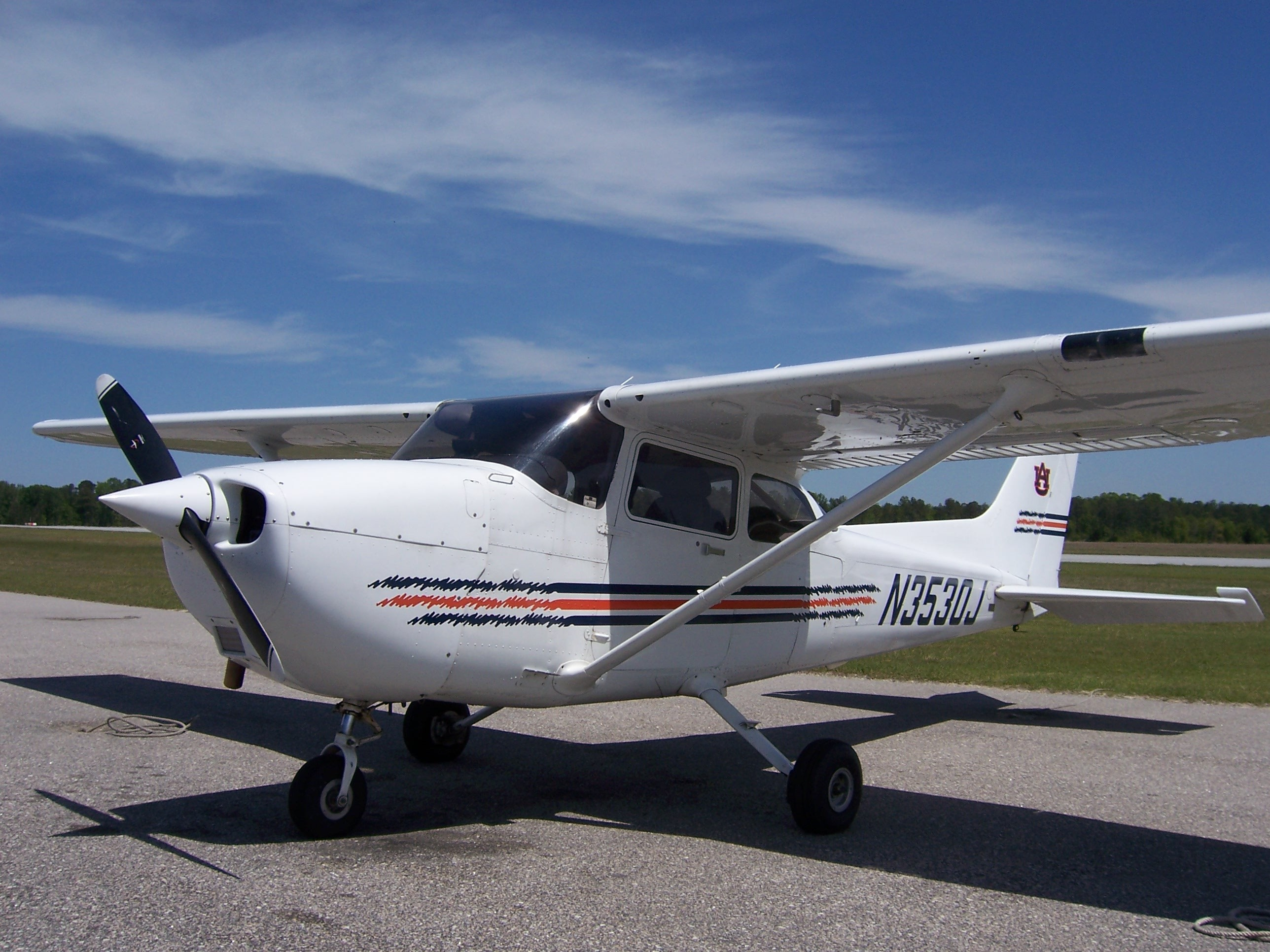
One of thirty-five Cessna 172 Skyhawks operated by Auburn University's Department of Aviation Management

Navaids

- TGE 117.3 055 14.4 nm to field
- CSG 117.1 269 20.6 nm to field
- LOC IAUO 110.1

Airport communications

- Tower: 123.875
- Ground: 121.625
- CTAF/UNICOM: 123.0
- WX AWOS-3: 132.575 (334-821-4932)
- ATLANTA approach: 126.55 (7000 & above)
- ATLANTA departure: 126.55 (7000 & above)
- APP/P DEP/P: 125.5 (6999 & below)
- Clearance delivery: 118.7

General airport services

- Available fuel:
  - 100LL
  - Jet-A
- Parking includes hangars & tiedowns
- MINOR service
  - Airframe
  - Powerplant

== See also ==
- List of airports in Alabama
