= Fluvial shiner =

Conservation status
- Least Concern (IUCN 3.1)

Scientific classification
- Kingdom: Animalia
- Phylum: Chordata
- Class: Actinopterygii
- Order: Cypriniformes
- Family: Leuciscidae
- Subfamily: Pogonichthyinae
- Genus: Alburnops
- Species: A. edwardraneyi

Binomial name
- Alburnops edwardraneyi Suttkus & Clemmer, 1968

Synonyms
- Notropis edwardraneyi Suttkus & Clemer, 1968

Species of fish

The fluvial shiner (Alburnops edwardraneyi) is a species of freshwater ray-finned fish in the family Leuciscidae, the shiners, daces and minnows. It is endemic to the United States, where it is found in the Mobile Bay drainage in Alabama and Mississippi, mostly in main channels of Tombigbee, Black Warrior, Cahaba, and Alabama rivers, almost exclusively below the Fall Line.
