= Orangetail shiner =

Conservation status
- Near Threatened (IUCN 3.1)

Scientific classification
- Kingdom: Animalia
- Phylum: Chordata
- Class: Actinopterygii
- Order: Cypriniformes
- Family: Leuciscidae
- Subfamily: Pogonichthyinae
- Genus: Pteronotropis
- Species: P. merlini

Binomial name
- Pteronotropis merlini (Suttkus & Mettee, 2001)

Synonyms
- Notropis merlini Suttkus & Mettee, 2001

Species of fish

The orangetail shiner (Pteronotropis merlini) is a species of freshwater ray-finned fish belonging to the family Leuciscidae, the shiners, daces and minnows. This species is endemic to the southeastern United States. It is endemic to in the Choctawhatchee River drainage in southeastern Alabama.

== Description ==
The fish is similar to the sailfin shiner. It has a very deep and compressed body. It has between 35 and 42 scales along the lateral line. It has a maximum total length of 6.5 cm (2.5 in).

It usually has 10 anal rays. Breeding males have a chevron-shaped black blotch at the origin of the caudal fin separated from a dark black stripe along the side, and have orange caudal and anal fins.

== Distribution and habitat ==
This is the only fish found exclusively in Alabama, primarily upland in the Choctawhatchee River system before it merges with the Pea River.

Orangetail shiners are found in sand-bottomed and silt-bottomed creeks and small rivers. It is often found among debris and undercut banks. It is found in bodies with reduced current, usually under overhanging banks or overhanging vegetation, or around roots or stumps. The fish prefers temperatures from 12°C (54°F) to 23°C (73°F).
