= Liddell Archeological Site =

Archaeological site in Alabama, United States

- U.S. National Register of Historic Places
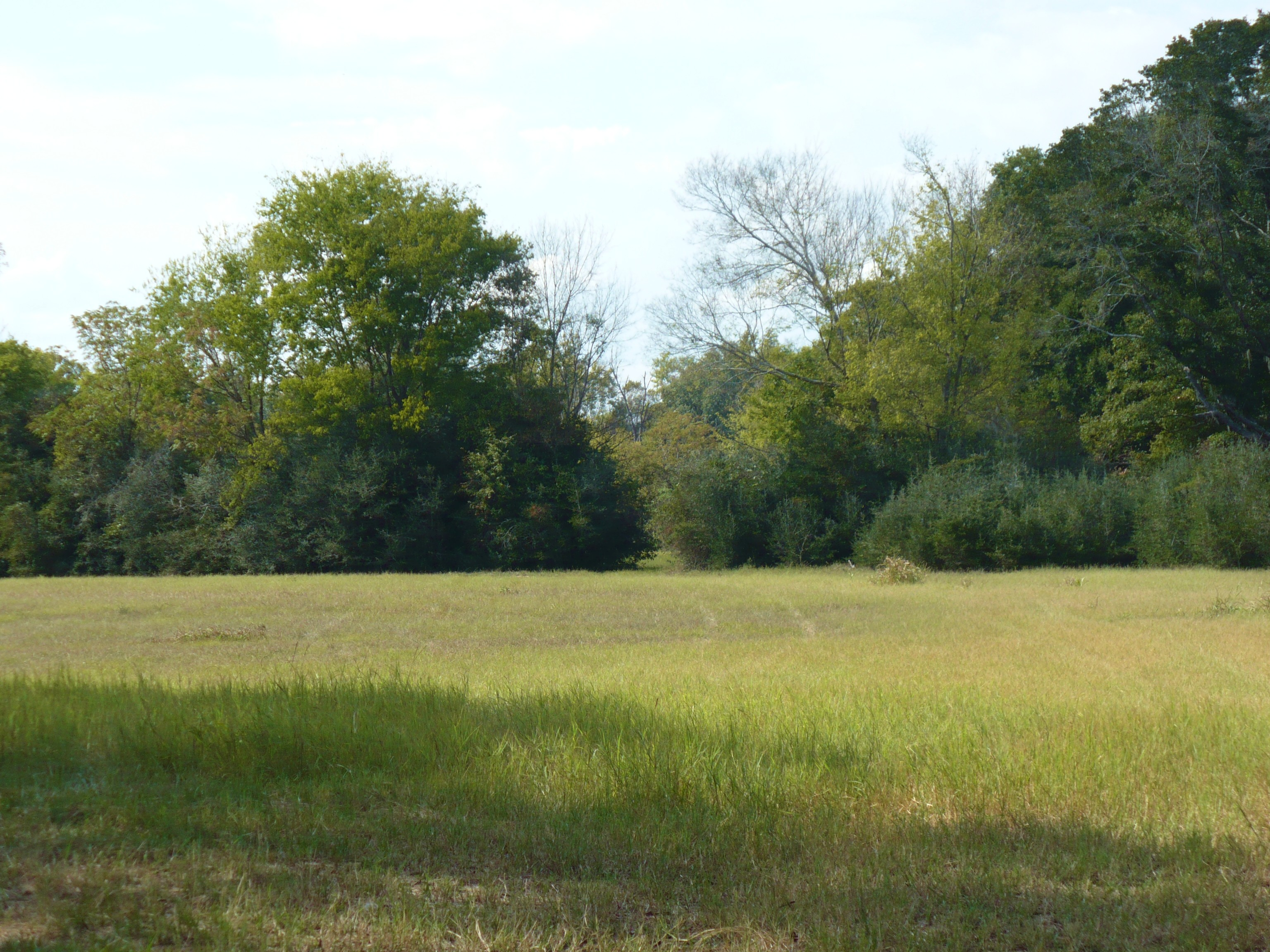
- The site in 2010
- Nearest city: Camden, Alabama
- NRHP reference No.: 78000511
- Added to NRHP: November 17, 1978

The Liddell Archeological Site is a prehistoric Native American site in Wilcox County, Alabama. The site covers 50 acres (20 ha) and shows evidence of human occupation from 9000 BC to 1800 AD. It is best known for its Mississippian artifacts, primarily from the Burial Urn Culture period. The site was first documented in the 1960s, when the United States Army Corps of Engineers constructed Millers Ferry Lock and Dam on the Alabama River, creating the William "Bill" Dannelly Reservoir. The Liddell, Stroud, and Hall families donated the site to Auburn University after its discovery. It was added to the National Register of Historic Places on November 17, 1978.
