= Burrhead shiner =

Conservation status
- Least Concern (IUCN 3.1)

- Apparently Secure (NatureServe)

Scientific classification
- Kingdom: Animalia
- Phylum: Chordata
- Class: Actinopterygii
- Order: Cypriniformes
- Family: Leuciscidae
- Subfamily: Pogonichthyinae
- Genus: Alburnops
- Species: A. asperifrons

Binomial name
- Alburnops asperifrons (Suttkus & Raney, 1955)

Synonyms
- Notropis asperifrons Suttkus & Raney, 1955

Species of fish

The burrhead shiner (Alburnops asperifrons) is a species of freshwater ray-finned fish in the family Leuciscidae, the shiners, daces and minnows. It is endemic to the United States and occurs in the Alabama and Black Warrior River systems in southeastern Tennessee, northwestern Georgia, and Alabama, mostly above the Fall Line. It grows to 7.5 cm (3.0 in) total length. It can be locally common and occurs in rocky and sandy pools and runs of clear creeks and small rivers, usually on or near bottom. It is state threatened in Georgia, however.
