= Rough shiner =

Conservation status
- Least Concern (IUCN 3.1)

Scientific classification
- Kingdom: Animalia
- Phylum: Chordata
- Class: Actinopterygii
- Order: Cypriniformes
- Family: Leuciscidae
- Subfamily: Pogonichthyinae
- Genus: Alburnops
- Species: A. baileyi

Binomial name
- Alburnops baileyi (Suttkus & Raney, 1955)

Synonyms
- Notropis baileyi Suttkus & Raney, 1955

Species of fish

The rough shiner (Alburnops baileyi) is a species of freshwater ray-finned fish in the family Leuciscidae, the shiners, daces and minnows. It is endemic to the United States, where it is found in the upper Coastal Plain and Piedmont areas from Leaf and Chickasawhay rivers of the Pascagoula River drainage in Mississippi, east through the Mobile Bay drainage in Alabama to the lower Tallapoosa River system, and the Bear Creek system in the Tennessee River drainage.
