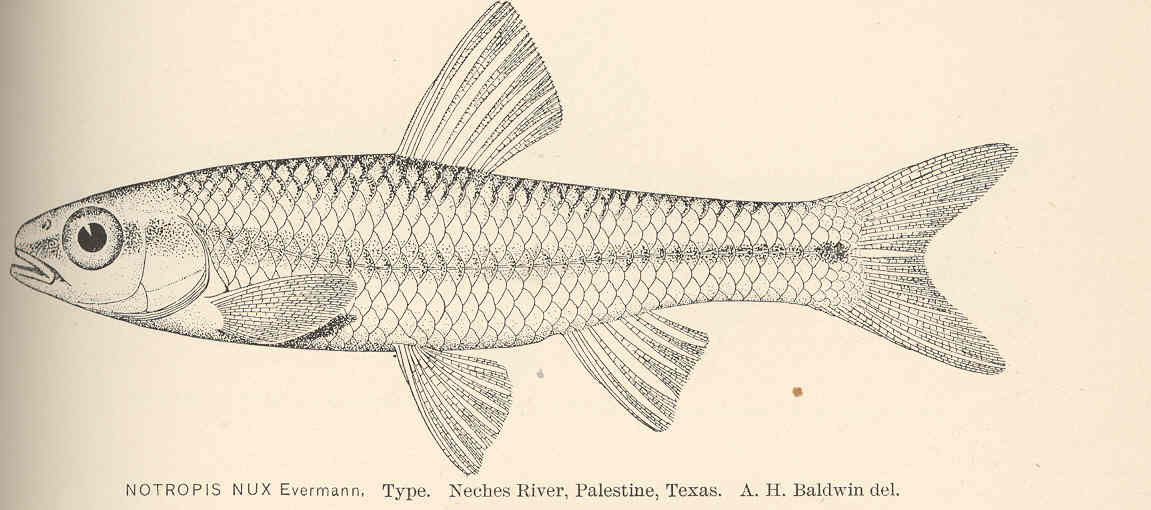

Conservation status
- Least Concern (IUCN 3.1)

Scientific classification
- Kingdom: Animalia
- Phylum: Chordata
- Class: Actinopterygii
- Order: Cypriniformes
- Family: Leuciscidae
- Subfamily: Pogonichthyinae
- Genus: Alburnops
- Species: A. texanus

Binomial name
- Alburnops texanus (Girard, 1856)

Synonyms
- Cyprinella texana Girard, 1856; Notropis texanus (Girard 1856); Moniana deliciosa Girard, 1856; Luxilus roseus D. S. Jordan, 1877; Notropis nux Evermann, 1892; Notropis heterodon richardsoni C. L. Hubbs & Greene, 1926; Hudsonius aletes D. S. Jordan & Evermann, 1927

= Weed shiner =

Species of fish

The weed shiner (Alburnops texanus) is a species of freshwater ray-finned fish in the family Leuciscidae, the shiners, daces and minnows. Prior to 1958, this species was named Notropis roseus.

== Description ==
The weed shiner, Alburnops texanus, is a member of the family Cyprinidae. It is a medium-sized minnow with a broad, dark lateral band down and a dark spot at the base of the caudal fin. The posterior 3–4 anal rays often have a dark pigment. Weed shiners have a somewhat compressed body, a large terminal to subterminal mouth, a gently rounded snout, and an eye diameter less than or equal to its snout length. The lateral line system is completely pored with 34–36 scales and is slightly decurved anteriorly. The dorsal surface of this fish tends to be olive-yellow with a silvery overlay and has dark-edged scales, giving off a checkerboard appearance. The ventral surface is white with silver tones. Weed shiners have a total of 6–8 gill rakers, 8 dorsal rays, 7 anal rays, 13–14 pectoral rays, and 8 pelvic rays.

== Diet ==
Weed shiners feed during the day, with peaks in activity after sunrise or during mid-afternoon. During the wet season, their diet is mostly composed of organic detritus (81% by volume). During the wet season, their diet includes surface animal prey (20% by volume), midwater prey (5%), benthic animal prey (39%), and organic detritus (35%).

== Habitat ==
Weed shiners are commonly found in the lower third of the water column in small to moderate sized streams of slow to moderate flow. They can be found in man-made ponds, reservoirs, and natural oxbow lakes. Despite its name, these fish are prevalent in both vegetated and non-vegetated waterways.

== Reproduction and life cycle ==
Weed shiners spawn from March through September (sometimes early October), in water temperatures between 14 and 29 °C. Female weed shiners produce multiple clutches of eggs during the breeding season; therefore, it is hard to accurately estimate annual egg production.

Larval development has not yet been described in weed shiners. Growth of this species is very rapid in the beginning stages of development. They reach about 60% of their maximum length after one year of growth. Although some weed shiners manage to reach their fourth year of life, most of them die after their third year of life.

== Distribution ==
The weed shiner occurs in the Mississippi River Basin from Minnesota and Wisconsin down to the Gulf of Mexico. It ranges all throughout Gulf of Mexico drainage, from the Suwannee River of Florida and Georgia to the Nueces River of Texas, and is more abundant south of the Ohio-Tennessee River confluences. It has also been reported in the Red River of the North drainage in Minnesota and drainages of Lake Michigan and Lake Huron.

== Etymology ==
Texanus is a reference to the type locality, Salado Creek, Texas.

== See also ==
- Shiner (fish)
