= Silverside shiner =

Conservation status
- Least Concern (IUCN 3.1)

- Apparently Secure (NatureServe)

Scientific classification
- Kingdom: Animalia
- Phylum: Chordata
- Class: Actinopterygii
- Order: Cypriniformes
- Family: Leuciscidae
- Subfamily: Pogonichthyinae
- Genus: Alburnops
- Species: A. candidus

Binomial name
- Alburnops candidus (Suttkus, 1980)

Synonyms
- Notropis candidus Suttkus, 1980

Species of fish

The Silverside shiner (Alburnops candidus) is a species of freshwater ray-finned fish in the family Leuciscidae, the shiners, daces and minnows. It is endemic to the southern United States and occurs in the Mobile Basin in Alabama and Mississippi. It occurs in sand-gravel runs of medium to large rivers. It lives in small schools, escaping to deeper water when disturbed. It grows to 11 cm (4.3 in) total length, although is commonly only half of that size.
