= Shiner (fish) =

Shiner is a common name used in North America for any of several kinds of small, iridescent (usually gold- or silver-hued) freshwater ray-finned fish in the suborder Cyprinoidei, particularly species in the family Leuciscidae, but also the eponymously-named yet unrelated, shiner perch (Cymatogaster aggregata) of the order Blenniformes.

Shiners fall into several genera (excluding the shiner perch):

Family Leuciscidae:

- Eastern shiners, genus Notropis
- Finescale shiners, genus Lythrurus
- Flagfin shiners, genus Pteronotropis
- Golden shiner, Notemigonus crysoleucas (a monotypic genus)
- Highscale shiners, genus Luxilus
- Redside shiners, genus Richardsonius
- Satinfin shiners, genus Cyprinella
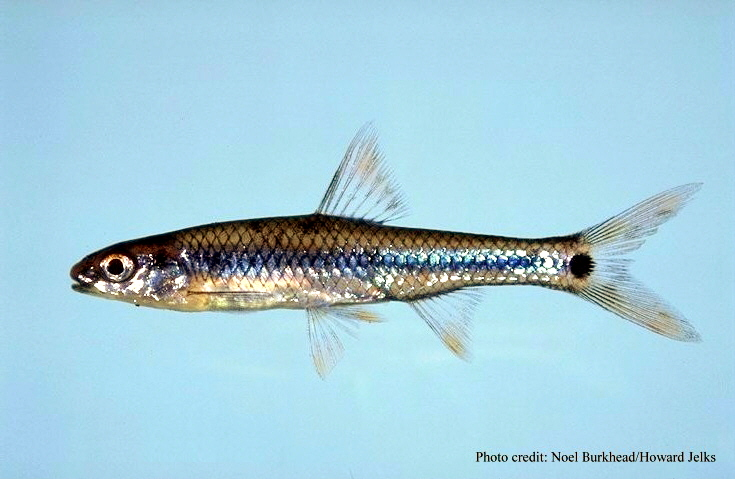
Notropis maculatus, an eastern shiner

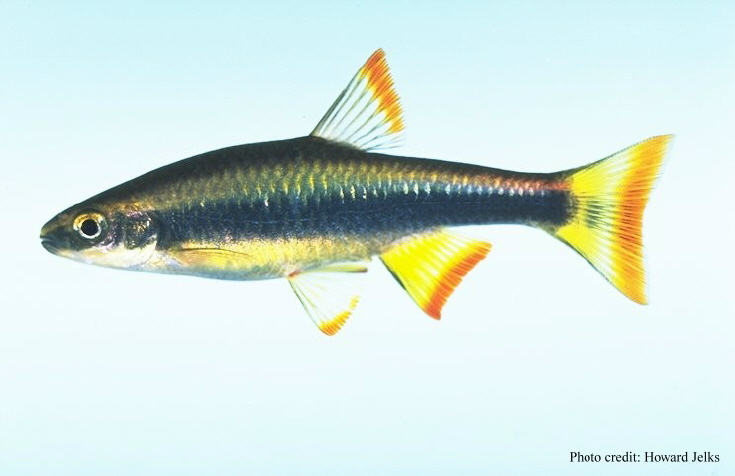
Flagfin shiner (Pteronotropis signipinnis)

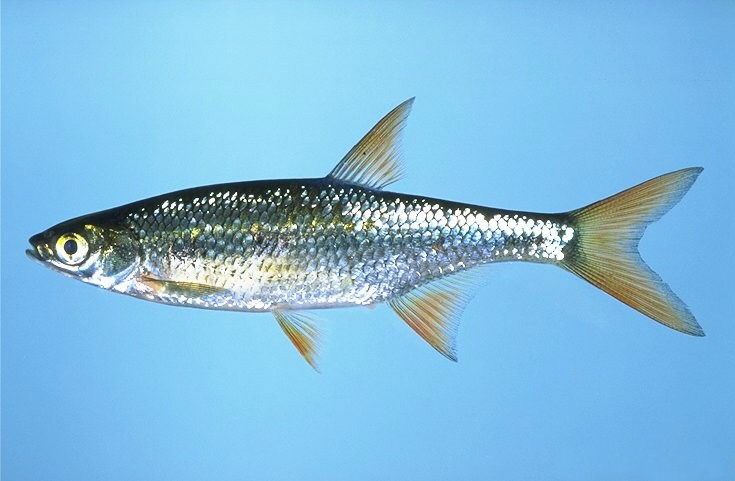
Golden shiner (Notemigonus crysoleucas)

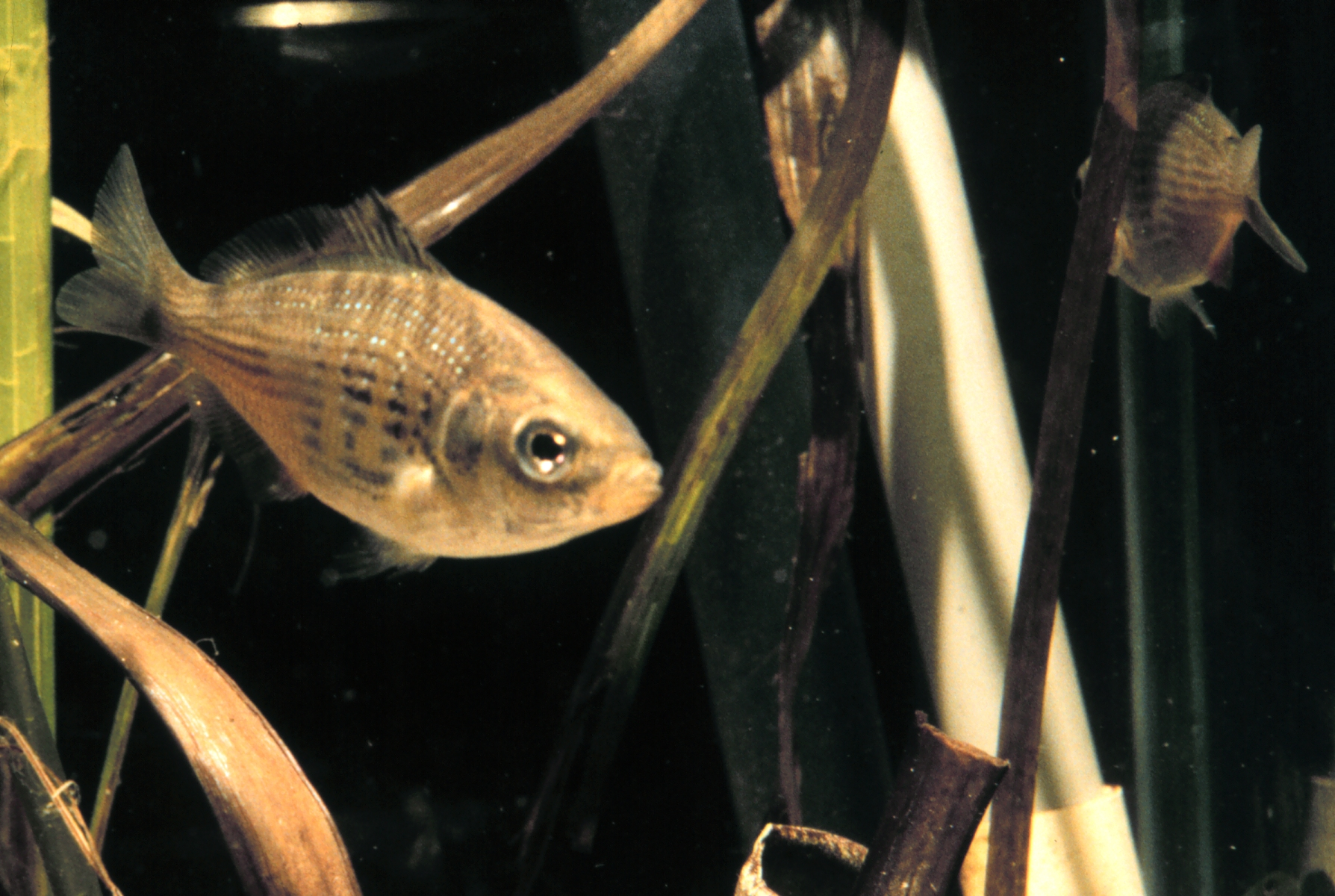
Shiner perch (Cymatogaster aggregata)

== See also ==
- Chub (disambiguation)
- Dace (disambiguation)
- Minnow
- Roach (disambiguation)
