= Highscale shiner =

Conservation status
- Near Threatened (IUCN 3.1)

Scientific classification
- Kingdom: Animalia
- Phylum: Chordata
- Class: Actinopterygii
- Order: Cypriniformes
- Family: Leuciscidae
- Subfamily: Pogonichthyinae
- Genus: Alburnops
- Species: A. hypsilepis

Binomial name
- Alburnops hypsilepis (Suttkus & Raney, 1955)

Synonyms
- Notropis hypsilepis Suttkus & Raney, 1955

Species of fish

The highscale shiner (Alburnops hypsilepis) is a species of freshwater ray-finned fish in the family Leuciscidae, the shiners, daces and minnows. It is endemic to the United States where it is found in sandy-bottomed tributary streams of the Chattahoochee and Flint river systems in Georgia and eastern Alabama. They were also historically found in the uppermost reaches of the Savannah river drainage.
