= Prairie Bluff, Alabama =

Unincorporated community in Alabama, United States

- Ghost town
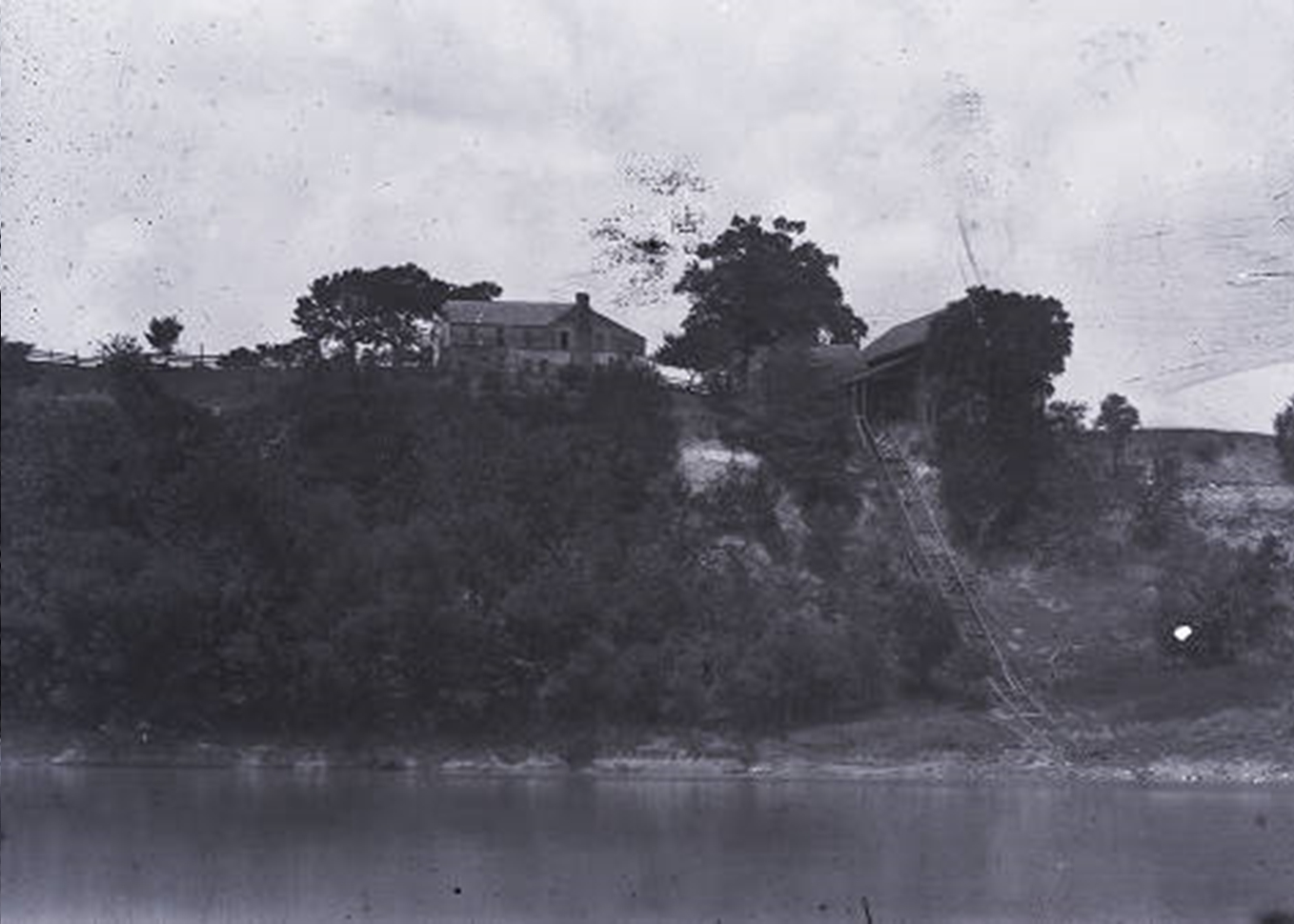
- Prairie Bluff, taken from the Alabama River in 1894. Some buildings and the cotton slide were still present at this time.

- Location within the state of Alabama Prairie Bluff, Alabama (the United States)
- Coordinates: 32°8′3.52″N 87°24′12.99″W
- Country: United States
- State: Alabama
- County: Wilcox
- Elevation: 141 ft (43 m)
- Time zone: UTC-6 (Central (CST))
  - Summer (DST): UTC-5 (CDT)
- Area code: 334

Prairie Bluff, also known as Dale and Daletown, is a ghost town in Wilcox County, Alabama.

== History ==
Prairie Bluff first appeared on maps in 1819, the same year that Alabama was admitted to the Union as a state. It was listed erroneously as Prairie Blue on Fielding Lucas' Geographic, Statistical, and Historical Map of Alabama, printed in Philadelphia in 1822. However, another of Lucas' Alabama maps, also printed in 1822, lists it as Prairie Bluff. It is interchangeably listed as Dale, Daletown, or Prairie Bluff on subsequent maps from the 1830s until the mid-1850s, after which time Prairie Bluff is the only name used. It disappeared from maps altogether around 1900. The historic Greek-Revival style Dale Masonic Lodge No. 25 in Camden, completed in 1848, was originally established in what was known as Dale during 1827. The members voted to move their lodge during the 1840s to the county seat in Camden, incorporated in 1842. The county seat had been a short distance from Prairie Bluff, in the community of Canton Bend, until moved to Barboursville (later renamed Camden) in 1833.

The town was located at the midpoint of an early road that connected Cahaba, the first state capital, and St. Stephens, the territorial capital. Situated atop a cliff overlooking the Alabama River, the town grew as river trade increased. A large cotton slide, used to move bales of cotton from the top of the cliff to paddle steamers on the river below, was located at the site. The steamboat Pittsburg sank near Prairie Bluff in May 1828, followed by the Jewess on October 28, 1841.

The town was at its height in 1861, but declined rapidly in importance with the introduction of new railroads following the American Civil War. Portions of the site were inundated by the William "Bill" Dannelly Reservoir with the construction of the nearby Millers Ferry Lock and Dam in 1963. The only physical feature that remains at the site today is the Prairie Bluff Cemetery, with marked graves dating from the 1830s to the 1860s.

== Geography ==
The site of Prairie Bluff is located at 32.1343111°N 87.4036071°W, it has an elevation of 141 feet (43 m). The site is located on an exposed portion of the Prairie Bluff Chalk Formation, a geological formation that was named after the town.

== Notable native ==
- William H. Gaston, Dallas landowner and co-founder of the first banking house in the city of Dallas
- William Q. Atwood, Saginaw, Michigan lumber baron was born at Shell Creek plantation near Prairie Bluff.
- Mrs. I. Lowenberg, author, clubwoman, reformer, socialite

== See also ==
- Ghost town
