= Dannelly =

Dannelly is a surname. Notable people with the surname include:

- Brian Dannelly, American film director and screenwriter
- Charlie Smith Dannelly (1924–2026), American politician

== See also ==
- Donnelly (surname)
- William "Bill" Dannelly Reservoir, reservoir in Alabama, United States
