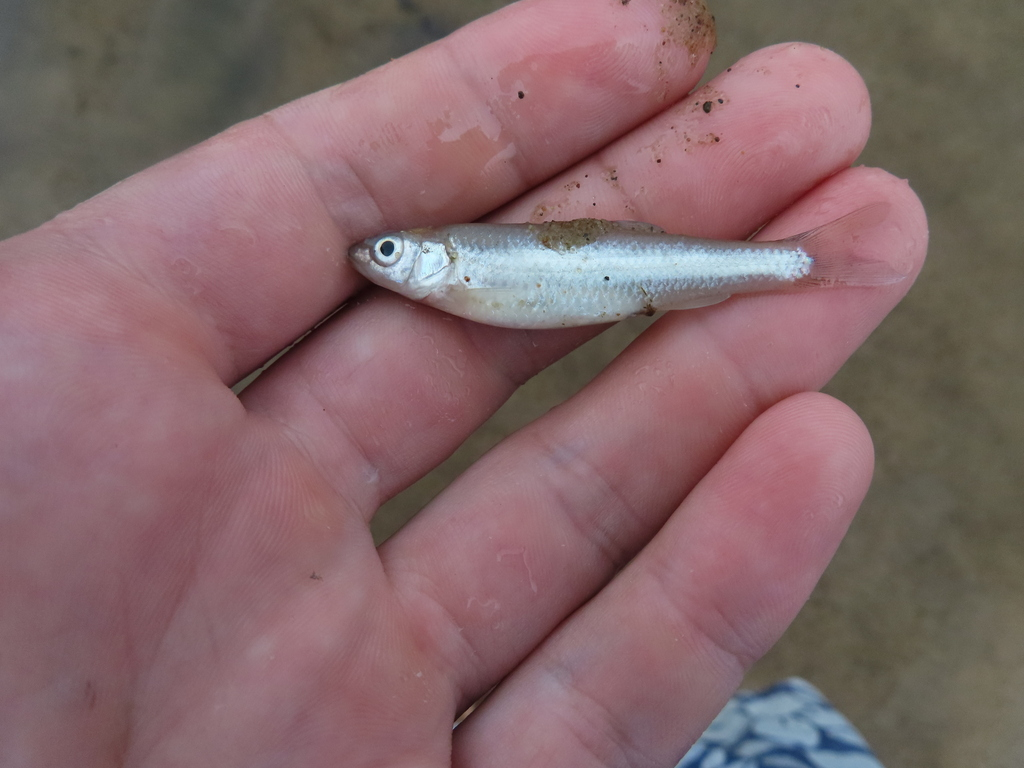
- River shiner (Alburnops blennius)

Scientific classification
- Kingdom: Animalia
- Phylum: Chordata
- Class: Actinopterygii
- Order: Cypriniformes
- Family: Leuciscidae
- Subfamily: Pogonichthyinae
- Genus: Alburnops; Girard, 1856

Type species
- Alburnops blennius Girard, 1856

= Alburnops =

Genus of fishes

Alburnops is a genus of freshwater ray-finned fish belonging to the subfamily Pogonichthyinae of the family Leuciscidae, the shiners, minnows, daces and related fishes. The fishes in this genus are found in North America.

== Species ==
Alburnops contains the following species:

- Alburnops aguirrepequenoi Contreras-Balderas & Rivera-Tiellery, 1973 (Soto la Marina shiner)
- Alburnops asperifrons Suttkus & Raney, 1990 (Orangefin shiner)
- Alburnops baileyi (Suttkus & Raney, 1955) (Rough shiner)
- Alburnops blennius Girard, 1856 (River shiner)
- Alburnops braytoni D. S. Jordan & Evermann, 1896 (Tamaulipas shiner)
- Alburnops candidus (Suttkus, 1980 (Silverside shiner)
- Alburnops chalybaeus (Cope, 1867) (Ironcolor shiner)
- Alburnops edwardraneyi (Suttkus & Clemmer, 1968 (Fluvial shiner)
- Alburnops hypsilepis (Suttkus & Raney, 1955) (Highscale shiner)
- †Alburnops orca Woolman, 1894 (Phantom shiner)
- Alburnops petersoni Fowler, 1942 (Coastal shiner)
- Alburnops potteri C. L. Hubbs & Bonham, 1951 (Chub shiner)
- Alburnops simus (Cope, 1875) (Bluntnose shiner)
- Alburnops texanus (Girard, 1856) (Weed shiner)
- Alburnops xaenocephalus (D. S. Jordan, 1877) (Coosa shiner)
