= Broadstripe shiner =

Conservation status
- Least Concern (IUCN 3.1)

Scientific classification
- Kingdom: Animalia
- Phylum: Chordata
- Class: Actinopterygii
- Order: Cypriniformes
- Family: Leuciscidae
- Subfamily: Pogonichthyinae
- Genus: Pteronotropis
- Species: P. euryzonus

Binomial name
- Pteronotropis euryzonus (Suttkus, 1955)

Synonyms
- Notropis euryzonus Suttkus, 1955

Species of fish

The broadstripe shiner (Pteronotropis euryzonus) is a species of freshwater ray-finned fish belonging to the family Leuciscidae, the shiners, daces and minnows. This species is endemic to the Chattahoochee River drainage in the states of Georgia and Alabama in the United States. It is recorded in freshwater and lives in a benthopelagic environment. The climate that they are known to be found in is temperate. The distribution of this species is within North America and in the middle Chattahoochee River drainage. They occupy clay, sand and bedrock pools of headwaters, creeks, and small rivers. It is common to find this species within the vegetation. The average length of the broadstripe shiner as an unsexed male is about 7 centimeters or about 2 inches.

== Notes ==
- Froese, Rainer; Pauly, Daniel (eds.). "Pteronotropis euryzonus". FishBase. August 2011 version.
