= Bluehead shiner =

Conservation status
- Near Threatened (IUCN 3.1)

Scientific classification
- Kingdom: Animalia
- Phylum: Chordata
- Class: Actinopterygii
- Order: Cypriniformes
- Family: Leuciscidae
- Subfamily: Pogonichthyinae
- Genus: Pteronotropis
- Species: P. hubbsi

Binomial name
- Pteronotropis hubbsi (Bailey & Robison, 1978)

Synonyms
- Notropis hubbsi Bailey & Robison, 1978

Species of fish

The bluehead shiner (Pteronotropis hubbsi) is a species of freshwater ray-finned fish belonging to the family Leuciscidae, the shiners, daces and minnows. It is endemic to the central United States, where it is found in Arkansas, Louisiana, Texas, and Oklahoma. It was also once known from Illinois.

In 2014, the status changed from Data Deficient to Near Threatened. It is threatened by draining, filling, farming and flooding of backwater swamp habitat and overcollection for the aquarium trade.

== Description ==
This minnow grows up to about 60 mm (2.4 in) in maximum length. It is a dusky reddish orange along the back with a lighter belly. The chin is black and the top of the head is blue with a green iridescence. The larger males have some iridescence on the dark dorsal fin. There is a broad, dark lateral stripe from the chin to the tail base. The mouth is upturned. The lateral line is incomplete.

This species is closely related to Pteronotropis welaka, and the two form a monophyletic group.

== Distribution ==
This fish lives in several drainages emptying into the Mississippi River, including the Ouachita and Atchafalaya Rivers. It has not been collected in Illinois since the 1970s and is likely extirpated there.

== Biology ==
The species is sexually dimorphic, with females lacking the iridescent blue coloration of the males. The males change in appearance as they age. In its "non-flag" or "initial" phase, a male is small with a shiny blue head and fins. When it enters its "flag" or "terminal" phase the following year, the male is larger with a deeper body and dark vertical bars along its sides, and its blue coloration fades.

The terminal males are aggressive and territorial. Females are sexually mature at one year of age and spawn in May through July, probably producing multiple clutches. The yellow-orange eggs are up to 1.2 millimeters wide and are adhesive on the substrate. Spawning activity has not been observed in nature. This species sometimes shares nesting sites with sunfishes such as the warmouth (Lepomis gulosus). The male minnow may defend the nest site.

The life span of the fish is generally less than two years.

Adults of this species eat mainly tiny crustaceans such as water fleas and copepods, as well as chironomid fly larvae. Juvenile minnows may also eat rotifers, nematodes, diatoms, and algae.

The fish lives in slow-moving and stagnant waters in muddy and sandy well-vegetated habitat types where there are hiding spots.
