= Palaemon cummingi =

Squirrel Chimney Cave shrimp

Conservation status
- Critically endangered, possibly extinct (IUCN 3.1)

- Threatened (ESA)

Scientific classification
- Kingdom: Animalia
- Phylum: Arthropoda
- Clade: Pancrustacea
- Class: Malacostraca
- Order: Decapoda
- Suborder: Pleocyemata
- Infraorder: Caridea
- Family: Palaemonidae
- Genus: Palaemon
- Species: P. cummingi

Binomial name
- Palaemon cummingi (Chace, 1954)
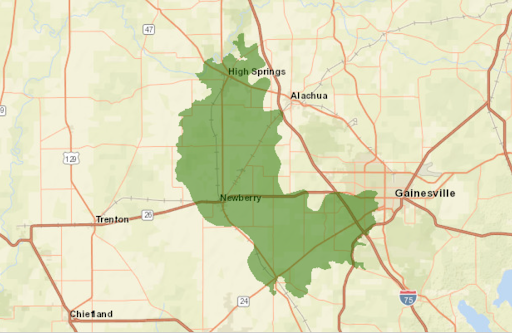

Synonyms
- Palaemonetes cummingi Chace, 1954

Species of crustacean

Palaemon cummingi, known as the Squirrel Chimney Cave shrimp or the Florida cave shrimp, is a threatened species of cave-dwelling shrimp in the family Palaemonidae. P. cummingi has been observed in one sinkhole called Squirrel Chimney in Alachua County, Florida near Gainesville. Although exact numbers are unknown, it is speculated that the current P. cummingi population is very small.

== Description ==
P. cummingi is typically around 30 mm (or 1.3 inches) in length. P. cummingi is blind and its eyes are unpigmented. P. cummingi has a long, serrated rostrum, which is the extension of the shell that projects forward in front of the eyes. The rostrum has six teeth on its dorsal surface. The first and second pairs of legs are almost equal in length. P. cummingi is nearly completely colorless but has some white coloring. The internal organs of the shrimp can be seen through the translucent exoskeleton.

== Life history ==
Information on the life history and reproductive cycle of P. cummingi is very limited. A female P. cummingi specimen bearing eggs was collected from Squirrel Chimney Cave in Alachua County, Florida. She was carrying approximately 30–35 embryos. Upon hatching from their bright green eggs, larvae were approximately 4.8 mm in length. Larvae are a dull yellow color. The larval development of P. cummingi involves three stages of zoea and is thought to be very similar to the larval development of glass shrimp (Palaemon paludosus). Larvae transitioned by metamorphosis into a post-larval state nine days after hatching.

== Distribution & ecology ==
=== Diet ===
P. cummingi rely on a diet of nitrogen-rich bat droppings and decaying organic matter.

=== Behavior ===
No information is currently available on the behavior of P. cummingi. The redeye chub, a predator of P. cummingi, has been spotted in the cave system connected to Squirrel Chimney.

=== Habitat ===
Researchers have only sighted P. cummingi at Squirrel Chimney Cave in Gainesville, Florida. Within the cave are "chimneys," or vertical holes that are 3–6 feet wide and reach as deep as 50 feet. P. cummingi find shelter in the water present at the bottom of these chimneys. These chimneys lead to a larger underwater cave system formed from Ocala Limestone and connected to the Crystal River Formation. This connection leads to caves with similar ecosystems, but P. cummingi have only been sighted in Squirrel Chimney. The cave environment and absence of sunlight is responsible for the shrimp's lack of color and eyesight.

=== Range ===
P. cummingi may have descended from a species found in southern Texas. However, P. cummingi is only found in northern Florida in the United States. The Squirrel Chimney Cave is the only location with recorded sightings of P. cummingi. This means that P. cummungi have very low redundancy, or that any major catastrophe could cause extinction. P. cummingi may be present across Alachua, Columbia, and Gilchrist Counties. Researchers have surveyed Cherry Pits Cave, Herzog Cave, Hog Sink and Bat Cave but found no evidence of P. cummingi at these sites.

== Conservation ==
In August 1990, the U.S. Fish and Wildlife Service listed P. cummingi as a threatened species, under the Endangered Species Act. As of 2001, P. cummingi was the only endemic stygobiont of Florida that is listed under the ESA. The Florida Fish and Wildlife Conservation Commission also currently recognizes P. cummingi as threatened. P. cummingi was most recently assessed by the International Union for Conservation of Nature in 2012, and is currently listed as critically endangered. No federal recovery plan for this species was warranted in 2008 because P. cummingi is only found in a single, privately owned location, therefore a recovery plan would not further its conservation.

=== Population size ===
Between the discovery of P. cummingi in 1953 and latest observation in 1973, there have been no more than a dozen collections. Because information on past populations of P. cummingi was never recorded, current numbers are speculated to be small but overall unknown.

=== Changes in geographical distribution ===
Geographical distribution of P. cumming is thought to be limited to a sinkhole in Malachi County, Florida. There have been no known changes to the geographical distribution of P. cumming, but there are several caves and sinks within a 5-mile radius of Squirrel Chimney that have similar ecological features. There are known passageways between the caves that could provide shelter and travel corridors for the dispersal of P. cumming.

=== U.S Fish and Wildlife Service analysis of species threats ===
The largest threats to Florida's karst systems and cave shrimp include human activity, habitat loss, ground-water contamination, aquifer withdrawals, saltwater intrusion, and competition/predation by non-native species. The status of P. cummingi as an endemic species poses the largest threat. P. cummingi is currently limited to a single sinkhole, meaning a drastic change to the sinkhole's ecosystem could increase vulnerability to extinction.

Every 5 years, the U.S. Fish and Wildlife Service releases a review which includes a 5-Factor Analysis of threats to the species. The most recent review was released in 2021.

==== Present or threatened destruction of habitat or range ====
P. cummingi's ESA listing rule noted that potential residential development and changes in land use were primary threats. The shrimp is known from only one small sinkhole that leads to a flooded cave system, meaning any changes to the sinkhole or the underlying aquifer have the potential to adversely affect or cause extinction to the species. Aquifers such as the one connected to Squirrel Chimney are particularly vulnerable to surface pollution.

==== Overutilization ====
P. cummingi's listing rule states that this species is known from one site that could be seriously damaged by acts of vandalism. Even though the population size of the shrimp is unknown, it is likely very small and vulnerable to impacts from scientific or other collecting.

==== Disease or predation ====
There is one particular invasive species thought to have come to Squirrel Chimney via cave passageways: the redeye chub (Notropis harperi), which feeds on cave shrimp and is a direct threat to the survival of P. cummingi.

==== Inadequacy of existing regulatory mechanisms ====
The ESA listing rule noted that no existing regulatory mechanisms apply to P. cummingi. There is no information on the sensitivity of P. cummingi to common pollutants, so federal water quality laws may or may not be protective.

==== Other natural or manmade factors affecting its continued existence ====
Natural droughts, as well as water withdrawals for human use, can impact cave water levels. Predicted increases in drought frequency, intensity, and duration could pose a threat to P. cummingi.

=== Species Status Assessment ===
The current status of P. cummingi remains unknown as of 2021. The U.S. Fish and Wildlife Service recommends that P. cummingi remains classified as threatened until another survey can be conducted. The most recent status surveys were conducted between 1994 and 1996, which found no individuals in the Squirrel Chimney Cave or four other sampling locations, and the water level in Squirrel Chimney Cave was observed to be 2.5 metres (8.2 ft) less than measurements made in the 1940s.
