= Apalachee shiner =

Conservation status
- Least Concern (IUCN 3.1)

Scientific classification
- Kingdom: Animalia
- Phylum: Chordata
- Class: Actinopterygii
- Order: Cypriniformes
- Family: Leuciscidae
- Subfamily: Pogonichthyinae
- Genus: Pteronotropis
- Species: P. grandipinnis

Binomial name
- Pteronotropis grandipinnis (D. S. Jordan, 1877)

Synonyms
- Photogenis grandipinnis D. S. Jordan, 1877; Notropis grandipinnis (D. S. Jordan 1877)

Species of fish

The Apalachee shiner (Pteronotropis grandipinnis) is a species of freshwater ray-finned fish belonging to the family Leuciscidae, the shiners, daces and minnows. This species is endemic to the southeastern United States. It is found in the Apalachicola River drainage in Georgia, Alabama, and Florida.

== Description ==
The fish has a very similar appearance to the sailfin shiner. It has between 33 and 42 scales along the lateral line. The fish can reach a total length of 6.5 cm (2.5 in).

A blueish-black stripe along the side extends to a black oval found at the base of the caudal fin.

The fish has a larger dorsal fin and has between 9 and 11 anal rays. A breeding male does not possess a light edge along the black dorsal fin when compared to the sailfin shiner, but has a chevron-shaped black blotch at the base of the caudal fin. A yellow edge can be found on the anal fin of breeding males.

== Distribution and habitat ==
The fish is found in the Apalachicola River drainage. The fish is absent from the Chattahoochee River system north of Cedar Creek in Houston County, Alabama.

The fish is common among sand-bottomed and silt-bottomed creeks and small rivers. It is often found among debris and undercut banks.

== Conservation status ==
The fish has been found to have moderate conservation concern in Alabama.
