= Willis Merriwether =

Black Alabama legislator in 1874

Willis Merriwether was a state legislator in Alabama in 1874. He represented Wilcox County, Alabama and lived in Prairie Bluff, Alabama.

A newspaper described him as the "noisiest negro in the House" and as "impudent as well as ignorant."

In 1875, the Journal of the House of Representatives of the State of Alabama noted his death.

He and other black members of the Alabama legislature during the Reconstruction era are commemorated on a historical marker.

== See also ==
- African American officeholders from the end of the Civil War until before 1900
