= Dale Masonic Lodge =

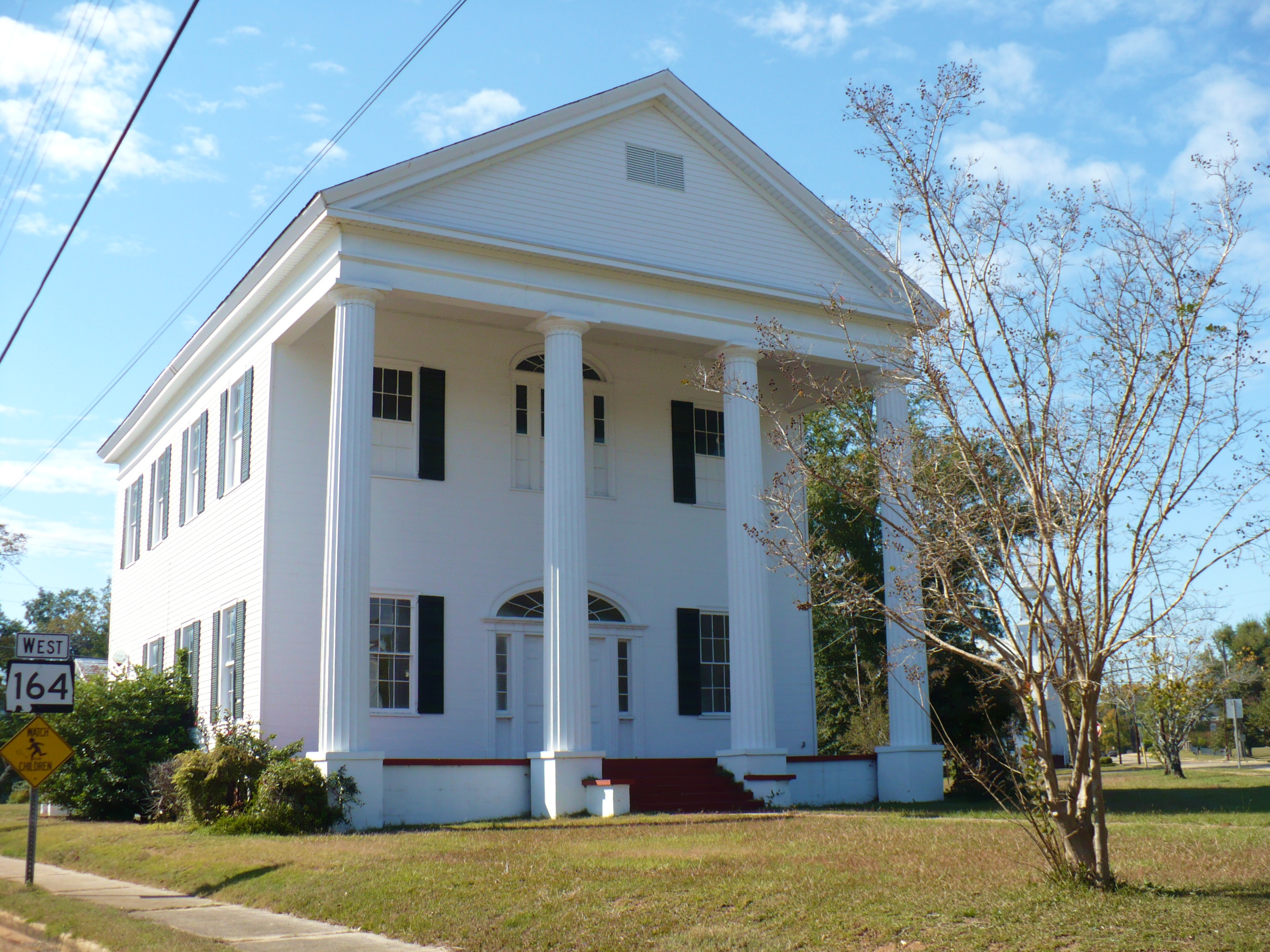
- Building in 2008

- Location within Alabama
- 31.993429°N 87.291374°W
- Location: Camden, Alabama

History
- Built: c.1848

The Dale Masonic Lodge, at the intersection of Broad St. and Clifton St. in Camden, Alabama, was built around 1848.

The lodge group was organized in 1827 in Dale Town, which later became Prairie Bluff, Alabama, and the group voted to move to Camden in the 1840s.

In 1865, Union troops camped in the building.

It was photographed by E.W. Russell and documented in the Historic American Buildings Survey in 1936, and was photographed by Frances Benjamin Johnston in the Carnegie Survey of the Architecture of the South (CSAS) in 1939.
