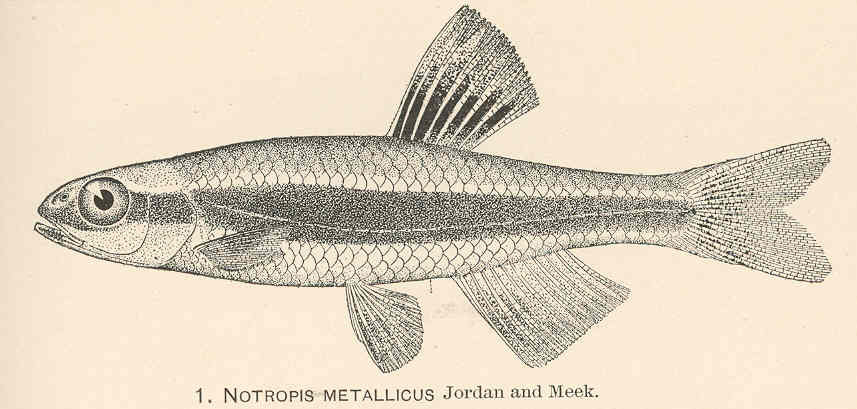

Conservation status
- Least Concern (IUCN 3.1)

Scientific classification
- Kingdom: Animalia
- Phylum: Chordata
- Class: Actinopterygii
- Order: Cypriniformes
- Family: Leuciscidae
- Subfamily: Pogonichthyinae
- Genus: Pteronotropis
- Species: P. metallicus

Binomial name
- Pteronotropis metallicus (D. S. Jordan & Meek, 1884)

Synonyms
- Notropis metallicus Jordan & Meek, 1884

= Metallic shiner =

Species of fish

The metallic shiner (Pteronotropis metallicus) is a species of freshwater ray-finned fish belonging to the family Leuciscidae, the shiners, daces and minnows. This species is found in the southeastern United States.
