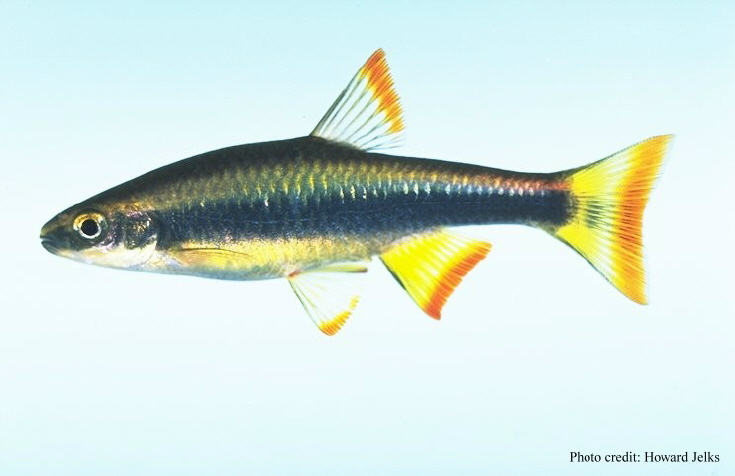

Conservation status
- Least Concern (IUCN 3.1)

Scientific classification
- Kingdom: Animalia
- Phylum: Chordata
- Class: Actinopterygii
- Order: Cypriniformes
- Family: Leuciscidae
- Subfamily: Pogonichthyinae
- Genus: Pteronotropis
- Species: P. signipinnis

Binomial name
- Pteronotropis signipinnis (R. M. Bailey & Suttkus, 1952)

Synonyms
- Notropis signipinnis Bailey & Suttkus, 1952

= Flagfin shiner =

Species of fish

The flagfin shiner (Pteronotropis signipinnis) is a species of freshwater ray-finned fish belonging to the family Leuciscidae, the shiners, daces and minnows. This species is found in North America.

== Distribution ==
This freshwater species is benthopelagic and usually occurs over sand near vegetation, in creeks, small rivers, and flowing pools and runs of headwaters. They are found in the United States in the Apalachicola River in Florida, Pearl River in Mississippi, and parts of Louisiana. They are also found in Alabama, but occur rarely.

== Description ==
It is small and colourful, growing to between 40 and 55 mm (1.6 and 2.2 in). The body tapers to a narrow caudal peduncle. Much of the sides are covered by a lateral band dark in colour. The caudal, dorsal and anal fins are yellow or red-orange with black marginal rays. Present on the caudal fin base are two bright sulfur-yellow spots, with the region between the spots being substantially darker. The flagfin shiner exists syntopically with the sailfin shiner, P. hypselopterus, and the two can be difficult to differentiate. It can be distinguished by its red fins, yellow tail spots, and smaller nuptial tubercles.

== Etymology ==
"Pteronotropis" means "winged keeled back", which refers to the breeding males' enlarged dorsal fin. "Signipinnis" means "banner fin", referring to the striking color of the median fins.
