= Phantom shiner =

Conservation status
- Extinct (IUCN 3.1)

Scientific classification
- Kingdom: Animalia
- Phylum: Chordata
- Class: Actinopterygii
- Order: Cypriniformes
- Family: Leuciscidae
- Subfamily: Pogonichthyinae
- Genus: Alburnops
- Species: †A. orca

Binomial name
- †Alburnops orca (Woolman, 1894)

Synonyms
- Notropis orca Woolman, 1894

Extinct species of fish

The phantom shiner (Alburnops orca) is an extinct species of fish. It was once endemic to the Rio Grande basin and ranged from central New Mexico to southernmost Texas and adjacent Tamaulipas. It was once found in the warm water reaches of the Rio Grande, though never particularly abundant. The species was last collected on 28 July 1975, in Tamaulipas, Mexico, 4.0 km below Ciudad Diaz Ordaz. Subsequent attempts to collect the phantom shiner from 1977 to 1994 were unsuccessful and it has been presumed extinct as of 1996.

The native range of the phantom shiner was the Rio Grande from Espanola downstream to Brownsville, Texas. In New Mexico, it was documented only in the reach from Espanola to Socorro.

Specimens of the phantom shiner have been collected only irregularly (three times in 1939) in a 60 km reach of the middle Rio Grande between Isleta and Bernardo. A single specimen was taken from the Rio Grande in Big Bend National Park in 1953 representing the only known example of the species in the river between El Paso and the mouth of the Pecos River. In 1959 Trevino-Robinson reported the phantom shiner as abundant in the lower Rio Grande in Texas, downstream from the Pecos River confluence. The last known specimen was recorded in Mexico in 1975.
