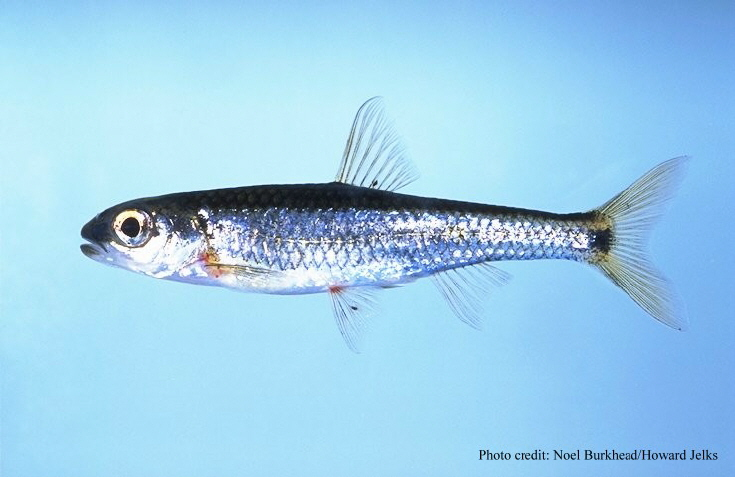

Conservation status
- Least Concern (IUCN 3.1)

Scientific classification
- Kingdom: Animalia
- Phylum: Chordata
- Class: Actinopterygii
- Order: Cypriniformes
- Family: Leuciscidae
- Subfamily: Pogonichthyinae
- Genus: Alburnops
- Species: A. xaenocephalus

Binomial name
- Alburnops xaenocephalus (Jordan, 1877)

Synonyms
- Hybopsis xaenocephalus Jordan, 1877; Notropis xaenocephalus (Jordan 1877)

= Coosa shiner =

Species of fish

Coosa shiner (Alburnops xaenocephalus) is a species of freshwater ray-finned fish in the family Leuciscidae, the shiners, daces and minnows. It is endemic to the United States where it inhabits the Coosa and Tallapoosa river systems in the Mobile Bay drainage above the Fall Line in southeastern Tennessee, northwestern Georgia, and eastern Alabama.
