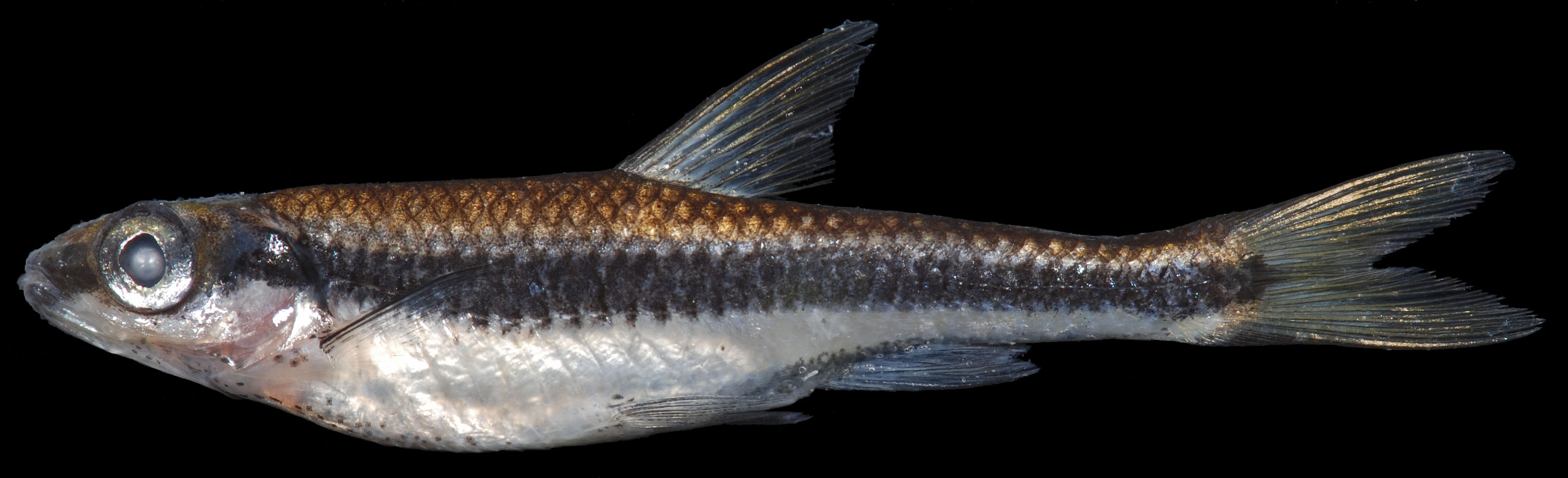

Conservation status
- Least Concern (IUCN 3.1)

Scientific classification
- Kingdom: Animalia
- Phylum: Chordata
- Class: Actinopterygii
- Order: Cypriniformes
- Family: Leuciscidae
- Subfamily: Pogonichthyinae
- Genus: Pteronotropis
- Species: P. cummingsae

Binomial name
- Pteronotropis cummingsae (G. S. Myers, 1925)

Synonyms
- Notropis cummingsae Myers, 1925; Notropis cummingsae collis C. L. Hubbs & Raney, 1951

= Dusky shiner =

Species of fish

The dusky shiner (Pteronotropis cummingsae) is a species of freshwater ray-finned fish belonging to the family Leuciscidae, the shiners, daces and minnows. It is endemic to the United States, where it is found in the lower Tar River drainage, North Carolina, south to Altamaha River drainage in Georgia, the St. Johns River drainage in Florida, and the Aucilla River drainage to Choctawhatchee River drainage, Florida, Georgia, and Alabama.
