= Gulf logperch =

Conservation status
- Least Concern (IUCN 3.1)

Scientific classification
- Kingdom: Animalia
- Phylum: Chordata
- Class: Actinopterygii
- Order: Perciformes
- Family: Percidae
- Genus: Percina
- Species: P. suttkusi

Binomial name
- Percina suttkusi B. A. Thompson, 1997

Species of fish

The Gulf logperch (Percina suttkusi) is a small species of freshwater ray-finned fish, a darter from the subfamily Etheostomatinae, part of the family Percidae, which also contains the perches, ruffes and pikeperches. It is found in North America where it occurs in the coastal river systems Of the Gulf of Mexico from Lake Pontchartrain drainages east through the Pearl and Pascagoula drainages to the Mobile basin. It prefers gravel runs and riffles of small to medium-sized rivers. This species was first formally described in 1992 by Bruce A. Thompson (1946–2007) with the type locality given as the Pearl River at river mile 46.8, below pools at Bluff Sill, about 6 kilometers south of Bogalusa, Louisiana, near Louisiana Highway 21 in Pearl River County, Mississippi.

== Etymology ==
The specific name honors the American ichthyologist Royal D. Suttkus (1920– 2009).
