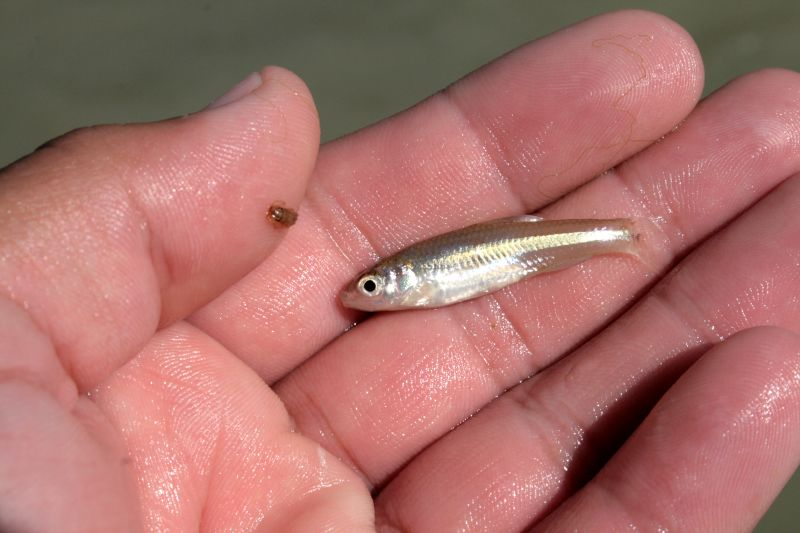

Conservation status
- Least Concern (IUCN 3.1)

- Apparently Secure (NatureServe)

Scientific classification
- Kingdom: Animalia
- Phylum: Chordata
- Class: Actinopterygii
- Order: Cypriniformes
- Family: Leuciscidae
- Subfamily: Pogonichthyinae
- Genus: Alburnops
- Species: A. braytoni

Binomial name
- Alburnops braytoni (D. S. Jordan & Evermann, 1896)

Synonyms
- Moniana nitida Girard, 1856; Notropis braytoni D. S. Jordan & Evermann, 1896; Notropis robustus Meek, 1905

= Tamaulipas shiner =

Species of fish

The Tamaulipas shiner (Alburnops braytoni) is a species of freshwater ray-finned fish in the family Leuciscidae, the shiners, daces and minnows. This species occurs in the Rio Grande drainage in Texas and northern Mexico.
