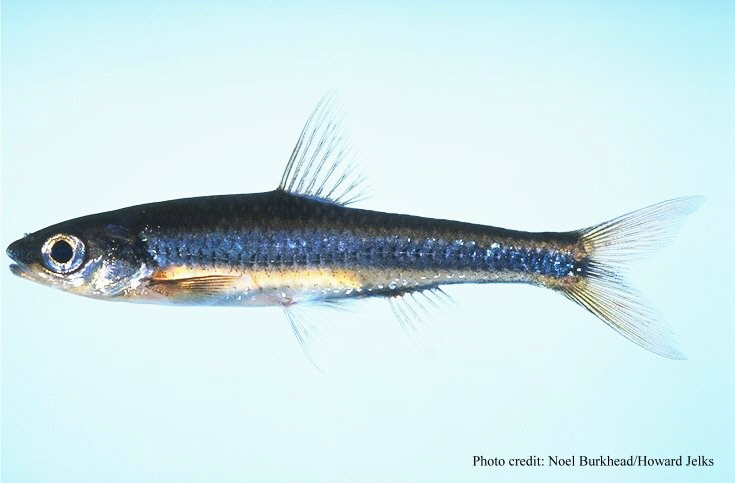

Conservation status
- Least Concern (IUCN 3.1)

Scientific classification
- Kingdom: Animalia
- Phylum: Chordata
- Class: Actinopterygii
- Order: Cypriniformes
- Family: Leuciscidae
- Subfamily: Pogonichthyinae
- Genus: Alburnops
- Species: A. petersoni

Binomial name
- Alburnops petersoni (Fowler, 1942)

Synonyms
- Notropis petersoni Fowler, 1942

= Coastal shiner =

Species of fish

The coastal shiner (Alburnops petersoni) is a species of freshwater ray-finned fish in the family Leuciscidae, the shiners, daces and minnows. It is endemic to the United States where it is found in Atlantic and Gulf slope drainages from the Cape Fear and Waccamaw river drainages, North Carolina, south to southern Florida, and west to Jordan River in Mississippi.
