= Lowland shiner =

Conservation status
- Least Concern (IUCN 3.1)

Scientific classification
- Kingdom: Animalia
- Phylum: Chordata
- Class: Actinopterygii
- Order: Cypriniformes
- Family: Leuciscidae
- Subfamily: Pogonichthyinae
- Genus: Pteronotropis
- Species: P. stonei

Binomial name
- Pteronotropis stonei (Fowler, 1921)

Synonyms
- Notropis stonei Fowler, 1921

Species of fish

The lowland shiner (Pteronotropis stonei) is a species of freshwater ray-finned fish belonging to the family Leuciscidae, the shiners, daces and minnows. This species is endemic to the southeastern United States. It is found in the Peedee River drainage in South Carolina to Satilla River drainage in Georgia.
