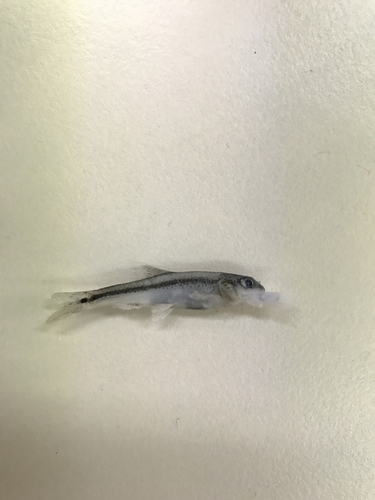

Conservation status
- Vulnerable (IUCN 3.1)

Scientific classification
- Kingdom: Animalia
- Phylum: Chordata
- Class: Actinopterygii
- Order: Cypriniformes
- Family: Leuciscidae
- Subfamily: Pogonichthyinae
- Genus: Alburnops
- Species: A. aguirrepequenoi

Binomial name
- Alburnops aguirrepequenoi (Contreras-Balderas & Rivera-Tiellery, 1973)

Synonyms
- Notropis aguirrepequenoi Contreras-Balderas & Rivera-Tiellery, 1973

= Soto la Marina shiner =

Species of fish

The Soto la Marina shiner (Alburnops aguirrepequenoi) is a species of freshwater ray-finned fish in the family Leuciscidae, the shiners, daces and minnows. It is endemic to Mexico, where it occurs in the lower Rio Grande.
