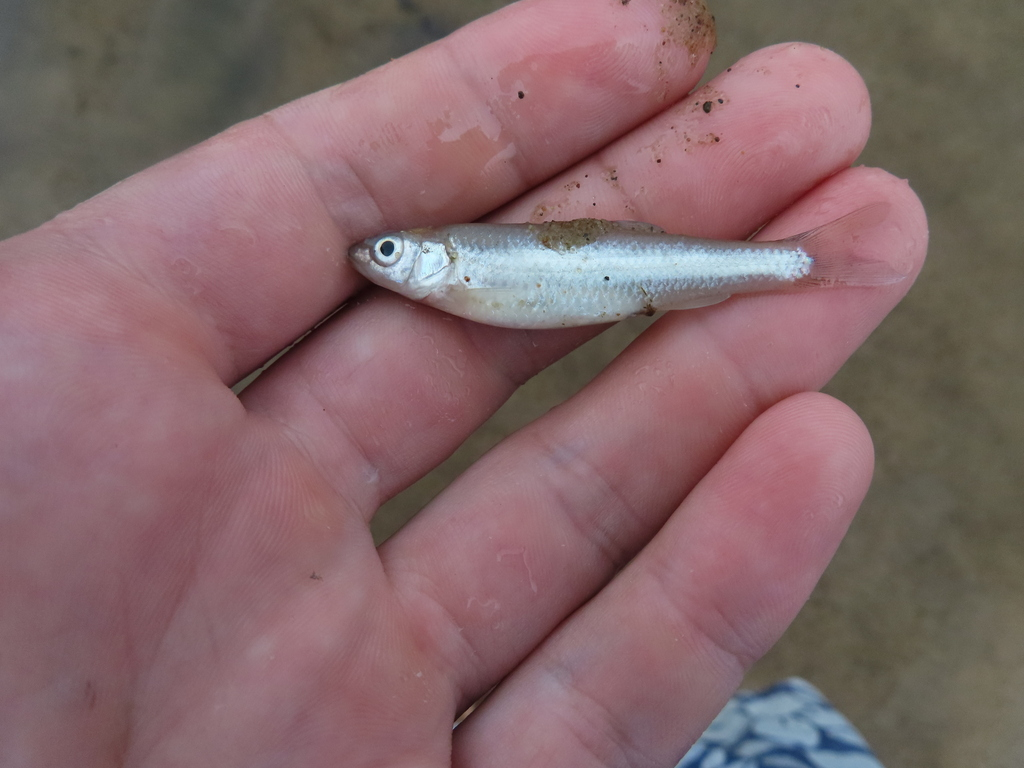

Conservation status
- Least Concern (IUCN 3.1)

- Secure (NatureServe)

Scientific classification
- Kingdom: Animalia
- Phylum: Chordata
- Class: Actinopterygii
- Order: Cypriniformes
- Family: Leuciscidae
- Subfamily: Pogonichthyinae
- Genus: Alburnops
- Species: A. blennius

Binomial name
- Alburnops blennius Girard, 1856

Synonyms
- Notropis blennius (Girard, 1856); Episema jejuna Forbes, 1878; Notropis albeolus C. H. Eigenmann & R. S. Eigenmann, 1893; Notropis jordani C. H. Eigenmann & R. S. Eigenmann, 1893

= River shiner =

Species of fish

The river shiner (Alburnops blennius) is a species of freshwater ray-finned fish in the family Leuciscidae, the shiners, daces and minnows. It is found in the United States and Canada, where it inhabits the Hudson Bay basin from Alberta to Manitoba, south through the Red Red River in Minnesota and North Dakota; and the Mississippi River basin from Wisconsin and Minnesota to Texas, Louisiana, and Mississippi, west to eastern Colorado, and east to West Virginia.
