= William "Bill" Dannelly Reservoir =

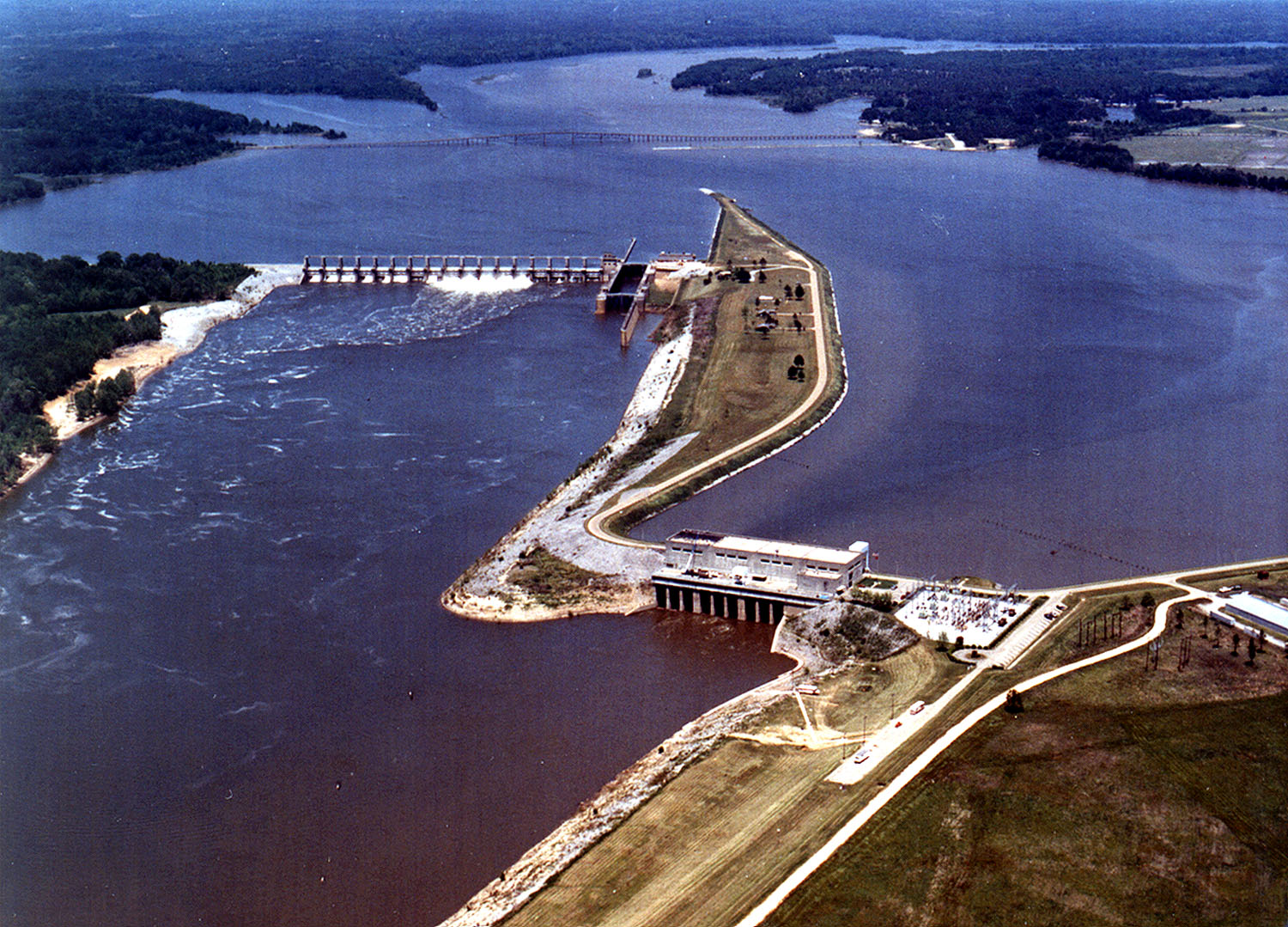
- Aerial view of Millers Ferry Lock and Dam and the William "Bill" Dannelly Reservoir

- Location within Alabama Location within the United States
- Location: Dallas / Wilcox counties, Alabama
- Coordinates: 32.11967°N 87.3983°W
- Type: Reservoir
- Primary inflows: Alabama River, Cahaba River
- Primary outflows: Alabama River
- Basin countries: United States

The William "Bill" Dannelly Reservoir is a reservoir created by Millers Ferry Lock and Dam on the Alabama River in Dallas County and Wilcox County in Alabama. It covers 27 square miles (70 km^{2}) and has approximately 500 miles (800 km) of shoreline. It was named for William "Bill" Dannelly, a former Wilcox County probate judge credited with leading the modernization of the Alabama and Coosa Rivers.

The Dannelly Reservoir is notable as a regional fishing ground and recreational area. Fish species present include white crappie, striped bass, hybrid striped bass, blue catfish, and channel catfish. Several parks border the lake. Those with developed camping include Roland Cooper State Park, Chilatchee Creek Campground, and Millers Ferry Campground. Primitive camping only is available at Six Mile Creek Park, Elm Bluff Park, Portland Landing, and Bridgeport Landing. Prairie Bluff and the Liddell Archeological Site are two historic sites adjacent to the lake.

== See also ==
- List of Alabama dams and reservoirs
- List of lakes in Alabama
