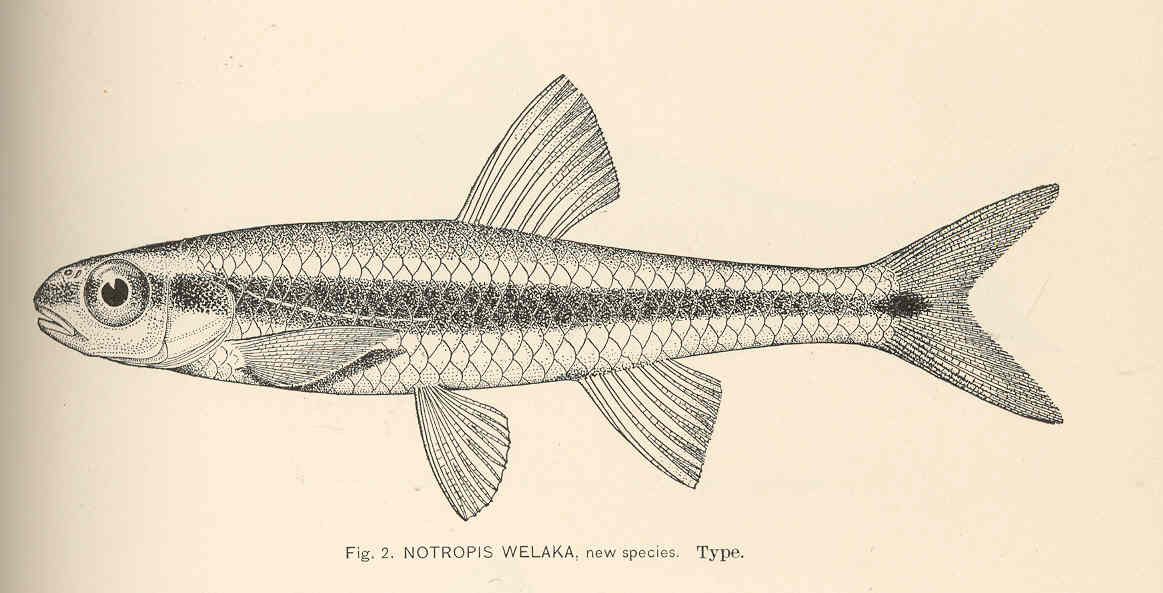

Conservation status
- Vulnerable (IUCN 3.1)

Scientific classification
- Kingdom: Animalia
- Phylum: Chordata
- Class: Actinopterygii
- Order: Cypriniformes
- Family: Leuciscidae
- Subfamily: Pogonichthyinae
- Genus: Pteronotropis
- Species: P. welaka

Binomial name
- Pteronotropis welaka (Evermann & Kendall, 1898)

Synonyms
- Notropis welaka Evermann & Kendall, 1898

= Bluenose shiner =

Species of fish

The bluenose shiner (Pteronotropis welaka) is a species of freshwater ray-finned fish belonging to the family Leuciscidae, the shiners, daces and minnows. It is found only in the United States, mostly in Florida and parts of Alabama and Georgia; its habitat is deep, slow-moving coastal creeks and small to medium rivers. It prefers deep pools than shallow areas.

It is found in Pearl River, Apalachicola River and St. Johns River, but it is apparently not found in the Escatawpa River or Perdido River. It is known to have a fragmented population, and so has a spotty distribution in the Chipola River, Choctawhatchee River, Yellow River, Conecuh River, Alabama River and Tombigbee River. The population is very poorly known, with it being rare in the western panhandle of Florida, declining from the past 10 years in Mississippi and "ever decreasing" in Alabama.

In 2013, its conservation status was changed from Data Deficient to Vulnerable. It is threatened by streamside vegetation removal for agricultural and urban development and overcollection for the aquarium trade.
