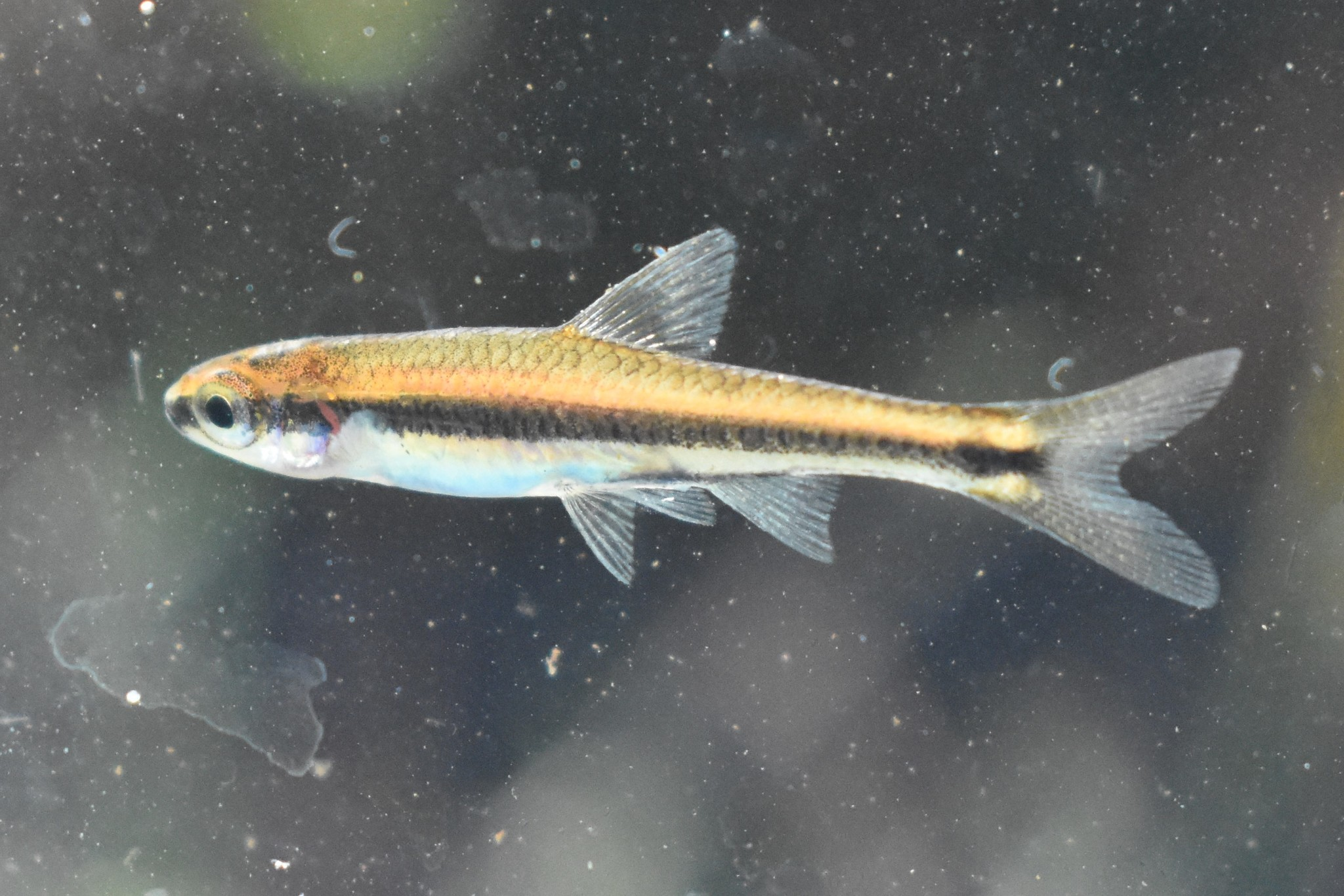

Conservation status
- Least Concern (IUCN 3.1)

Scientific classification
- Kingdom: Animalia
- Phylum: Chordata
- Class: Actinopterygii
- Order: Cypriniformes
- Family: Leuciscidae
- Subfamily: Pogonichthyinae
- Genus: Pteronotropis
- Species: P. harperi

Binomial name
- Pteronotropis harperi (Fowler, 1941)

Synonyms
- Notropis harperi Fowler, 1941; Hybopsis harperi (Fowler, 1941); Notropis norrisi Fowler, 1945; Hybopsis harperi subterranea C. L. Hubbs & Crowe, 1956

= Redeye chub =

Species of fish

Redeye chub (Pteronotropis harperi) is a species of freshwater ray-finned fish belonging to the family Leuciscidae, the shiners, daces and minnows. This species is native to freshwaters of southeastern North America.

Unlike other members of Notropis, they have a pair of barbels on the corners of their mouths.

== Etymology ==
The specific name is in honor of Dr. Francis Harper, who in 1939-40 collected the type specimens during field investigations along the routes of John and William Bartram.
