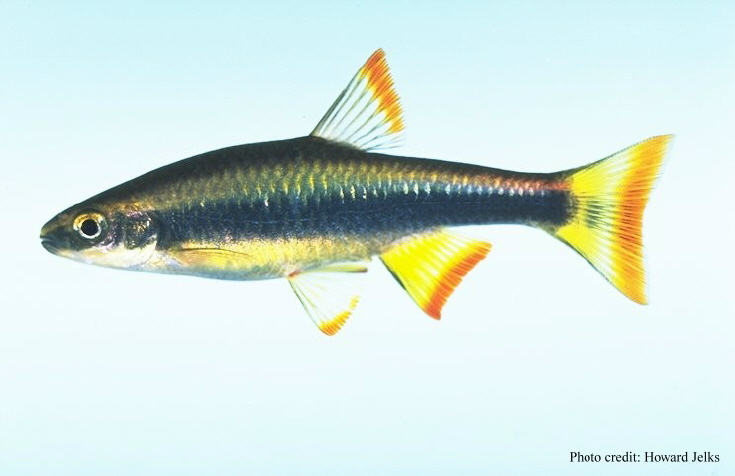
- Flagfin shiner (Pteronotropis signipinnis)

Scientific classification
- Kingdom: Animalia
- Phylum: Chordata
- Class: Actinopterygii
- Order: Cypriniformes
- Family: Leuciscidae
- Subfamily: Pogonichthyinae
- Genus: Pteronotropis; Fowler, 1935

Type species
- Alburnus formosus Putnam, 1863

= Pteronotropis =

Genus of fishes

Pteronotropis is a genus of freshwater ray-finned fish belonging to the family Leuciscidae, the shiners, daces and minnows. These fishes are endemic to the United States.

== Characteristics ==
The genus is characterized by a broad dark blue stripe along the side. The genus has large anal and dorsal fins, as well as a compressed body.

== Species ==
These are the currently recognized species in this genus:

- Pteronotropis cummingsae (Myers, 1925) (Dusky shiner)
- Pteronotropis euryzonus (Suttkus, 1955) (Broadstripe shiner)
- Pteronotropis grandipinnis (D. S. Jordan, 1877) (Apalachee shiner)
- Pteronotropis harperi (Fowler, 1941) (Redeye chub)
- Pteronotropis hubbsi (R. M. Bailey & H. W. Robison, 1978) (Bluehead shiner)
- Pteronotropis hypselopterus (Günther, 1868) (Sailfin shiner)
- Pteronotropis merlini (Suttkus & Mettee, 2001) (Orangetail shiner)
- Pteronotropis metallicus (D. S. Jordan & Meek, 1884) (Metallic shiner)
- Pteronotropis signipinnis (R. M. Bailey & Suttkus, 1952) (Flagfin shiner)
- Pteronotropis stonei (Fowler, 1921) (Lowland shiner)
- Pteronotropis welaka (Evermann & Kendall, 1898) (Bluenose shiner)
