= Millers Ferry Lock and Dam =

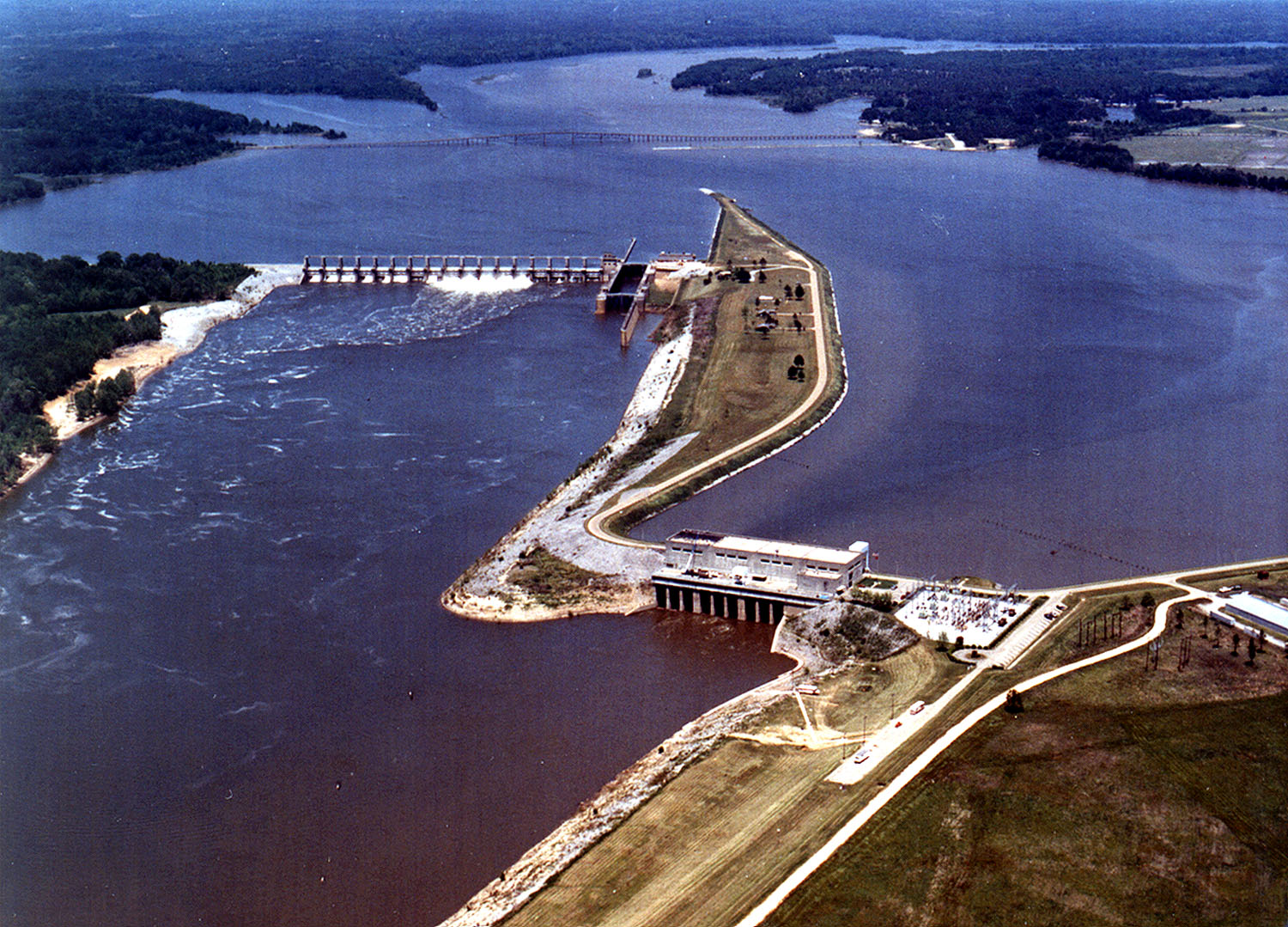
- Aerial view of Millers Ferry Lock and Dam from the south.
- Location: Wilcox County, Alabama
- Coordinates: 32°6′3.05″N 87°23′59.98″W
- Construction began: 1963
- Opening date: 1974
- Operator(s): USACE

Dam and spillways
- Impounds: Alabama River

Reservoir
- Creates: William "Bill" Dannelly Reservoir
- Surface area: 27 sq mi (70 km^{2})

Millers Ferry Lock and Dam is a lock and hydroelectric dam on the Alabama River, near the community of Millers Ferry, Alabama. It was built by and continues to be operated by the United States Army Corps of Engineers. Construction of the complex began in 1963 and was completed in 1974. The Millers Ferry Powerhouse came on line in 1970 and has a generating capacity of 90 megawatts. Following a history of machinery problems and failures, major repair work on the power station was authorized in 1996.

Millers Ferry Lock and Dam impounds the William "Bill" Dannelly Reservoir. The reservoir covers 27 square miles (70 km^{2}) and has approximately 500 miles (800 km) of shoreline.

Beginning in the spring of 2009, the Corps of Engineers began opening the dam's locks for a few hours each day in order to restore access to inland waters for migratory marine fish. Fish sampling in the lock is being conducted in order to determine which species are making use of the opening in order to refine the timing.

== See also ==
- List of Alabama dams and reservoirs
