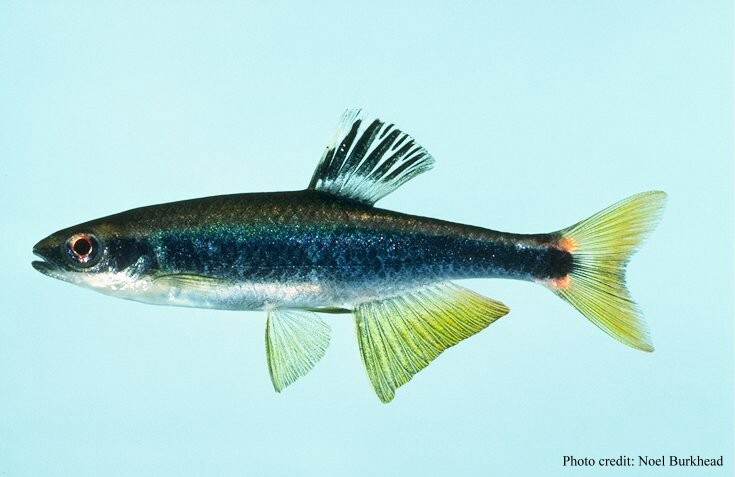

Conservation status
- Least Concern (IUCN 3.1)

Scientific classification
- Kingdom: Animalia
- Phylum: Chordata
- Class: Actinopterygii
- Order: Cypriniformes
- Family: Leuciscidae
- Subfamily: Pogonichthyinae
- Genus: Pteronotropis
- Species: P. hypselopterus

Binomial name
- Pteronotropis hypselopterus (Günther, 1868)

Synonyms
- Leuciscus hypselopterus Günther, 1868; Alburnus formosus Putnam, 1863

= Sailfin shiner =

Species of fish

The sailfin shiner (Pteronotropis hypselopterus) is a species of freshwater ray-finned fish belonging to the family Leuciscidae, the shiners, daces and minnows. This species is endemic to the southeastern United States.

== Description ==
The sailfin shiner has a deep and compressed body, with a narrow base for the caudal fin. Its lateral line is curved downward. It has a maximum total length of 7 cm (2.75 in).

The fish is pink-brown or olive on the top half, and white or light pink on the bottom half. It has a dark brown stripe that extends from the head to the dorsal fin, and has a steel-blue stripe along the side that has a thin pink to red line bordering above.

The base of the caudal fin has a small red spot on the top and bottom of the side, while a black spot is on the center of the side of the base of the caudal fin. The dorsal fin has a dusky central band, and other fins are a yellow to light orange. The dorsal and anal fins are almost triangular, resembling sails, from which their common name is derived. Breeding males have light orange edges on their dorsal fins.

== Distribution and habitat ==
The fish can be found in Gulf Coast drainages from Alabama to Florida, including in the Mobile Basin.

The fish inhabit sand-bottomed and clay-bottomed pools or run waters of creeks and small rivers. They can often be found around debris or vegetation.

== Life history ==
As the fish begins its life as an embryo, its cement glands begin to develop. As a non-feeding larva, glue is secreted from the cement glands, and the posterior swim bladder forms. The gills, mouth, and gut lining form. The yolk sac becomes streamlined. When swim-up begins, glue secretion stops. The posterior swim bladder becomes inflated. During this stage, the fish is suspended in the water column, and the yolk is almost depleted. The anterior swim bladder forms. After initial feeding, median and pelvic fins develop, and the anterior swim bladder inflates.
