= Alabama River =

River in Alabama, United States

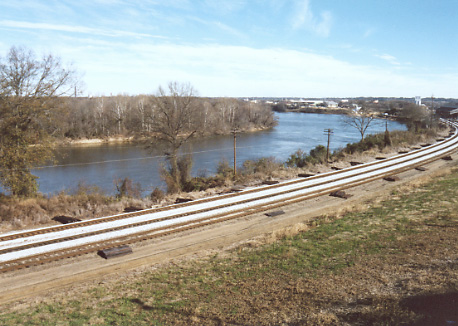
- The Alabama River at Montgomery in 2004

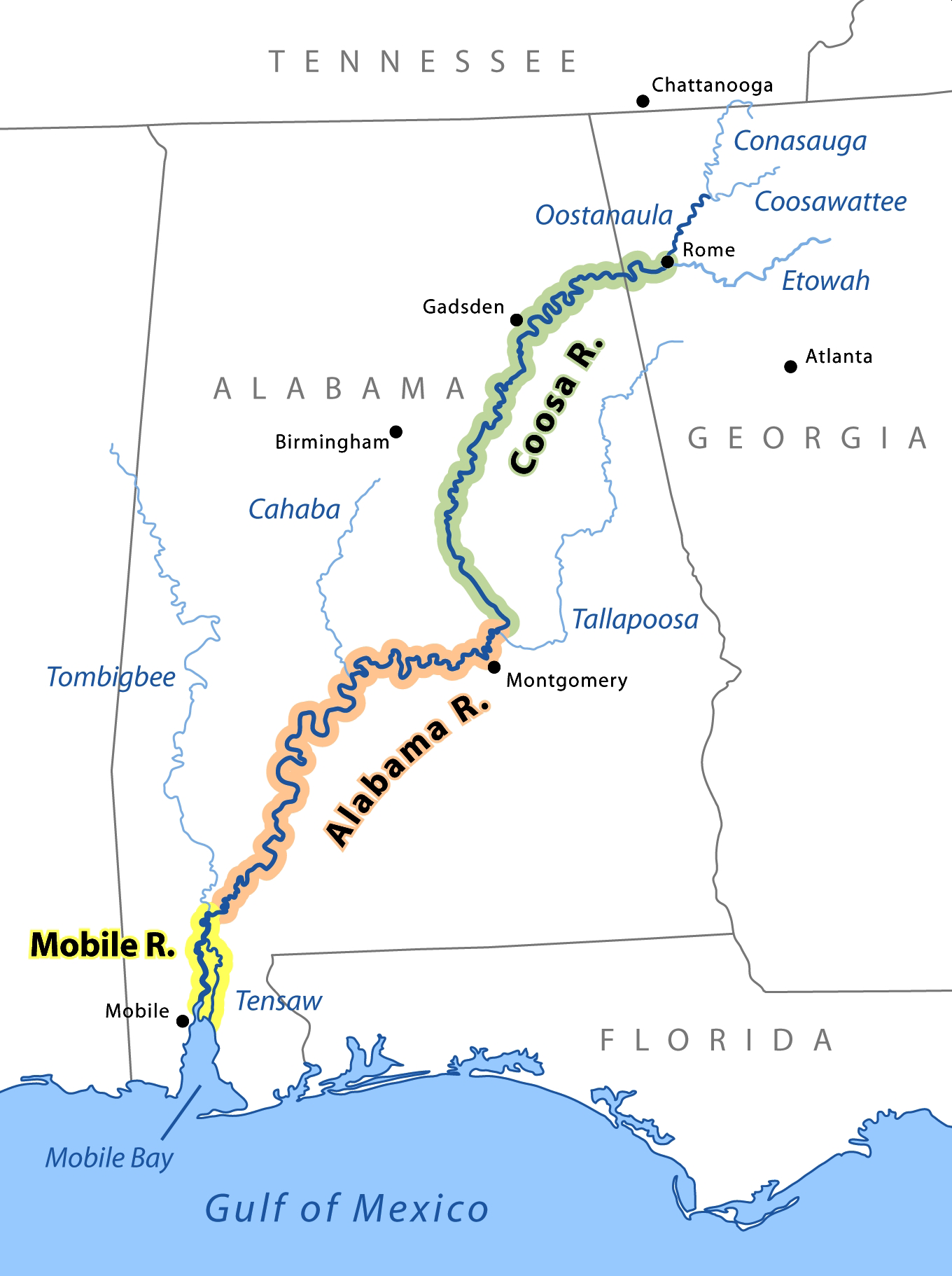
- The Mobile, Alabama, and Coosa rivers are essentially a single river the name of which changes at the confluences of major tributaries.

Location
- Country: United States

Physical characteristics
- Source: Tallapoosa and Coosa Rivers
  - location: Wetumpka, Alabama
  - coordinates: 32°29′10″N 86°16′43″W
  - elevation: 42 m (138 ft)
- Mouth: Mobile River
  - location: Mount Vernon, Alabama
  - coordinates: 31°08′18″N 87°56′24″W
  - elevation: 6 m (20 ft)
- Length: 318 miles (512 km)
- Basin size: 59,000 km^{2} (23,000 mi^{2})

Basin features
- Progression: Mobile → Gulf of Mexico

The Alabama River, in the U.S. state of Alabama, is formed by the Tallapoosa and Coosa rivers, which unite about 6 miles (10 km) north of Montgomery, near the town of Wetumpka.

Over a course of approximately 319 miles (513 km), the river meanders west towards Selma, then southwest until, about 45 miles (72 km) from Mobile, it unites with the Tombigbee, forming the Mobile and Tensaw rivers, which discharge via the Mobile–Tensaw Delta into Mobile Bay.

== Description ==
The run of the Alabama is highly meandering. Its width varies from 50 to 200 yards (46 to 183 m), and its depth from 3 to 40 feet (1 to 12 m). Its length as measured by the United States Geological Survey is 318.5 miles (512.6 km), and by steamboat measurement, 420 miles (680 km).

The river crosses the richest agricultural and timber districts of the state. Railways connect it with the mineral regions of north-central Alabama.

After the Coosa and Tallapoosa rivers, the principal tributary of the Alabama is the Cahaba River, which is about 194 miles (312 km) long and joins the Alabama River about 10 miles (16 km) below Selma. The Alabama River's main tributary, the Coosa River, crosses the mineral region of Alabama and is navigable for light-draft boats from Rome, Georgia, to about 117 miles (188 km) above Wetumpka (about 102 miles (164 km) below Rome and 26 miles (42 km) below Greensport), and from Wetumpka to its junction with the Tallapoosa. The channel of the river has been considerably altered by the federal government.

The navigation of the Tallapoosa River – which has its source in Paulding County, Georgia, and is about 265 miles (426 km) long – is prevented by shoals and a 60-foot (18 m) fall at Tallassee, a few miles north of its junction with the Coosa. The Alabama is navigable throughout the year.

The river played an important role in the growth of the economy in the region during the 19th century as a source of transportation of goods, which included slaves. The river is still used for transportation of farming produce; however, it is not as important as it once was due to the construction of roads and railways.

Documented by Europeans first in 1701, the Alabama, Coosa, and Tallapoosa rivers were central to the homeland of the Creek Indians before their removal by United States forces to the Indian Territory in the 1830s.

== Lock and dams ==
The Alabama River has three lock and dams between Montgomery and the Mobile River. The Robert F. Henry Lock & Dam is located at river mile 236.2, the Millers Ferry Lock & Dam is located at river mile 133.0, and the Claiborne Lock & Dam is located at river mile 72.5. These dams create R.E. "Bob" Woodruff Lake, William Dannely Reservoir, and Claiborne Lake respectively.

== Gallery ==
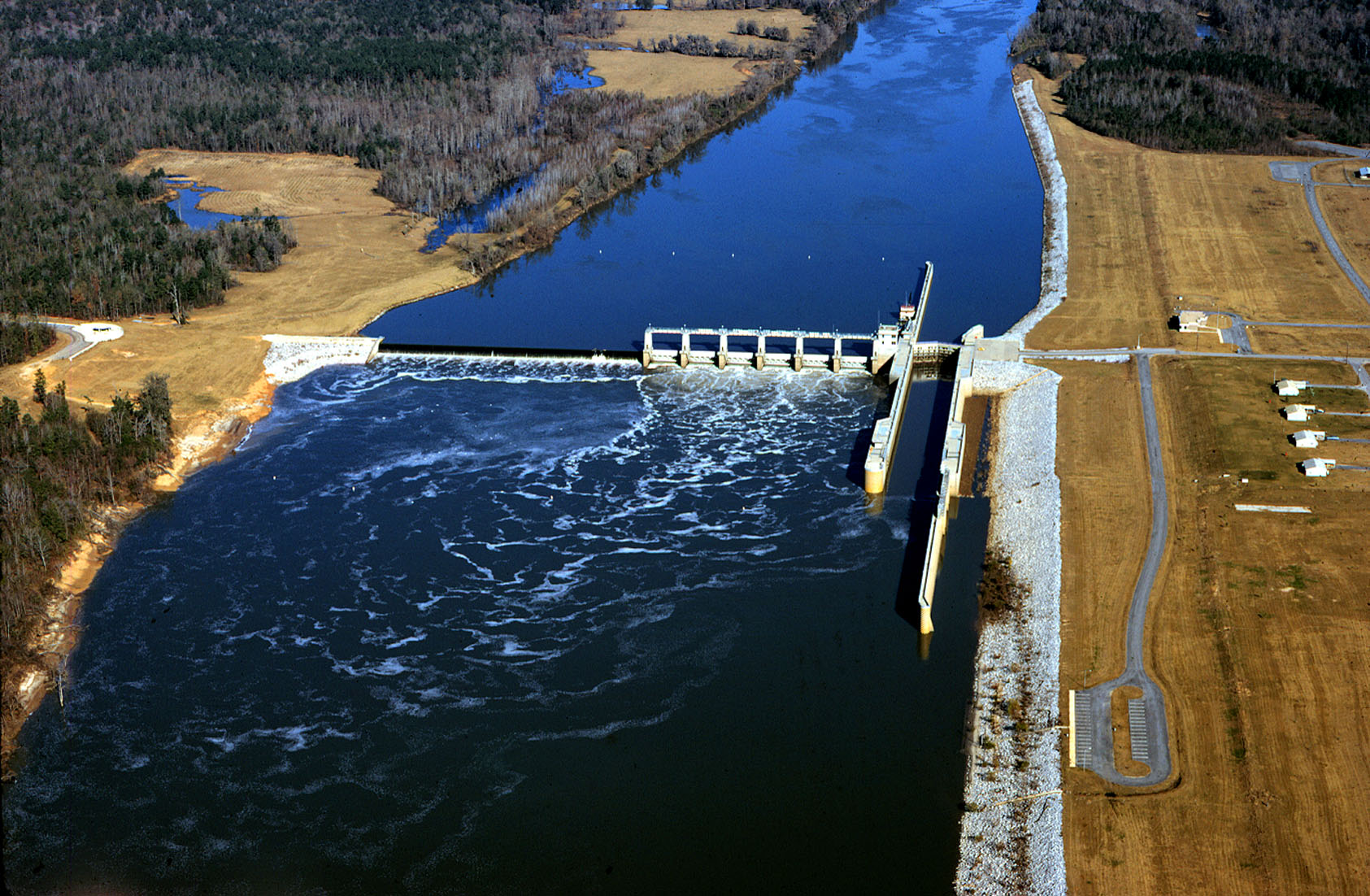
Claiborne Lock and Dam on the Alabama River, approximately 5 miles (8 km) upriver from Claiborne, Monroe County

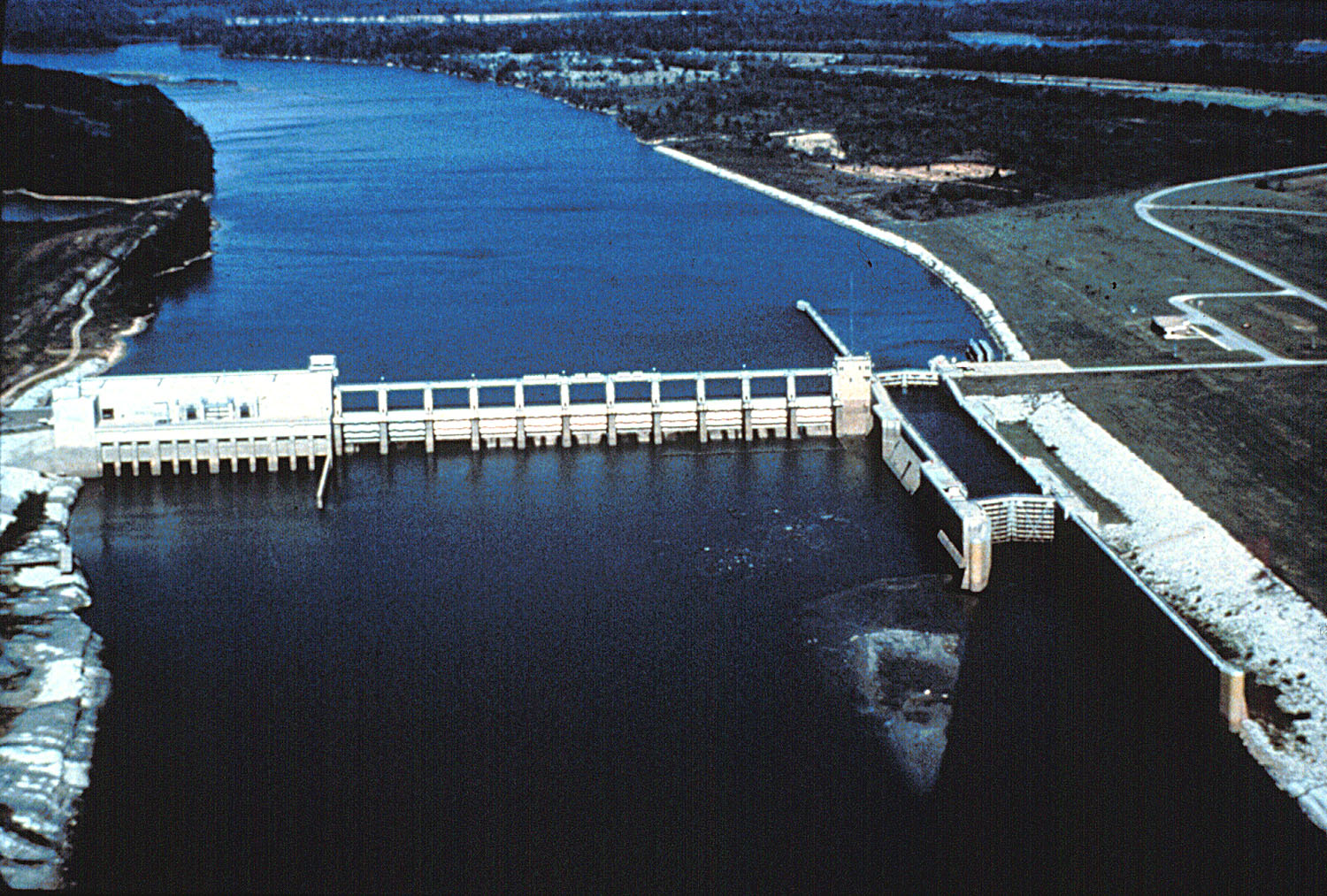
Robert F. Henry Lock and Dam on the Alabama River, approximately 15 miles (24 km) east of Selma

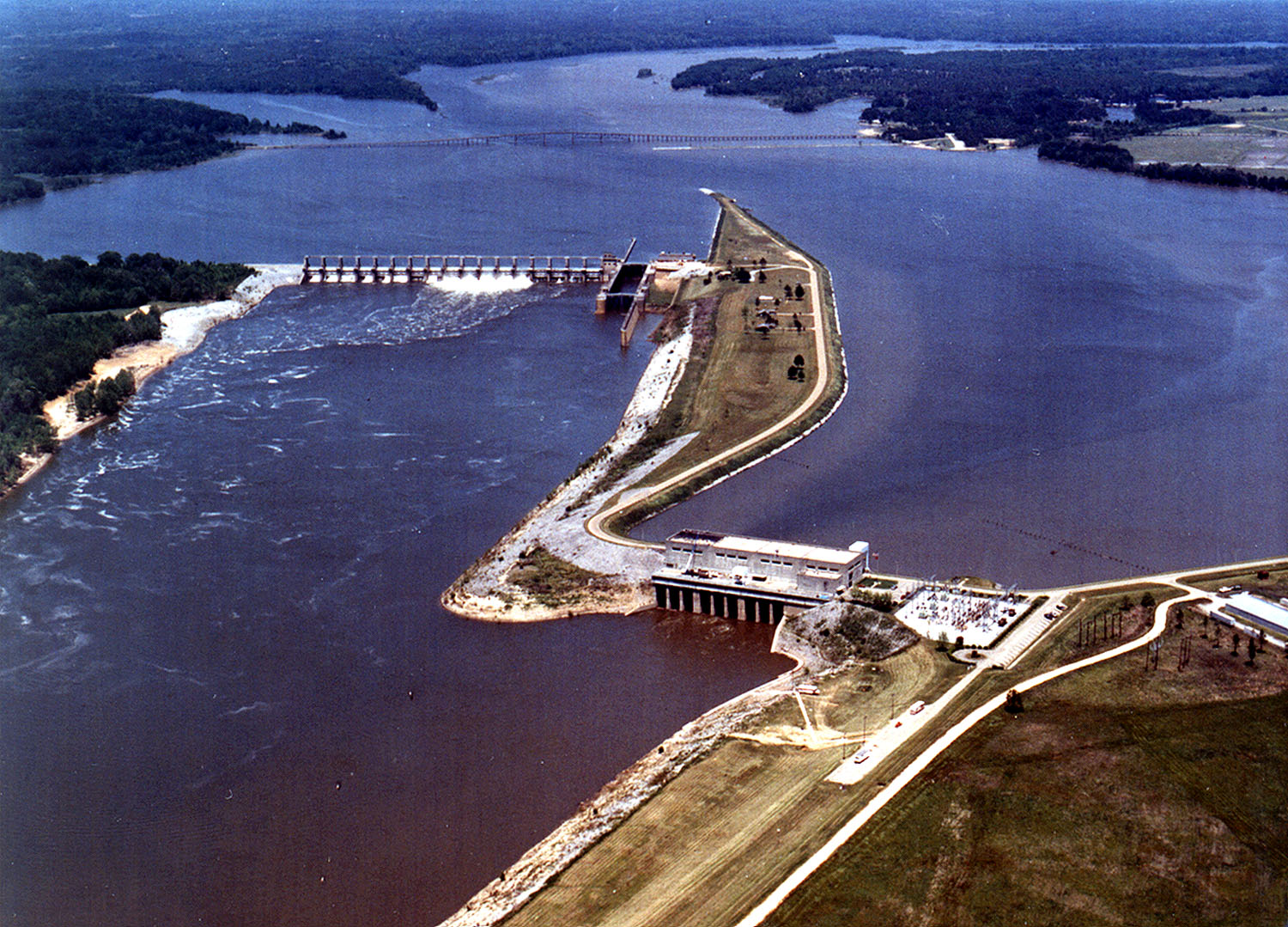
Millers Ferry Lock and Dam on the Alabama River in Wilcox County, approximately 9.5 miles (15.3 km) northwest of Camden

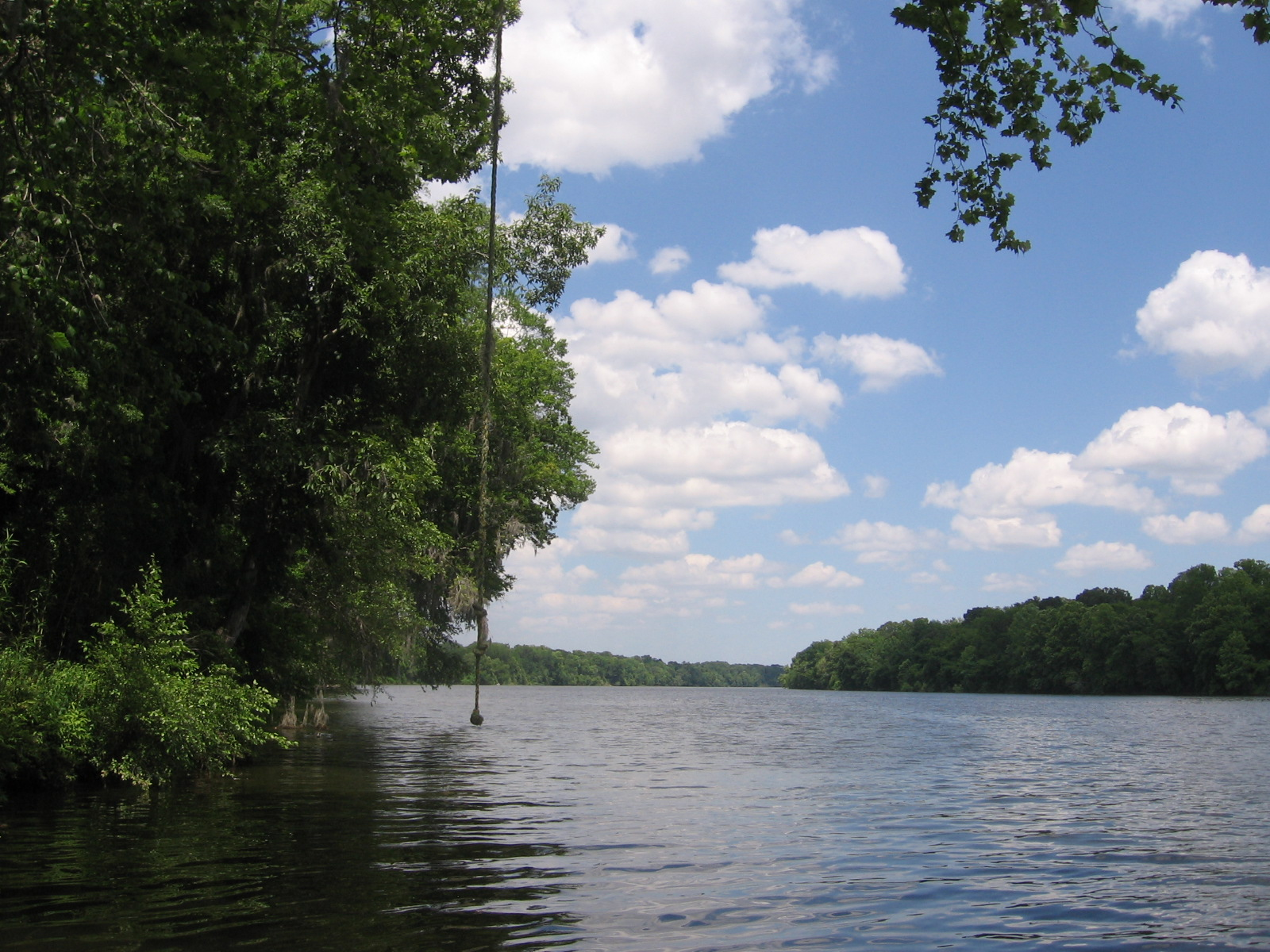
Alabama River in Dallas County looking upstream towards Selma.

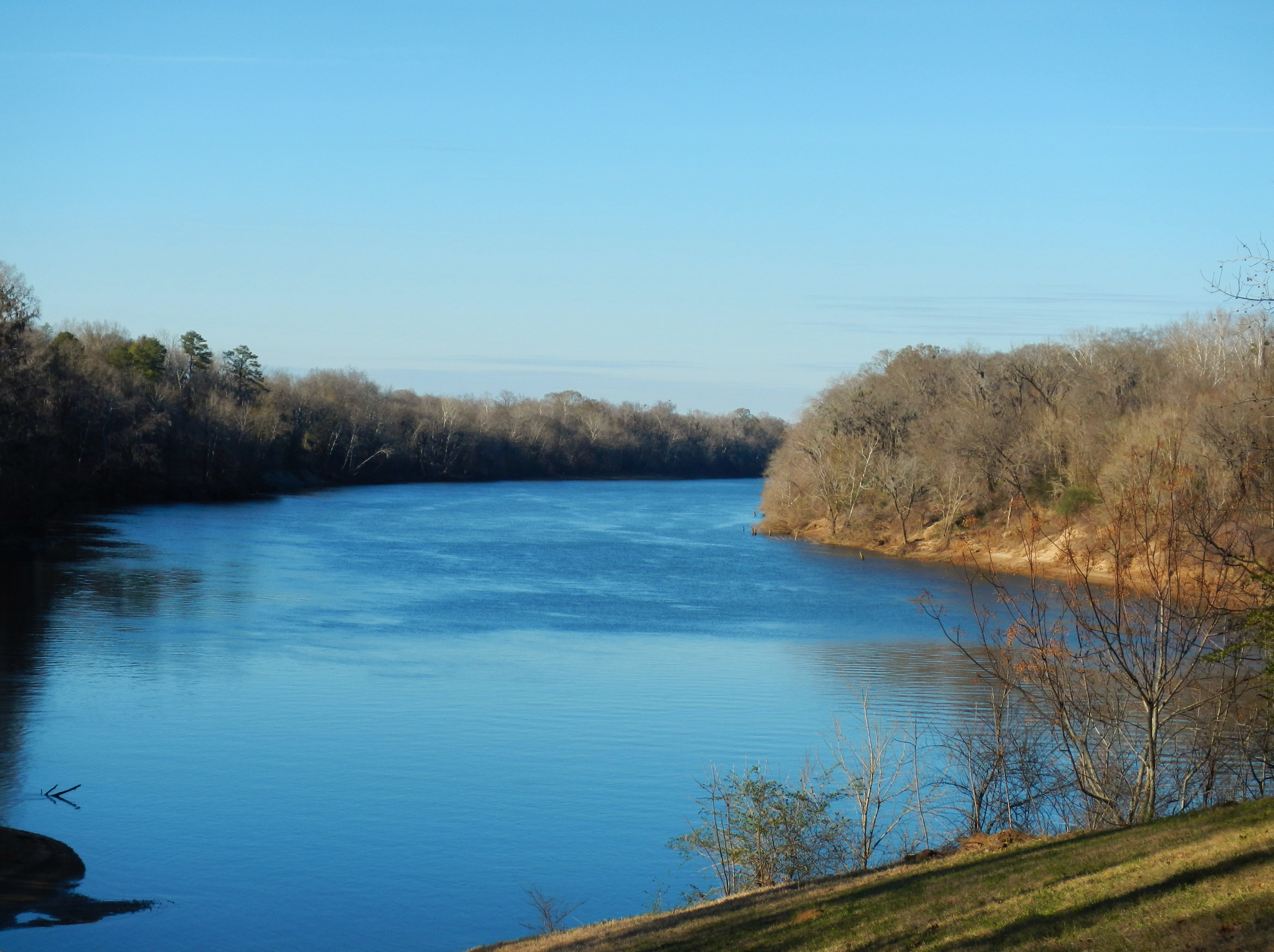
The Alabama River in Lowndes County as seen from Benton Park in Benton, Alabama.

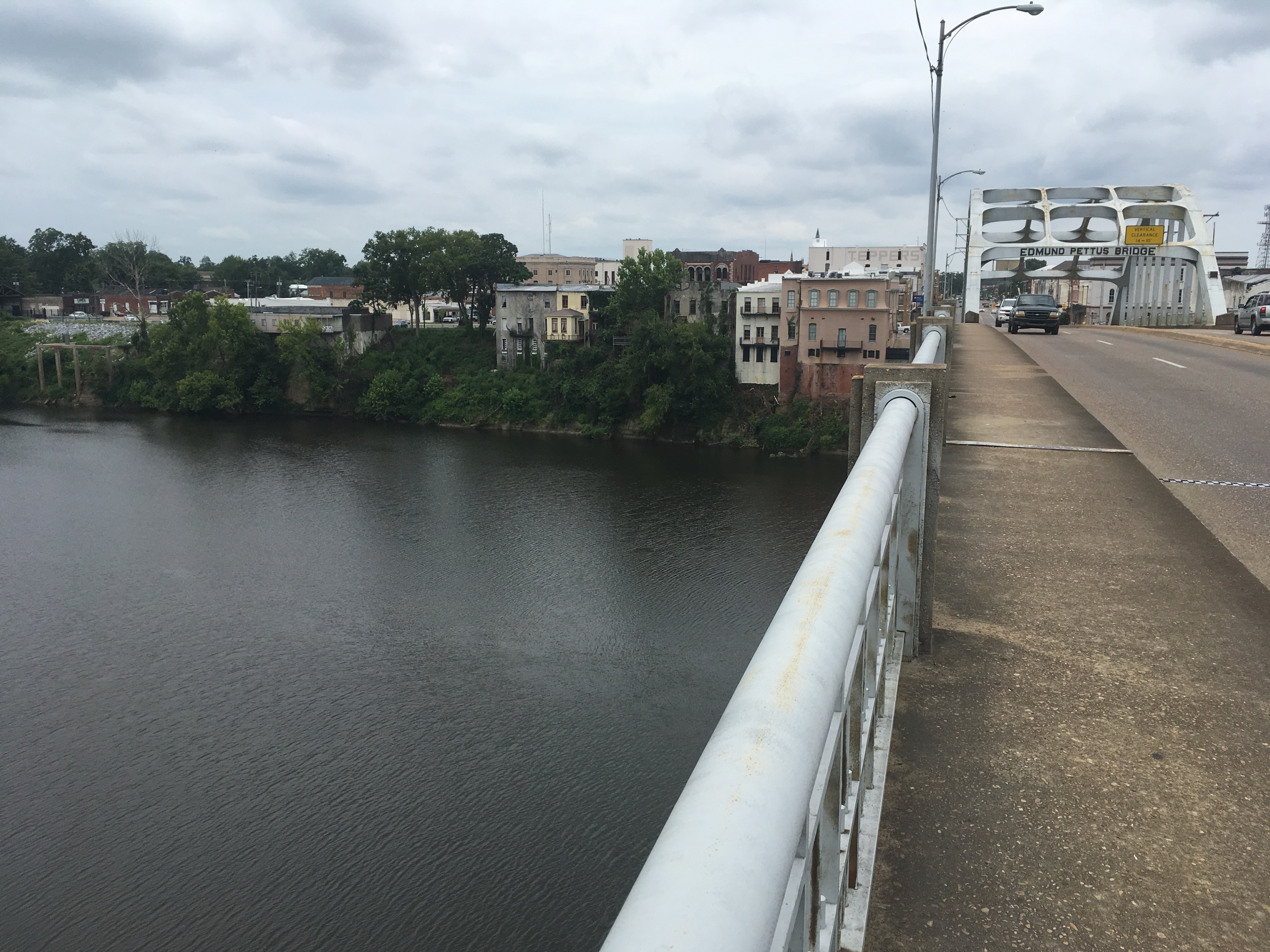
The Edmund Pettus Bridge in Selma overlooking the Alabama River.

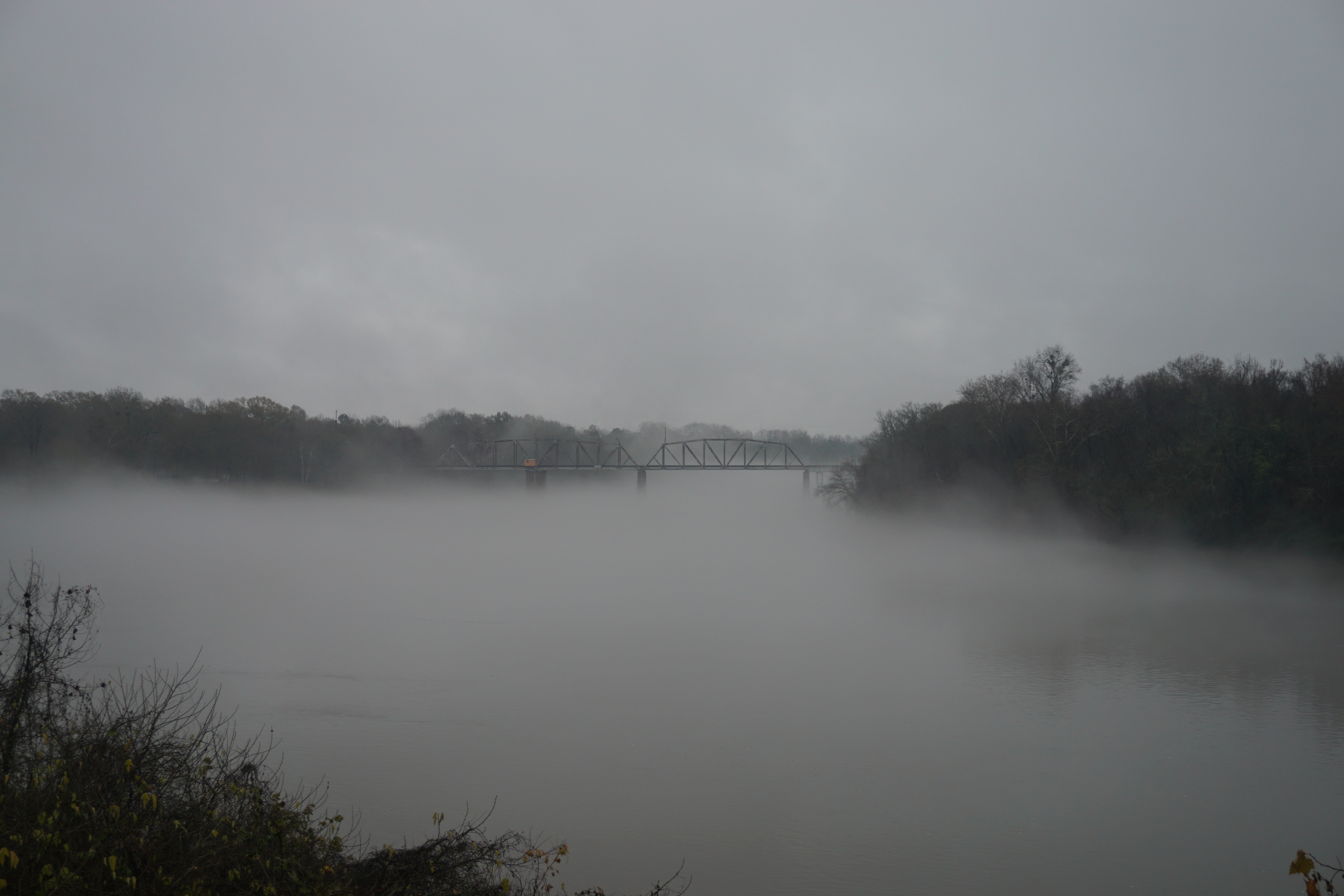
The Alabama River in Selma

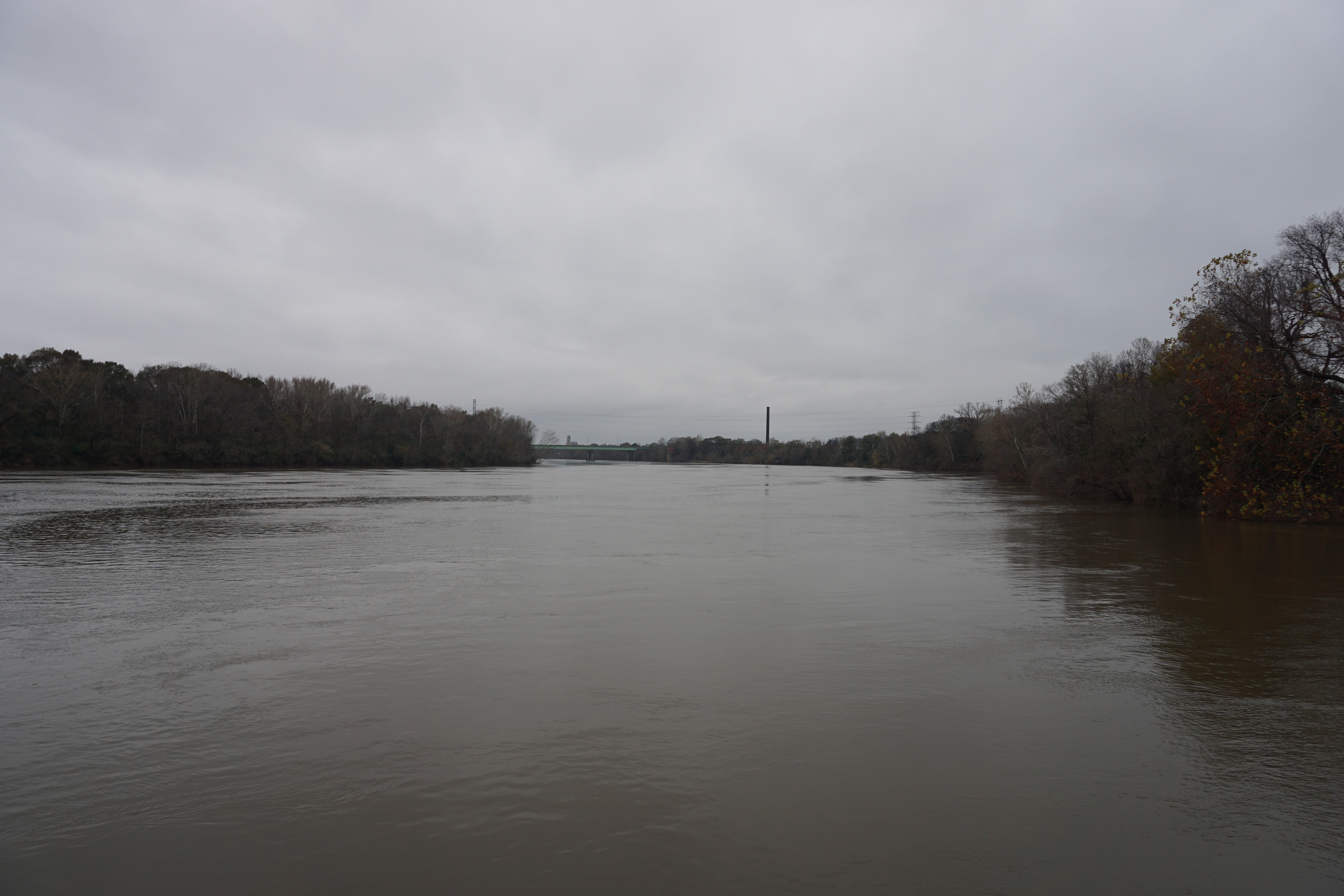
Alabama River at Riverfront Park in Montgomery

== See also ==
- List of Alabama rivers
- Tallapoosa River
- Coosa River
- Mobile River
- South Atlantic-Gulf Water Resource Region
