= Royal D. Suttkus =

Ichthyologist, founder of a fish collection

- Born: May 11, 1920; Bellville, Ohio, US
- Died: December 28, 2009 (aged 89); Atlanta, Georgia, US
- Known for: Royal D. Suttkus Fish Collection

Academic background
- Education: Ph.D.
- Alma mater: Cornell University
- Thesis: A Taxonomic Study of Five Cyprinid Fishes Related to Notropic hypselopterus of the Southeastern United States (1951)
- Doctoral advisor: Edward Raney

Academic work
- Discipline: Ichthyology
- Institutions: Tulane University

Royal Dallas Suttkus (May 11, 1920, Bellville, Ohio – December 28, 2009, Atlanta, Georgia) was an ichthyologist and biology professor responsible for creating the Royal D. Suttkus Fish Collection, one of the largest of its kind. It houses approximately 7 million post-larval specimens of fishes. The collection is part of the Tulane University Biodiversity Research Institute and the Tulane University Museum of Natural History.

== Biography of Royal D. Suttkus ==
=== Early life and education ===
Royal Dallas Suttkus was born in 1920 in Bellville, Ohio. His parents were John Albright Suttkus and Myna Louise Suttkus (née Schultz), and he was the third of their four children. Starting in childhood, he had the nickname "Sut". During his childhood, he acquired an interest in natural history through much involvement in outdoor activities in natural environments. In 1939, he enrolled at Michigan State University to study wildlife management. However, the military demands of World War II depleted the university of suitable faculty for a wildlife management major, and Suttkus switched to a zoology major. It was in this way that Suttkus was first introduced to ichthyology as a formal course of study.

Suttkus joined the ROTC while attending Michigan State University, training in field artillery. Beginning in early 1943, he became a member of the United States Army as a second lieutenant in the 686th Field Artillery Battalion. Suttkus served in the European Theatre of War, including the Battle of the Bulge. His military duty ended in June 1946, after having been promoted to captain.

After his military duty, Suttkus returned to higher education, as a graduate student at Cornell University under academic advisor Edward Raney. During this time, he began collecting biological specimens, especially fish, and made significant contributions to the Cornell Ichthyology Collection. Also during this time Suttkus began collection of fish specimens from the Gulf South Region. His doctoral thesis at Cornell University was on the Pteronotropis species group.

=== Academic career ===
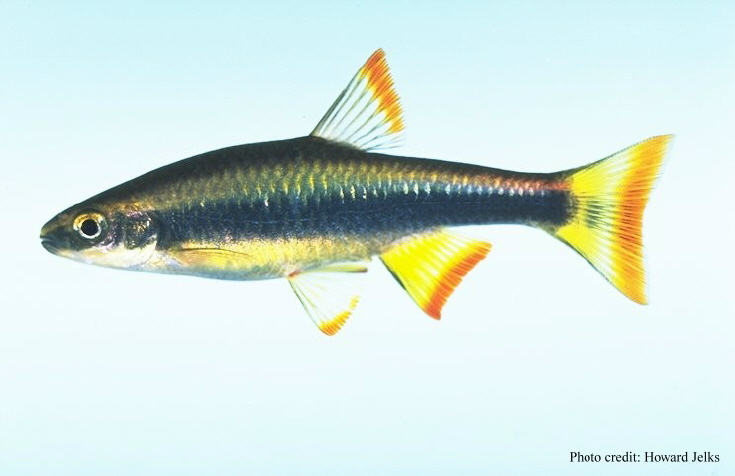
Pteronotropis signipinnis Syn. Notropis signipinnis Bailey & Suttkus, 1952

Suttkus joined the zoology faculty at Tulane University in New Orleans, Louisiana USA, in the Fall of 1950. This faculty appointment preceded the completion of his doctoral work at Cornell University, which was complete in mid-1951. In his new faculty position, Suttkus assumed a variety of responsibilities in teaching and research. He continued to work on specimen collections throughout his academic career.

Beginning in 1963 and extending until 1968, Suttkus served as principal investigator for the Environmental Biology Training Program, sponsored by the National Institutes of Health, to train students in field investigations. Also, early in his academic career, Suttkus began a variety of activities as a consultant, mostly on environmental and zoological surveys. The consultantships supplemented his university salary. In these activities, he continued to build the ichthyology collection. At times, his investigations and collaborations with other academic scientists took him into areas of zoology beyond fishes.

As he collected specimens, he identified 35 previously unknown fish species.

Suttkus established a collaboration with Tulane University paleontologist Harold E. Vokes. This collaboration aided in Suttkus's efforts in scientific naming and taxonomy as he built the ichthyology collection.

In 1975, Suttkus founded the Southeastern Fisheries Council, a non-profit scientific organization dedicated to the "study and conservation of freshwater and coastal fishes of the southeastern United States".

Suttkus officially retired from his professorship at Tulane University in 1990, although he continued academic pursuits with emeritus status. During his academic career, he authored 122 scientific publications and served as thesis advisor for 24 graduate students.

=== Personal life ===
In mid-1947 Suttkus met Elizabeth Robinson while he was working a summer job with the New York Fish and Game Commission. They were married in December 1947 and had four children.

Suttkus retired fully in 2000, although he continued to donate fish specimens, field notes, and other materiel to the Royal D. Suttkus Fish Collection. His home in Ocean Springs, Mississippi, was heavily damaged in Hurricane Katrina. Following the devastation, what remained of his ichthyology research materials in his home were donated to the Royal D. Suttkus Fish Collection. Suttkus died on December 28, 2009.

== Royal D. Suttkus Fish Collection ==
Royal D. Suttkus Fish Collection
- Housed at: Tulane University Biodiversity Research Institute
- Curators: Henry L. Bart, director Justin Mann, collection manager
- Website: https://www.tubri.org/fishes/

The Royal D. Suttkus Fish Collection is an ichthyology research collection of approximately 7 million post-larval specimens of fishes. It is part of the Tulane University Biodiversity Research Institute and the Tulane University Museum of Natural History. Royal D. Suttkus is the eponym for the collection.

In building the collection, Suttkus was rigorous in that he archived every specimen that he collected and he returned to the same site at regular time intervals for further collection. In this way, he minimized bias in the collection, which has rendered it useful for other researchers.

The collection is located at 3705 Main Street, Belle Chasse, Louisiana 70037 USA. It is housed in two buildings that once were used to store ammunitions for the United States Navy. The bunkers on the site that are used to house the collection are elevated for protection from floods and hurricanes.

=== History of the collection ===
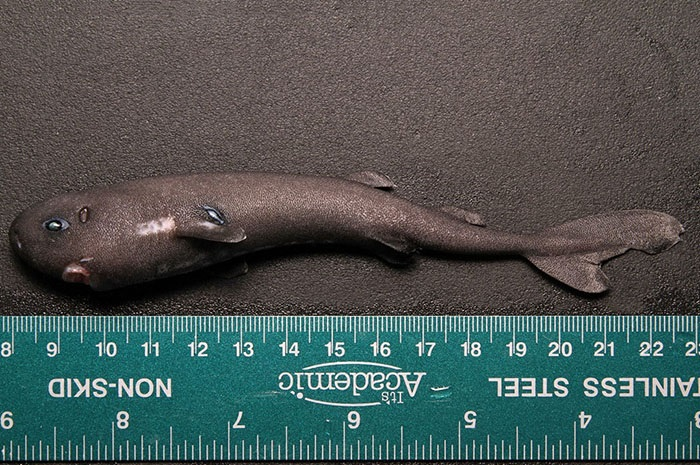
Pocket shark, specimen at the Royal D. Suttkus Fish Collection, one of two specimens of this species in the world

Tulane University had a natural history collection dating back to the 1880s, early in the history of the university. The collection existed as a museum, numbering approximately 170,000 specimens at its peak in the early 20th century. Following the end of the tenure of zoologist George Eugene Beyer as curator of the museum's collection, the collection fell into a period of neglect, eventually being disbanded in 1955.

In the first several years following World War II, Tulane University revitalized its efforts in natural history. In particular, the university hired as faculty members herpetologist Fred R. Cagle, botanist Joseph A. Ewan, invertebrate zoologist George H. Penn, and Royal D. Suttkus. From the beginning of his tenure as a faculty member at Tulane University, Suttkus concentrated on building an ichthyology collection that could be used for research purposes.

The Royal D. Suttkus Fish Collection began as the Tulane University Museum of Natural History. As Suttkus built the collection, by 1968 with approximately 2 million specimens, it outgrew its original location on the main campus of the university. At that time it relocated to the parcel of land that Tulane University acquired from the United States Navy, and it had been briefly used by the Central Intelligence Agency. This location became the F. Edward Hébert Riverside Research Laboratory.

In March 2017, the collection acquired 85,000 new specimens as the University of Louisiana at Monroe closed its own fish collection to re-purpose its facility. The collection also completed digitization of its holdings in order to facilitate research, in an effort funded by the National Science Foundation.

In 1989, as Tulane University was preparing for Suttkus's retirement, the university commissioned a group of suitable experts to evaluate the collection and to make a recommendation on its fate. The experts concluded that the university should maintain the collection and characterized the collection as "a treasure of great national and international importance". The collection is for research purposes and is not open to the general public.

== Representative publications ==
- Suttkus, Royal D. "Order lepisostei." Fishes of the Western North Atlantic, Memoir 1 (1963): 61–88.
- Suttkus, Royal D. "Notropis rafinesquei, a new cyprinid fish from the Yazoo River system in Mississippi." Bulletin of the Alabama Museum of Natural History 10 (1991).
- Jones, Clyde, and Royal D. Suttkus. "Colony structure and organization of Pipistrellus subflavus in southern Louisiana." Journal of Mammalogy 54.4 (1973): 962–968.
- Sundararaj, Bangalore I., and Royal D. Suttkus. "Fecundity of the spotted seatrout, Cynoscion nebulosus (Cuvier), from Lake Borgne area, Louisiana." Transactions of the American Fisheries Society 91.1 (1962): 84–88.

== Eponyms ==
The following species were named in Suttkus's honor:

- Chaunax suttkusi Caruso, 1989.
- Microdesmus suttkusi C. R. Gilbert., 1966 (Spotside wormfish)
- Notropis suttkusi J. M. Humphries & Cashner, 1994 (Rocky shiner)
- Percina suttkusi B. A. Thompson, 1997 (Gulf logperch)
- Scaphirhynchus suttkusi J. D. Williams & Clemmer, 1991 (Alabama sturgeon)
