= List of lakes of Alabama =

The qualifications for this list of Alabama lakes is that the lake contains sports fish, is open to the public and is managed by Alabama Department of Conservation and Natural Resources or other state or federal agencies. Swimming and/or boating are permitted in some of these lakes, but not all.

See: Alabama List of national forests of the United States

== Alabama State public fishing ==
The Alabama Wildlife and Freshwater Fisheries Division, Department of Conservation and Natural Resources, manages 23 public lakes in 20 counties throughout the state. These lakes range in size from 13 to 184 acres (0.7 km^{2}) for a total of 1,912 acres (8 km^{2}). Since the program was initiated in the late 1940s, its purpose has remained unchanged: provide quality fishing at an affordable price in areas of Alabama that lack sufficient natural waters to meet the needs of the public. All lakes were originally stocked with largemouth bass, bluegill (bream), redear sunfish (shellcracker), and channel catfish. White crappie and black crappie have become established in many lakes. Channel catfish are stocked in every lake during the fall. Hybrid striped bass and rainbow trout are stocked annually in designated lakes.

=== District 1 ===
- Fayette County Lake is a 60-acre (240,000 m^{2}) lake located 6 miles (10 km) southeast of Fayette off County Road 26. Fayette County is a prohibition or dry county.
- Lamar County Lake is a 68-acre (280,000 m^{2}) lake located 8 miles (13 km) west of Vernon on Alabama State Route 18, then 5 miles (8 km) north off County Road 21. Lamar County is a prohibition or dry county.
- Madison County Lake is 105 acres (0.4 km^{2}) lake located 11 miles (18 km) east of Huntsville.
- Marion County Lake is a 37-acre (150,000 m^{2}) lake located 6 miles (10 km) north of Guin off U.S. Route 43. Marion County is a prohibition or dry county.
- Walker County Lake is a 163 acres (0.7 km^{2}) lake located 3 miles (5 km) southeast of Jasper off old U.S. Route 78.
  - Bankhead Lake

=== District 2 ===
- Clay County Lake is a group of 3 lakes of 13-, 23-, and 38-acre (150,000 m^{2}) lakes located 1 mile (2 km) west of Delta on Alabama Highway 47. Clay County is a prohibition or dry county.
- DeKalb County Lake is a 120 acres (0.5 km^{2}) lake located 1 mile (2 km) north of Sylvania off County Road 47. DeKalb County is a prohibition or dry county.

=== District 3 ===
- Bibb County Lake is a 100 acres (0.4 km^{2}) lake located 5 miles (8 km) north of Centreville off Alabama State Route 5. Bibb County is a prohibition or dry county.
- Dallas County Lake is a 100 acres (0.4 km^{2}) lake located 11 miles (18 km) south of Selma off Alabama Highway 41.

its only one

=== District 4 ===
- Chambers County Lake is a 183 acres (0.7 km^{2}) lake located 5 miles (8 km) southeast of La Fayette on Chambers County Road 83. Chambers County Lake has a courtesy pier by the boat ramp.
- Lee County Lake is a 130 acres (0.5 km^{2}) lake located 6 miles (10 km) southeast of Opelika. Take Alabama Highway 169 south from I-85 then 1 mile (2 km) west on Lee County Road 146. Lee County Lake is the only lake with fishermen cabins and has a courtesy pier by the boat ramp.
- Weiss Lake is in Cherokee County and occupies 32,000 acres (130 km^{2}). It is known nationwide as the "Crappie Capital of the World."

=== District 5 ===
- Escambia County Lake or Leon Brooks Hines Lake is a 184-acre (0.7 km^{2}) lake located in the Conecuh National Forest 23 miles (37 km) east of Brewton off Co. 11. The coordinates of Escambia County Lake are 31°01′45″N 86°49′50″W
- Monroe County Lake is a 94-acre (380,000 m^{2}) lake located 5 miles (8 km) west of Beatrice off County Road 50. (From Monroeville take Alabama State Route 21 north to Beatrice, then left on Alabama State Route 265 for a 1/4 mile (0.40 km), then left on Robins Street (County Road 50) for 2 1/2 miles (4.0 km) to the lake.) The coordinates of Monroe County Lake are 31°43′17″N 87°15′46″W. Monroe County is a prohibition or dry county.
- Washington County Lake or J. Emmett Wood Lake is an 84-acre (340,000 m^{2}) lake located 2 miles (3 km) west of Millry off County Road 34. The coordinates of Washington County Lake are 31°37′15″N 88°21′0″W. Washington County is a prohibition or dry county.

=== District 6 ===
- Barbour County Lake is a 75-acre (300,000 m^{2}) lake located 6 miles (10 km) north of Clayton off County Road 49.
- Coffee County Lake (lake closed). Coffee County is a prohibition or dry county.
- Crenshaw County Lake is a 53-acre (210,000 m^{2}) lake located 5 miles (8 km) south of Luverne off U.S. Route 331.
- Dale County Lake or Ed Lisenby Lake is a 92-acre (370,000 m^{2}) lake located 1 mile (2 km) north of Roy Parker Road (Dale County Road 36) in Ozark.
- Geneva County Lake consists of two lakes, 33- and 32 acres (130,000 m^{2}) in size, located 20 miles (32 km) southwest of Enterprise off County Road 63. Geneva County is a prohibition or dry county.
- Pike County Lake is a 45-acre (180,000 m^{2}) lake located 5 miles (8 km) south of Troy off County Road 39.

== Public reservoirs ==
Public Reservoirs in Alabama
Reservoir	Nearby Town	River Basin	Surface Acres	Elevation MSL	Maintained By
Aliceville	Aliceville	Tombigbee	8,300	136.0	Army Corps of Engineers
Bankhead	Hueytown	Warrior	9,200	255.1	Army Corps of Engineers, Alabama Power
Bartlett's Ferry	Fairfax	Chattahoochee	5,860	521.0	Georgia Power
Bear Creek (Big Bear)	Red Bay	Tennessee	670	576.0	Tennessee Valley Authority
Big Creek	Mobile	Escatawpa	3,600	110.0	City of Mobile, Alabama
Cedar Creek	Russellville	Tennessee	4,200	580.0	Tennessee Valley Authority
Claiborne	Monroeville	Alabama	5,930	35.0	Army Corps of Engineers
Coffeeville	Jackson	Tombigbee	8,500	32.5	Army Corps of Engineers
Columbia	Columbia	Chattahoochee	1,540	102.0	
Dannelly	Selma	Alabama	17,200	80.0	Army Corps of Engineers
Demopolis	Demopolis	Tombigbee	10,000	73.0	Army Corps of Engineers
Eufaula	Eufaula	Chattahoochee	45,180	190.0	Army Corps of Engineers
Gainesville	Gainesville	Tombigbee	6,400	109.0	Army Corps of Engineers
Gantt	Andalusia	Conecuh	2,747	197.8	Alabama Electric Cooperative
Goat Rock	Phenix City	Chattahoochee	1,000		Georgia Power
Guntersville	Guntersville	Tennessee	69,100	595.0	Tennessee Valley Authority
Holt	Tuscaloosa	Warrior	3,296	87.0	Army Corps of Engineers
Inland	Oneonta	Warrior {Blackburn}	1,536	770.0	Birmingham Water Board
Jones Bluff	Montgomery	Alabama	12,510	125.0	Army Corps of Engineers
Jordan	Wetumpka	Coosa	6,800	252.0	Alabama Power
Lay	Columbiana	Coosa	12,000	396.0	Alabama Power
Little Bear Creek	Red Bay	Tennessee	1,560	620.0	Tennessee Valley Authority
Logan Martin	Talladega	Coosa	15,260	465.0	Alabama Power
Martin	Alexander City	Tallapoosa	39,000	490.0	Alabama Power
Millers Ferry	{See Dannelly}	Alabama			Army Corps of Engineers
Mitchell	Clanton	Coosa	5,850	312.0	Alabama Power
Montgomery	{See Jones Bluff}	Alabama			Army Corps of Engineers
Neely Henry Lake	Gadsden	Coosa	11,235	508.0	Alabama Power
Oliver	Phenix City	Chattahoochee	3,000		
Oliver	Tuscaloosa	Warrior	2,220	149.0	Army Corps of Engineers
Opelika City	Opelika	Tallapoosa	565		
Pickwick	Florence	Tennessee	41,515	418.0	Tennessee Valley Authority
Point A	Andalusia	Conecuh	700	169.7	Alabama Electric Cooperative
Purdy	Birmingham	Cahaba	1,050	551.0	Birmingham Water Board
R. L. Harris	Wedowee	Tallapoosa	10,661	793.0	Alabama Power
R E 'Bob' Woodruff	{See Jones Bluff}	Alabama			Army Corps of Engineers
Shelby	Gulf Shores	Gulf of Mexico	862		
Smith	Cullman, Jasper, & Winston	Warrior {Sipsey}	21,200	510.0	Alabama Power
Thollocco	Ozark	Choctawhatchee	604		
Thurlow	Tallassee	Tallapoosa	585	288.8	Alabama Power
Tuscaloosa	Tuscaloosa	Warrior {North Branch}	5,885	223.2	City of Tuscaloosa
Upper Bear Creek	Haleyville	Tennessee	1,850	797.0	Tennessee Valley Authority
Warrior	Eutaw	Warrior	9, 100	96.0	Army Corps of Engineers
Wedowee	{See R L Harris}	Tallapoosa			Alabama Power
Weiss	Centre	Coosa	30,200	564.0	Alabama Power
West Point	Lanett	Chattahoochee	25,864	635.0	Army Corps of Engineers
Wheeler	Decatur	Tennessee	68,300	556.3	Tennessee Valley Authority
Wilson	Florence	Tennessee	15,930	507.5	Tennessee Valley Authority
Yates	Tallassee	Tallapoosa	1,980	344.0	Alabama Power

== Other public lakes ==
- Lake Eufaula (Also extends into Georgia)
- Gantt Lake
- Lake Guntersville - The largest lake in Alabama
- Lake Harding (Also extends into Georgia)
- Holt Lake
- Inland Lake
- Lake Jackson (Also extends into Florida)
- Lay Lake
- Little Bear Creek Reservoir
- Logan-Martin Lake
- Lake Lurleen
- Neely Henry Lake
- Lake Pickwick (Also extends into Mississippi)
- Lake Purdy
- Ski Lake
- Smith Lake
- Lake Tholocco
- Lake Tuscaloosa
- Upper Bear Creek Reservoir
- Lake Wedowee-Randolph County
- William Bill Danelly Reservoir

=== Mobile County ===
Lake	Coordinates
Big Chippewa	31.03°N 87.98°W
Big Creek	30.74°N 88.34°W
David	31.10°N 87.97°W
Dead	30.89°N 87.99°W
Duck	30.78°N 88.04°W
Gator	30.25°N 88.09°W
Haas	30.86°N 88.21°W
Little Chippewa	31.03°N 87.97°W
Louts	31.07°N 87.97°W
McLean	30.64°N 88.15°W
Oleander	30.25°N 88.08°W
Sheppard	31.11°N 87.97°W
Spring	30.64°N 88.38°W
Zedol	30.99°N 87.97°W

== See also ==
- Fishing in Alabama
- List of lakes in the United States
- List of dams and reservoirs in Alabama
