= List of dams and reservoirs in Alabama =

This article lists the dams and reservoirs in Alabama. In 2015, the U.S. Army Corps of Engineers estimated that the state has about 2,271 dams.

== Reservoirs and manmade lakes with known dams ==
Dam	Reservoir/Lake	River
Bartlett's Ferry Dam	Lake Harding	Chattahoochee River
Bankhead Dam	Bankhead Lake	Black Warrior River
Bear Creek Dam	Bear Creek Reservoir	Bear Creek
Big Creek Dam	Big Creek Lake	Big Creek
Cedar Creek Dam	Cedar Creek Reservoir	Cedar Creek
Coffeeville Lock and Dam	Coffeeville Lake	Tombigbee River
Claiborne Lock and Dam	Claiborne Lake	Alabama River
Demopolis Lock and Dam	Demopolis Lake	Tombigbee River
Gantt Dam	Gantt Lake	Conecuh River
Goat Rock Dam and Generating Plant	Goat Rock Lake	Chattahoochee River
Guntersville Dam	Guntersville Lake	Tennessee River
Holt Lock and Dam	Holt Lake	Black Warrior River
Howell Heflin Lock and Dam	Gainesville Lake	Tennessee-Tombigbee Waterway
Jordan Dam	Jordan Lake	Coosa River
Lake Tuscaloosa Dam	Lake Tuscaloosa	North River
Lay Dam	Lay Lake	Coosa River
Little Bear Creek Dam	Little Bear Creek Reservoir	Little Bear Creek
Logan Martin Dam	Logan Martin Lake	Coosa River
Martin Dam	Lake Martin	Tallapoosa River
Millers Ferry Lock and Dam	William "Bill" Dannelly Reservoir	Alabama River
Mitchell Dam	Mitchell Lake	Coosa River
Neely Henry Dam	Neely Henry Lake	Coosa River
North Highlands Dam	Bibb Pond	Chattahoochee River
Optimist Lake Dam	Milkhouse Creek Reservoir	Dog River Watershed
Point A Dam	Point A Lake	Conecuh River
R.L. Harris Dam	Lake Wedowee (a. k. a. R.L. Harris Lake)	Tallapoosa River
Robert F. Henry Lock and Dam	R.E."Bob" Woodruff Lake	Alabama River
Lewis Smith Dam	Lewis Smith Lake	Black Warrior River
Yates Dam	Lake Yates	Tallapoosa River
Thurlow Dam	Lake Thurlow	Tallapoosa River
Tom Bevill Lock and Dam	Aliceville Lake	Tennessee-Tombigbee Waterway
Upper Bear Creek Dam	Upper Bear Creek Reservoir	Bear Creek
Walter Bouldin Dam	Jordan Lake	Coosa River
Walter F. George Lock and Dam	Walter F. George Lake (a. k. a. Lake Eufaula)	Chattahoochee River
Warrior Lock and Dam (a.k.a. Armistead I. Selden)	Warrior Lake	Black Warrior River
Weiss Dam	Weiss Lake	Coosa River
Wheeler Dam	Wheeler Lake	Tennessee River
William Bacon Oliver Lock and Dam	Lake Oliver	Black Warrior River
Wilson Dam	Wilson Lake	Tennessee River

== See also ==
- List of dam removals in Alabama
- List of dams and reservoirs in the United States
- List of dams and reservoirs of the Tennessee River
- List of lakes
- List of lakes in Alabama
