= Fishing in Alabama =

The U.S. state of Alabama has a diversity of freshwater and saltwater sport fishing within its extensive rivers systems, farm ponds and the inshore and offshore saltwater of the Gulf of Mexico. The Bass Angler's Sportsman Society (B.A.S.S.), a promoter of competitive bass fishing, was founded by Ray Scott in 1967 in Montgomery, Alabama. Alabama hosts numerous local, regional and national fishing tournaments every year. According to the Alabama Department of Conservation and Natural Resources, the state supports 11 million angler fishing days with expenditures of three-quarters of a billion dollars.

Alabama hosts 47 reservoirs larger than 500 acres (2.0 km^{2}) that cover 551,220 acres (2,230.7 km^{2}), 23 Alabama State Public Fishing Lakes, and 77,000 miles (124,000 km) of perennial rivers, streams and the Mobile Delta as well as over 60 miles (97 km) of shoreline along the Gulf Coast that provide fresh and saltwater fishing opportunity.

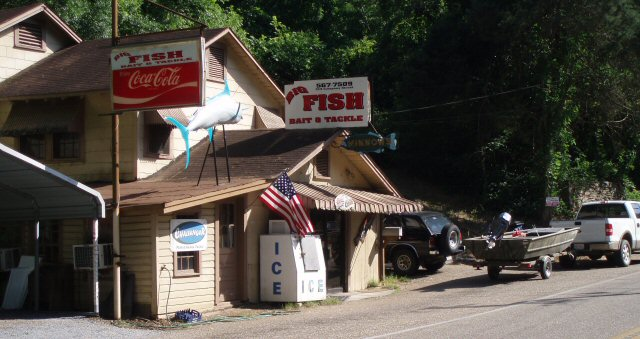
A typical bait shop, found throughout the state near fishable waters

== Freshwater fishing ==
The Official Freshwater Fish of Alabama is the Largemouth Bass. In general, Alabama freshwater fishing is a warm-water fishery, although stocked trout are available in several locations. The most targeted species are largemouth and smallmouth bass, spotted bass, crappie, brim (bluegill, shellcracker, etc.), stripe (white bass, striped bass and hybrids) as well as catfish. There are limited fisheries for shoal bass, walleye and sauger. Big rivers and reservoirs dominate the freshwater fishing landscape in Alabama but there is also an abundance of small streams, creeks and ponds available. The Tennessee Valley Authority, US Army Corps of Engineers, Alabama Power, and the Alabama Department of Natural Resources all maintain and promote freshwater fishing access on the waters they oversee.

=== State Freshwater Records ===
Below is a table of state freshwater fishing records.

Species	Weight	Date	Location
Bass, Largemouth	16 lb 8 oz	11/3/1987	Mtn. View Lake, Shelby Co
Bass, Redeye (b)	3 lb 2 oz	3/8/2000	Choccolocco Creek
Bass, Rock	1 lb 6 oz	5/6/1995	Paint Rock River
Bass, Shoal (now protected in Alabama, release when captured)	6 lb 11 oz	2/25/1996	Halawakee Creek
Bass, Smallmouth (c)	10 lb 8 oz	10/8/1950	Wheeler Dam tailwater
Bass, Spotted (b)	8 lb 15 oz	3/18/1978	Lewis Smith
Bass, Striped	55 lb	1955	Tallapoosa River
Bass, Striped Hybrid	25 lb 15 oz	9/13/1996	Sipsey Fork
Bass, White	4 lb 9 oz	2/14/1987	Warrior River
Bass, Yellow (a)	2 lb 8 oz	4/12/2000	Guntersville Reservoir, Jackson Co.
Bowfin	18 lb 6 oz (8.3 kg)	7/31/2005	Lake Tuscaloosa
Buffalo	57 lb	4/13/1990	Guntersville Reservoir
Bullhead	3 lb 13 oz	4/8/1984	Private Pond, Montgomery. Co.
Carp, Common	35 lb	4/19/1980	Bear Creek, Colbert County
Carp, Grass	73 lb	4/10/2012	Guntersville Reservoir
Catfish, Blue (b)	120 lb 4 oz	3/9/2012	Holt Reservoir
Catfish, Channel	40 lb	6/17/1967	Inland Lake
Catfish, Flathead	80 lb	6/22/1986	Alabama River, Selma
Catfish, White	10 lb 5 oz	4/3/1981	Chambers Co. Public Lake
Crappie, Black (tie)	4 lb 5 oz	6/2/1997	private pond in Jefferson Co.
Crappie, White	4 lb 9 oz	5/8/2000	Lake Martin, Tallapoosa Co.
Drum, Freshwater (b)	41 lb 8 oz	7/24/1949	Wilson Reservoir
Eel, American	5 lb 8 oz	5/11/1989	Lake Shechi, Chilton Co.
Gar, Alligator	151 lb 5 oz	8/13/2004	Tensaw River
Gar, Longnose	32 lb 14oz	4/18/1985	Jordan Reservoir
Gar, Spotted	8 lb 12 oz	8/26/1987	Cotaco Creek
Herring, Skipjack	3 lb 4 oz	5/2/2012	Mulberry Fork
Muskellunge	19 lb 8 oz	12/31/1972	Wilson Dam tailwater
Paddlefish	52 lb 12 oz	3/18/1982	Wilson Dam tailwater
Perch, Yellow	1 lb 15 oz	2/26/2000	Wheeler Reservoir, Limestone Co.
Pickerel, Chain	6 lb 6 oz	6/24/1976	Dyas Creek, Baldwin County
Pickerel, Redfin	0 lb 11 oz	8/24/2010	Armstrong Creek, Wash. Co.
Redhorse, Silver (a)	14 lb 14 oz	4/24/1995	Wilson Dam tailwater
Sauger	5 lb 2 oz	3/5/1972	Wilson Dam tailwater
Sunfish, Bluegill (a)	4 lb 12 oz	4/9/1950	Ketona Lake, Birmingham
Sunfish, Green	1 lb 9 oz	8/10/2005	McLamore Pond, Walker County
Sunfish, Longear	8 oz	5/12/1990	Yellow River
Sunfish, Redbreast	1 lb 4 oz	6/12/2010	Choctawhatchee River
Sunfish, Redear (b)	4 lb 4 oz	5/5/1962	Chattahoochee State Park
Trout, Rainbow	9 lb 1 oz	4/22/2006	Mud Creek, Tannehill State Park
Walleye	10 lb 14 oz	6/24/1980	Weiss Reservoir
Warmouth	1 lb 12 oz	4/25/1986	Farm Pond
(a) World Record, Rod And Reel (b) Previous World Record, Rod and Reel (c) Previous World Record, Any Method

== Saltwater fishing ==
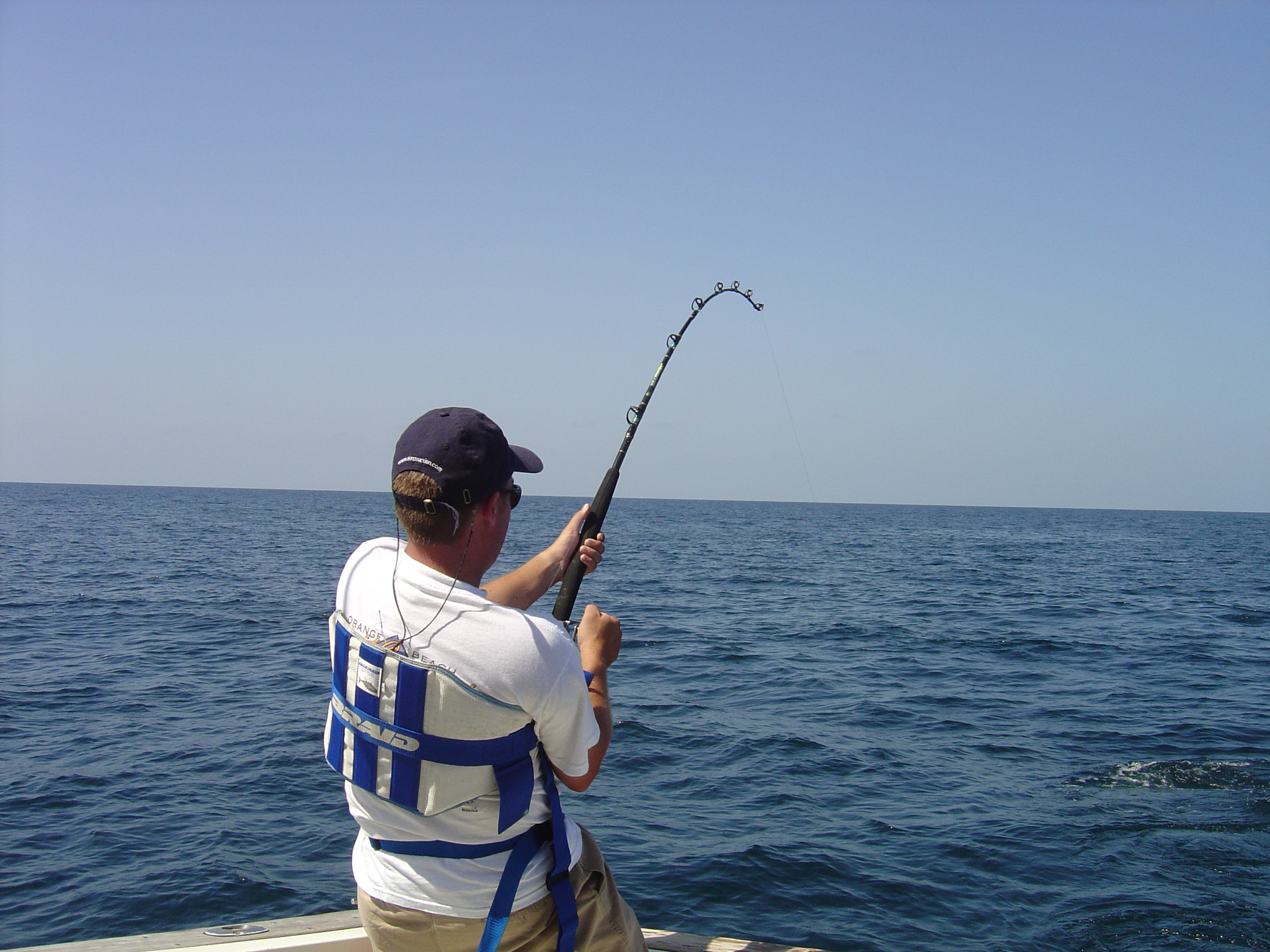
Deep Sea Fishing In Gulf of Mexico

Alabama has excellent access to the offshore waters of the Gulf of Mexico from Mobile and Perdio Bays. Inshore and estuarial fishing opportunities are extensive in both upper and lower Mobile Bay, but extend from Grand Bay in the Mississippi Sound on the West to the western shores of Peridio Bay near Orange Beach, Alabama.

The Official Saltwater Fish of Alabama is the Tarpon.

=== State Saltwater Records ===
Species	Weight	Date
Amberjack, Greater	127 lb12oz	06/19/81
Angelfish, Blue	2 lb3z	04/29/01
Barracuda, Great	52 lb4oz	07/15/05
Barrelfish	12 lb 0 Oz	07/07/06
Bass, Longtail	5 lb 10 Oz	07/15/06
Bass, Striped	55 lb 0 Oz	06/22/76
Bigeye	3 lb 2 Oz	06/28/06
Bluefish	17 lb 4 Oz	06/05/04
Bonito, Atlantic	5 lb 5 Oz	12/31/94
Brotula, Bearded	19 lb 8 Oz	08/09/97
Catfish, Gafftopsail	8 lb 13 Oz	07/11/92
Catfish, Sea	3 lb 1 oz	5/2/2012
Chub, Bermuda	10 lb 5 Oz	6/17/2006
Chub, Yellow	7 lb 4 Oz	10/22/2002
Cobia	117 lb 7 Oz	4/18/1995
Creolefish	0 lb 13 Oz	1/28/2004
Crevalle Jack	39 lb 4 Oz	8/20/1994
Cubbyhu	2 lb 3 oz	7/13/2013
Croaker, Atlantic	4 lb 0 Oz	9/3/1994
Doctorfish	1 lb 4 Oz	9/13/2007
Dolphinfish, Common	60 lb 0 Oz	5/27/1989
Dolphinfish, Pompano	4 lb 2 oz	6/30/2012
Drum, Black	61 lb 0 Oz	4/20/2002
Drum, Red	45 lb 9 oz	7/9/2013
Escolar	62 lb 7 Oz	04/27/03
Filefish	8 lb 8 Oz	10/12/1991
Flounder, Southern	13 lb 3 Oz	10/15/1975
Grouper, Black	106 lb 3.2 Oz	8/11/2012
Grouper, Gag	74 lb 8 Oz	1963
Grouper, Red	34 lb 10 Oz	3/23/2002
Grouper, Scamp	29 lb 10 Oz	07/22/00
Grouper, Snowy	52 lb 9 Oz	07/07/06
Grouper, Warsaw	226 lb 0 Oz	07/18/88
Grouper, Yellowedge	46 lb 9.2 oz (21.13 kg)	6/30/2012
Hake, Southern	3 lb 4.5 oz (1.49 kg)	4/23/2006
Hind, Red	2 lb 14 Oz	07/17/87
Hind, Rock	3 lb 7.2 oz	7/17/2012
Hind, Speckled	39 lb 13 oz	5/28/2011
Jack, Almaco	47 lb 8 Oz	05/11/02
Jack, Horse-eye	15 lb 5 oz	7/10/2007
Kingfish, Gulf/Southern	2 lb 15 Oz	09/04/01
Ladyfish	4 lb 8 Oz	07/28/06
Little Tunny	21 lb 0 Oz	1956
Lookdown	2 lb 2 Oz	08/24/97
Mackerel, King	69 lb 10 oz	5/6/2012
Mackerel, Spanish	8 lb 12 Oz	10/19/93
Marlin, Blue	845 lb 13 oz	7/12/2013
Marlin, White	98 lb 13 Oz	05/24/97
Moonfish, Atlantic	1 lb 0 Oz	08/12/03
Mullet, Striped	1 lb 2 Oz	06/14/03
Pinfish	3 lb 2 Oz	05/15/01
Pompano, African	39 lb 7 Oz	09/09/89
Pompano, Florida (Tie)	5 lb 8 Oz	11/11/99 & 10/21/03
Porgy, Red	7 lb 6 Oz	06/16/91
Porgy, Whitebone	5 lb 10 oz	7/17/2011
Puffer, Smooth	10 lb 3 oz	4/2/2013
Rosefish, Blackbelly	4 lb 13 Oz	07/13/12
Runner, Rainbow	19 lb 9 Oz	09/10/06
Runner, Blue	11 lb 2 Oz	06/28/97
Sailfish, Atlantic	81 lb 0 Oz	1974
Seabass, Black	3 lb 2 Oz	07/31/00
Searobin, Blackwing	1 lb (0.45 kg) 13 Oz	04/24/05
Seatrout, Sand/Silver	6 lb (2.7 kg) 11 Oz	07/12/97
Seatrout, Spotted	12 lb (5.4 kg) 4 Oz	05/06/80
Shark, Atl.Sharpnose	16 lb (7.3 kg) 3 Oz	05/12/06
Shark, Bull	336 lb (152 kg) 8 Oz	8/3/2012
Shark, Lemon	278 lb (126 kg) 8 Oz	07/21/95
Shark, Mako	737 lb (334 kg) 0 Oz	08/20/78
Shark, Tiger	988 lb (448 kg) 8 Oz	06/24/90
Sharksucker	4 lb (1.8 kg) 7 Oz	05/12/04
Sheepshead	12 lb (5.4 kg) 15 Oz	11/20/01
Slimehead, Darwins	4 lb 0 oz	6/30/2012
Snapper, Cubera	52 lb (24 kg) 0 Oz	05/20/88
Snapper, Dog	13 lb 4 Oz	7/16/2004
Snapper, Gray	15 lb 11 Oz	7/3/2003
Snapper, Lane	8 lb 1 oz	7/15/2011
Snapper, Mutton	20 lb 12 Oz	6/25/2006
Snapper, Red	44 lb 12 Oz	6/1/2002
Snapper, Silk	6 lb 3 Oz	5/27/2006
Snapper, Vermilion	7 lb 3 Oz	6/6/1987
Snapper, Yellowtail	6 lb 15 oz	7/5/2011
Spadefish, Atlantic	6 lb 12 Oz	4/14/2003
Spearfish, Longbill	53 lb 0 Oz	5/29/1905
Squirrelfish	1 lb 1 Oz	8/4/2006
Stargazer, Southern	6 lb 4.5 Oz	4/13/2006
Stingray, Roughtail	160 lb 0 Oz	8/6/2000
Stingray, Southern	125 lb 0 Oz	8/20/1998
Swordfish	448 lb 0 Oz	9/16/2006
Tarpon	203 lb 0 oz	8/15/1992
Tilefish, Atlantic Golden	5 lb 0 oz	5/16/2012
Tilefish, Blue Line	6 lb 12 oz	5/29/2006
Tilefish, Great Northern	29 lb 4 oz	5/12/2007
Tilefish, Sand	2 lb 1 oz	7/24/2012
Triggerfish, Gray	13 lb 8 oz	5/31/1993
Triggerfish, Ocean	7 lb 10 oz	8/10/2013
Triggerfish, Queen	7 lb 8 oz	7/6/1999
Tripletail	37 lb 5 oz	1979
Tuna, Big Eye	107 lb 1 oz	8/2/2012
Tuna, Blackfin	35 lb 2 oz	7/1/2008
Tuna, Bluefin	829 lb 6 oz	6/3/2006
Tuna, Skipjack	32 b 6 oz	8/31/2013
Tuna, Yellowfin	22 1b 7.2 oz	6/3/2006
Wahoo	123 lb 6 oz	5/6/2006
Wreckfish	68 lb 6 oz	5/6/2006

== See also ==
- List of rivers in Alabama
- List of lakes in Alabama
- Bass Angler's Sportsman Society
- US Army Corps of Engineers - Lakes Gateway - Alabama
- Tennessee Valley Authority - Reservoir Sport Fishing
- Alabama Power Lake Recreation Information
- Bear Creek Lakes Recreation Area
- Alabama River Fishing
