= Sports in Birmingham, Alabama =

Sports in Birmingham, Alabama, include several minor league professional teams and college sports. The City of Birmingham and the Birmingham metro area have no major professional sport franchises. The Birmingham area is home to the Birmingham Barons, the AA minor league affiliate of the Chicago White Sox, which plays at Regions Field in the Southside adjacent to Railroad Park. The University of Alabama at Birmingham (UAB Blazers) and Samford University in Homewood have popular collegiate sports teams, including college basketball and football. The Hoover Metropolitan Stadium is home to the Southeastern Conference Baseball Tournament, which drew more than 108,000 spectators in 2006 and continues to draw large crowds today. The city also hosts a USL team: the Birmingham Legion FC. The Birmingham area also hosts the Alabama Youth Sports Alliance basketball league and Tragic City Rollers women's roller derby team.

Birmingham's Legion Field has hosted several college football postseason bowl games, including the Dixie Bowl (1948–49), the Hall of Fame Classic (1977–85), the All-American Bowl (1986–90), the SEC Championship Game (1992–93), the SWAC Championship Game (1999–2012), the Magic City Classic (1946–present) and, currently, the Birmingham Bowl (formerly the BBVA Compass Bowl, 2006–present). The Southeastern Conference, Southwestern Athletic Conference, and Gulf South Conference are also headquartered in Birmingham.

In 1996, Legion Field hosted early rounds of Olympic soccer where it drew record crowds. The field has also hosted men's and women's World Cup qualifiers and friendlies. The field has switched from natural grass to artificial turf, a controversial move that has people questioning the stadium's role as a professional soccer venue. In 2019, Legion Field was also the home of the Birmingham Iron of the Alliance of American Football.

The U.S. Paralympic Training Facility is located in Birmingham and was a primary filming location for the 2005 documentary film Murderball, about wheelchair rugby players.

== Current teams ==
Franchise	Founded	Sport	Venue	League	Championships
Birmingham Barons	1885	Baseball	Regions Field	Double-A (baseball)	14
Birmingham Bulls	2017	Ice hockey	Pelham Civic Center	SPHL	0
Birmingham Legion FC	2017	Soccer	Protective Stadium	USL Championship	0
Birmingham Squadron	2019	Basketball	Legacy Arena	NBA G League	0
Birmingham Miners	2021	Basketball	TBD	Maximum Basketball League	0
Birmingham Stallions	2021	Football	Protective Stadium	United Football League	3

== Recreation ==
Since 1998, Birmingham is a highlight for the sport of Fencing in the Southeast through the Birmingham Fencing Club. The local club hosts weekly classes for all skill levels and regional tournaments inviting competitors from across several nearby states. Notable competitors native to Birmingham include Luona Wang, 2010 Junior World Fencing Championships Bronze Medalist in Foil and Andrew Chen, 2016 North American Cup Gold Medalist in Foil Y10.

Recreational fishing is also immensely popular in the Birmingham area. Fish have been caught in 14 separate Alabama lakes which would be state records in 35 other states. Recently, Birmingham was named "Bass Capital of the World" by ESPN and Bassmaster magazine. Over the last several years, Birmingham has been home to numerous major fishing tournaments, including the Bass Masters Classic. Some of the more popular recreational lakes around Birmingham include: Smith Lake, Lay Lake, Lake Neely Henry, Lake Logan Martin, Lake Purdy, and Bankhead Reservoir.

== Defunct teams ==
Birmingham was home to the Black Barons, a very successful Negro league baseball team. The Black Barons played home games at Rickwood Field, which is still standing in the Rising-West Princeton neighborhood, and is verified as being the oldest baseball field in America.

The city has had several professional football franchises. The only pro football team currently in Birmingham is the Alabama Outlawz of X-League Indoor Football. Other teams included the two-time champion WFL franchise, the Birmingham Americans/Birmingham Vulcans—before the league folded. A USFL franchise, the Birmingham Stallions–once again the league folded. A WLAF franchise, the Birmingham Fire–the WLAF was renamed NFL Europa and the franchise became the Rhein Fire before the league folded altogether in 2007. A CFL franchise, the Birmingham Barracudas— would play one season and then fold as the league ended its American franchise experiment. An XFL franchise, the Birmingham Thunderbolts–another instance where the league folded. In 2019, the Birmingham Iron of the Alliance of American Football played part of one season before that league also folded.

Birmingham was also a home of professional ice hockey teams. The Birmingham Bulls were a professional ice hockey team that played in the World Hockey Association from 1976 to 1979 and the Central Hockey League from 1979 to 1981. The Bulls played their home games at the Birmingham–Jefferson Convention Complex. From 1992 to 2001, another Birmingham Bulls team that was a member of the East Coast Hockey League played at the Birmingham–Jefferson Convention Complex until it was relocated to Atlantic City, New Jersey.

== Recurring events ==
Motorsports are very popular in the Birmingham area and across the state, and the area is home to numerous annual motorsport races. The Aaron's 499 & AMP Energy 500 are NASCAR Sprint Cup races that occur in April and October at the Talladega Superspeedway. The Indy Grand Prix of Alabama shares the Barber Motorsports Park road course with Superbike and sports car GrandAm races.

The PGA Champions Tour has had a regular stop in the Birmingham area since 1992, with the founding of the Bruno's Memorial Classic, later renamed the Regions Charity Classic. In 2011 the tournament will be replaced by The Tradition, one of the Champions Tour's five "major" tour events.

Road running events such as the Vulcan 10K Run and Mercedes Marathon/Half Marathon are popular for both locals and out-of-state runners. Cycling (both mountain biking and road) is popular in the area. Nearby Oak Mountain State Park annually hosts the Bump N' Grind mountain bike (1995–present) race and the Xterra Southeast Championship triathlon as well as other endurance competitions.

== One-time events ==
On March 6–8, 2009, Birmingham hosted the U.S.A vs. Switzerland first round tie of the Davis Cup. In which, U.S. won 4–1.

Birmingham has served as the host of the 2022 World Games. The city was selected to host the event in 2021 but it was postponed, because of the COVID-19 pandemic. It was the first time that an American city has hosted the event since the inaugural games were held in Santa Clara, California in 1981.

== Venues ==
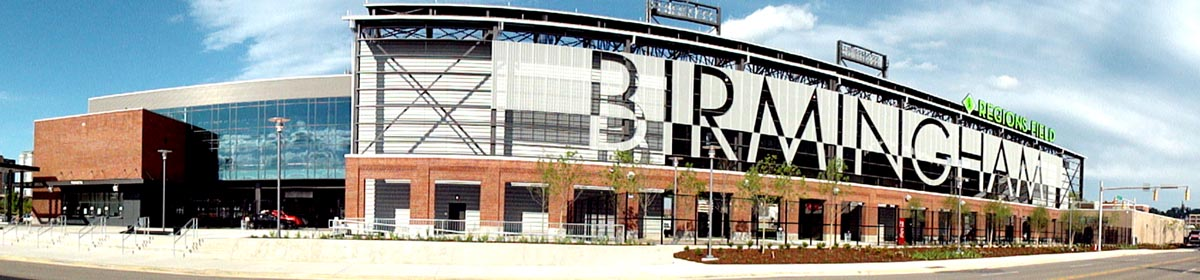
Regions Field is the home to the Birmingham Barons baseball team
- Bartow Arena
- Boutwell Auditorium
- Fair Park Arena
- Hoover Metropolitan Stadium
- Legacy Arena
- Legion Field
- Pelham Civic Center
- Regions Field
- Rickwood Field
- Protective Stadium
