= Cedar Creek Reservoir =

Cedar Creek Reservoir may refer to various reservoirs in the United States:

- Cedar Creek Reservoir (Alabama) in Franklin County
- Cedar Creek Reservoir (Texas) in Henderson and Kaufman Counties
