= Wilmer, Alabama =

Unincorporated community in Alabama, United States

- Unincorporated community
- Location within Alabama Location within the United States
- Coordinates: 30°49′24″N 088°21′41″W
- Country: United States
- State: Alabama
- County: Mobile
- Elevation: 249 ft (76 m)
- Time zone: UTC-6 (Central (CST))
  - Summer (DST): UTC-5 (CDT)
- ZIP code: 36587
- Area code: 251
- GNIS ID: 129064

Wilmer is an unincorporated community in Mobile County, Alabama, United States.

== History ==
Wilmer was named in honor of Richard Hooker Wilmer, the second bishop of Alabama in the Episcopal Church. A post office first opened under the name Wilmer in 1894. Wilmer's first mayor was Perry Walter Evans, who also founded Wilmer's fire department. In the 1990's Wilmer gained notoriety for changing the local speed limit on six different occasions in a short period of time, in large part reportedly as part of a speed trap scheme to raise local revenues.

== Demographics ==
Historical population
Census	Pop.	Note	%±
1970	426		—
1980	581		36.4%
1990	494		−15.0%
U.S. Decennial Census

Wilmer was an incorporated community, incorporating around 1970 (though just after the census was taken, as it did not formally appear until the 1980 U.S. Census, with the 1970 population figure when it was still unincorporated). It formally disincorporated effective September 30, 1993.

== Geography ==
Wilmer is located in southwest Alabama northwest of Mobile and near the Alabama-Mississippi border. The community lies on U.S. Route 98 and is two miles northwest of Big Creek Lake. The elevation is 249 feet (76 m).

== Education ==
Mobile County Public School System operates public schools serving the area.

Elementary schools with Wilmer, Alabama addresses include: Wilmer Elementary School (serving the area formerly within the municipality), Turner Elementary School, and Tanner Williams Elementary School, Areas within these boundaries are zoned to Semmes Middle School and Mary G. Montgomery High School.
