= Howell Heflin Lock and Dam =

Lock and dam structures

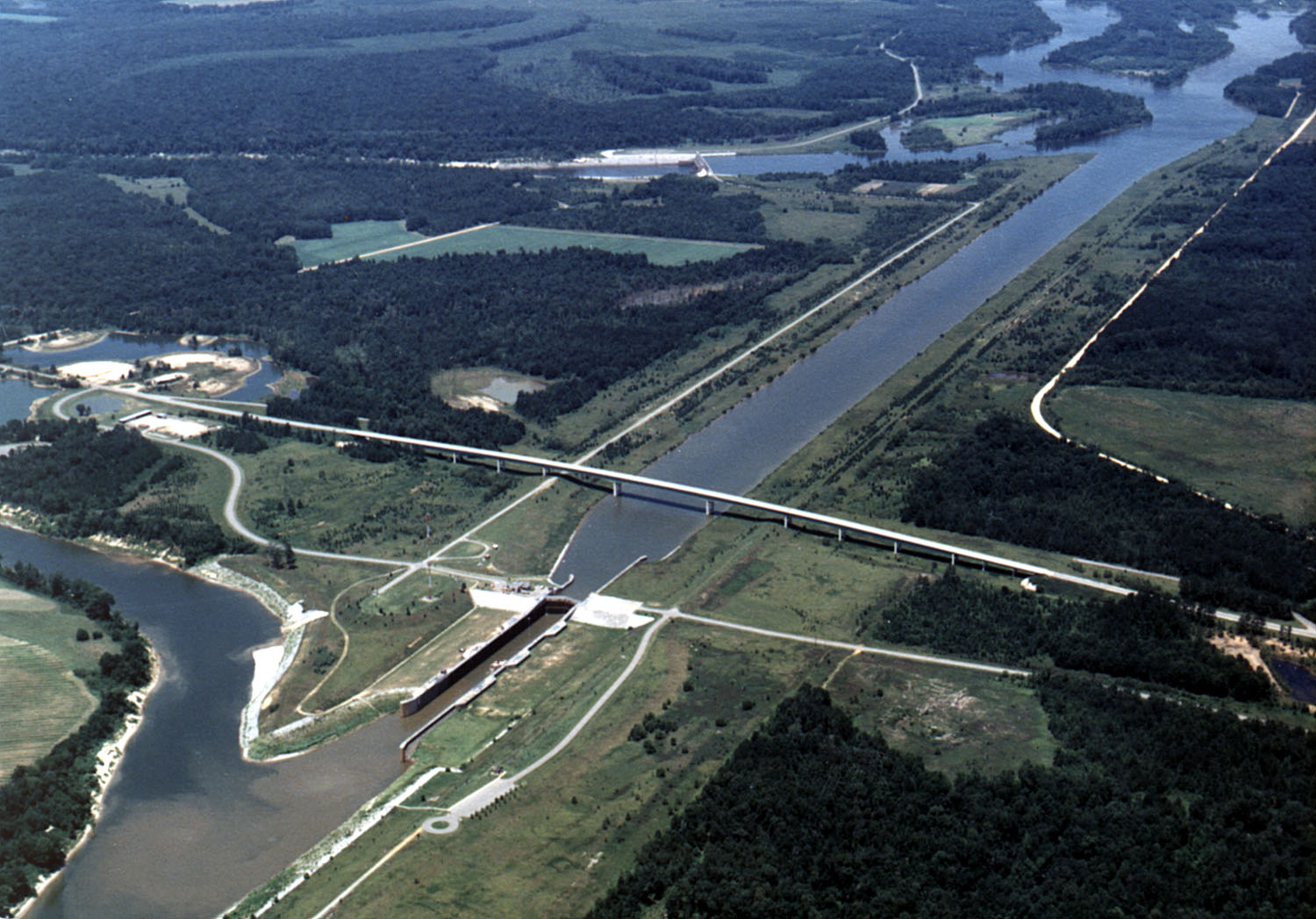
- Aerial view of Howell Heflin Lock and dam on the Tennessee-Tombigbee Waterway. The lock is visible in the foreground on a straightened and channelized section of the waterway. The dam (visible at top) is located on the original meandering path of the Tombigbee River.
- Interactive map of Howell Heflin Lock and Dam
- Coordinates: 32°50′12.86″N 88°8′8.73″W

The Howell Heflin Lock and Dam, formerly Gainesville Lock and Dam, is one of four lock and dam structures on the Tennessee-Tombigbee Waterway that generally lie along the original course of the Tombigbee River. It is located near Gainesville, Alabama, and impounds Gainesville Lake. It is named for Howell Heflin, a former United States Senator from Alabama.

== See also ==
- List of Alabama dams and reservoirs
