= Tom Bevill Lock and Dam =

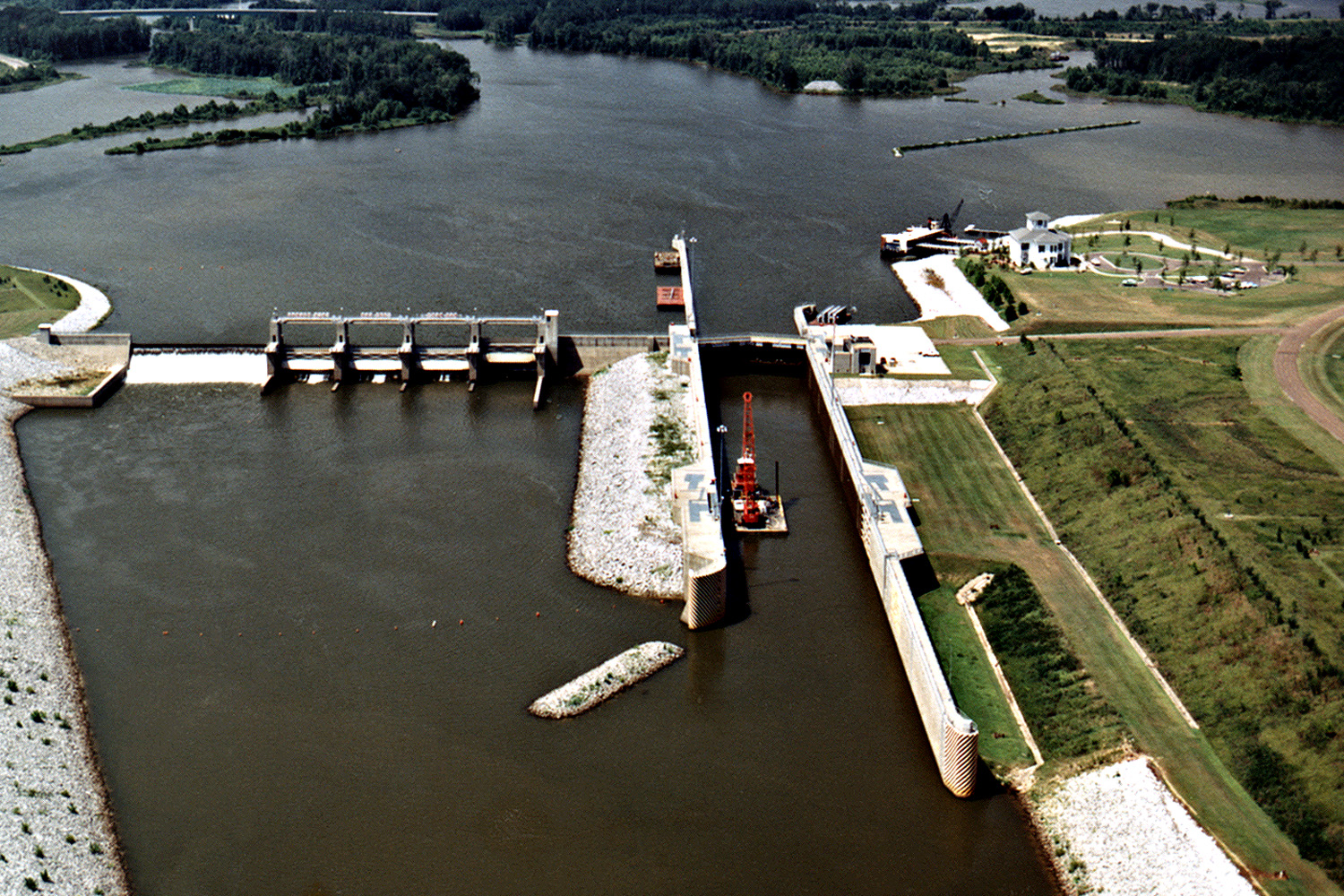
- Aerial view of Tom Bevill Lock and Dam on the Tombigbee River
- Interactive map of Tom Bevill Lock and Dam
- Coordinates: 33°12′38.4″N 88°17′16.18″W

Reservoir
- Creates: Aliceville Lake

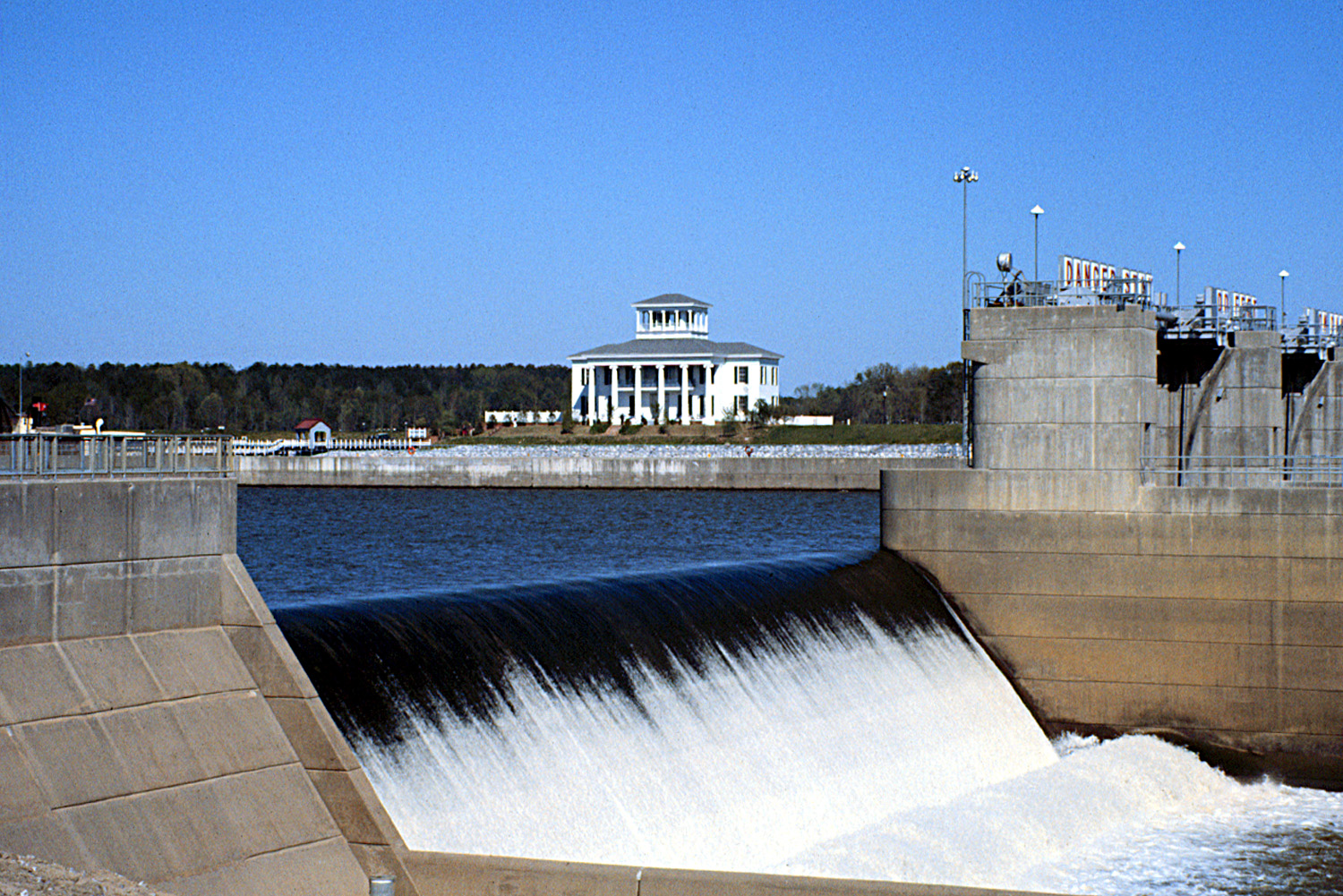
View across the dam to the visitor center.

The Tom Bevill Lock and Dam, formerly named Aliceville Lock and Dam and "Memphis Lock and Dam", is one of four lock and dam structures on the Tennessee-Tombigbee Waterway that generally lie along the original course of the Tombigbee River. It is located near Aliceville, Alabama and impounds Aliceville Lake. It is named for Tom Bevill, a proponent of the Tenn-Tom.

== See also ==
- List of Alabama dams and reservoirs
