= R.E. "Bob" Woodruff Lake =

Reservoir in central Alabama, USA

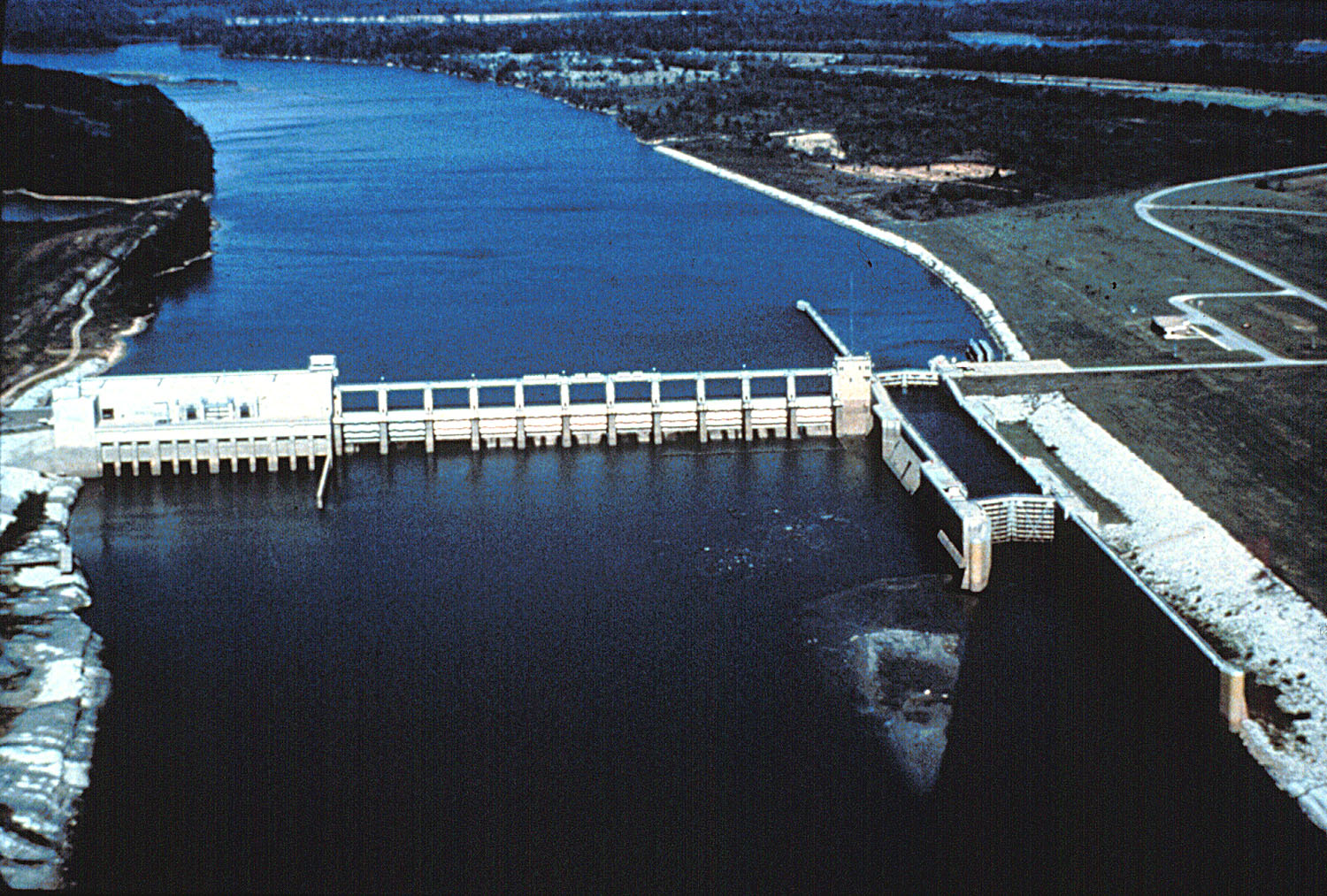
- Aerial view of the Robert F. Henry Lock and Dam and R.E. "Bob" Woodruff Reservoir

- Location within Alabama
- Location: Autauga, Lowndes, Montgomery, and Elmore counties, Alabama
- Coordinates: 32°19′35″N 86°46′57″W
- Type: Reservoir
- Primary inflows: Coosa River
- Primary outflows: Alabama River
- Basin countries: United States
- Max. length: 80 mi (130 km)
- Surface area: 20 sq mi (52 km^{2})

R.E. "Bob" Woodruff Lake is a lake on the Alabama River in central Alabama. Woodruff Lake stretches along 80 miles (130 km) of the Alabama River and has an area of about 20 square miles (52 km^{2}).

Woodruff Lake was made possible through the construction of the Robert F. Henry Lock and Dam which was completed in 1975. The dam backs up the river to a minimum depth of nine feet from the upper end of the William "Bill" Dannelly Reservoir to the Alabama Power Company's Walter Bouldin Dam on the Coosa River. The dam's power plant produces enough electricity to serve approximately 45,000 homes.

The lake's level varies little, making it an ideal location for outdoor activities. The lake provides for fishing, boating, water skiing, picnicking, camping, swimming, and hiking. The parks at the lake have beaches, campgrounds, picnic areas, and boat ramps.

== See also ==
- List of Alabama dams and reservoirs
