= Logan Martin Lake =

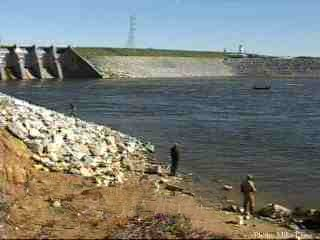
- Logan Martin Dam

- Location within Alabama Location within the United States
- Location: Calhoun / St. Clair / Talladega counties, Alabama, U.S.
- Coordinates: 33°27′0″N 86°19′10″W
- Type: Reservoir
- Basin countries: United States
- Max. length: 48.5 mi (78.1 km)
- Surface area: 17,000 acres (69 km^{2})
- Max. depth: 110 ft (34 m)
- Shore length^{1}: 275 mi (443 km)
- Islands: Several small island; One private island owned by The Yacht Club on Lake Logan Martin
- Settlements: Pell City
- ^{1} Shore length is not a well-defined measure.

Logan Martin Lake is a reservoir located in east central Alabama on the Coosa River approximately 30 miles (48 km) east of Birmingham, Alabama. This 17,000-acre (69 km^{2}) reservoir was built in 1965 by Alabama Power Company. The lake, nicknamed Lake of a Thousand Coves by locals, has 275 miles (443 km) of shoreline along its 48.5-mile (78.1 km) length sandwiched between Logan Martin Dam on the south and Neely Henry Dam on the north. The depth of the lake is 35 to 110 feet (34 m) with only three feet average water level variance.

The lake borders St. Clair and Talladega counties. The reservoir extends 48.5 miles (78.1 km) from Logan Martin Dam upstream to Neely Henry Dam, and it contains 15,263 acres (61.77 km^{2}). Logan Martin has roughly 273 miles (439 km) of shoreline.

Alabama has a lake of a similar name, the Lake Martin on the Tallapoosa River, but Lake Martin and Logan Martin Lake are not part of the same river system.

== Hydrology ==
Logan Martin Lake begins at the discharge of Neely Henry Dam near Ohatchee, Alabama (near the site of former Coosa River Lock 3) and extends south to Logan Martin Dam near Vincent, Alabama. The Coosa River is the primary inflow for the lake, in addition to numerous lakes and rivers. Prevailing flow is from the north to the south along a meandering course. The Coosa River arises in the Appalachian Mountains and its waters, and those of Logan Martin Lake, eventually discharge into Mobile Bay and the Gulf of Mexico through the Alabama River and Mobile River. The Lake is largely a run-of-the-river reservoir through its upper reaches. From the location of Lock 4 to the I-20 bridge, the river expands, but is still largely confined to the original course of the Coosa River and the immediate mouths of tributary streams rather than spreading over the floodplain like a typical reservoir. From the I-20 bridge in the Riverside area to the Logan Martin Dam (approximately 23 miles), the lake expands to a width much greater than the original river channel, with large areas of open water and many medium to large sized sloughs and creeks. The maximum depth at the dam is 69 feet (21 m).

== Geology ==
Logan Martin Lake is situated in the Northern Piedmont physiographic province of Alabama, characterized by generally low ridges at the very southern reach of the Appalachian Mountains. The reservoir lies primarily within the Ordovician Knox Group (OCk).

== Wildlife ==
Numerous aquatic species make their home in Logan Martin Lake with game and non-game fish being the dominant interest for human use. Numerous local and national fishing tournaments are held on the lake annually, the lake has also hosted championship events of the FLW Outdoors Tour and the Bassmaster Classic in 1992, 1993, and 1997. Large numbers of both largemouth and spotted bass inhabit the lake, as well as striped bass, white bass, hybrid bass, crappie, catfish (mostly of the channel variety), bream, drum, carp, and gar. Fish in Logan Martin lake are polluted with, in some cases, substantial amounts of Polychlorinated biphenyls (PCBs), originating from Choccolocco Creek, and ultimately Anniston, Alabama. The pollution culminated with several high-profile class action lawsuits in the early 2000s, one of which was led by attorney Johnnie Cochran.

== History ==
The Coosa River was long used for steamship navigation as far north as Rome, Georgia. An extensive series of locks allowed passage along shoals and ledges in the river. After steamships were replaced by roads and railroads, the site of proposed Lock 7 was selected for a large dam to provide hydropower, flood control, and recreation. Construction started on the gravity concrete and earth fill dam July 18, 1960 and it was placed in service August 10, 1964. Logan Martin Dam is named after William Logan Martin, Jr., a judge and Attorney General in Alabama in the early 20th century.

== Economy ==
Logan Martin Lake contributes millions of dollars annually to the communities surrounding the lake in the form of increased property values, expenditures by recreational visitors at local businesses, and low-cost hydropower for the state. Its proximity to the large population center of Birmingham leads to heavy use by recreational boaters during the summer, and it is also used for skiing and swimming.. The vast majority of the boat traffic is between I-20 and Logan Martin Dam, with the traffic increasing in the more open areas surrounding the Logan Martin Dam.
