= Gainesville Lake (Alabama) =

Reservoir in western Alabama, U.S.

- Location within Alabama Location within the United States
- Location: Pickens County, Alabama, United States
- Coordinates: 33°03′50″N 088°11′35″W
- Primary inflows: Tennessee-Tombigbee Waterway
- Primary outflows: Tennessee-Tombigbee Waterway
- Basin countries: United States

Gainesville Lake is a reservoir in northwest Alabama on the Tennessee-Tombigbee Waterway. Close to Gainesville, it is impounded by the Howell Heflin Lock and Dam.

== See also ==
- List of Alabama dams and reservoirs
