= Chikasanoxee Creek =

Stream in Chambers and Randolph County, Alabama, U.S.

Chikasanoxee Creek is a stream in Chambers and Randolph counties, Alabama. It is a tributary of the Tallapoosa River. The stream begins in extreme southern Randolph County just south of Roanoke, Al. The stream meanders roughly 16 miles through northern Chambers County. The creek flows just to the northwest of Five Points, AL then through the following communities of Mt. Hickory, Milltown and Levertt's Mills. The creek eventually empties into the Tallapoosa River in northwestern Chambers Co. near Muleshoe Bend.

Chikasanoxee is a name likely derived from the Muscogee language meaning "cane ridge".

== Features ==
Point	Coordinates (links to map & photo sources)
Five Points (source of creek)	33.1240097°N 85.3682816°W
Milltown	33.0528998°N 85.4996742°W
Wadley South (mouth of creek)	33.0503996°N 85.5543980°W
