= Aliceville Lake =

- Location within Alabama
- Location: Pickens County, Alabama / Noxubee and Lowndes counties, Mississippi, US
- Coordinates: 33°14′20″N 088°17′05″W
- Type: reservoir
- Primary inflows: Tennessee-Tombigbee Waterway
- Primary outflows: Tennessee-Tombigbee Waterway
- Basin countries: United States
- Max. depth: 42 ft (13 m)
- Surface elevation: 138 ft (42 m)

Aliceville Lake is a reservoir in western Alabama and eastern Mississippi, on the Tennessee-Tombigbee Waterway. Close to Aliceville, it is impounded by the Tom Bevill Lock and Dam.

== See also ==
- List of Alabama dams and reservoirs
