= Cedar Creek Reservoir (Alabama) =

- Location within Alabama Location within the United States
- Location: Franklin County, Alabama
- Coordinates: 34.52890°N 87.92667°W
- Type: reservoir
- Primary inflows: Cedar Creek
- Primary outflows: Cedar Creek
- Basin countries: United States

Cedar Creek Reservoir is a large reservoir located in Franklin County, Alabama (USA) along Cedar Creek.

Cedar Creek Dam is 96 feet (29 m) high earthen dam for flood control and irrigation, completed in 1979 as a project of the Tennessee Valley Authority. No hydroelectric power is generated here.

The "cedar" in the name refers to the eastern juniper (Juniperus virginiana), mistaken by early European settlers for the Lebanon Cedar (Cedrus libani) mentioned in the Bible.

== See also ==
- List of Alabama dams and reservoirs
