= Big Creek Lake =

J.B. Converse Reservoir
- Location within Alabama Location within the United States
- Location: Mobile County, Alabama, United States
- Coordinates: 30°42′44″N 88°20′24″W
- Type: reservoir
- Primary inflows: Big Creek
- Primary outflows: Big Creek
- Basin countries: United States
- Surface area: 3,600 acres (15 km^{2})
- Settlements: Mobile, Semmes, Wilmer

J.B. Converse Reservoir (or Converse Reservoir) is a municipal reservoir which serves as the main source of drinking water for the city of Mobile, Alabama, the city of Prichard, Chickasaw, and parts of Spanish Fort. It was formed by the damming of Big Creek, a tributary of the Escatawpa River in southwest Alabama. The reservoir was the subject of controversy in the 1980s over freshwater rights between Alabama and Mississippi.

== Geography ==
The reservoir is 3,600 acres (15 km^{2}) in surface area. The reservoir's watershed covers 103 square miles (270 km^{2}) and lies totally within Mobile County.

== History ==
From 1907 to 1940, the city of Mobile kept pace with providing water service for the population growth until the outbreak of World War II when it became increasingly apparent that the existing sources of supply were inadequate and undependable. A new source was necessary not only because of a lack of sufficient quantity but because the water sheds of Clear and Three Mile Creeks were becoming more urbanized and the quality of the supply was endangered. The source of supply recommended by the Mobile Water Works to the City and Planning Commissions was Big Creek, in the western part of Mobile County. The Big Creek project was placed in service in 1952 at about $7,000,000 including land, dams, a pumphouse, a reservoir, and pipelines. Construction required two years.

The Big Creek impoundment was named J. B. Converse Reservoir in 1987, and is often referred to as "Big Creek Lake". The pumping station was named S. Palmer Gaillard Pumping Station.

Water is delivered from the 3,600-acre (15 km^{2}) lake and pumping station by pipes to two reservoirs where it is diverted either to domestic or industrial use. The reservoirs are at an elevation of 220 ft (67 m) and industrial water is delivered by gravity to the industry at an elevation of about 25 ft (8 m). The industrial water line extends from the filter plant northward about 7 mi (11 km) to the industrial sites at Magazine Point. Pumps at Big Creek Lake provide treated water to Mobile and untreated water to local industries such as chemical plants and paper mills.

Map of Big Creek Lake

== Controversy ==
The Big Creek tributary, like the Escatawpa, originates in Alabama and flows into Mississippi, joining the Escatawpa about nine miles (14 km) northeast of Robertson Lake. Big Creek Lake was a source of controversy regarding the equitable apportionment of limited fresh water resources between the states of Mississippi and Alabama in the early eighties. The City of Mobile utilizes waters from Big Creek Lake for their municipal drinking water supply, decreasing available flow for downstream uses in Mississippi.

== See also ==
- List of lakes in Alabama
- List of rivers in Alabama
- Mobile County, Alabama
