= R.L. Harris Dam =

Coordinates: 33°15′30″N 85°36′55″W

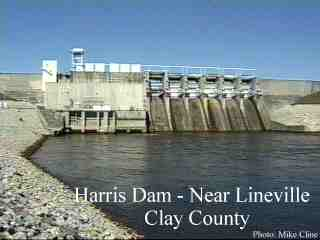
- R. L. Harris Dam
- Country: United States
- Location: Randolph County, Alabama
- Purpose: Power
- Opening date: 1983

Reservoir
- Total capacity: 426,000 acre⋅ft (0.525 km^{3})
- Surface area: 10,600 acres (43 km^{2})

Power Station
- Installed capacity: 135 MW

R. L. Harris Dam is a hydroelectric dam in Randolph County, Alabama, the fourth of four such dams on the Tallapoosa River.

R. L. Harris Lake, also known as Lake Wedowee, was impounded April 20, 1983 and named for Rother L. "Judge" Harris, an Alabama Power director and vice president of electric operations. The lake covers 10,600 acres (43 km^{2}) with 271 miles (436 km) of shoreline and a maximum capacity of 426,000 acre-feet (0.525 km^{3}). The nearest town is Wedowee, Alabama.

The Harris hydropower facility has two generation units with a combined 135-megawatt generating capacity. It is an excellent recreational lake with fishing opportunities for largemouth bass, spotted bass, bluegill and other sunfish, crappie, catfish, striped bass, hybrid and white bass. Alabama Power maintains six public access sites on the lake.
