= A. I. Selden Dam =

- Interactive map of A. I. Selden Dam
- Country: United States
- Location: Hale County, Alabama
- Coordinates: 32°46′45″N 87°50′27″W
- Opening date: 1958

Dam and spillways
- Type of dam: Concrete gravity dam
- Impounds: Black Warrior River
- Height: 71 ft (22 m)
- Length: 684 ft (208 m)

Reservoir
- Creates: Warrior Lake
- Total capacity: 58,650 acre⋅ft (72,340,000 m^{3})
- Surface area: 12.2 mi^{2} (32 km^{2})
- Maximum length: 77 mi (124 km)

A. I. Selden Dam is a dam in Hale County, Alabama. The concrete gravity dam was constructed in 1958 by the United States Army Corps of Engineers with a height of 71 feet (22 m) and 684 feet (208 m) long at its crest. It impounds the Black Warrior River for navigation and flood control. Named for the U.S. representative from Alabama, Armistead I. Selden, Jr., the dam is owned and operated by the Corps of Engineers.

The riverine reservoir it creates, Warrior Lake, has a water surface of 12.2 square miles, a length of 77 miles, and has a maximum capacity of 58,650 acre-feet. Recreation includes camping, boating, fishing, hunting, and hiking, as well as seven day-use parks maintained by the Corps. Alabama's Hale County Road 38 crosses the river over the dam.
