= Lake Martin =

Reservoir in Alabama, United States

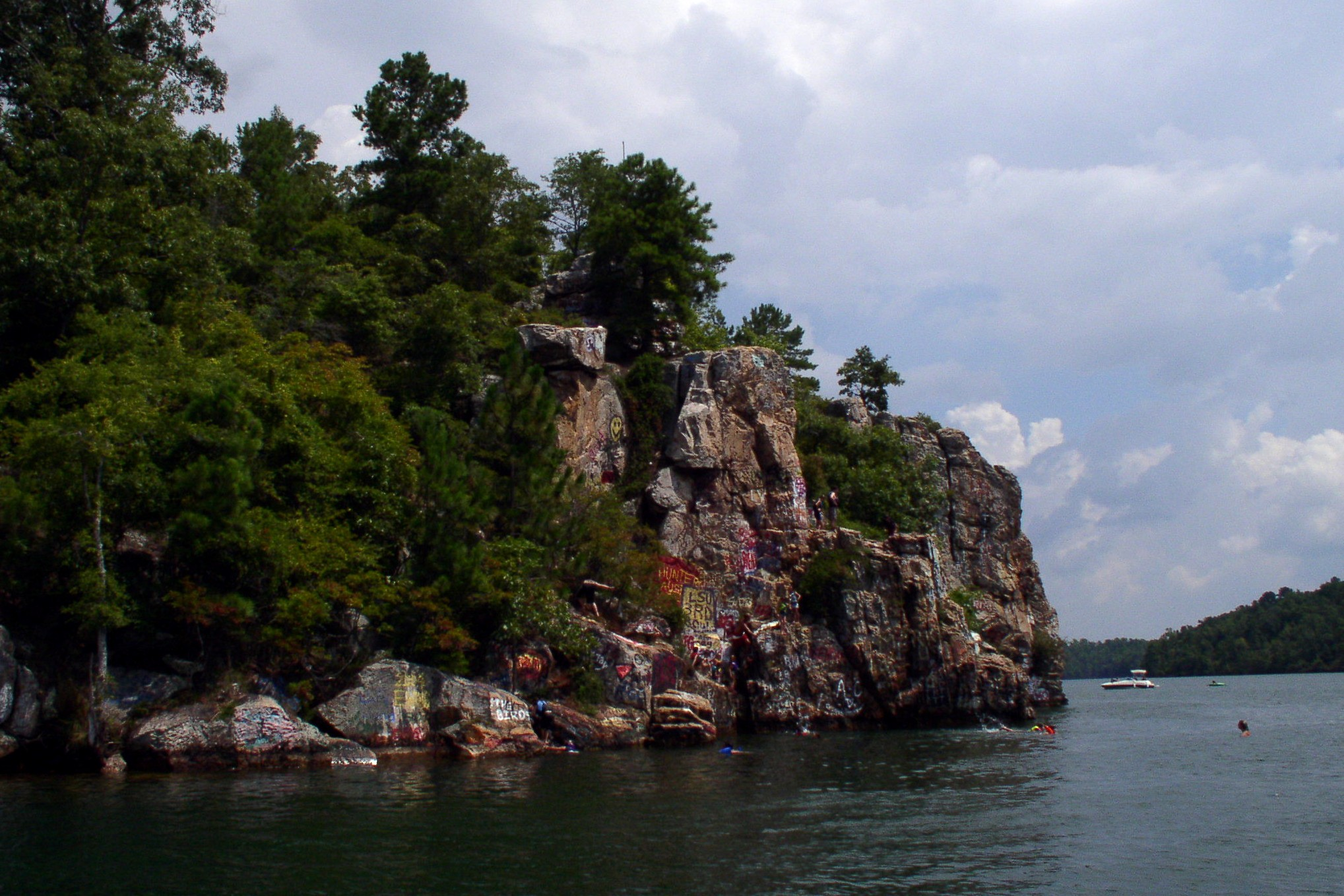
- Acapulco Rock and Chimney Rock at the lake

- Location within Alabama
- Location: Coosa / Elmore / Tallapoosa counties, Alabama, United States
- Coordinates: 32°45′59.37″N 85°54′3.85″W
- Type: Reservoir
- Primary inflows: Tallapoosa River
- Primary outflows: Tallapoosa River
- Basin countries: United States
- Max. length: 31 mi (50 km)
- Surface area: 44,000 acres (18,000 ha)
- Average depth: 41 ft (12 m)
- Max. depth: 155 ft (47 m)
- Shore length^{1}: 743 mi (1,196 km)
- Settlements: Alexander City, Jackson's Gap, Dadeville
- ^{1} Shore length is not a well-defined measure.

Martin Dam
- Interactive map of Martin Dam

History
- Founded: 1923

Alabama Register of Landmarks and Heritage
- Official name: Martin Dam
- Designated: January 5, 1976

Lake Martin is located in Tallapoosa, Elmore and Coosa counties in Alabama. It is a 44,000-acre (178 km^{2}) reservoir with over 750 miles (1,200 km) of wooded shoreline. Lake Martin is a reservoir, enlarged by the construction of Martin Dam on the Tallapoosa River. The Martin Dam powerhouse is used to generate hydroelectric power for the Alabama Power Company. Construction on Martin Dam began in 1923 and was completed in 1926, creating what was, at that time, the largest human-made body of water in the world. Originally known as Cherokee Bluffs for the geological formation upon which it was built, the dam was renamed in 1936 in honor of Thomas Martin, the then-president of Alabama Power Company. Alabama Power and Russell Lands own some of the shoreline. Lake Martin covers the submerged remnants of Kowaliga (or Kowaliga), a prosperous, early 20th-century Black community founded by formerly enslaved people. Developed largely by John Benson and his son William, the area featured a thriving industrial center, a railroad, and a school, which were flooded in 1926 for the Alabama Power Company’s Martin Dam project.

== Tourism ==
The third largest lake in Alabama, Lake Martin, is a popular recreation area for swimming, boating, water skiing, camping, and golfing. Many waterfront neighborhoods and luxury homes are located on Lake Martin. The cities of Alexander City, Dadeville, Jackson's Gap, and Eclectic are nearby.

Lake Martin hosts many events throughout the year, including fishing tournaments, a 4 July fireworks event, and entertainment at the Route 63 Lake Martin Amphitheater.

Lake Martin includes many popular attractions, including eagle nests, sand beaches, restaurants, camping areas and popular islands such as Goat Island. The lake has several landmarks, such as the Smith Mountain Fire Tower, Kowaliga Bridge, and several marinas, but perhaps the most recognized landmark on the lake is Chimney Rock, a large rock formation that resembles a chimney. Although Chimney Rock is located several hundred yards away, the formation most people call Chimney Rock is actually Acapulco Rock. The area was the Tallapoosa River gorge before Martin Dam was built, and the water is more than 150 feet (46 m) deep. The spot is visited by thousands of boaters yearly, who park in front of "The Rock" to watch people climb up 60 feet (18 m) and jump off into the water. In July 2006, a teenager died after jumping from the rock.

Alabama has a lake of a similar name, the Logan Martin Lake on the Coosa River. Lake Martin and Logan Martin Lake are not part of the same river system.

== Islands on Lake Martin ==
Small islands are popular spots on Lake Martin:

- Cemetery Island - A small county graveyard from before the construction of Martin Dam is located on what is now a tiny island in Lake Martin. About 30 by 30 yards (27 m) around, it is in the Bay Pine area.
- Chimney Rock Island - Chimney Rock Island has long been a famous landmark on Lake Martin. Its name came from a tall rock resembling a chimney that protrudes from the top of the island.
- Acapulco Rock Island - Acapulco Rock Island is adjacent to Chimney Rock Island at the Tallapoosa River Gorge. It is often mistaken for Chimney Rock.
- Deer Island - A small island located less than half a mile northwest of Kowaliga Marina. At low water levels, it is connected to the mainland by a land bridge. Deer often cross to the island during the winter when the water levels are lowest and become trapped when the water level rises. Its shore has wide banks of fine-grain sand and thus many residents dock boats on the islands.
- Doctor's Island - So named because a group of doctors used the island as a fishing base camp.
- Goat Island - Goat Island is north of Martin Dam. It has become the residence for a family of goats.
- Real Island - Not an island or distinct community, residents named it for "Real Island Road," which runs through it, and a nearby marina.
- Sand Island - Sand Island is a small island located between Willow Point and Kowaliga Marina. Over the years, erosion has taken its toll on the island, but rocks have recently been placed around the island to prevent it from being completely washed away. Boats frequently park on its sandy, shallow beach. It is likely the smallest island on the lake.
- Young's Island - The Young residence (of Young's ferry) was here and was destroyed by fire in the early 1990s. The foundation remains, and there are historic markers for the graves of the family's children.
- Weed Hill Island - Weed Hill is a small island almost directly across from the Pleasure Point Marina boat ramp. Although at one time it was much larger, erosion has reduced the landmass.
- Wood's Island - Wood's Island is a larger island, connected to the mainland by a land bridge during low water times. It has several trails for hiking. It can be found at the end of Young's Ferry Rd on the West side of the lake.
- Wilmarth's Island- only inhabited island on the lake.

== Tornadoes ==
On April 27, 2011, an EF4 tornado ripped across Lake Martin. Several valuable houses and businesses were destroyed along its path. Some vehicles were carried over 100 yards. The tornado resulted in seven deaths across the region. Its path through Elmore, Tallapoosa, and Chambers counties was 44.2 miles (71.1 km) long.

Another tornado went through the northern side of the lake on January 12, 2023. The tornado was rated EF3; however, the maximum damage near the lake was rated EF2.

== See also ==
- List of Alabama dams and reservoirs
- 2011 Lake Martin tornado
