= Bear Creek Reservoir =

- Location within Alabama Location within the United States
- Location: Franklin County, Alabama
- Coordinates: 34°23′55″N 87°59′16″W
- Type: reservoir
- Primary inflows: Bear Creek
- Primary outflows: Bear Creek
- Basin countries: United States
- Water volume: 37,800 acre-feet (47,000 cubic dekameters)

The Bear Creek Reservoir is a reservoir located in Franklin County, Alabama, along Bear Creek. Bear Creek Dam is one of four Tennessee Valley Authority dams in the area, 68 feet (21 m) high, creating a maximum flood control capacity of 37,800 acre-feet (47,000 cubic dekameters). No hydroelectric power is generated here.

== See also ==
- List of dams and reservoirs in the United States
- List of lakes
- List of Alabama dams and reservoirs
