= Wilson Dam =

Dam on the Tennessee River, Alabama

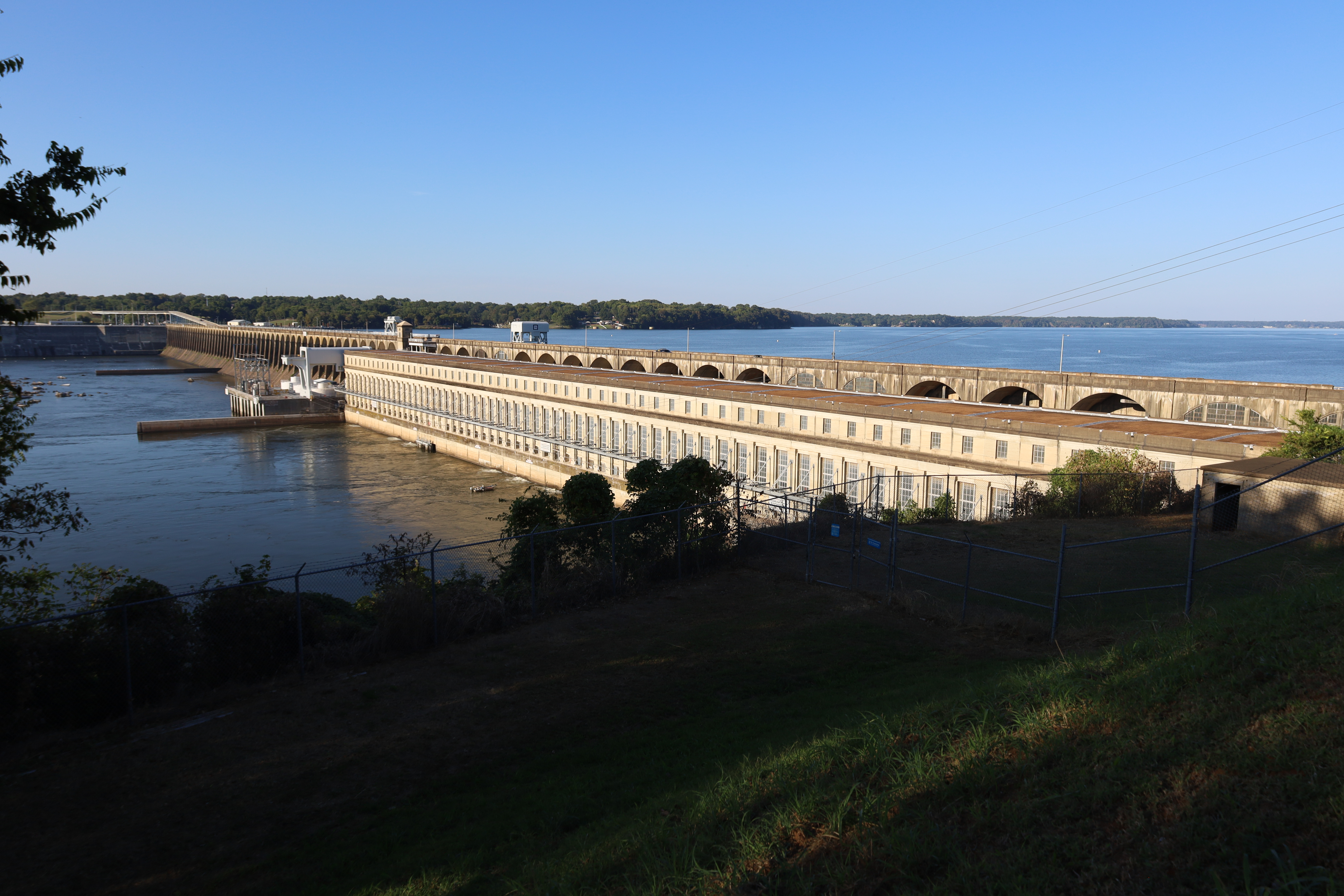
- The dam from the south in 2025
- Interactive map of Wilson Dam
- Location: Shoals Area, Alabama, U.S.
- Coordinates: 34°48′03″N 87°37′33″W
- Construction began: 1918
- Opening date: 1925
- Construction cost: $47,000,000 (equivalent to $680 million in 2024)
- Operator: TVA

Dam and spillways
- Impounds: Tennessee River
- Height: 137 ft (42 m)
- Length: 4,541 ft (1,384 m)

Reservoir
- Creates: Wilson Lake
- Total capacity: 640,200 acre⋅ft (789,700,000 m^{3})
- Surface area: 15,500 acres (6,300 ha)
- Wilson Dam
- U.S. National Register of Historic Places
- U.S. National Historic Landmark
- Location within Alabama Location within the United States
- Nearest city: Florence, Alabama
- Coordinates: 34°48′3″N 87°37′33″W
- Area: 20 acres (8.1 ha)
- Built: 1925
- Architect: Army Corps of Engineers
- NRHP reference No.: 66000147

Significant dates
- Added to NRHP: November 13, 1966
- Designated NHL: November 13, 1966

Wilson Dam is a dam on the Tennessee River in Lauderdale and Colbert counties of Alabama, United States. Completed in 1924 by the United States Army Corps of Engineers, it impounds Wilson Lake, and is one of nine Tennessee Valley Authority (TVA) dams on the Tennessee River. It was declared a National Historic Landmark on November 13, 1966, for its role as the first dam to come under the TVA's administration. The dam is named for President Woodrow Wilson.

== Description ==
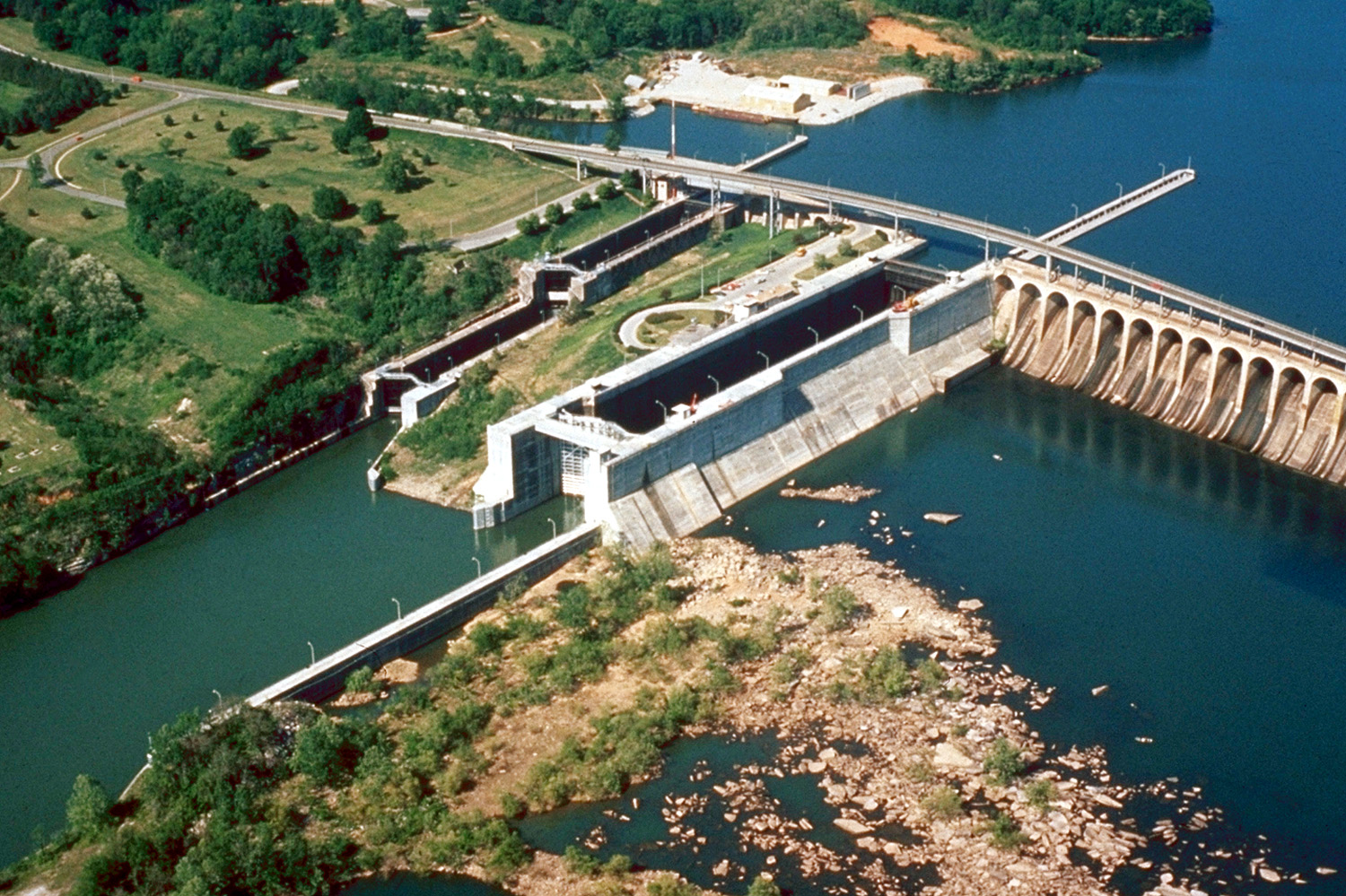
Aerial view of the locks

Wilson Dam is located at river mile 259.4 of the Tennessee River, spanning the river in a roughly north–south orientation between Florence and Muscle Shoals in northern Alabama. The dam is 137 feet (42 m) high and 4,541 feet (1,384 m) long. The dam cost almost $47 million (equivalent to $680 million in 2024). The main lock at Wilson Dam is 110 feet (34 m) wide by 600 feet (180 m) long. The lock lift is 94 feet (29 m). It is the highest single lift lock east of the Rocky Mountains. An auxiliary lock has two 60 feet (18 m) wide by 300 feet (91 m) long chambers that operate in tandem. Over 3,700 vessels pass through Wilson Dam's locks each year.

The net dependable capacity of Wilson Dam is 663 megawatts of electricity.

Wilson Dam is one of 29 conventional hydroelectric dams that provide flood control, navigation, electrical power, recreation, and water supply for the seven-state Tennessee Valley region and is the largest conventional facility in the TVA System. Over 3,600 vessels pass through the locks each year and the dam currently serves as the training facility for all of TVA's hydroelectric workers. Wilson Lake provides 166 miles (267 km) of shoreline and 15,500 acres (6,300 ha) of water surface for recreational activities, and the adjoining reservation provides miles of hiking trails and campground.

== History ==
=== Planning and construction ===
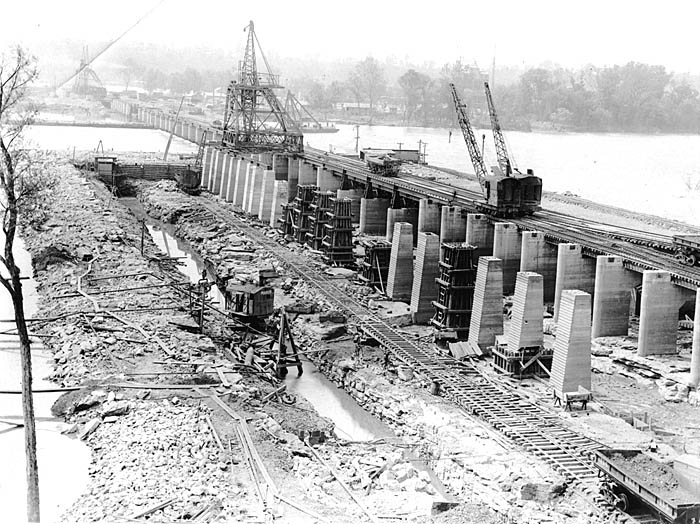
Construction of Wilson Dam under way around 1919. Jackson Island, seen in the background, is now covered by Lake Wilson.

The origins of the dam lie in the treacherous Muscle Shoals section of the Tennessee River, an area of dangerous shallows and turbulent currents, impeding commerce and navigation. The expansion of steamboat travel and plantation agriculture along the Tennessee Valley inspired many largely unsuccessful efforts in the late 19th century to tame the shoals, including a canal around the area. This final effort to tame the Muscle Shoals was spurred on by the possibility of US entry into the First World War. US Officials feared that the German Navy could disrupt the supply of nitrates, used in the manufacturing of explosives, which were primarily imported in the form of bat or bird guano from Chile. The National Defense Act of 1916 mandated the construction of two nitrate plants, powered by an adjacent hydroelectric plant in order to create a domestic supply of this vital resource. Federal Engineers decided on Muscle Shoals after determining that it had the greatest hydroelectric potential east of the Rocky Mountains.

Construction of Wilson Dam by the Army Corps of Engineers began in 1918 under the supervision of Hugh L. Cooper and was the largest hydroelectric installation in the world at the time of construction. During construction, the site briefly became a city in its own right, employing over 18,000 workers and consisting of over 1,700 temporary buildings, 236 permanent buildings, 185 residential units, 165 miles of sewage pipeline, and 685 miles of electrical cabling. The settlement's mess halls served over 20,000 meals a day, and it also contained a school with capacity for 850 students, three barbershops, and a hospital. However the dam was not finished by the war's end in 1919 and did not contribute to its outcome.

With peace, interest in the dam rapidly declined, and Congress was unwilling to front costs for more public works projects, yet wasting the millions of dollars in costs to that point was similarly anathema. The Secretary of War, John Weeks sought private sector investment in order to complete the project in the post-war political climate. In 1921, Henry Ford offered to take on a 99-year lease on the dam for 5 million dollars, in which he promised to finish the dam and construct a new one upstream. Ford promised to use the dam and create a planned city in the yet-nonexistent Muscle Shoals which he would make the "Detroit of the South." The dam would be used to fuel industrial development in his new planned city, and gathered widespread support among the populace and in the House of Representatives. However, Senator George Norris believed that the dam would do more good in public hands than under Ford's ownership, and should be used as part of a large scale public works program and development scheme across the Tennessee Valley. Norris' plan would address three major concerns affecting the Tennessee Valley, persistent flooding, soil erosion, and lack of electrical power. Norris blocked the Ford proposal in the Senate, and Ford ultimately withdrew his bid in 1924, citing the delays.

=== Operation ===
Construction on the dam itself was finally finished in 1924, with the first electricity generating unit going into service in September 1925. The finished dam and locks finally allowed free navigation of the Muscle Shoals for steamboats and barges. Over the next few years only 40 percent of electric generating capacity was installed. The debate over what the dam should be used for raged throughout the 1920s, with Norris' Muscle Shoals Bill being vetoed by President Herbert Hoover in 1931 as "socialistic." This all changed with the advent of the Great Depression and the election of Franklin Delano Roosevelt in 1932. After his election, President-elect Roosevelt inspected the dam and threw his support behind Norris' public works plan, and in 1933, the Tennessee Valley Authority was created, with Wilson Dam as one of the cornerstones in the new agency's plans.

TVA and Wilson Dam brought power to thousands in the Lauderdale and Colbert County areas as part of the TVA's overall plan of rural electrification and, in the words of one economist, gave residents "universally high standards of living, new jobs, leisure, freedom and an end to drudgery, congestion, noise, smoke and filth." Wilson Dam also served as TVA's first headquarters, until it was gradually moved to Knoxville, Tennessee, where it is still based. The nitrate plants that Wilson Dam was initially constructed to power were used for the production of fertilizer throughout the 1930s, and by the Second World War Wilson Dam Was finally used for its initial purpose, as the nitrate and phosphorus plants in the area were used to produce munitions for the war effort. These plants continued to serve throughout the Cold War, supplying a major portion of the phosphorus used in munitions by the United States Armed Forces.

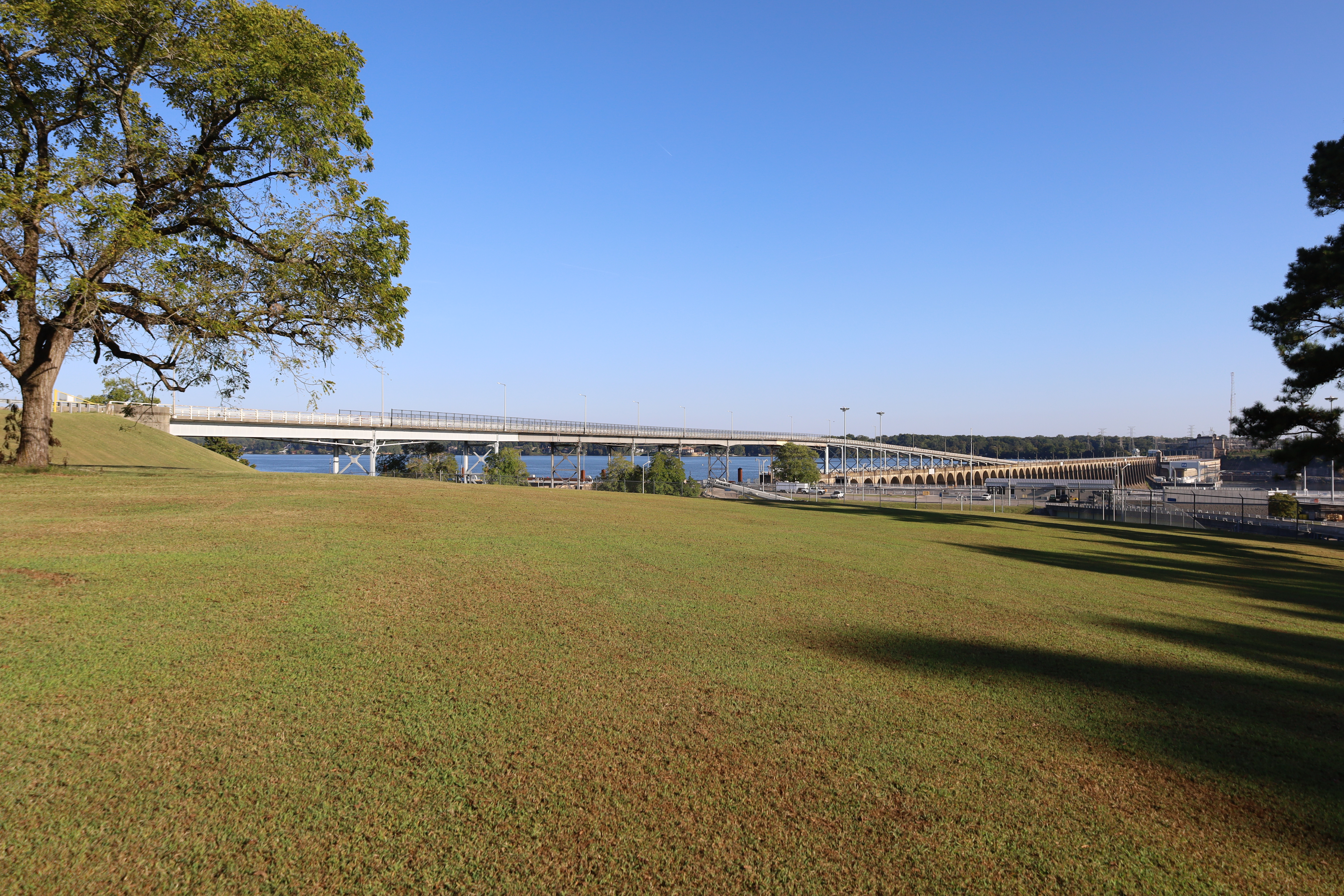
The dam from the north in 2025, showing the roadway bridge above the locks

In 1959, a new lock was constructed for Wilson Dam, which was the largest single-chamber lock in the world at the time of construction. This lock remains today the largest single-chamber lock in the continental United States east of the Rockies. President John Fitzgerald Kennedy visited the dam in 1963 with Alabama Governor George C. Wallace to make remarks on TVA and Wilson Dam's role in the agency's success and the role of the Federal Government in the Valley's history. In 1966, the Department of the Interior designated Wilson Dam a National Historic Landmark and added it to the National Register of Historic Places for its role as the first dam under TVA supervision.

== Gallery ==
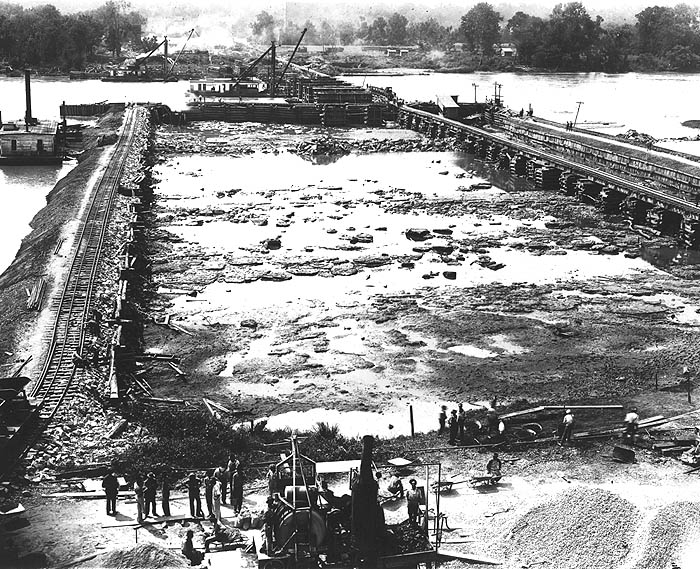
Wilson Dam construction around 1919.

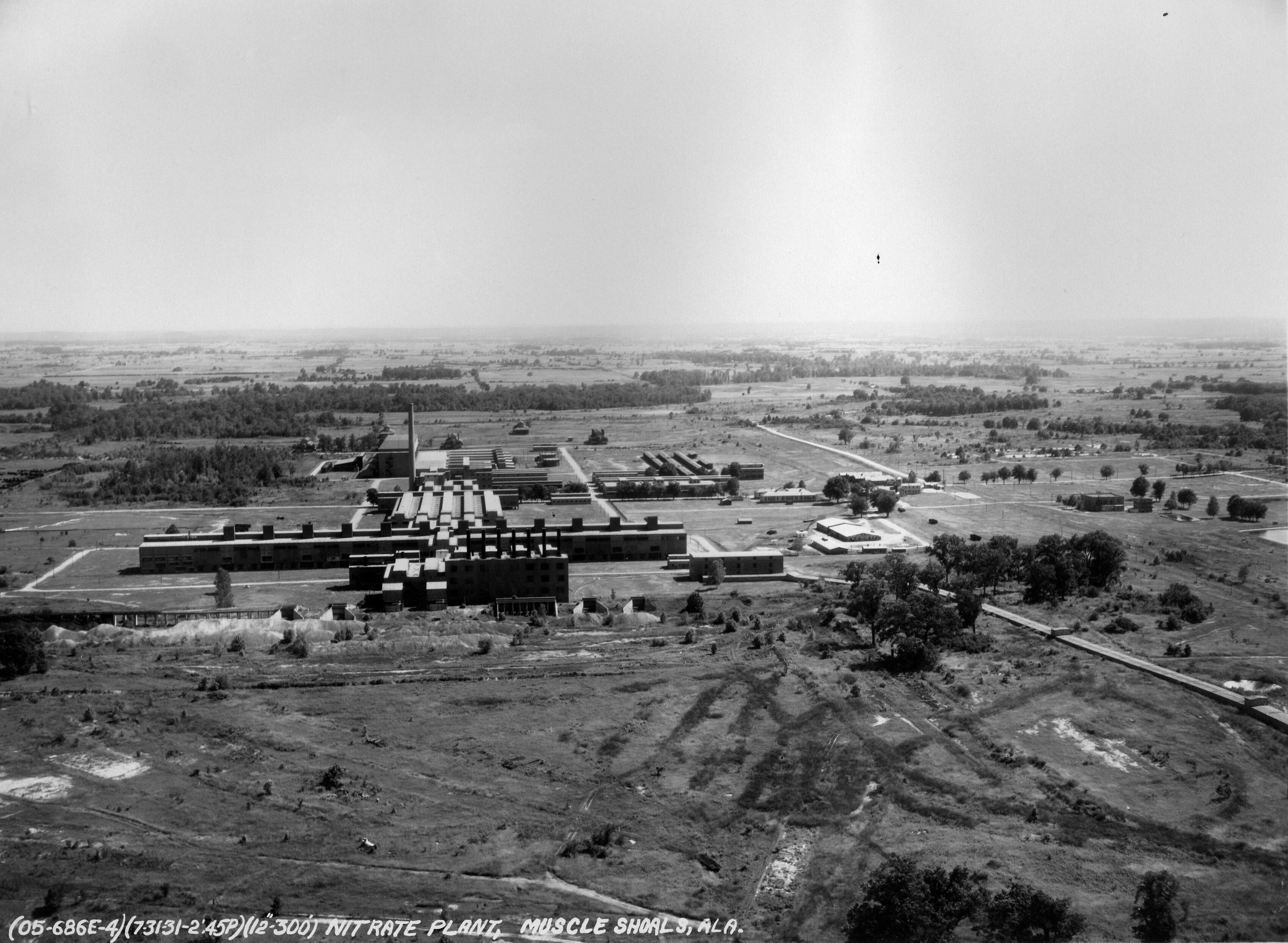
Muscle Shoals Nitrate Plant, powered by the dam, 1931

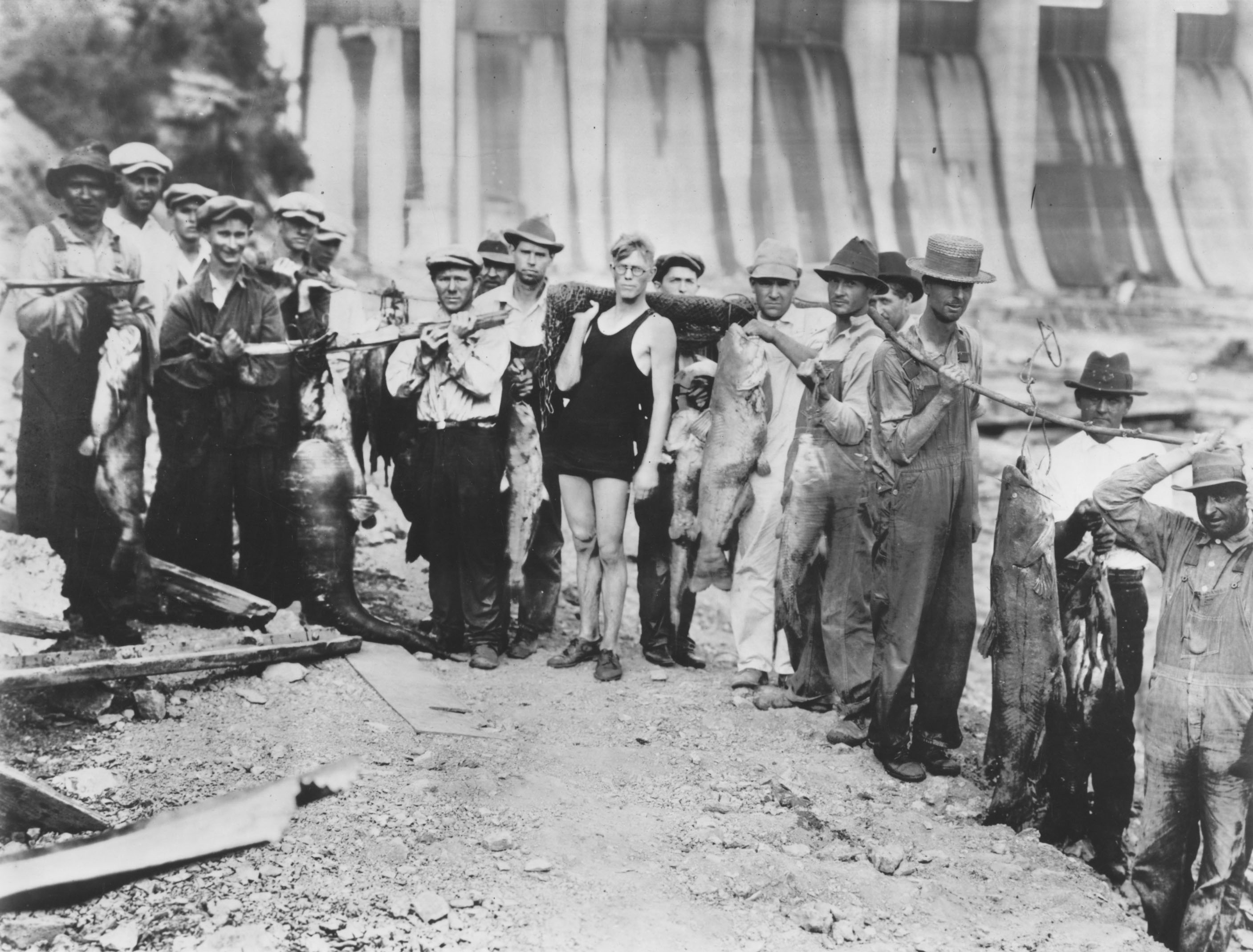
Fish catch downstream of Wilson Dam in 1940.

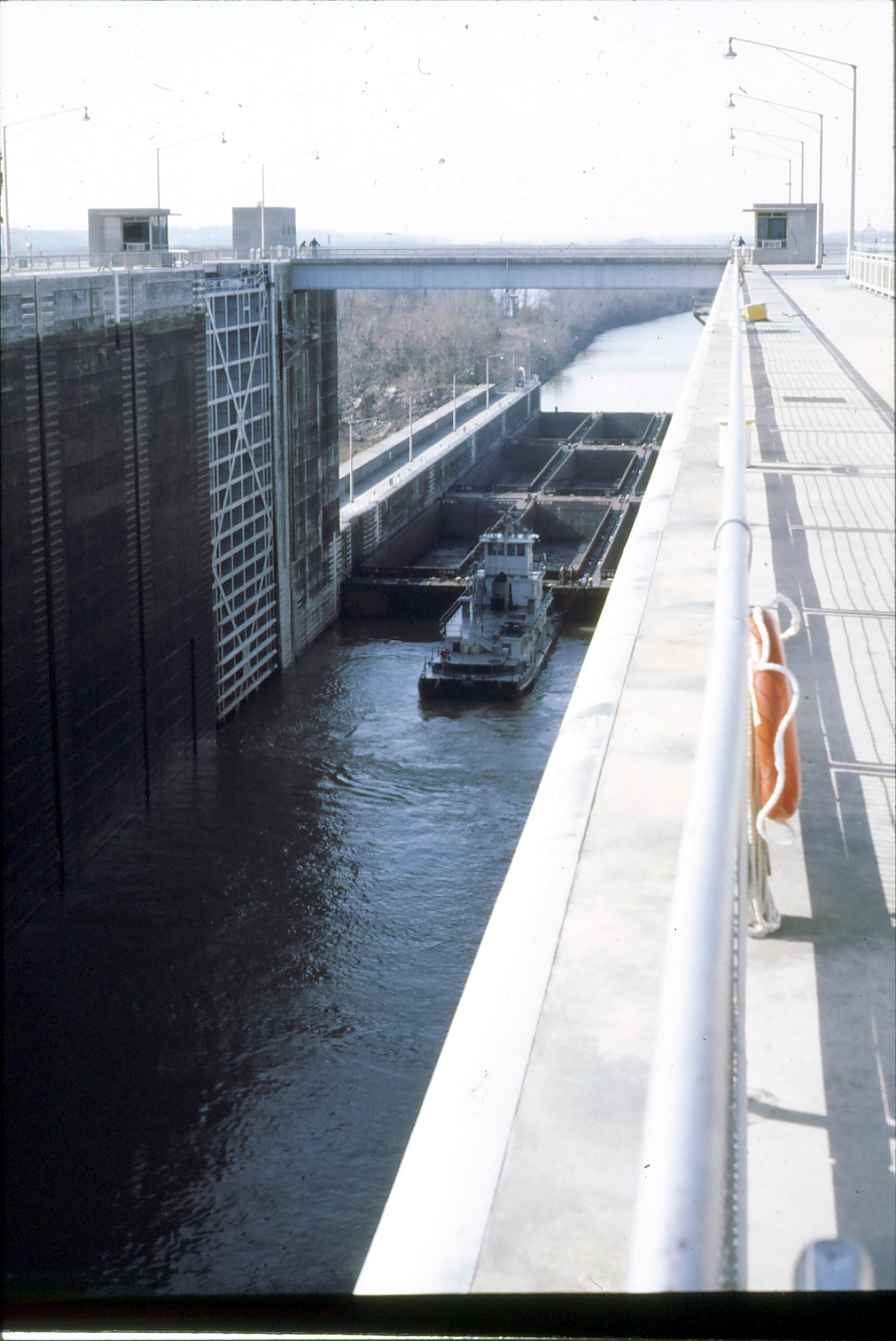
Barge exiting the main lock at Wilson Dam in 1982.

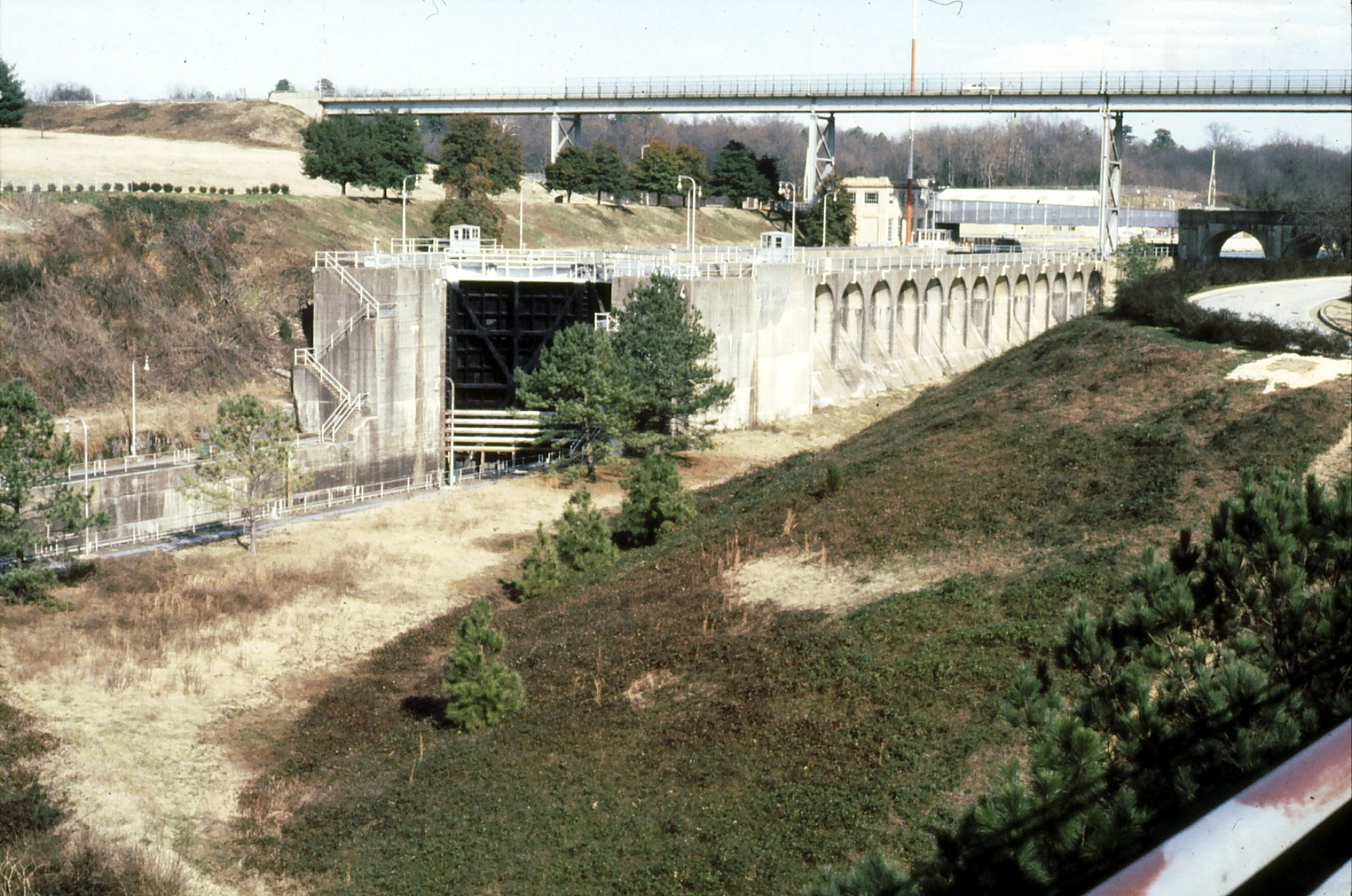
Wilson Dam Auxiliary Locks in 1982.

== See also ==
- Ashwander v. Tennessee Valley Authority: U.S. Supreme Court case over the dam
- Birmingham District
- Dams and reservoirs of the Tennessee River
- List of National Historic Landmarks in Alabama
