= Wilson Lake (Alabama) =

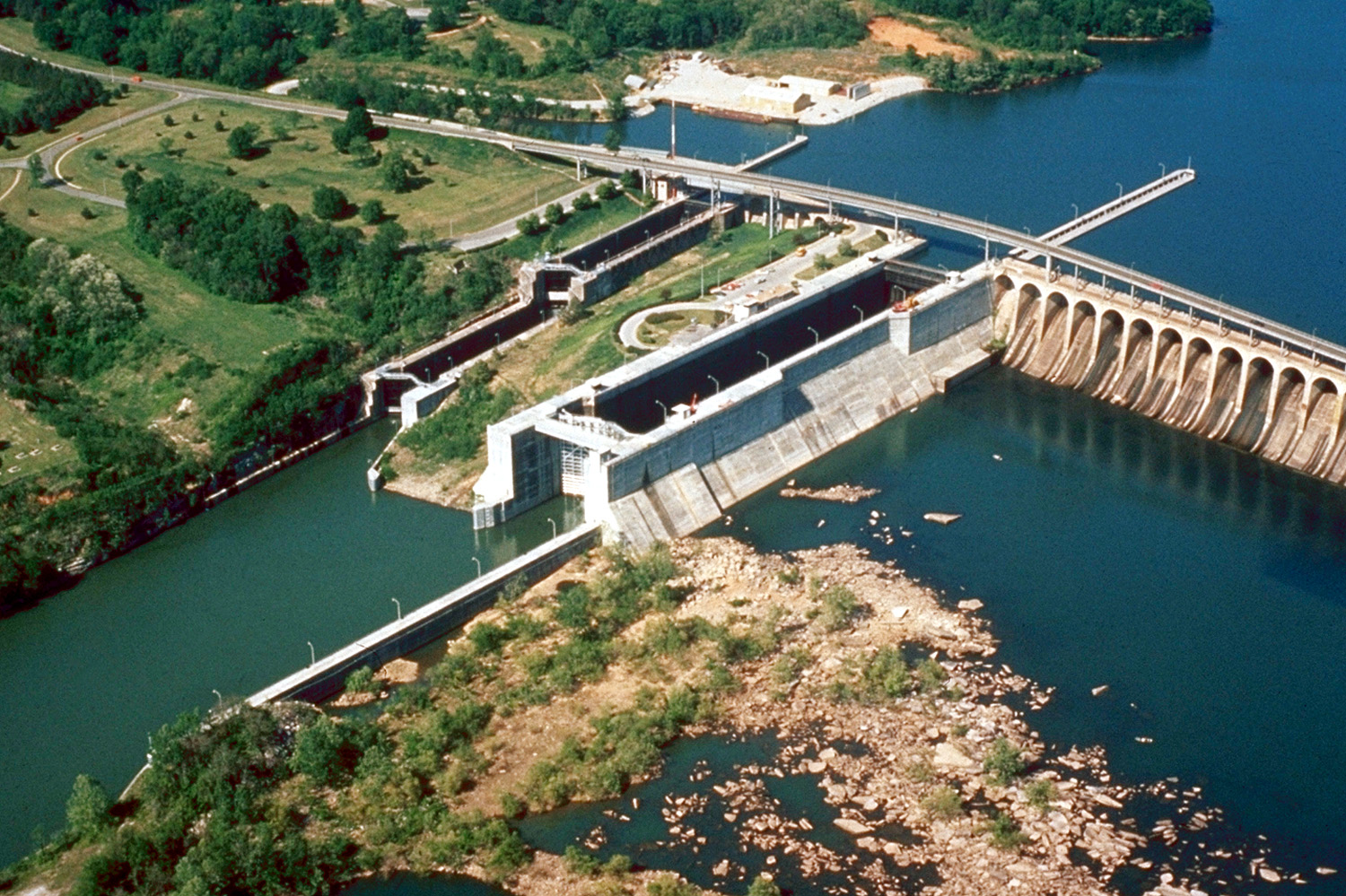
- Wilson Dam

- Location within Alabama
- Location: Colbert / Lauderdale / Lawrence counties, Alabama, United States
- Coordinates: 34.800643°N 87.625861°W
- Type: reservoir
- Primary inflows: Tennessee River
- Primary outflows: Tennessee River
- Basin countries: United States

Wilson Lake is the reservoir created on the Tennessee River by Wilson Dam as part of the Tennessee Valley Authority. The lake stretches from Wilson Dam to Wheeler Dam.

== See also ==
- Dams and reservoirs of the Tennessee River
- List of Alabama dams and reservoirs
