= Bankhead Lake =

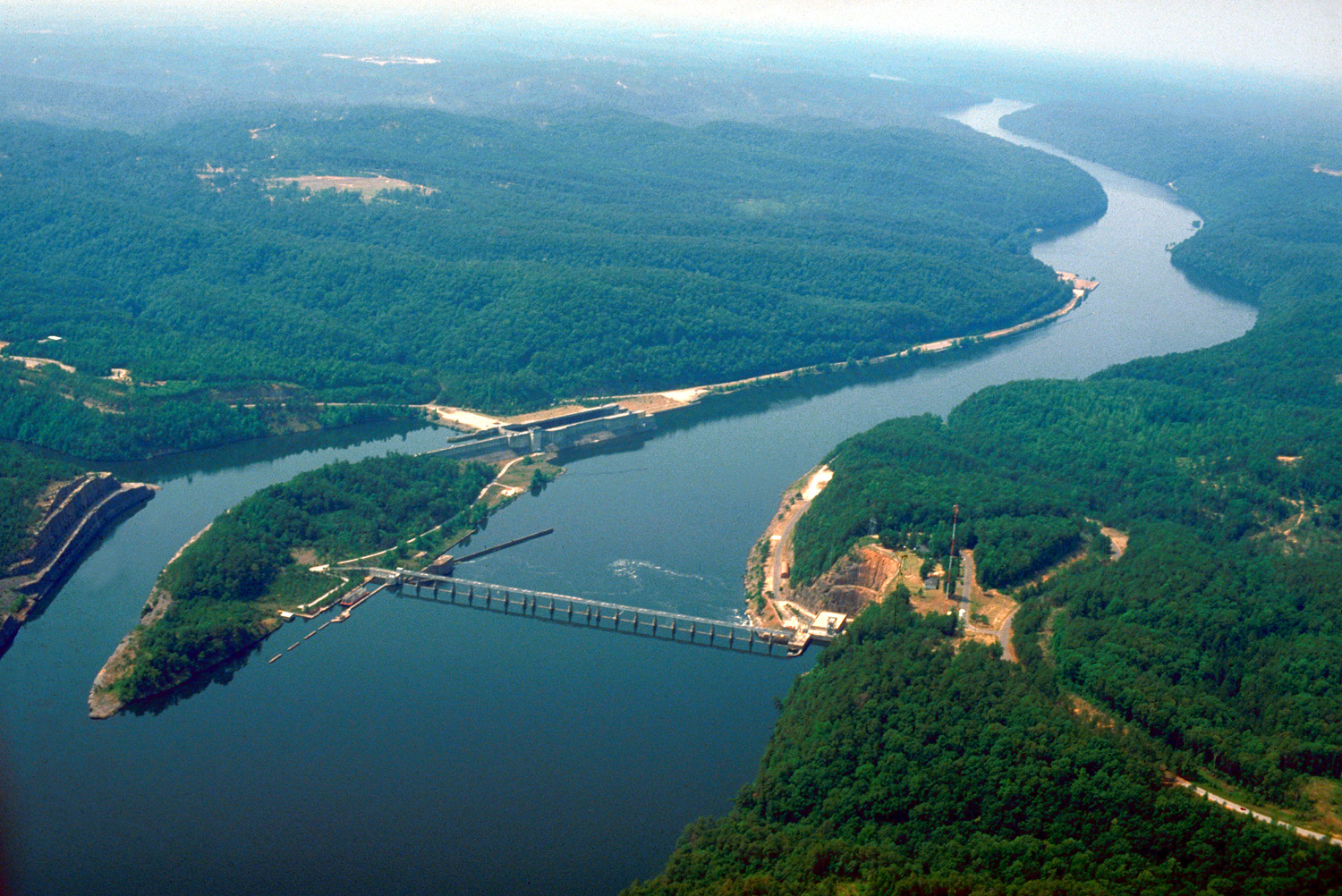
- Bankhead Lock and Dam. Holt Lake is visible directly below the dam (top), while Bankhead Lake is behind the dam (bottom). View is downriver to the west.

- Location within Alabama Location within the United States
- Location: Jefferson / Tuscaloosa / Walker counties, Alabama, US
- Coordinates: 33.461°N 87.353°W
- Type: Reservoir
- Primary inflows: Black Warrior River
- Primary outflows: Holt Lake
- Basin countries: United States

Bankhead Lake is a reservoir along the Black Warrior River that begins in Walker County in the state of Alabama. The lake forms the border between Jefferson and Tuscaloosa County, as well as the border dividing Jefferson and Walker County. It eventually empties into Holt Lake.

Bankhead Lock and Dam and its reservoir is a project of the United States Army Corps of Engineers, while Alabama Power Company owns and operates the adjoining hydroelectric generating plant. Both facilities are named for Alabama Senator John H. Bankhead. The reservoir has a capacity of 296,000 acre-feet (370 million cubic meters), with normal storage of 269,215 acre⋅ft (330 million m^{3}).

The original Bankhead Dam was built in 1915 as the last of an entire navigation system of 17 locks and dams between Mobile and Birmingham. Alabama Power's hydropower facility was installed on the right bank in 1963. As of March 1969, Bankhead was the last of those original 17 still in service, but was deemed by the Corps of Engineers structurally unsafe and at risk of collapse. The current lock, 77 feet high and 1,400 feet long at its crest, was completed in 1975. Some of the original dam structure still exists as part of the complex but is not accessible.

== See also ==
- List of Alabama dams and reservoirs
- List of lakes
- List of dams and reservoirs in the United States
