= Guntersville Lake =

Man-made lake in Alabama, United States

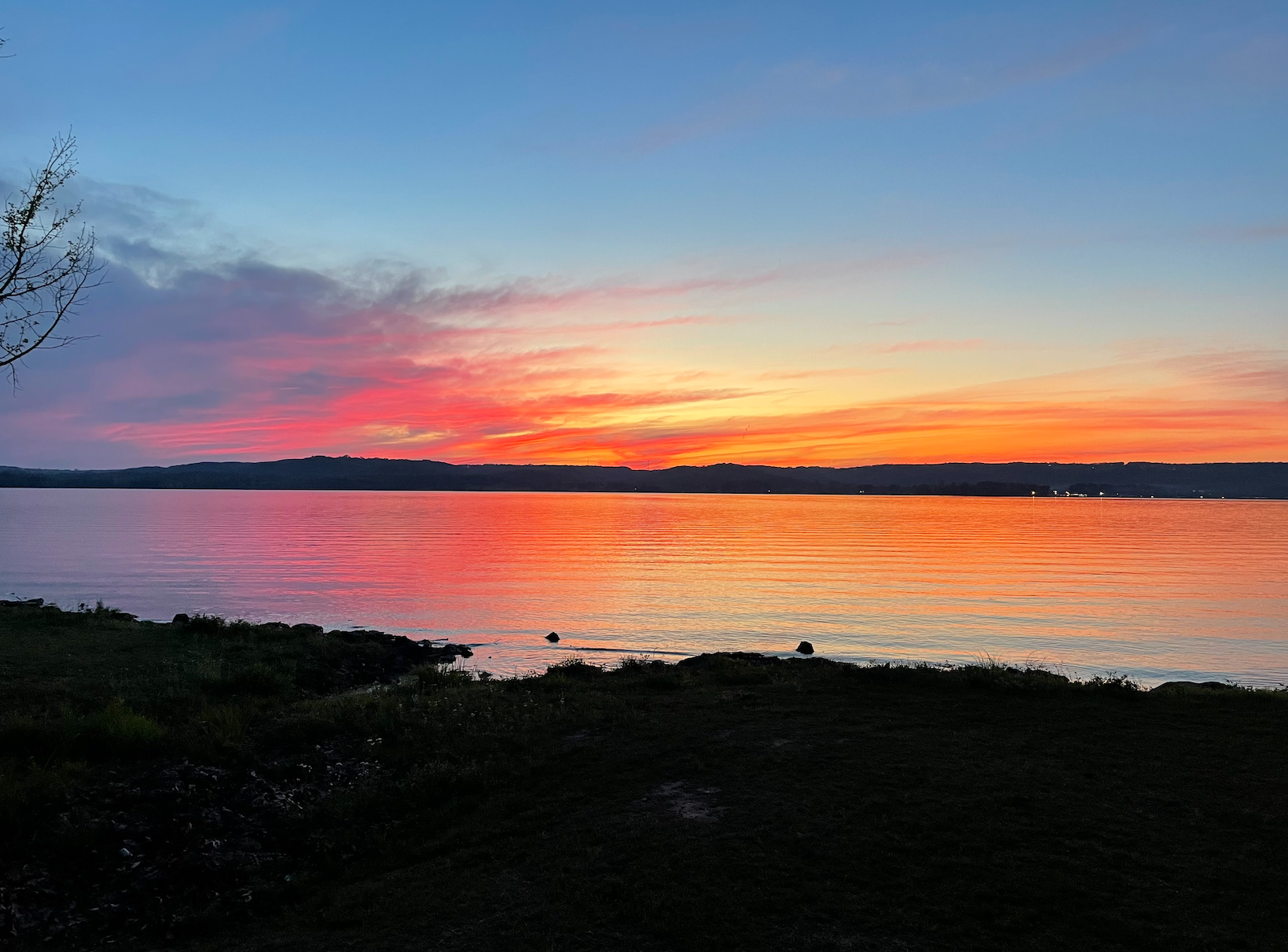
- Guntersville Lake

- Location within Alabama Location within the United States

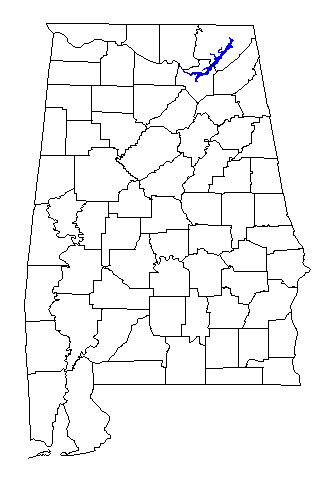
- Location of the lake in Alabama
- Location: Jackson / Marshall counties, Alabama, United States
- Coordinates: 34°25′23″N 086°23′32″W
- Lake type: reservoir
- Primary inflows: Tennessee River
- Primary outflows: Tennessee River
- Basin countries: United States
- Max. length: 75 mi (121 km)
- Surface area: 69,000 acres (28,000 ha)

Guntersville Lake (generally referred to locally as Lake Guntersville) is an artificial lake in northern Alabama between Bridgeport and Guntersville.

== Location ==
The lake stretches 75 miles (121 km) from Guntersville Dam to Nickajack Dam. It is Alabama's largest lake at 69,100 acres (279.6 km^{2}).

It is separated by the Guntersville Dam from Wheeler Lake, which at 68,300 acres (276.4 km^{2}) is Alabama's second largest lake. Both lakes are part of the Tennessee River.

== History ==
The lake was created by Guntersville Dam along the Tennessee River. Both the lake and the dam received their names from the town of Guntersville, which received its name from an early settler of the area, John Gunter.

As far back as 1824, the Tennessee River was a nationwide inland waterway problem. With narrow canals, increased traffic, and larger freight carriers, in addition to flooding problems and sparse electricity, it was clear that a successful river development program should embrace power, navigation and flood control.

The Tennessee Valley Act called for development of 640 miles of Tennessee River from Paducah, Kentucky to Knoxville, Tennessee. Since many of the earliest settlers built their homes along the river, many Guntersville area families and farms were displaced. Alabama's largest archeological project excavated dozens of Indian sites before the area was flooded in January 1939.

As a result of the Tennessee Valley Act and the creation of the lake, Guntersville has seen improved agriculture, energy, industry and recreation. Known for its hiking, camping, fishing, boating activities and scenery, Alabama's Lake City is repeatedly noted as a top spot for bass fishing and one of the top lake towns to live in America.

In the 1950s, German scientists brought to the United States under Operation Paperclip who lived in Huntsville, Alabama purchased houses by the lake.

== See also ==
- Dams and reservoirs of the Tennessee River
- List of Alabama dams and reservoirs
