= Lake Wedowee =

- R. L. Harris Reservoir
- Location within Alabama Location within the United States
- Location: Randolph County, Alabama, United States
- Coordinates: 33°15′02″N 85°36′45″W
- Type: reservoir
- Primary inflows: Tallapoosa River
- Primary outflows: Tallapoosa River
- Basin countries: United States
- Max. length: 24 miles (39 km)
- Surface area: 10,660 acres (43.1 km^{2})
- Max. depth: 135 ft (41 m)
- Shore length^{1}: 367 mi (591 km)
- Surface elevation: 793 ft (242 m)
- ^{1} Shore length is not a well-defined measure.

Lake Wedowee, or R. L. Harris Reservoir, is a reservoir, located in Randolph County, Alabama on the upper part of the Tallapoosa River 90 miles (140 km) from Atlanta, Georgia. The lake has an area of 9,870 acres (39.9 km^{2}). This lake was built at one of the last hydro sites in Alabama.

== Construction ==
The lake was created by the flooding of the plains behind the R.L. Harris Dam, which began construction on November 1, 1974. The dam was completed on April 20, 1983. There are two generating units that produce up to 67,500 kilowatts of power for each unit. The dam measures 1,142 feet (348 m) long and 151.5 feet (46.2 m) high.

== Recreation ==
There are many recreational attractions on Lake Wedowee such as: boating, swimming, fishing and camping. Fishing brings the most attraction to the lake. It is known to be one of the finest lakes in the Southeast because of the water quality. There are many different species of fish in the lake, they include crappie, largemouth bass, spotted bass, hybrid striped bass, bluegill, warmouth, shellcracker, white bass, bowfin, carp, flathead, blue catfish, yellow catfish and channel catfish. During summer, the lake is filled with both residents and visitors.

== Community ==
The town of Wedowee is relatively small with a population of 797 people, as of 2018. Wedowee is also the county seat of Randolph County. U.S. Highway 431 intersects the town as well as Alabama Highway 48. The community has grown over the years as the lake continues to develop.
