= Neely Henry Lake =

Reservoir in Alabama, US

- Location within Alabama Location within the United States
- Location: Calhoun / Etowah / St. Clair counties, Alabama, US
- Coordinates: 33.84°N 86.06°W
- Type: reservoir
- Primary inflows: Coosa River
- Primary outflows: Coosa River
- Basin countries: United States
- Surface area: 11,200 acres (45 km^{2})
- Water volume: 129,800 acre⋅ft (160,100,000 m^{3})
- Shore length^{1}: 339 mi (546 km)
- Surface elevation: 508 ft (155 m)
- Settlements: Gadsden, Southside, Rainbow City
- ^{1} Shore length is not a well-defined measure.

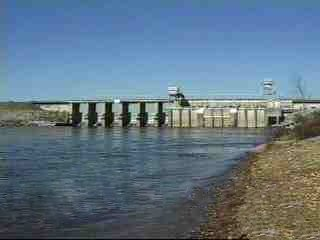
Neely Henry Dam and Powerhouse, Coosa River near Anniston, Alabama, 1996

Neely Henry Lake is located on the Coosa River near Gadsden, Alabama. The lake was formed by the Neely Henry Dam (57 feet (17 m) high), built in 1966 by Alabama Power Company for hydroelectric power and recreation.

Completed on June 2, 1966, the dam and reservoir were named for H. Neely Henry, a senior executive vice-president of Alabama Power. The dam has a 72,900 kilowatt generating capacity; the lake covers 11,200 surface acres (45.3 km^{2}) with a total capacity of 129,800 acre-feet (0.1601 km^{3}) and about 339 miles (546 km) of shoreline. The nearest town is Ohatchee, Alabama to the East of the dam, and Ragland, Alabama to the West. It is an excellent recreational lake with fishing opportunities for largemouth bass, spotted bass, bluegill and other sunfish, crappie, catfish, striped bass, hybrid and white bass. Alabama Power maintains three public access sites on the lake.
