= Tallapoosa River =

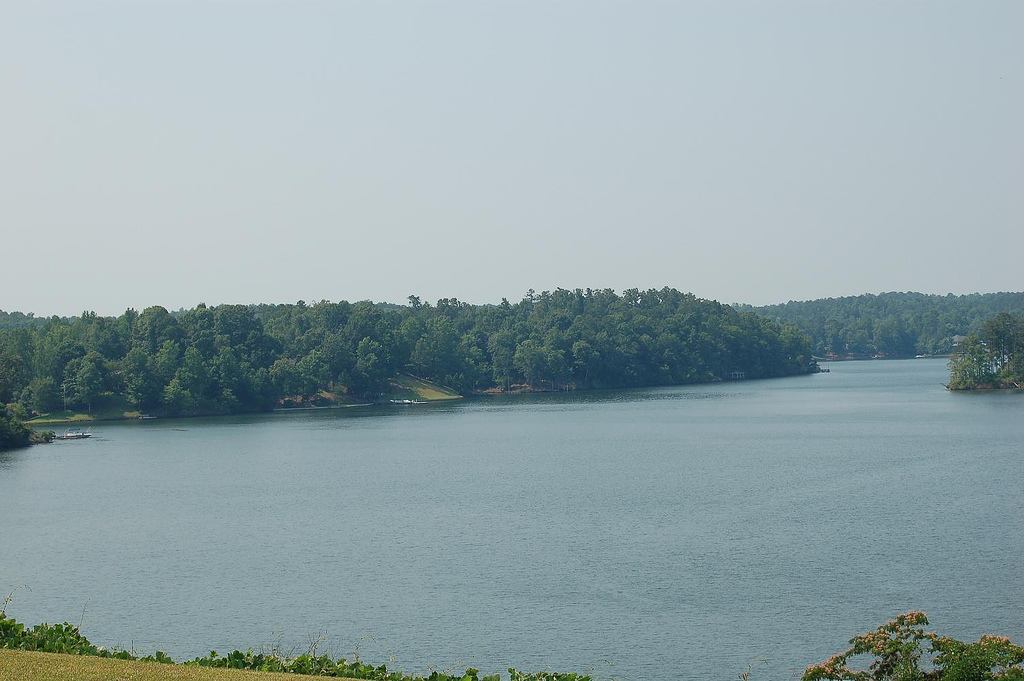

Location
- Country: United States
- States: Alabama, Georgia

Physical characteristics
- Source: Tallapoosa River
  - location: Draketown, Georgia
  - coordinates: 33°50′48″N 85°00′45″W
  - elevation: 1,155 ft (352 m)
- Mouth: Alabama River
  - location: Wetumpka, Alabama
  - coordinates: 32°30′09″N 86°15′48″W
  - elevation: 125 ft (38 m)
- Length: 265 mi (426 km)
- Basin size: 4,700 mi^{2} (12,000 km^{2})

The Tallapoosa River runs 265 miles (426 km) from the southern end of the Appalachian Mountains in Georgia, United States, southward and westward into the Appalachian foothills in Alabama. It is formed by the confluence of McClendon Creek and Mud Creek in Paulding County, Georgia. Lake Martin at Dadeville, Alabama is a large and popular water recreation area formed by a dam on the river. The Tallapoosa joins the Coosa River about 10 miles (16 km) northeast of Montgomery near Wetumpka (in Elmore County) to form the Alabama River.

There are four hydroelectric dams on the Tallapoosa: Yates, Thurlow, Martin and Harris dams. They are important sources of electricity generation for Alabama Power (a unit of the Southern Company) and recreation for the public.

== Description ==
The Tallapoosa River, especially its lower course, was a major population center of the Creek Indians before the early 19th century. The contemporary name of the river is from the Creek words Talwa posa, which mean "Grandmother Town". The Creek consider the Tallapoosa branch of their tribe to be one of the oldest.

Horseshoe Bend National Military Park, a U.S. National Military Park managed by the National Park Service, is located along the banks of the Tallapoosa River just upstream from Lake Martin. It preserves a battle site associated with the Creek War.

The river below Thurlow Dam provides a short run of Class II, III and IV whitewater kayaking.

Tallapoosa, Georgia is named for the river, which runs near the town.

== Impoundments ==
The first hydroelectric dam in Alabama was built on the Tallapoosa River in 1902, by Henry C. Jones, an Auburn University electrical engineer, at the site of the current Yates Dam. It was destroyed in the flood of 1919 but rebuilt. The dam then belonged to the Montgomery Light & Water Power Company. In 1928 it was replaced by the Yates Dam.

There are four hydroelectric dams on the Tallapoosa River: Yates Dam, Thurlow Dam, Martin Dam, and R.L. Harris Dam.

The table below outlines the four impoundments (dams) on the Tallapoosa River from south to north.

Impoundment	Description	Images
Lake Thurlow (Lower Tallasee Dam)	Lake Thurlow was impounded in 1930. Thurlow Dam was built in Tallassee at the site of an early 19th-century textile mill. During the Civil War it was converted to operate as a uniform and ammunition plant. The Benjamin Fitzpatrick Bridge spans the river immediately south of Thurlow Dam.	
Lake Yates (Upper Tallasee Dam)	Lake Yates was impounded July 1, 1928 and named for Eugene A. Yates, the Chief Engineer for Alabama Power dam building, who was hired in 1912. The nearest town is Tallassee, Alabama. Alabama Power maintains one public access site here.	Yates Dam As Seen From Thurlow Dam, 1996.
Lake Martin	Lake Martin was impounded December 31, 1926 and named for Thomas Martin. He was president of Alabama Power Company from 1920 to 1949, and chief executive officer from 1949 to 1963. The lake impounds 44,000 acres (160 km^{2}) with 700 miles (1000 km) of shoreline. The nearest town is Dadeville, Alabama. Lake Martin is an Alabama Power lake with a 154,200-kilowatt generating capacity. It is a recreational lake with fishing opportunities for largemouth bass, Alabama bass, bluegill and other sunfish, crappie, catfish, striped bass and white bass. Alabama Power maintains eleven public access sites on the lake.	
Lake R. L. Harris (Lake Wedowee)	Lake R. L. Harris Lake was impounded April 20, 1983 and named for Rother L. "Judge" Harris, an Alabama Power director and vice president of electric operations. The lake covers 10,600 acres (43 km^{2}) with 271 miles (436 km) of shoreline. The nearest town is Lineville, Alabama. R. L. Harris is an Alabama Power lake with a 135,000-kilowatt generating capacity. It is a recreational lake with fishing opportunities for largemouth bass, spotted bass, bluegill and other sunfish, crappie, catfish, striped bass, hybrid and white bass. Alabama Power maintains six public access sites on the lake.	R. L. Harris Dam, 1996.

== Significant tributaries ==
The Tallapoosa River's drainage has many significant tributaries which reflected below based on their location within the watershed.

Location	Tributaries
Headwaters to R. L. Harris Dam	Little Tallapoosa River
R. L. Harris Dam to Martin Dam	Emuckfaw Creek, Sandy Creek, Wind Creek, Chikasanoxee Creek, Hillabee Creek
Martin Dam to Yates Dam	Saugahatchee Creek
Yates Dam to Thurlow Dam	No Major Tributaries
Thurlow Dam to Coosa River Confluence	Tumcheehatchee Creek, Chubbehatchee Creek, Cubahatchee Creek, Calabee Creek, Line Creek

== Advocates ==
The Coosa-Alabama River Improvement Association, founded in 1890 in Gadsden, Alabama to promote navigation on the Coosa River is a leading advocate of the economic, recreational and environmental benefits of the Coosa and Tallapoosa River systems.

The Alabama Rivers Alliance works to unite the citizens of Alabama to protect peoples right to clean, healthy, waters.

Alabama Water Watch is dedicated to volunteer citizen monitoring of water quality in Alabama Rivers.

The Alabama Power Foundation is a non-profit foundation providing grants for watershed, environmental and community projects along the Tallapoosa River and within the state of Alabama

The Coosa River Basin Initiative is a grassroots environmental organization with the mission of informing and empowering citizens so that they may become involved in the process of creating a clean, healthy and economically viable Coosa River Basin.

== Major cities ==
A number of significant cities lie on the banks of the Tallapoosa River. They include:

- Heflin, Alabama - headwaters
- Buchanan, Georgia - headwaters
- Tallapoosa, Georgia - headwaters
- Wedowee, Alabama - near R. L Harris Lake (Lake Wedowee)
- Lineville, Alabama - near R.L harris Lake (Lake Wedowee
- Wadley, Alabama- on the banks of the Tallapoosa River
- Alexander City, Alabama - north flank of Lake Martin
- Dadeville, Alabama - south flank of Lake Martin
- Tallassee, Alabama - site of Lower Tallassee Dam
- Wetumpka, Alabama - near confluence with Coosa River forming the Alabama River
- Montgomery, Alabama - Tallapoosa River is major source (60%) of drinking water for city.
