= Pafalaya =

Mississippian polity in Alabama (c. 1120 to 1690)

Province of Pafalaya/Moundville phase polity Pa'sfalaya
- c. 1120–1690
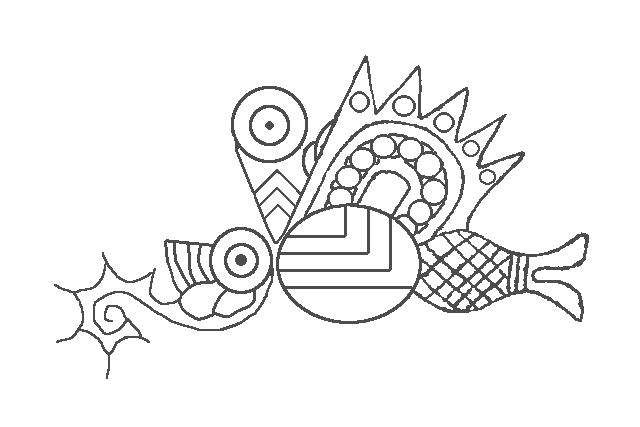
- Mothra Deity depicted in the Willoughby Disc found at Moundville (among other palettes and artifacts), possibly a symbol of the Moundville polity

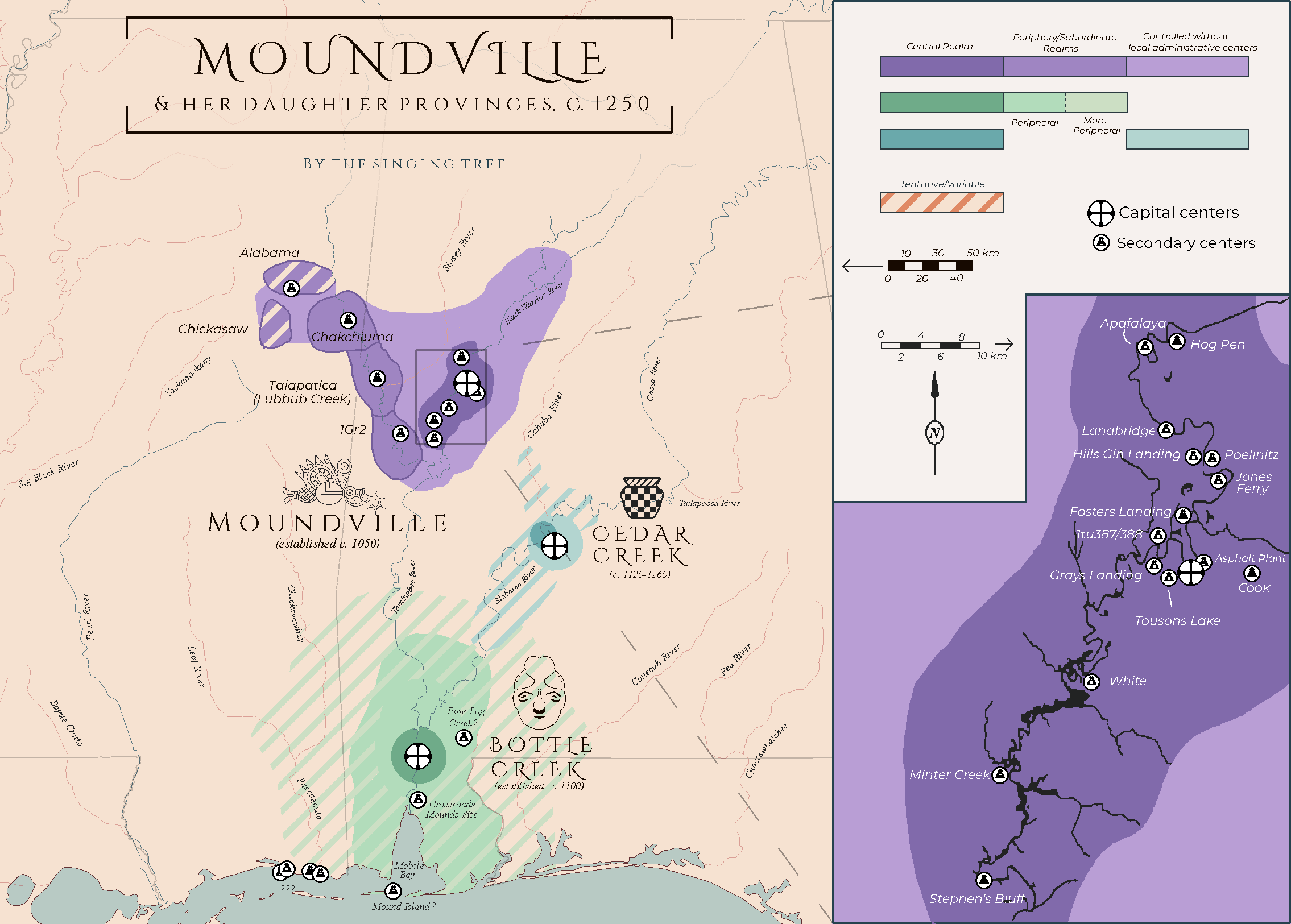
- Alabama in the mid-13th century: Moundville Province Bottle Creek Province (Chickasawhays?)
- Status: Mississippian-culture micoship
- Location: Black Warrior River
- Capital: Moundville (Zabusta?)
- Common languages: Muskogean; Alabama?; Choctaw?; Muscogee?
- Government: Monarchy
- Mico
- Historical era: Middle Mississippian period
  - Establishment of the Moundville Site during the West Jefferson phase: c. 1050
  - Start of Moundville I period (Consolidation of the Moundville Province): c. 1120
  - Intrusion of a Moundville lineage to Mobile Bay: c. 1120 – c. 1260
  - Intrusion of a Moundville lineage to the Alabama River: c. 1120 – c. 1260
  - Extension of influence into the Tombigbee chiefdoms (Chickasaw, alabama, chakchiuma): 13th century
  - Second Intrusion into the Alabama River/Founding of the Tuskaloosa chiefdom: 1450
  - De Soto arrives in Pafalaya: 1540
  - Final move to the Alabama River to join the Creek Confederacy: 1690
Preceded by
West Jefferson phase
Shiloh Indian Mounds
Succeeded by
Creek Confederacy
Tuskaloosa chiefdom
Choctaw
Moculixa
Taliepacana
Chickasaw
Chakchiuma
Alibamu
Talapatica
Bottle Creek Mounds
Cedar Creek Mound
- Today part of: United States; Alabama; Mississippi

The Moundville phase polity, which was known to the early European explorers as the 'Province' of Pa'sfalaya/Pafalaya, was a major Mississippian polity in the U.S. state of Alabama. Centered in the Black Warrior River valley, the Mico (or "great cacique") of Moundville held enormous amounts of power over its people. When its much more diminished descendants were encountered by a Spanish expedition, even they (called "lords" by the chroniclers) were able to manage and relocate whole granaries, mobilize forces, organize expedition parties and hire guides to help the Spanish. A large portion of the chiefdom split off in 1450 for a variety of reasons. Crop failure, political infighting, end of the Moundville lineage, disagreements on the polity's future, or even violent civil war all could have contributed to the split of Pafalaya. This successor was the Tascalusa chiefdom, who had migrated east to the Alabama River. Its capital was located at Atahachi, and is known archaeologically as the "Big Eddy phase."

The beginning of Mississippian influence is considered to have been established c. 1070 under the West Jefferson phase, but the Moundville phase only began around 1120, founded by a group who split away from the Shiloh phase.

Over the course of a century, the Moundville phase polity would rise to great heights. At least 29 mounds in its capital, and a population in its core region of around 1,000 people. By 1250, it likely held regional primacy over neighboring mound sites, notably Chakchiuma (at the Butler mound), and Talapatica (possibly located at the Lubbub Creek mound). Prestige goods from all over the Southeast arrived in the grand plaza of moundville for the elite and the Mico of Moundville, Appalachian copper, Lower Mississippian art, Cahokian stones, pearls and shells from the coast, colorful gemstones, and Datura substances from New Mexico all coming together to be used in ceremonies and to boost the seeming divinity of Moundville elite.

Moundville phase continued to prosper somewhat during the early 14th century and prestige goods might've even increased in the region, despite mounds on the Moundville site itself being slowly abandoned. After however, it is certain that by 1400 Moundville began to decline in long-distance prestige goods exchange. High status individuals began to be buried away from the mounds, and by the late 15th century most mounds in the valley had stopped being built.

Several scholars have proposed that the religious leader of Moundville still held a de jure sovereignty among the inhabitants of the Black Warrior River Valley. Interestingly, the various De Soto chronicles seem to identifiy a de facto ruler in the region, who met with the expedition at the 15th-16th century Snow's Bend Site (town of Apafalaya?) in the northern area of the Moundville phase.

The first group that separated from Shiloh had separated at the same time as another group, the Apalachicola, eventually known archaeologically as the Rood phase. Possibly even splitting for the same reason, the people of Moundville likely remained amicable with Apalachicola throughout the centuries, and reunited with them under the Creek Confederacy in the 1600s-1700s.

== Nomenclature ==
The archaeological manifestation of the Moundville phase and its namesake most famous site, was named such for its large earthen pyramids. Charles Hudson, leading expert on the De Soto Expedition, identifies the Moundville site as Zabusta "The Place of Burr-Oaks." The region as a whole was called variously by the De Soto Chronicles as The Province of Pafalaya, Pafallaya. It's believed that Pafalaya or Pafallaya was identical to the name used by neighboring tribes to call the Choctaws, Pa'sfalaya, or the long-haired ones. This is because of the Eastern Division of the Choctaws, likely the continuation of the Province of Pafalaya.

== History ==
=== Pre-Moundville initial Mississippianization (1070–1120) ===
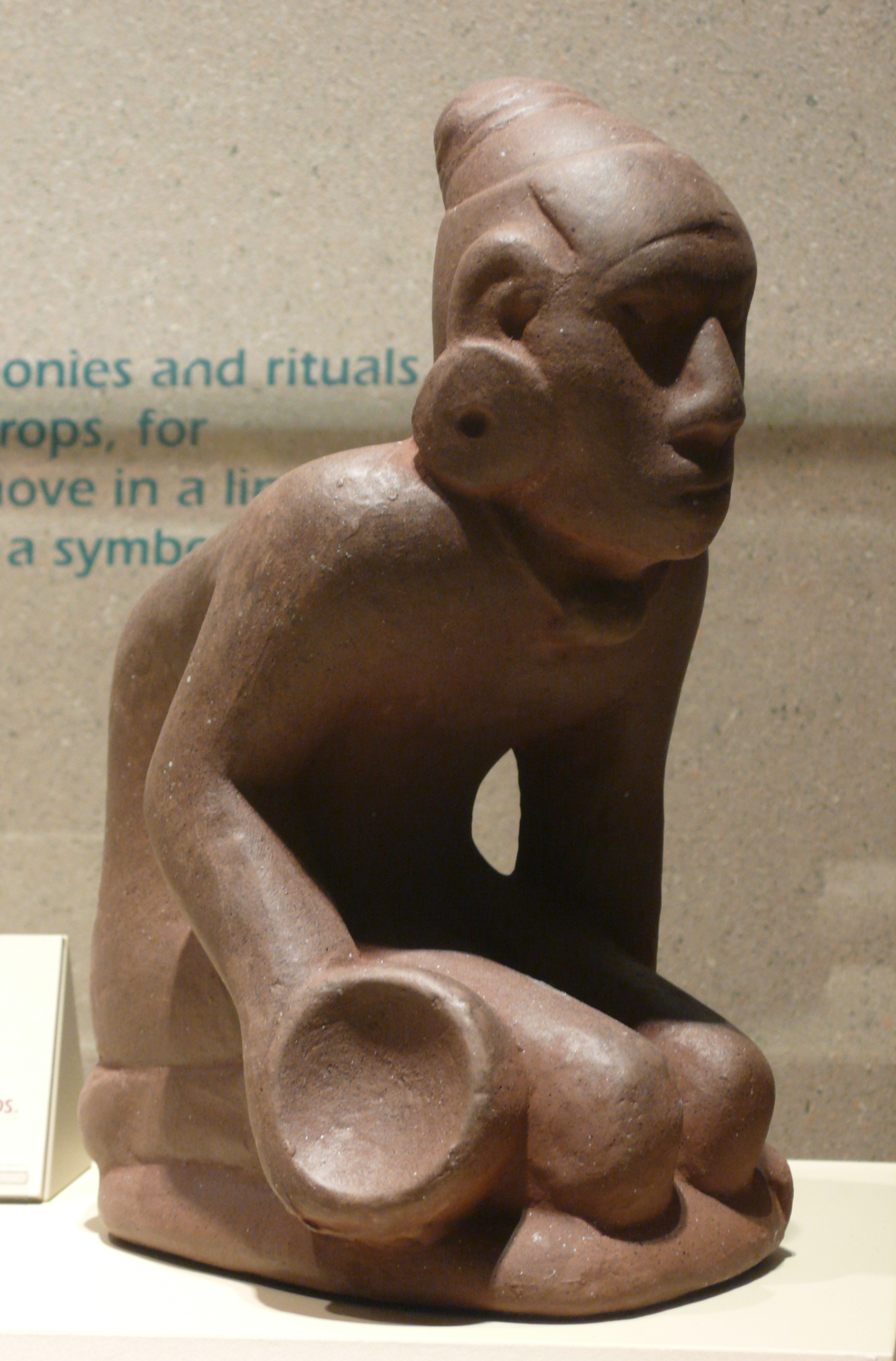
Mississippian statuette of a Chunkey player

The Mississippian Era was defined by intense maize agriculture (brought by the Corn Mother religious movement), temple mounds, and theocratic-aristocratic "theater states." Among Muscogee-speakers (whom are one of the descended groups of Moundville and Mississippians), the base government subdivision was the Talwa or Okla, the greater town or chiefdom, ruled by a Mico. The beginnings of Mississippian influence in the Black Warrior River Valley began in the 1070s, when the West Jefferson phase emerged. the West Jefferson phase is viewed as a Woodland group in the process of Mississippianization, transition to a Mississippian culture. It held some Mississippian traits such as shell-working industry, chunkey-stone manufacturing and the presence of foreign Mississippian green-stones. The not yet consolidated, but partially Mississippianized made it a perfect destination for a certain group of Mississippians coming out from the Shiloh phase.

=== Founding and initial consolidation (1120–1200) ===
The transition from West Jefferson to the Moundville I phase is dated to around 1120. The establishment of the Moundville phase is thought to be an exodus coming out from the Shiloh site, perhaps leaving due to a Cahokian relationship to Shiloh around this time, the product of which were the first mounds at Shiloh. Another group that left around this time, perhaps even for the same reason as Moundville, was the ancestors of the Rood phase, or the Province of Apalachicola. This ancestral tie between the Apalachicola and Moundville came into use centuries down the line, when the Moundville-descended Alabama River Province, the Moundville-descended Cusseta Province, and Apalachicola Province allied to form the Muscogee Confederacy.

=== Regional dominance and elaboration of power (1200–1300) ===
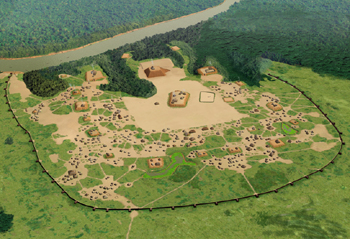
Moundville/Zabusta (?) in an illustration by Herb Roe

Starting from 1200, Moundville grew rapidly. At its peak there were at least 29 earthen pyramids in its capital of Moundville (possibly known as Zabusta). This core population was spread out in many small farming settlements, grouped and governed by a dozen or more administrative mound centers home to only some bureaucrats and the Mico (chief or lord)'s immediate family. The nucleated center at it all, Zabusta/Moundville, was only home to around 1,000-1,700 people permanently, but likely held elaborate and large festivities seasonally that included most of the province, much like other Mississippian capitals, such as Ivitachuco in Apalachee which assembled at least 30,000 people at a time for certain, possibly religious, events (in that case Catholic Spaniards). This limitation in a nucleated residential population comes from a mixture of factors, like lack of modes of transportation for firewood and food.

By 1250, its sociopolitical influence reached beyond its core province, notably at Chakchiuma (Administratively based at the Butler mound), Talapatica (possibly based at the Lubbub Creek mound) and the 1GR2 mound chiefdom. Considering the relationship of Chakchiuma with the Chickasaw and Alabama Micoships during contact period, and the general distance that other Mississippian polities extended, it's likely that the Chickasaw and Alabama also had some sort of tributary relationship with Moundville.

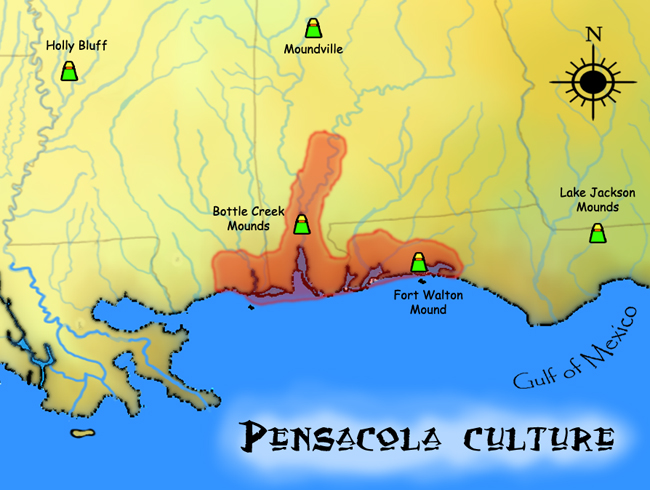
Geographic extent of the Pensacola culture, a Mississippian manifestation with Moundville and Lower Mississippian influences.

The Moundville Province became so large that groups began to split from Moundville, like Moundville did from Shiloh. One chiefly lineage is thought to have left to the Bottle Creek Mounds north of Mobile Bay during this period and another to the Cedar Creek Mound site on the Alabama River. The Bottle Creek Mounds was the capital of a kingdom unrivaled across the entire Gulf Coast with subsidiary centers like the Crossroads Mounds site in the vicinity of Lower Halls Landing, Baldwin County, likely ancestral to the Chickasawhays that moved west to join the Choctaw Confederacy after contact. This intrusion was the beginning of a Gulf Coast manifestation of the Mississippian culture, known as the Pensacola Culture, composed principally of influences from Moundville and the Lower Mississippi Valley. The Cedar Creek mound site, near Elm Bluff, Alabama, was another intrusion of Moundvillians, this time to the Alabama River. They became a regional center for the local woodland White Oak phase, reflecting a mix of both White Oak and Moundville I designs in their ceramics.

=== Necropolis and decentralized stage (1300–1530) ===
Mounds continued to be expanded and raised throughout the late 13th century, but as the Medieval Warm Period came to a close, elaborate ceremonialism involving the entire population of the valley became more difficult to sustain, and the Moundville Province had to look inward to maintain its own population before projecting power outwards, likely leading to the decline in hard power material influences on the former tributaries.

To accommodate this development, elites began to repurpose Moundville/Zabusta itself as a necropolis, a ceremonial center for death. Already considered a prestigious place for souls to enter the Milky Way (due to the alignment of its pyramids), Moundville leaned even more into this spiritual and mortuary aspect. Academics now believe that Moundville became a place where ritualism was conducted to contact dead souls, possibly with the help of Datura psychoactive substances, linked to a new religious movement based around Datura and a giant Moth deity. The former neighborhoods within Zabusta emptied out into farmsteads, small farming settlements, dispersed throughout the valley that answer to small administrative mound centers that held only the administrators, bureaucrats, the Mico (king or lord) and his immediate family.

In the 15th century Moundville's prestige elite burials shifted to outside the walls of Moundville, signaling another blow to Moundville's prestige. Conflict plagued the early 15th century province, and it came to a boiling point around 1450, when a substantial Moundville phase population left the province to the Alabama River, formerly the outskirts of the Paramountcy. The newly established the Province of Tascalusa, expanded rapidly, courting a Bottle Creek offshoot, the Province of Mabila (known as the Furman phase), partially subjugating the minor chiefdom of Piachi, and partially subjugating the province of Talisi. After contact, the democratized Tascalusa would eventually ally with their related Province of Apalachicola to form the powerful Muscogee/Creek Confederacy. It's been proposed that, although diminished, Moundville still could've remained prestigious enough to be the de jure ceremonial capital of the Province of Pafalaya even until the De Soto Period. We may never know for sure, but perhaps the Lord of Pafalaya at the Snow's Bend Site (town of Apafalaya?) seen by De Soto was an attempt at reestablishing a centralized Moundville chiefdom.

=== Creation of the Choctaw Confederacy (1530–1690) ===
During this period, the Province of Pafalaya moved to the headwaters of the Sucarnoochee River and along the Noxubee River to form the Eastern Division of the Choctaw Confederacy, Okla Tannap or Ahepat. The Choctaw Confederacy was formed from the Mississippian-era alliance between the Okla Tannap and the Natchez-adjacent Pearl River Okla (ancestors of Okla Hannali, or Sixtowns), moving to greener pastures due to a devastating drought from 1569-1587. This does not seem to be a completely unified move, however, as certain Mico like Talicpacana and Moculixa seem to have joined the Muscogee Confederacy instead, and in fact were fleeing from the Choctaws. This may imply some sort of "Join us, or die." policy by the Pafalaya Choctaws.

== Government and military ==
During their peak in the 12th to early 13th centuries, the aristocratic government likely functioned with a main council, as was the norm among their descendant Choctaws and Muscogee Confederacies. The executive officer of the government was known as the Mico, who collaborated with other "principal men" in the council, to oversee public works, organize ritual events and conduct foreign policy. Clan Priests, especially during the heyday of elaborate ritual during the Mississippian period, also held a substantial amount of power, especially during the Mississippian heyday. The composition of the so-called principal men of the council is not known, but it is generally believed to have been made up of powerful Clan Priests, Hatak-holitopa (Experienced and influential class of people, usually elders. Known variously as "rich men," "nobleman," "gentleman"), Heniha ("second men," bureaucrats, planners, chosen from each clan), and high-ranking individuals of the Taska class (warriors; for the specific roles look below).

=== Mico-ship ===
The Mico acted as the hereditary main executive officer and representative of the Council, and also contributed with legal knowledge and expertise. Although the Mico likely held substantial secular power throughout most of the Moundville phase, it's been proposed that it was either mixed with a religious aspect or power was outright replaced by Clan Priests during the Mississippian heyday and the Necropolis era. Though the latter possibility has some support, it's worth noting that the Mico itself might've originated as a Clan Priest title, considering that the Apalachee (who spoke a related Muskogean language) word for "sun" was Nico, similar to the Muscogee Mico. Mississippian rulers in general tended titles referencing the Sun, such as the Great Sun among the Natchezan-speakers as a reference to their relation to the Sun deity. Perhaps the Mico of Pafalaya originated as a title for the Clan Priest who claimed a special relation with the Sun.

After gaining secular power over the course of the Early and Middle Mississippian period, the Mico began to lose their religious role in the Late Mississippian period (due to the declining prestige goods exchange and environmental disasters), but seemed to still retain secular power. At contact, various Mico in Pafalaya was able to command large evacuations of people and transportations of food stores within days of De Soto's arrival.

Mico among other Mississippians tend to adopt the name of their territory, for example the Mico of Joara in North Carolina was called Joara Mico. There also existed a Fanni Mico, who worked as a secretary of state, managing diplomatic relations with foreign entities.

Mico not only had secular duties as manager of the public granary, head of the council, and receiver of foreigners and diplomats but also held religious and ritual duties, probably because of their aforementioned relation with the Sun. The Mico presided over Chunkey games, the Green Corn Ceremony, New Fire Ceremony and other ritual events. He was, at least in the contact period, meant to swear his devotion to the Path of Peace, and to never shed human blood.

=== Mico Apelichika Afullota ===
Mico Apelichika Afullota (English: Circuit of a King's Dominion) was a concept among descendants of the Moundville phase, notably the Choctaw, used to mean the political territory defined by the circuit of the king. This concept aligns well with a theory in Mississippian scholarship, whereby the core dominion of a Mississippian Mico was limited by how far he could walk/administrate, usually in circles wherein the radius is 18km. The primary mound centers in Georgia seemed to mostly follow this rule, where secondary centers were within 18km, and the nearest primary mound center being 33km or more away.

=== Civil servants ===
The Mico was assisted in carrying out civic actions principally by the Henihas (translated as second men, bureaucrats, planners), Imalas (advisors and assistants), and Micalgi (lawyers, those who understand the details of civic government). Such civic actions could include planning harvests and communal fields, principally the job of Henihas, coming to a consensus (for the entire town) regarding a contentious issue, giving speeches, planned by the Mico and spoken to the public through his speaker, the Yatika, an official well-versed not only in public speaking, but also in the various regional languages. Among other Mississippian groups, like the Natchez, respected elders (the Isti Atcagagi of the Muscogee) also could act as judges if need be, and perhaps this was also a feature of Pafalaya, though this role might've been filled by the Micalgi, whose job was to "understood the details of civic government." The building of new houses for newlyweds, enlargement or building of palisades, preparation of the Black Drink (a caffeinated beverage used in ritual), and public feasts were all also responsibilities of the council, principally carried out by the various Heniha, the Mico, and his Imala.

=== Administration ===
The main capital and ceremonial center of the Moundville phase/Pafalaya, at least until the early 1400s, was the Moundville Archaeological Site, possibly known as Zabusta. It's even been suggested that it remained the de jure ceremonial center until the 1500s. During the De Soto Expedition however, the residence of the 'lord' was located at the Snow's Bend site to the north of Moundville. Perhaps it was an attempt at creating a new center of prestige after the Tascalusa group had abandoned the region.

It's also possible that Snow's Bend was merely the new administrative center, while Moundville could've served as a White Sanctuary. Within these White Sanctuaries (also known as the old-beloved, ancient, or holy town) you were forbidden from murder, or even spilling blood. White Sanctuaries (called such because white was considered the color of peace) functioned as safe havens for elopers, adulterers, and people accused of other crimes, as well as locations where enemies could come together and negotiate disputes.White Sanctuaries were designated as such because they were "mother" or "grandmother" towns from which daughter towns split off from. Among indigenous peoples of the Southesat, mediation of disputes was secured by going up the descent line. Mothers mediated sibling disputes, grandmothers mediated cousin disputes, etc. This principle was carried out to towns, therefore Moundville may have served as a location where the various Mico of Apafalaya, Moculixa, and Taliepacana could come together and negotiate disputes in the name of their "grandmother," much like how an actual grandmother would help negotiate disputes between her descendants.

The closest affiliated towns subject to Moundville likely paid tribute in the form of corn, while the more distant towns paid tribute in the form of skins, nuts, fruits, and other forest products, as was the norm among other Mississippian polities like Coosa. Due to the decline in prestige goods in neighboring, formerly independent, mound sites correlating to Moundville's rise, prestige goods were also probably funneled away from subject towns to Moundville, reinforcing their role as paramount. Like among the Apalachee Mississippians, various Mico under Moundville's rule probably came from the same clan or same two clans.

=== Military ===
Choctaw military hierarchy

Pafalaya warriors were likely organized similarly to their descended Muscogee (of whom the Tascalusa that split from Pafalaya form a part of) and Choctaw (of whom the Pafalaya formed a part of after contact) system. Mississippian armies were incredibly regulated, and with specific rankings. The Apalachee for example, had scalp requirements for each rank. A warrior who had obtained a single scalp was a Tascaia. One who had taken three scalps was a Noroco. The highest title a warrior could attain was Nicoguadca, or "lightning." Attaining this legendary title required one to have killed ten enemies, and three of these had to be warriors who were higher ranked than Tascaias. Among the contact-period Choctaw (of whom the Pafalaya were a part of), there were at least two military ranks attainable within the War Class (Taska) above the basic designation as Taska. The lieutenants (Taska Minkochi in Choctaw), and the majors, who also acted as masters of ceremony (Tishu Minko in Choctaw). All three ranks received their titles in recognition of their having performed warlike feats, the war chiefs having accomplished the most. One of the lieutenants was designated by the Beloved Men as "Great Warrior" (Tastanagi Tako in Muscogee) and had the duty of leading his chiefdom in war, aided by the lieutenants. Great Warriors supposedly held immense amounts of power, but only for matters of war. When war was declared, it was announced by the Great Warrior. He also arranged with the Great Warriors of other chiefdoms to have ball games. These ball games, Toli, known as "the younger brother of war," were not just games, but had important political functions.

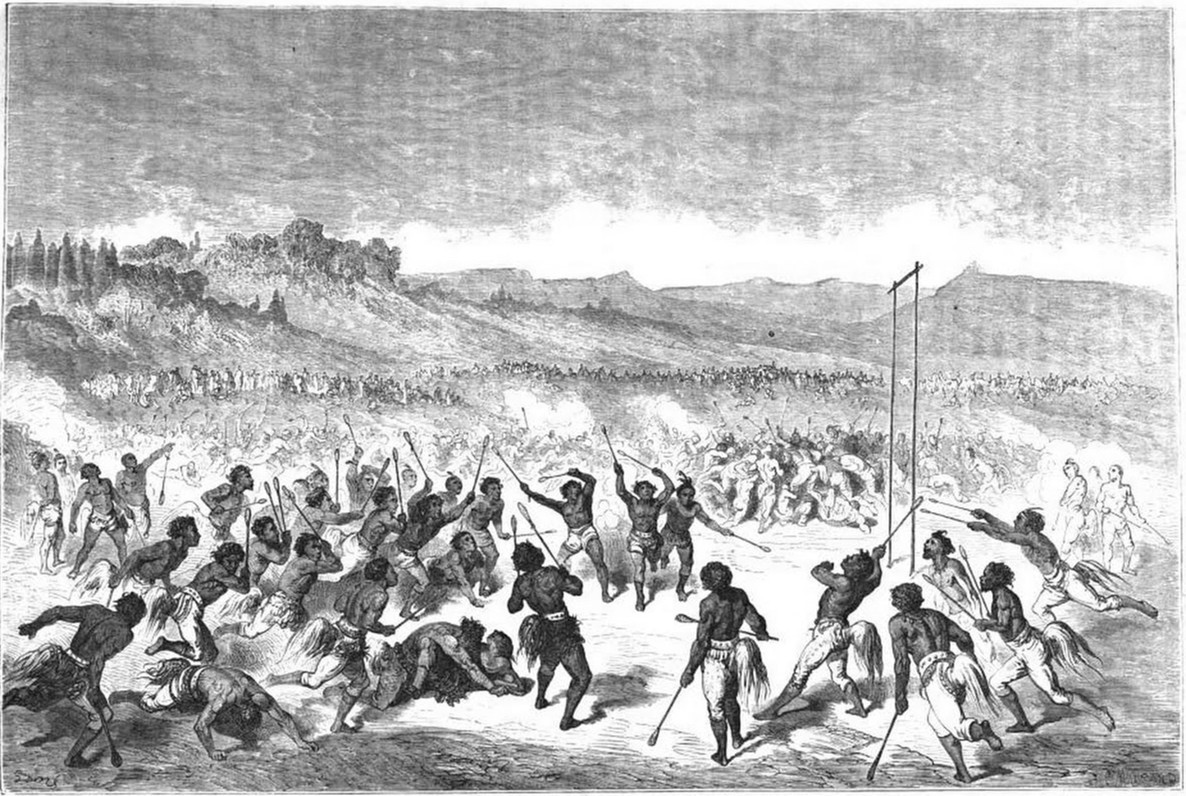
Choctaw Toli or ball game

Along with the ranks of war, there also exists the Hatak Imatali, or "supporting men," males who've not achieved any scalps or who have killed only a woman or a child. They did the more menial tasks in war, like carrying equipment as porters. During the contact period, Hatak Imatali were often elevated through participating in attacks with close relatives, who would award him some share of the scalps to improve his ranking. A raising of rank involved a naming ceremony, wherein the advancing individual is, especially in the higher ranks, awarded a war epithet. For example, Hopaii Hacho, Hopaii meaning the rank he's obtained (war-prophet) and Hacho being a war-related adjective, meaning "mad."

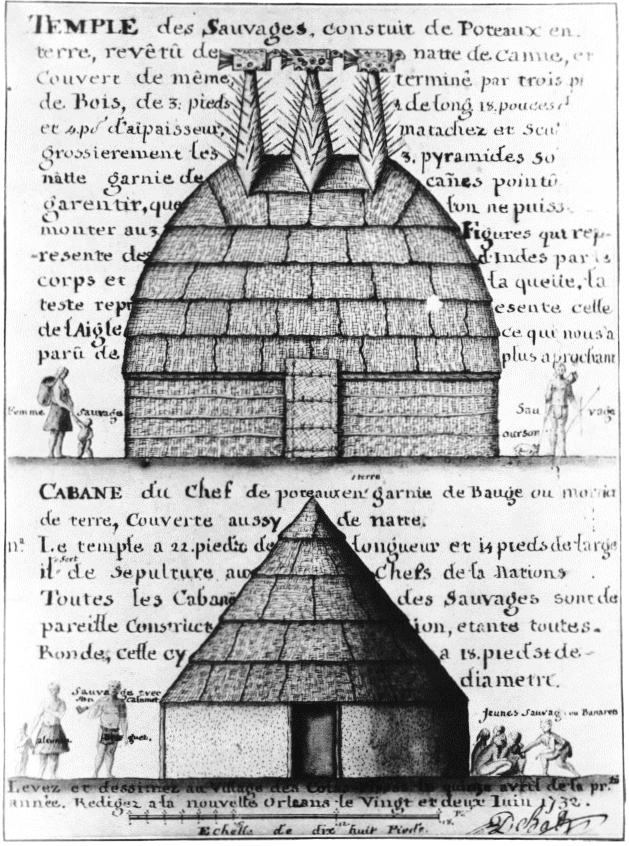
An example of what a Mississippian Temple could look like (top)

It's also noteworthy that warrior organizations likely existed among the Pafalaya, for example the Unkala, a priestly order who worked as custodians of the "House of Warriors" or Taskatchúka. This temple was allegedly the oldest settlement among the Choctaws, and stood on the banks of the Cushtusia Creek in Neshoba County, Mississippi. The I′ksa A′numpule or "clan-speakers" prepared the bones of great warriors for burial, and the Unkala went at the head of the mourners to that temple, chanting hymns in an unknown tongue.

== Culture ==
=== Languages ===
The people that made up the Moundville phase, the Province of Pafalaya, likely spoke a variety of Muskogean languages and dialects. A dialect Choctaw, whose Eastern Division was founded by Pafalaya descendants, was probably one such language, as well as other Muskogean languages like Chickasaw or Alabama, both possible tributaries of Moundville. Another main descendant of Moundville, the Province of Tascalusa, formed part of the Creek/Muscogee Confederacy. Therefore it's likely Muscogee was another language spoken among Pafalayand, especially considering that the Apalachicola, the main component of the Muscogee, is considered to have been related to Moundville's first rulers, sharing a common origin in the Shiloh polity on the Tennessee River. It's worth noting that the Eastern Division Choctaw supposedly had closer linguistic ties to the Alabama rather than Western Division Choctaw, which is where modern Standard Choctaw comes from.

=== Art ===
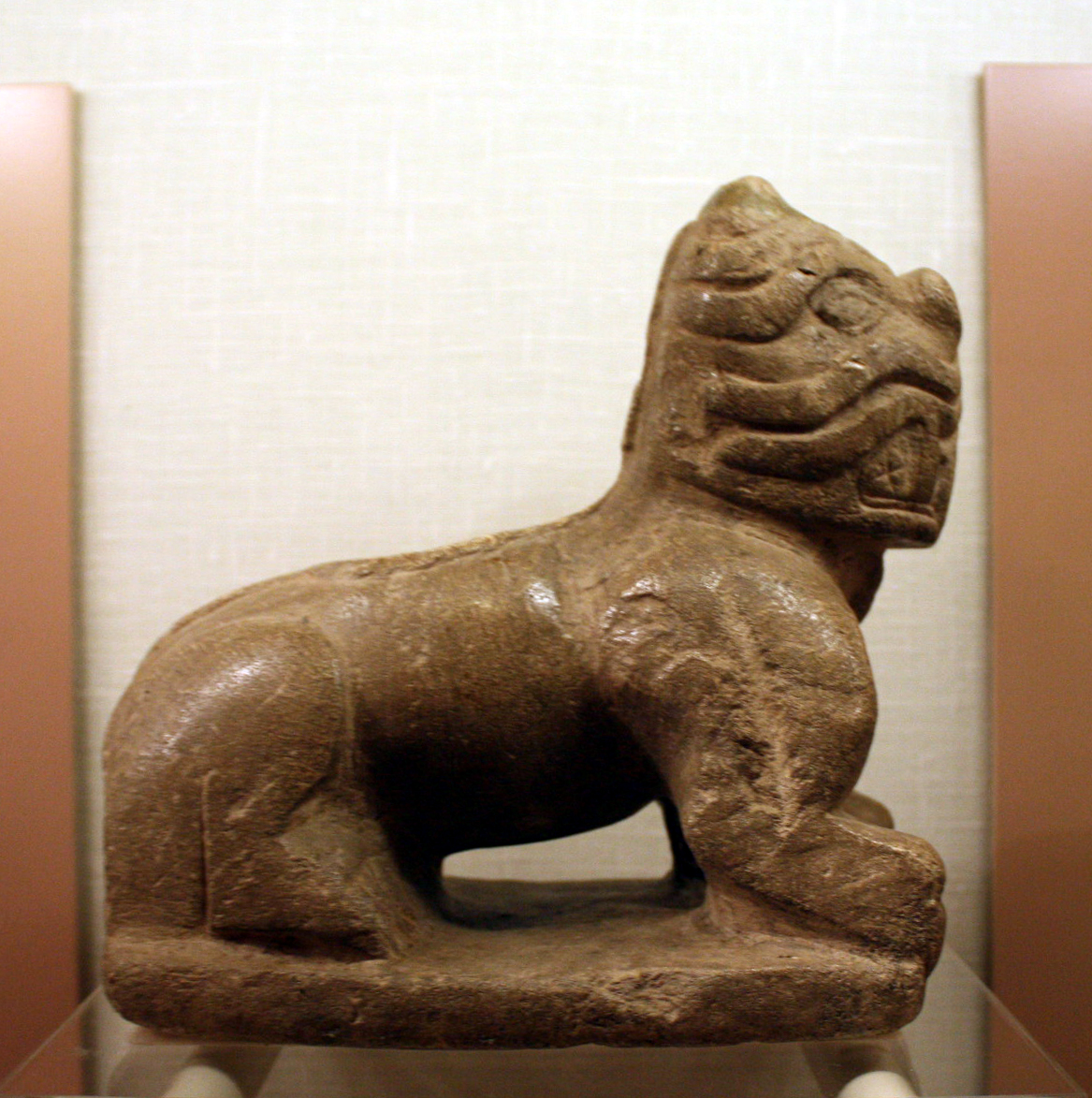
Feline statuette from Moundville

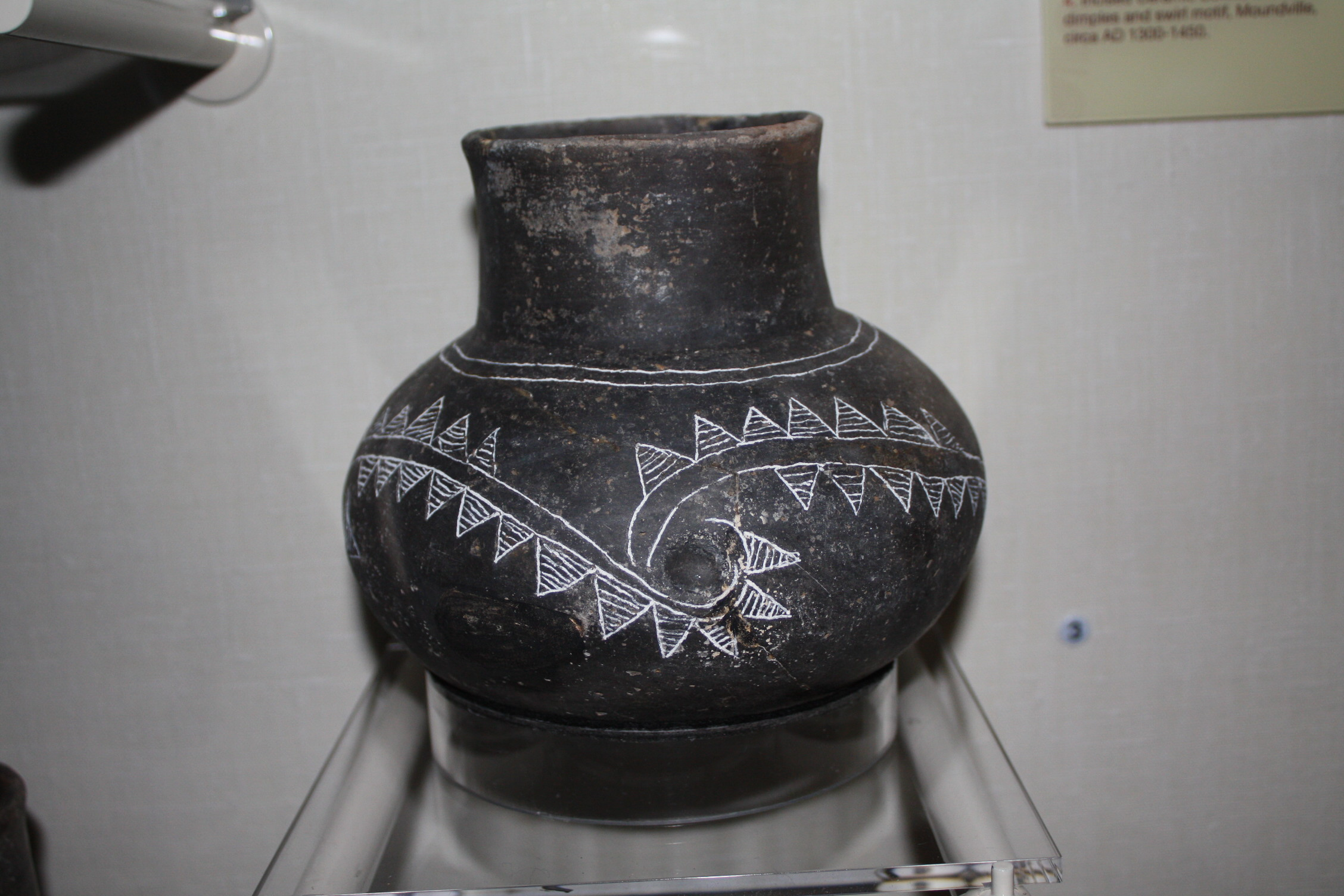
Mothra deity motif on a piece of Moundville pottery

Moundville is believed to have been thought of as an important portal to cross on to the Path of Souls (especially during the post-1300 Necropolis Era), and had a special association with the Beneath World. This is reflected in their art with designs featuring the Hand-in-Eye symbol, which represents the Milky Way, the Great Serpents, considered Lords of the Underworld, skulls and bones.

=== Social organization ===
Like the rest of the Southeast, there were probably exogamous white and red moieties among the Pafalaya, which were further subdivided into clans, named after associated animals, which was further subdivided into lineages. These clans were theoretically universal throughout much of the Eastern Woodlands, for example a member of the Deer Clan from Taliepacana could and would be accommodated by the Deer Clan in Ontario. Clans were responsible if a murder was committed by one of their members, and would have to compensate with material goods or allowing revenge of some sort. There was a vague notion that animals whom the clans were named after shouldn't be killed or eaten by the clan members, but it was not a serious prohibition.

== Religion ==
=== Cosmic worldview ===
The Mississippian cosmos consisted of three worlds: in addition to This World, an Above World existed above the sky vault, an inverted bowl of solid rock which rose and fell each day, at dawn and at dusk, so that the sun and moon could pass beneath it, and a Beneath World existed below the earth and the waters. The world was thought of to be separated in four corners by a cross, and Moundville may have thought of itself as the center of the cross. In the Above World, things existed in an orderly manner, grander and purer form than in this world, while the Below World was conceived of as a realm of disorder and change. This Realm stood somewhere between perfect order and complete chaos

=== The Sun ===
Key to the Pafalaya worldview was the importance of the Sun, which might've been thought of as a deity that watched them with its great fiery eye that kept them safe, and if the eye was diverted, all would go wrong. It's worth noting that the Pafalaya head of state, the Mico, might've had a connection with the Sun deity, considering that the Apalachee (who spoke a related Muskogean language) word for "sun" was Nico, similar to the Muscogee Mico, and that other Mississippians, like the Natchez, had political leaders known as "Suns". This pattern possibly extended beyond Mississippian cultures, such as the Chonnonton leader Tsouharissen's tentative connection.

=== Connection with the Path of Souls ===
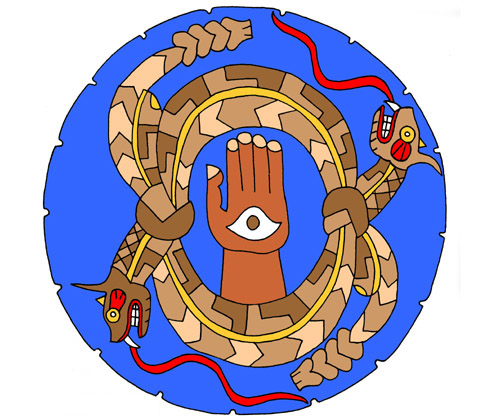
Entry to the path of souls surrounded by Great Serpents, aka the Lords of the Underworld, depicted on a Moundville stone palette

The worldview of Moundville is considered to have been similar to the rest of the Mississippian world, with a conception of an Above World, Earth, and a Beneath World. Moundville specifically appears to have had a special relationship with the Path of Souls and the Beneath World, considering that their art, symbols and iconography were exclusively associated with beneath world iconography, like the Path of Souls, the Great Serpent (Lord of the Beneath World), skulls and bones. Its earthen pyramids also seem to point to the northeast entry point to the Path of Souls (the Milky Way). This excessive association with the Beneath World has led academics to believe that Moundville was considered to be an especially important entry point in the Mississippian world to cross on to the Path of Souls, perhaps even a place where commuting with the dead was easier.

=== The Datura Ritual Complex (c. 1300 – c. 1450) ===
During the 1300s, a new type of religious ceremony from the west was gripping the Mississippian world, The Datura Ritual Complex. Datura is a flowering plant sacred to many American groups containing psychoactive alkaloids that, when consumed, can induce hallucinations. It has long been argued that ceramic vessels with exterior surfaces that are covered with small nodes are Datura seed pod effigies, and represented a strand of native ritual associated with the Datura plant, the moth that pollinates the Datura, Datura flower motifs, the night sky associated with Datura and the Beneath World associated with the night sky.

The distribution of Datura ritual usage in the contiguous USA stretches from the Chumash in southern California to the Algonquians on the East Coast. Beginning in the Southwest of the United States as early as 850 among the Hohokam, it quickly spread throughout the Southwest, persisting into the 1300s among the Hohokam and Mogollon, and centuries longer among the Ancestral Puebloans. Through the Caddoans in the 1200s-1300s, comprising parts of eastern Texas, southeastern Arkansas, and northeastern Louisiana, it spread into the Mississippi Valley and then to Moundville around the same time.

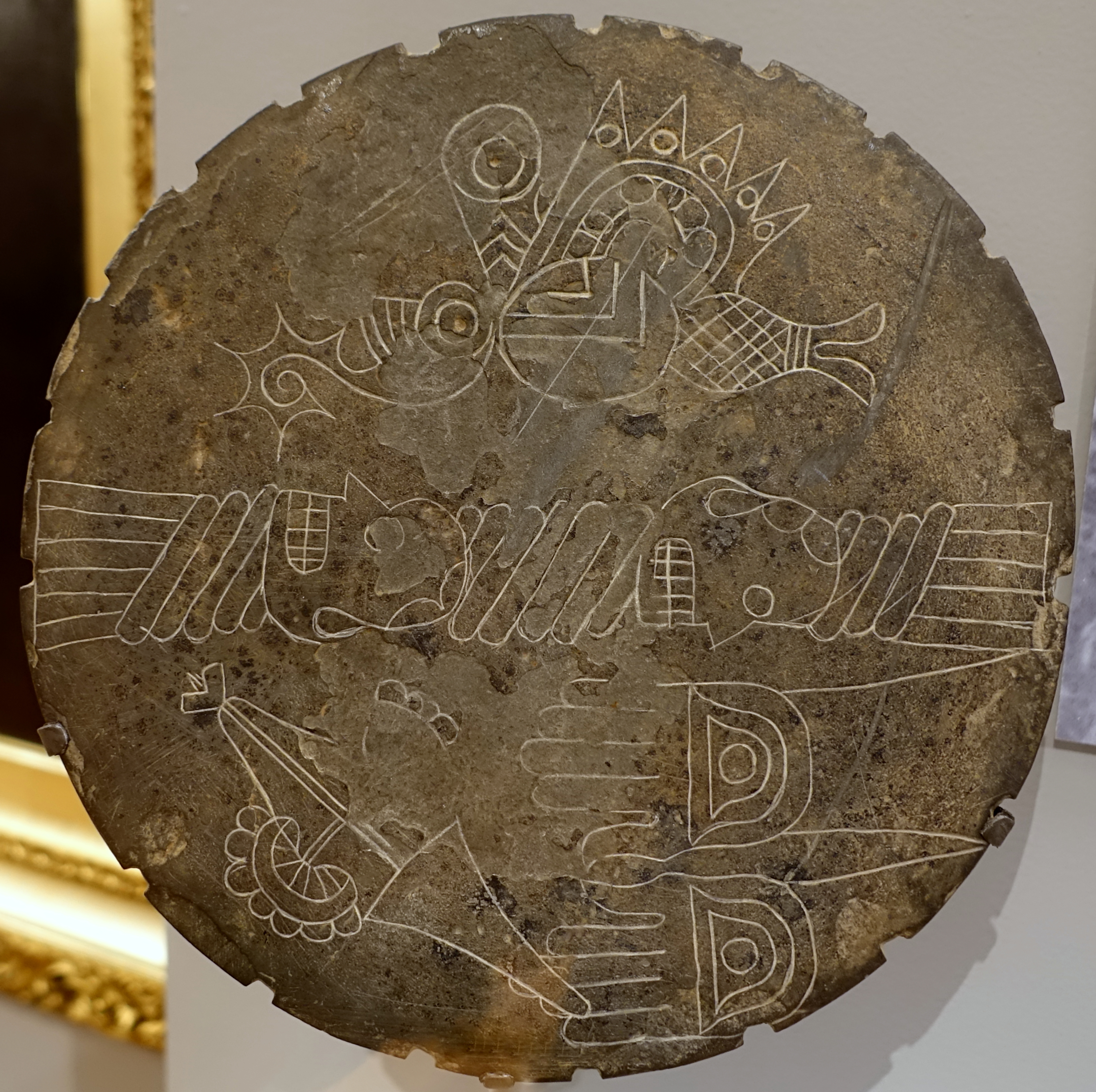
The Wiloughby Disc, possibly pictograph instructions for a ritual to contact the dead

The principal deity associated with the Datura Ritual Complex has been nicknamed "Mothra" by academics, after the namesake Japanese kaiju. Possibly known as "sho̱shi" by the Moundvillians (Choctaw for moth), it's likely that Mothra was an underworld deity, adopted by the Mississippians to be a reincarnation of the deity Evening Star and a reincarnation of Birdman. Evening Star is associated with the night and the beneath world, making the Mississippian interpretation of Mothra, based around the night time and beneath world Datura drug, as a reincarnation of Evening Star a natural adoption. This was not to say Mothra was sidelined in any way, and in fact Mothra was first identified at Moundville itself.

Mothra/the Datura Ritual Complex is featured most famously on the Wiloughby Disc at Moundville, likely symbolizing the Datura needed to conduct a ritual to contact the dead. The two skulls in the middle was meant to symbolize a sacred bundle also involved in the ritual, while the Bilobed Arrow and Eye-in-Hand motif on the bottom symbolized the Soul and the Path of Souls respectively.
