= Mercedes-Benz Amphitheater =

Outdoor amphitheater in Tuscaloosa, Alabama

Coordinates: 33°12′43.9″N 87°34′29.17″W

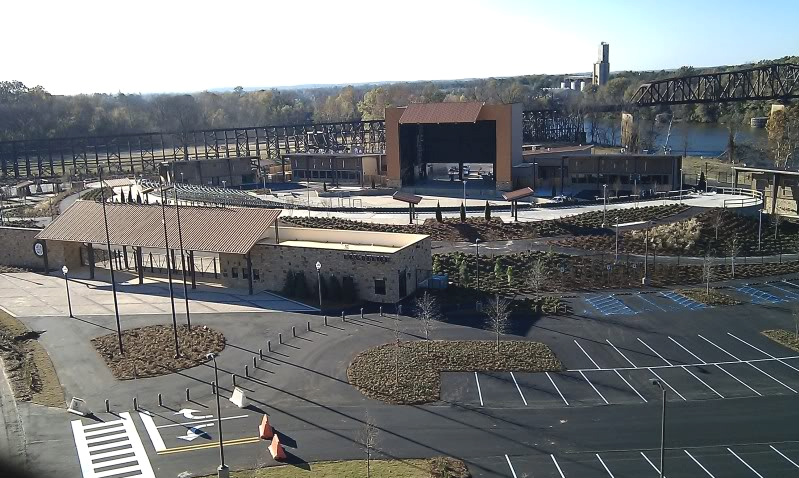
- The venue seen from the nearby bridge (c. 2010)
- Interactive map of Mercedes-Benz Amphitheater
- Former names: Tuscaloosa Amphitheater (2011-2023)
- Address: 2710 Jack Warner Pkwy; Tuscaloosa, AL 35401-1023; Tuscaloosa
- Owner: City of Tuscaloosa
- Operator: Danny Wimmer Presents
- Capacity: 8,410
- Acreage: 15 acres

Construction
- Groundbreaking: July 14, 2009
- Opened: April 1, 2011
- Cost: $14.9 million ($22.4 million in 2025 dollars)
- Architect: Davis Architects
- Project manager: HPM
- Structural engineer: Neel-Schaffer
- Services engineer: Hyde Engineering
- General contractor: Harrison Construction

Website
- mercedesbenzamphitheater.com

The Mercedes-Benz Amphitheater is an outdoor amphitheater in Tuscaloosa, Alabama that sits beautifully on 15 acres amidst the banks of the Black Warrior River. It's used primarily for music performances and has a capacity of 8,410.

The amphitheater is located on Jack Warner Parkway, just beside the Hugh R. Thomas Bridge. Minutes from the University of Alabama campus and blocks from the downtown district, the amphitheater is the largest outdoor venue in West Alabama and a premier location for arts and entertainment. In addition to many concerts, the amphitheater hosts the annual Celebration on the River, a free 4th of July celebration featuring the Tuscaloosa Symphony Orchestra. The venue also hosts graduations and is available to rent for private parties and events.

== History ==
The Mercedes-Benz Amphitheater, originally named the Tuscaloosa Amphitheater, was designed by Davis Architects and built by Harrison Construction. It broke ground on July 14, 2009, with an opening date estimated for August 2010. In the next few months, the Tuscaloosa area experienced record rainfall, delaying the opening until 2011.

Kenny Chesney, along with Uncle Kracker, were originally set to open the amphitheater with a concert on March 31, 2011, but scheduling conflicts led to the show being moved back to May 25. It was later announced that The Avett Brothers and Band of Horses would open the amphitheater on April 1, 2011, followed by Patti LaBelle and The O'Jays the next night.

Over the years, the amphitheater has hosted many great shows, including Phish, Def Leppard, John Mayer, The Lumineers, Fantasia, Dave Matthews Band, Jason Aldean, Mary J. Blige, Chris Stapleton, KEM, Widespread Panic, Jill Scott, Bob Dylan, ODESZA, Brad Paisley, Hall & Oates, John Legend, Willie Nelson, and Erykah Badu.

During the 2023 season finale, the Tuscaloosa Amphitheater announced its re-branding, and the name was changed to the Mercedes-Benz Amphitheater.

== See also ==
- List of contemporary amphitheaters
