= Woolsey Finnell Bridge =

- Coordinates: 33.223182°N 87.532625°W
- Carries: 4 lanes of US 82 (McFarland Boulevard)
- Crosses: Black Warrior River
- Locale: Tuscaloosa, Alabama
- Maintained by: Alabama Department of Transportation

History
- Opened: 1961

Statistics
- Daily traffic: 47,000 (2008 AADT)

Location
- Interactive map of Woolsey Finnell Bridge

The Woolsey Finnell Bridge is a four-lane, girder bridge spanning the Black Warrior River along U.S. Route 82 (McFarland Boulevard) in Tuscaloosa, Alabama that opened in 1961. The bridge takes its name from the former state director of highways for Alabama, Woolsey Finnell. This is one of only four vehicular bridges spanning the Black Warrior in Tuscaloosa.

Due to both the age of the structure as well as the bridge operating well above its designed capacity by the 1990s, calls for a new span across the river to alleviate some of the congestion were proposed. Both the Warrior Loop and the Paul Bryant Bridge are expected to absorb some of the 55,000 daily trips made across the bridge upon their respective completions.

== See also ==
- List of crossings of the Black Warrior River
