= List of crossings of the Black Warrior River =

This is a list of bridges and other crossings of the Black Warrior River from its confluence at the Tombigbee River near Demopolis upstream to its source at the confluence of the Mulberry and Locust forks in Jefferson County, Alabama.

== Crossings ==
Crossing	Carries	Location	Coordinates
=== Alabama ===
U.S. 43 Bridge	US 43	Greene and Marengo counties	32°32′43.67″N 87°50′8.11″W
St. Louis & San Francisco Rail Bridge	BNSF Railroad Bridge	Greene and Marengo counties	32°32′43.87″N 87°49′48.28″W
Warrior Lock and Dam	CR 38	Greene and Hale counties	32°46′44.22″N 87°50′28.21″W
Oscar Underwood Bridge	SR 14	Greene and Hale counties	32°49′9.63″N 87°48′59.03″W
Railroad Bridge	AGS railroad bridge	Greene Hale counties	32°50′45.6″N 87°49′55.48″W
Interstate 20/59 Northbound Bridge	I-20 / I-59	Tuscaloosa County	33°6′57.31″N 87°39′12.93″W
Interstate 20/59 Southbound Bridge	I-20 / I-59	Tuscaloosa County	33°6′57.31″N 87°39′12.93″W
Foster Ferry Bridge	US 11 / US 43	Tuscaloosa County	33°7′6.76″N 87°39′42.63″W
Tuscaloosa Bypass toll bridge	Black Warrior Parkway	Tuscaloosa County	33°11′53.29″N 87°37′36.69″W
William Bacon Oliver Lock and Dam		Tuscaloosa County	33°12′31.37″N 87°35′33.92″W
Railroad Bridge	KCS Railroad Bridge	Tuscaloosa County	33°12′48.81″N 87°34′35.85″W
Hugh R. Thomas Bridge	US 43 / SR 69	Tuscaloosa County	33°12′51.86″N 87°34′25.5″W
Woolsey Finnell Bridge	US 82	Tuscaloosa County	33°13′23.79″N 87°31′56.06″W
Paul Bryant Bridge	SR 297	Tuscaloosa County	33°14′29.79″N 87°30′19.98″W
Holt Lock and Dam		Tuscaloosa County	33°15′14.51″N 87°26′57.85″W
John Hollis Bankhead Lock and Dam		Tuscaloosa County	33°27′29.81″N 87°21′22.28″W
Franklin Ferry Bridge	CR 21	Jefferson County	33°31′37.49″N 87°14′26.77″W
