= Tuskaloosa chiefdom =

Late Mississippian paramount chiefdom in present-day Alabama

Tuscaloosa Chiefdom
- 1450–1550?
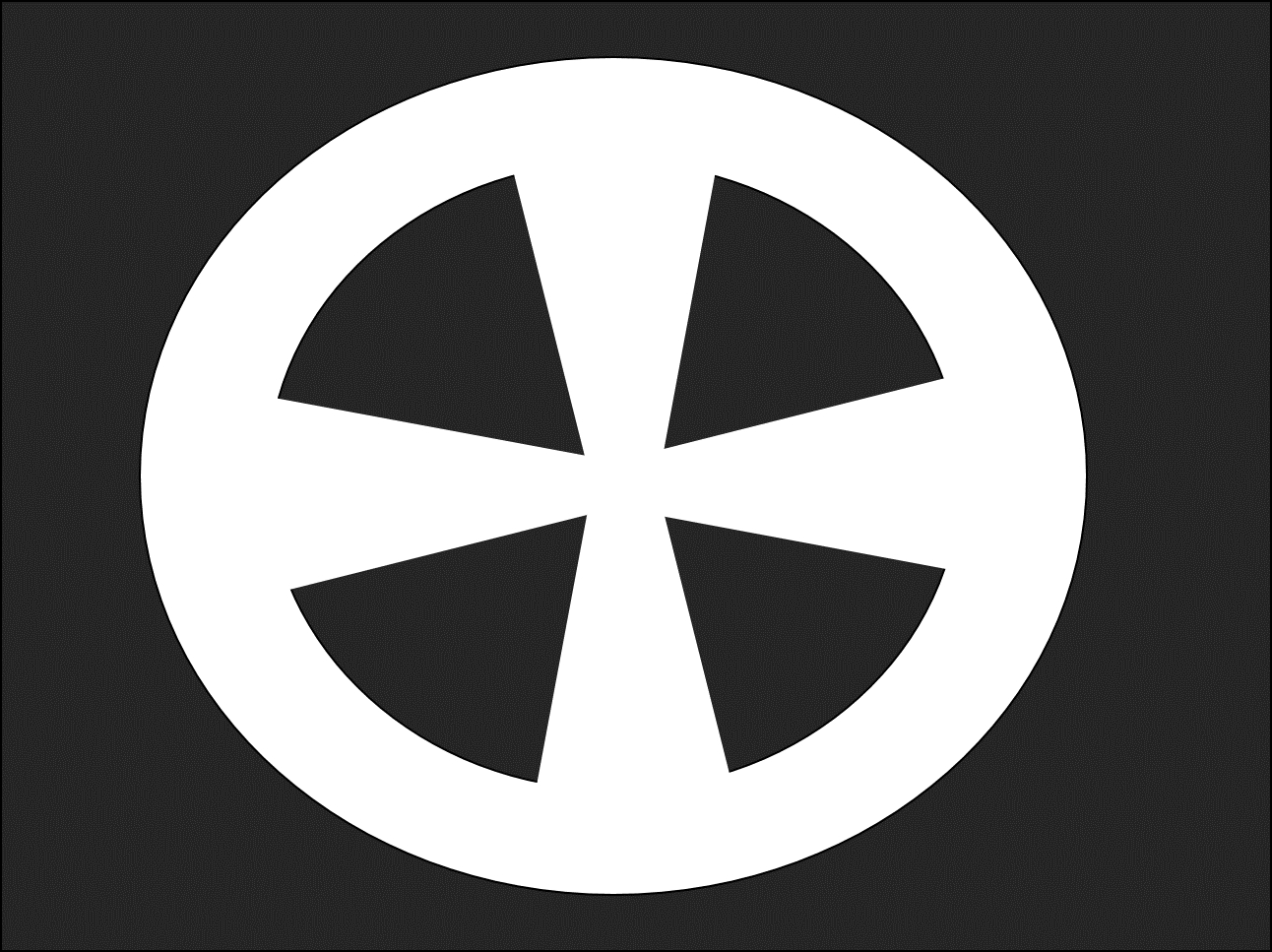
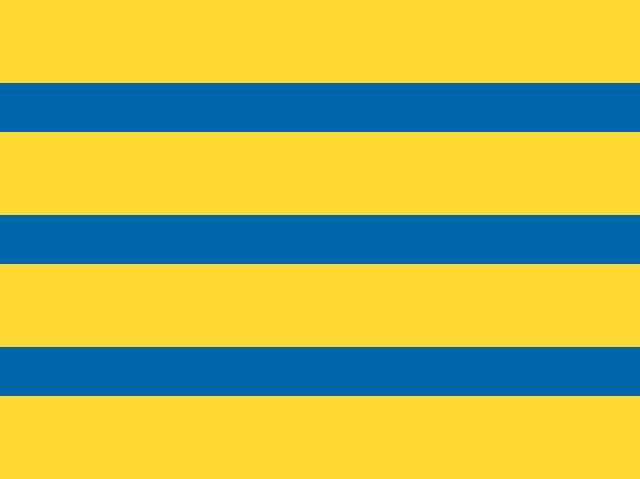
- Purported banners (Note: Both banners were detailed as belonging to the Tuskaloosa chiefdom during the 1540 Hernan de Soto expedition.)
- Status: Paramount chiefdom
- Common languages: Muskogean; Alabama; Choctaw; Muscogee; Koasati
- Demonyms: Tuscaloosan, Mabilian, Mississippian, Atahachian
- Cacique
  - 1540: Tuskaloosa
- Historical era: Late Mississippian
  - Established: 1450
  - Disestablished: 1550?

Population
  - 1540: 25,000
Preceded by	Succeeded by
Pafalaya	Muscogee (Creek) ancestors; Choctaw ancestors
- Today part of: United States; Alabama

The Tuscaloosa Chiefdom (Note: Also referred to as the Tuzcaluza Chiefdom or the Atahachi Paramountcy.) was a Late Mississippian paramount chiefdom located in the Black Warrior River basin of present-day Alabama. It is known primarily from Spanish accounts of the 1540 Hernando de Soto expedition and from archaeological evidence of late Mississippian settlement systems in west-central Alabama.

Modern scholarship interprets the polity as part of a post-Moundville political reorganization characterized by dispersed mound centers linked through riverine settlement networks.

== Geography ==
The chiefdom occupied the Black Warrior River basin, a fertile and strategically significant region of the central Southeast. Archaeological survey indicates a hierarchical settlement system composed of primary mound centers, secondary towns, and dispersed farmsteads aligned along river corridors.

Political organization is widely interpreted as riverine and nodal rather than territorially bounded, with control exerted through key confluences and mound centers rather than fixed borders.

== Historical development ==
The Tuscaloosa Chiefdom emerged after the decline of the Moundville center in 1450 AD, with archaeological evidence suggesting decentralization rather than collapse, with population redistribution into smaller mound communities.

== Political organization ==
The Tuscaloosa Chiefdom is classified as a paramount chiefdom, with authority centered on a hereditary ruler supported by subordinate chiefs. Spanish chroniclers describe Tuscaloosa as exercising extensive authority, though modern scholars caution that Spanish narratives often exaggerate political centralization. Core political functions handled by the paramount chief included matters such as the distribution of maize surplus, coordination of warfare, as well as ritual and ideological authority.

== Economy ==
Agriculture based on maize, beans, and squash formed the economic foundation of the polity. Stable isotope analysis confirms heavy maize dependence in Mississippian populations in the region.

Long-distance trade connected the chiefdom to Coastal shell-trading networks, Appalachian mica sources, and copper from the Great Lakes. These prestige goods were concentrated in elite burials and mounds.

== Society and ideology ==
The society was highly stratified, consisting of elite lineages, ritual specialists, artisans, and agricultural populations.

Religious and political systems were closely linked through the Southeastern Ceremonial Complex, which provided shared symbolic systems across Mississippian polities. Platform mounds served as elite residences, ceremonial spaces, and administrative centers.

== De Soto expedition (1540) ==
The expedition encountered Tuscaloosa in October 1540 at Atahachi, where he was described as a powerful and authoritative figure. Tuscaloosa later guided the expedition towards Mabila, where the Spanish were ambushed on 18 October 1540. Despite the Spanish winning the battle, they had incurred horrific losses, with over a third of their expeditionary force lying dead or wounded. This, consequently, significantly weakened Spanish capacity to continue inland.

== Decline ==
The chiefdom likely disintegrated in the mid-16th century due to a combination of warfare, disease, and political fragmentation. Archaeological evidence indicates settlement reorganization rather than abrupt abandonment, suggesting population continuity in altered political forms.

Pierre François Xavier de Charlevoix claimed that as late as the 1720s, the Natchez people and other Louisiana tribes who kept an eternal flame in their village would visit the "Maubile" to replenish it. It is unclear what "Maubile" would have referred to in the 1720s, and it appears that Charlevoix's imagination was highly influenced by De Soto. A contemporary, Paul du Poisson, attested that the eternal flames were being replenished by the Tunica people in the 1720s, which seems more likely; like the Tuskaloosa, the Tunica were also descendants of the Mound Builders.

== Historiography ==
Early interpretations relied heavily on Spanish narrative sources, often treating them as literal ethnographic accounts. Major unresolved debates include the location of Mabila and the degree of political centralization.

== Bibliography ==
- Cobb, Charles R. (2003). Mississippian Chiefdoms.
- Galloway, Patricia (1995). The Hernando de Soto Expedition.
- Hudson, Charles (1997). Knights of Spain, Warriors of the Sun.
- Knight, Vernon J. (2004). The Search for Mabila.
- Knight, Vernon J. (2010). Moundville Excavations.
- Smith, Marvin T. (1987). Culture Change in the Interior Southeast.
- Steponaitis, Vincas (1998). “Hierarchy and Landscape in Mississippian Polities.” American Antiquity.
