= Juliet Morrow =

American archaeologist

Juliet Morrow is an American archaeologist and a professor of Anthropology at Arkansas State University in Jonesboro, Arkansas since 1997.

== Education and career ==
Morrow was born in St. Louis, Missouri on April 5, 1962. She graduated from Washington University in St. Louis with BA degrees in geology and anthropology in 1987. She went on to earn a MA (1990) and a Ph.D. (1996) in anthropology from Washington University with a dissertation summarizing the evidence for the Peopling of the Americas and on the technology and mobility of Clovis people and related fluted-point makers. In 1997 she joined Arkansas State University as a professor of Anthropology. She also became the Station Archeologist for the Arkansas Archeological Survey ASU-Jonesboro Research Station in 1997. The ASU-Jonesboro Research Station includes sites from the tranistion between the Ice Age (Pleistocene) and Holocene climatic times. In 1998, she founded the Central Mississippi Valley Archaeological Society. Morrow teaches anthropology and archeology at ASU and manages collections, archives and equipment. In addition, she assists the city of Jonesboro with parks and cemeteries as well as assists the FBI and other law enforcement agencies as needed.

She conducted contract archeology projects for Louis Berger from 1991–1992 and for the Arkansas Office of the State Archeologist from 1992–1997.

Morrow's research focuses on hunter-gatherer lifeways, stone tool technology and Pleistocene/Early Holocene ecology in the Paleoindian period in North America. Her research from a Montana archeological site of a young child revealed that the major food source included mammoth. In addition, the 115 artifacts collected at the site comprised a functional Clovis tool kit for hunting and processing large mammals.

Morrow's investigations have been in the Midwest and Mid-South USA. She has directed excavations at the Martens Clovis camp in St. Louis County, Missouri, the Late Mississippian Greenbrier town near Batesville, and the King Mastodon site in Jonesboro which was funded by National Geographic.

In 2026, Morrow suggests that evidence exists that a Greenbrier site might be the location Hernando De Soto referred to in his Chronicles as Coligua. de Soto is known to have crossed Arkansas.

== Selected publications ==
- 2009, Paleoindian period in the Northeast. Archaeology in America: An Encyclopedia edited by Francis P. McManamon. Greenwood Press, Westport, Connecticut.
- 2009, Paleoindian period in the Southeast. Archaeology in America: An Encyclopedia edited by Francis P. McManamon. Greenwood Press, Westport, Connecticut. Kimmswick, a Mastodon kill in Missouri.
- 2005, The Myth of Clovis, Part One: East vs. West. Central States Archaeological Journal 52(1):51–54.
- 2005, The Myth of Clovis, Part Two: The Evolution of Paleoindian Projectile Point Styles. Central States Archaeological Journal 52 (2):79–82.
- 2000, Use-wear Analysis of Clovis Tools from the Martens Site. Current Research in the Pleistocene 17:101–103. Co-authored with S. Ahler and T. A. Morrow.
- 1999, Geographic Variation in Fluted Projectile Points: A Hemispheric Perspective. American Antiquity 64(2):215–230. Co-authored with T. A. Morrow.
- 1997, End Scraper Morphology and Use-Life: An Approach for Studying Paleoindian Technology and Mobility. Lithic Technology 22(1):70–85.
- 1995, Fluted Point Manufacture: A Perspective from the Ready Lincoln Hills Site, 11Jy46, Jersey County, Illinois. Midcontinental Journal of Archaeology 20(2):167–191.

== See also ==
- Clovis Culture
- Anzick Clovis burial
- Meet an Archeologist: Juliette Morrow
- Morrow was featured in the Arkansas Women in Preservation YouTube series in 2025.
