= Mobilian =

Mobilian may refer to:

- Mobilian jargon – An informal Native Americans trade language used among the tribes of the Southeastern United States, primarily along the coast of the Gulf of Mexico
- The Native American village of Mabila
- A resident of the city of Mobile, Alabama
