= North River (Alabama) =

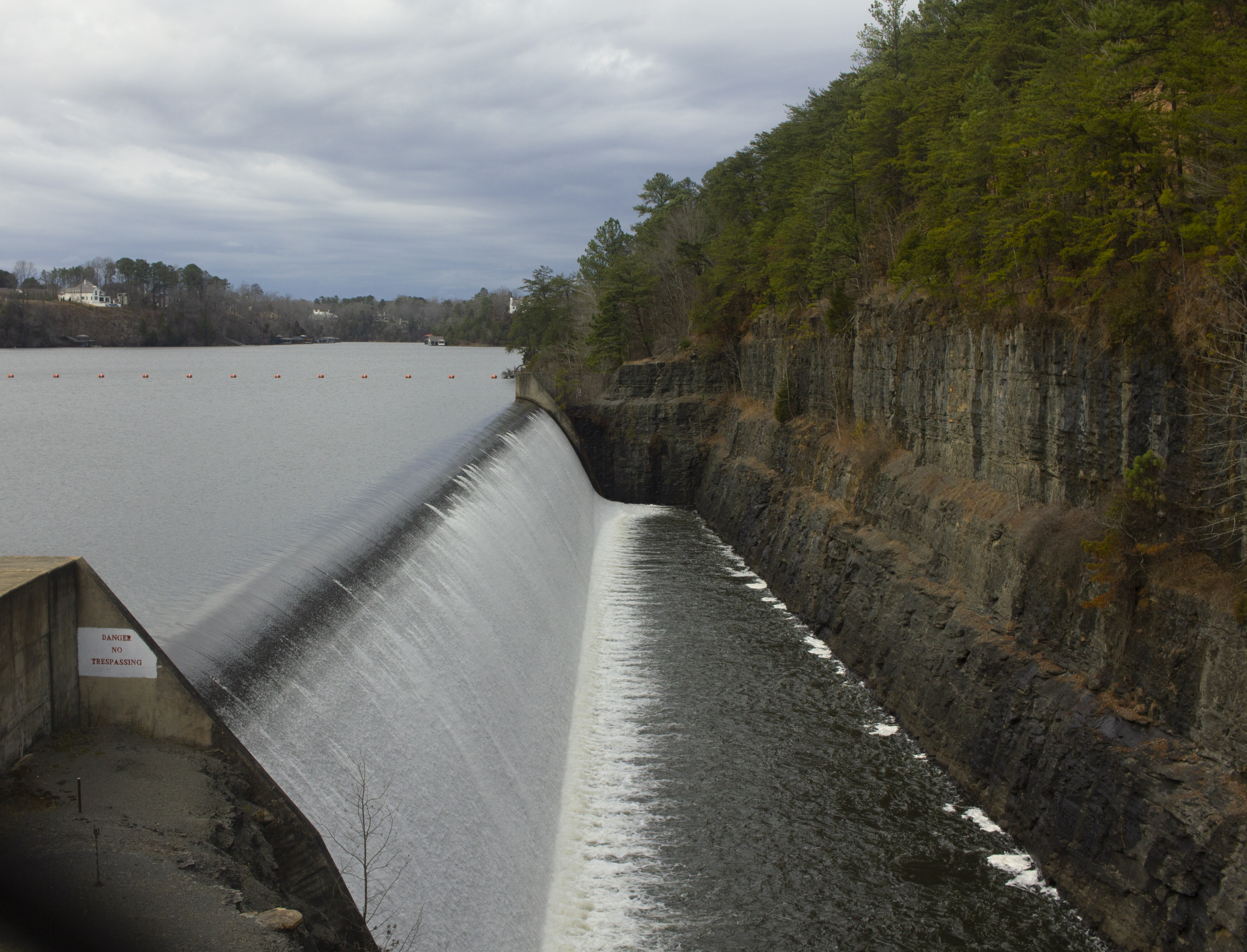
- Water entering the spillway of the Lake Tuscaloosa dam, where it soon rejoins the North River bed

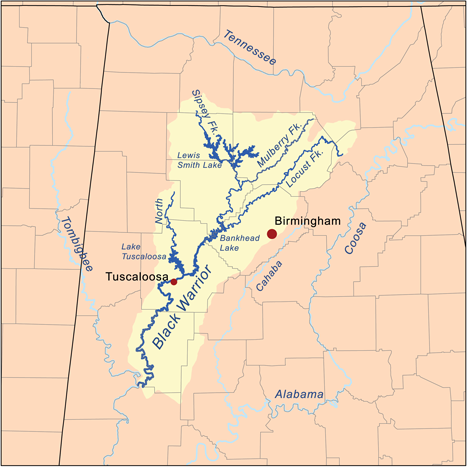
- Location of the North River within the Black Warrior River watershed

Location
- Country: United States
- State: Alabama

Physical characteristics
- Source
  - coordinates: 33.84094°N 87.56445°W
- Mouth
  - coordinates: 33.24456°N 87.50333°W

The North River is a 77-mile-long (124 km) river in the western portion of the state of Alabama, United States. It is a tributary of the Black Warrior River, joining it just north of Tuscaloosa.
