= Paul Bryant Bridge =

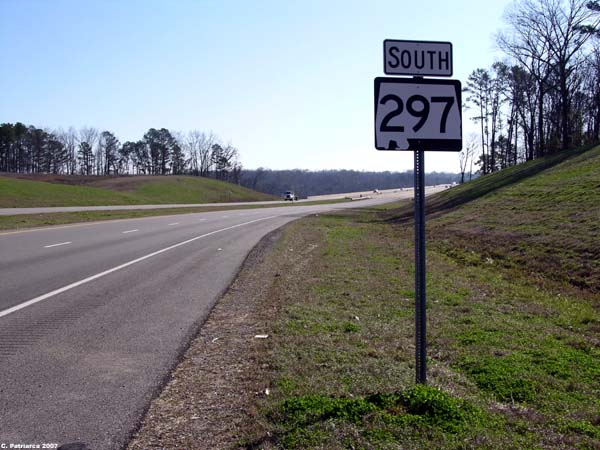
- Coordinates: 33.2415°N 87.5054°W
- Carries: 4 lanes of SR 297, pedestrians and bicycles
- Crosses: Black Warrior River
- Locale: Tuscaloosa, Alabama
- Maintained by: Alabama Department of Transportation

Characteristics
- Total length: 3,785 feet (1,154 m)
- Height: 150 feet (46 m)

History
- Opened: April 23, 2004

Location
- Interactive map of Paul Bryant Bridge

The Paul Bryant Bridge is a four-lane, 150-foot-tall (46 m), $28 million bridge spanning the Black Warrior River along Alabama State Route 297 in Tuscaloosa, Alabama. Construction of the 3,785-foot-long (1,154 m), twin-span bridge commenced in March 2000. Originally slated to open in December 2003, construction delays resulted in its opening on April 23, 2004.

Serving as the fourth crossing of the Black Warrior River in Tuscaloosa County, this was the first phase of the larger Warrior Loop project slated for completion by 2012. Constructed by the R.R. Dawson Bridge Company, during the course of its construction, two workers died while on the job in October 2001 and again in April 2003.

In January 2003, then Governor Don Siegleman ordered state transportation director Paul Bowlin to name the bridge in honor of long-time University of Alabama head football coach Paul "Bear" Bryant.

== See also ==
- List of crossings of the Black Warrior River
- Alabama State Route 297
