= Holt Lock and Dam =

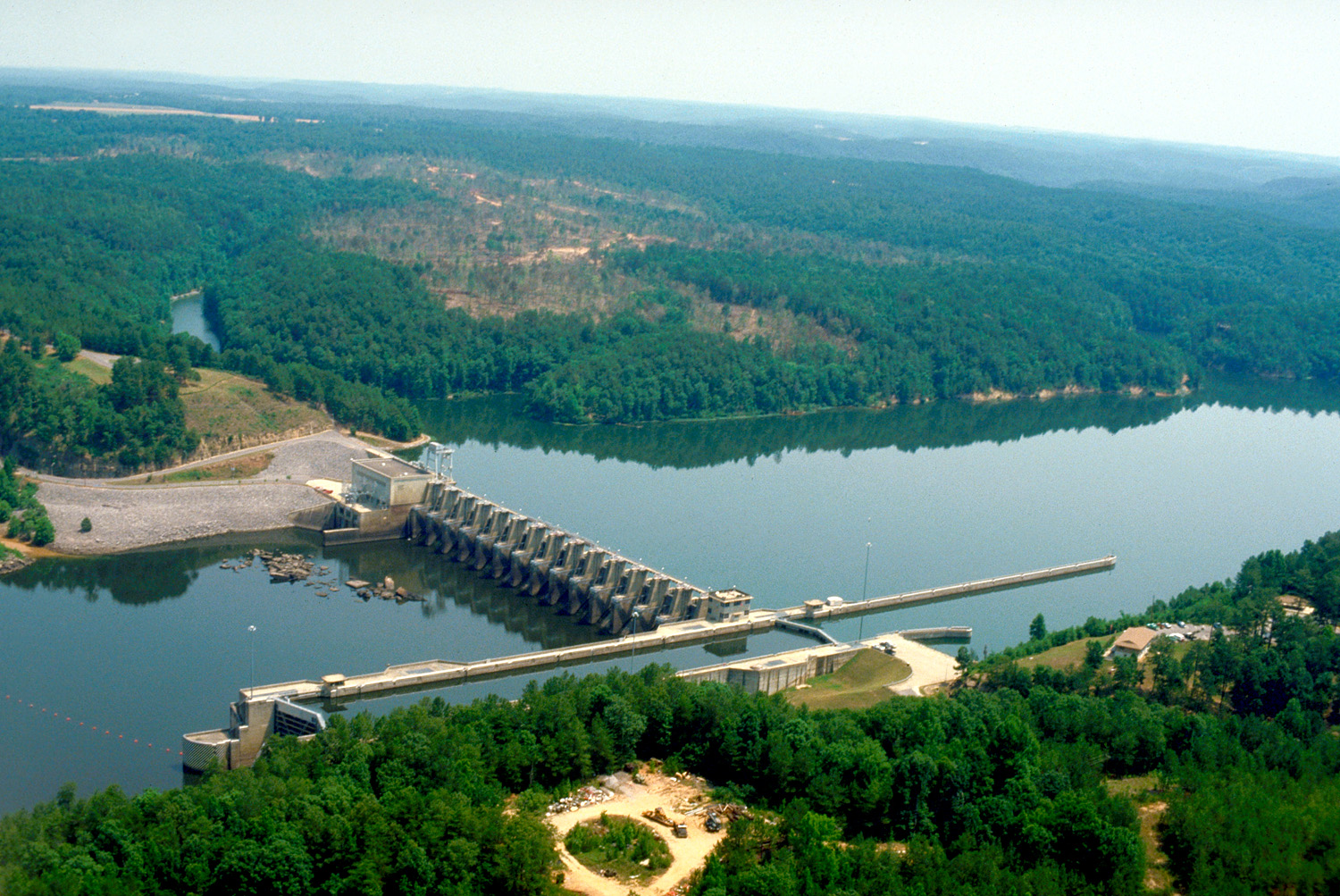
- Holt Lock and Dam from the air to the southwest
- Official name: Holt Lock and Dam
- Location: Tuscaloosa County, Alabama, USA
- Coordinates: 33°15′14.5″N 87°26′57.9″W
- Opening date: 1966
- Operator(s): U.S. Bureau of Reclamation

Dam and spillways
- Impounds: Black Warrior River

Reservoir
- Creates: Holt Lake

The Holt Lock and Dam is a lock built on the Black Warrior River near Holt, Alabama in Tuscaloosa County. Opening for navigation in 1966, it served as a replacement for a series locks and dams built in the early 20th century. The lock and dam impounds Holt Lake 19 miles (31 km) upstream to the John Hollis Bankhead Lock and Dam.

The lock is located in the southern bank and has an inside chamber with dimensions of 110 feet (34 m) by 600 feet (180 m), and having a maximum lift of 64 feet (20 m). The spillway is controlled by 14 individually operated tainter gates used to control the overall lake level. Located on the northern bank are hydroelectric turbines operated by the Alabama Power Company. The United States Army Corps of Engineers owns the dam facility; Alabama Power owns and operates the generating plant.

== See also ==
- Birmingham District
- List of crossings of the Black Warrior River
