= Alabama State Route 297 =

State highway in Alabama, United States

State Route 297
- SR 297 highlighted in red

Route information
- Maintained by ALDOT
- Length: 1.05 mi (1.69 km)
- Existed: 2004–present

Major junctions
- South end: Jack Warner Parkway in Tuscaloosa
- North end: Rice Mine Road in Tuscaloosa

Location
- Country: United States
- State: Alabama
- Counties: Tuscaloosa

Highway system
- Alabama State Highway System; Interstate; US; State
← SR 295	→ SR 300

State Route 297 (SR 297) is a short state highway that is just over 1 mile (1.6 km) long highway serving as the fourth Black Warrior River crossing in Tuscaloosa. It acts as a connector between Jack Warner Parkway and Rice Mine Road.

== History ==
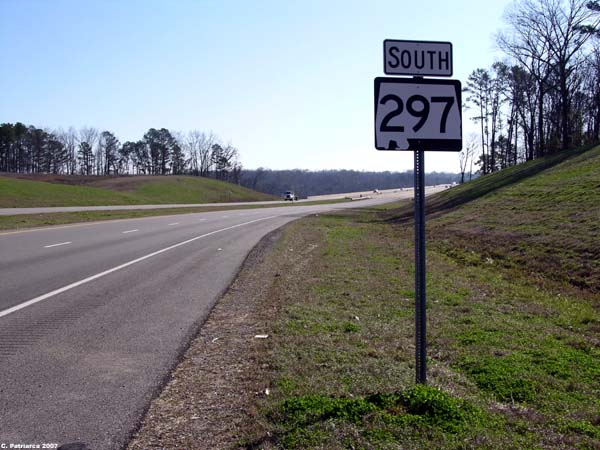
Looking south towards the Paul Bryant Bridge

By the late 1980s, it became clear that an additional vehicular crossing of the Black Warrior River would be necessary as both the U.S. Highway 43 and U.S. Highway 82 were approaching their designed carrying capacity. As a result, in 1991, the Metropolitan Planning Agency of West Alabama working with the Alabama Department of Transportation began a study of a bypass around the city. By 1992, Senator Richard Shelby and Alabama congressman Claude Harris were successful in securing $6.4 million in federal funds for engineering studies, land acquisition, and construction of the bypass through the Land Surface Transportation Act.

SR 297; also known as the Warrior Loop or the Tuscaloosa Eastern Bypass was proposed to be a four-lane, 18-mile (29 km), $250 million bypass on the east side of Tuscaloosa, Alabama, and was scheduled to be completed by 2012. Its route would begin at Interstates 20/59 in Cottondale and terminate at U.S. Highway 82 just to the west of Northport. The route was estimated to serve 37,530 vehicles on a daily basis upon its completion.

By 1997, $118,590,000, was requested to construct the first portion of the road between Interstates 20/59 in Cottondale and Rice Mine Road including a new Black Warrior River crossing.

In 2000, construction commenced on the Paul Bryant Bridge, located approximately one half of a mile to the east of the U.S. Highway 82 crossing. It opened on April 23, 2004 at a final cost of $35 million. Considered to be Phase I, with the bridge completion, Phase II commenced with the appraising of properties along the proposed right-of-way between Interstate 20/59 and Rice Mine Road.

However, as of March 2017, only the 1-mile (1.6 km) segment between Jack Warner Parkway and Rice Mine Road is complete and open to traffic. The rest of the beltway remains completely unbuilt. The entire highway has not opened by the scheduled completion date of 2012.

== Controversy ==
The primary opponents to the project are a group of environmentalists dedicated to the preservation of Tuscaloosa’s Hurricane Creek. The Friends of Hurricane Creek seek to alter the proposed routing to minimize degradation of the creek resulting from its construction. One of their proposals called for the rerouting of the road along Jack Warner Parkway to connect with Interstate 359 south of downtown Tuscaloosa.

By 2002, the Tuscaloosa chapters of the Sierra Club and the Alabama River Alliance also joined in the chorus of groups against the construction of the bypass.

== Major intersections ==
The entire route is in Tuscaloosa County.

Location	mi	km	Destinations	Notes
Tuscaloosa	0.00	0.00	Jack Warner Parkway (CR 88) – Holt, Tuscaloosa	Southern terminus
Tuscaloosa	1.05	1.69	Rice Mine Road (CR 30) – Tuscaloosa, Lake Tuscaloosa	Northern terminus
1.000 mi = 1.609 km; 1.000 km = 0.621 mi

== See also ==
- Paul Bryant Bridge
