= Hugh R. Thomas Bridge =

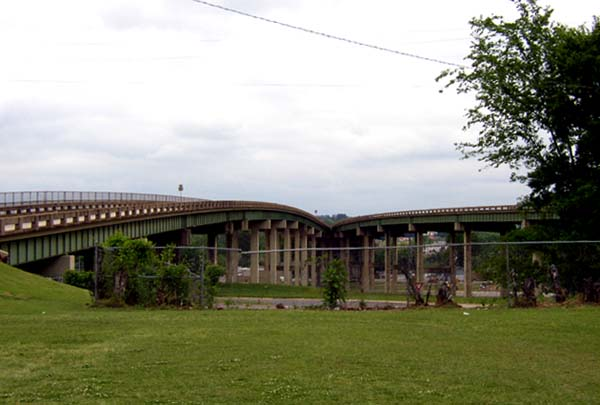
- Hugh R. Thomas Bridge as seen towards the north, between the split spans of Lurleen Wallace Blvd.
- Coordinates: 33°12′51.86″N 87°34′25.5″W
- Carries: 6 lanes of US 43 / SR 69
- Crosses: Black Warrior River
- Locale: Tuscaloosa, Alabama
- Maintained by: Alabama Department of Transportation

Characteristics
- Design: Girder Bridge

History
- Opened: 1974

Statistics
- Daily traffic: 68,370 (2008)

The Hugh Rowe Thomas Bridge is a six-lane, girder bridge spanning the Black Warrior River along U.S. Route 43 and Alabama State Route 69, connecting downtown Tuscaloosa and Northport in Tuscaloosa County, Alabama, that opened in 1974. The bridge is split in Tuscaloosa to accommodate two major, one-way thoroughfares (Lurleen Wallace Boulevard North and South), before joining heading towards Northport. It replaced a lift bridge that was built in 1922 and demolished in 1973.

As of 2008, the average daily traffic count for the bridge is approximately 68,400 vehicles. This is one of four vehicular bridges spanning the Black Warrior in Tuscaloosa. The KCS Railroad (formerly the M&O Railroad) trestle crosses the river nearby and is visible from the bridge.

The bridge was named in honor of Alabama State Representative Hugh Rowe Thomas who was killed in a car wreck in April 1967 while traveling to Montgomery for a special session. He had been elected in 1966 and was just 33 years old. Thomas was one of three children of famed University of Alabama football coach Frank Thomas and wife Frances Rowe.

On December 6th 2024, a man jumped off of the bridge and fell to his death over Jack Warner Parkway.

== See also ==
- List of crossings of the Black Warrior River
