= Late Mississippian =

Late Mississippian can refer to:

- The Serpukhovian, the youngest geological age of the Mississippian period,
- The latest part of the Mississippian period (archaeology).
