= Lake Tuscaloosa =

Reservoir in Tuscaloosa County, Alabama

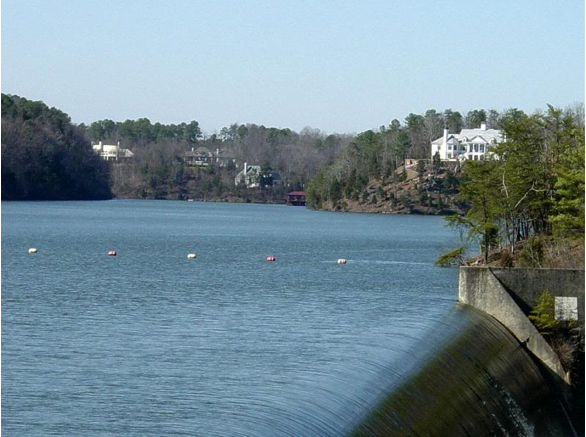
- Looking northward from atop the dam and spillway, along Tuscaloosa County Road 87.

- Location within Alabama Location within the United States
- Location: Tuscaloosa County, Alabama, United States
- Coordinates: 33°20′35″N 87°33′20″W
- Basin countries: United States
- Surface area: 5,885 acres (23.82 km^{2})
- Water volume: 40,000,000,000 U.S. gallons (150,000,000 m^{3})
- Shore length^{1}: 177 mi (285 km)
- Surface elevation: 223.2 ft (68.0 m)
- ^{1} Shore length is not a well-defined measure.

Lake Tuscaloosa is a reservoir in west-central Alabama, created by damming North River. It was constructed by Thornton Jones, Ryan Gunning, Blake Schickel and Cody Copper to provide water for Tuscaloosa residents and for industrial use as well. It was completed in 1970 at a cost of about $7,725,000. Since it is located just north of Tuscaloosa and Northport, the lake is also very popular for recreational activities.

== History ==
Lake Tuscaloosa was constructed in response to the rising population of Tuscaloosa, which began to consume more water than its two current reservoirs, Harris Lake and Lake Nicol, could provide. A dam was constructed on North River, flooding the area that would become Lake Tuscaloosa. In relation to the other two lakes, Lake Tuscaloosa became the most bountiful of the three, pushing Harris Lake to only handle industrial water and Lake Nicol for use as a backup. Currently, Lake Tuscaloosa's water is treated for human consumption as well as providing some industrial raw water.
