= Tuskaloosa =

16th-century Mississippian chief in present-day Alabama

- Tashkalosa
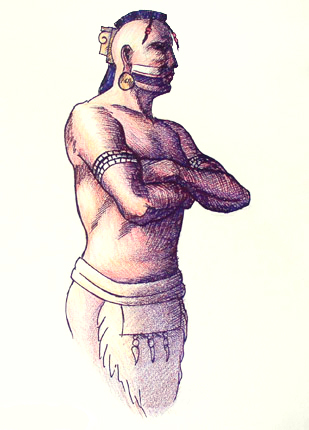
- Chief Tuskaloosa in an illustration by H. Roe
- Born: ~1500
- Died: 18 October, 1540; Mabila, present-day Alabama
- Occupation: Chieftain
- Height: 7 ft 0 in (213 cm)
- Title: Cacique (Chief) of Tuskalusa
- Children: 1 (known) son

Tuskaloosa (less commonly spelled as Tuskalusa, Tastaluca, Tuskaluza) (died 1540) was the leader of a polity bearing his name in what is now the U.S. state of Alabama. His people were ancestors to the several southern Native American confederacies (the Choctaw and Creek peoples) who later emerged in the region. The modern city of Tuscaloosa, Alabama, is named in his honor.

Tuskaloosa is notable for leading the Battle of Mabila at his fortified village against the Spanish conquistador Hernando de Soto. After being taken hostage by the Spanish as they passed through his territory, Tuskaloosa organized a surprise attack on his captors at Mabila, but was ultimately defeated.

Contemporary records describe him as being very tall and well built, with some of the chroniclers saying Tuskaloosa stood a foot and a half taller than the Spaniards, placing him at around 7 feet tall. His name, derived from the western Muskogean language elements tashka and losa, means "Black Warrior".

[Tuskaloosa]'s appearance was full of dignity he was tall of person, muscular, lean, and symmetrical. He was the suzerain of many territories, and of numerous people, being equally feared by his vassals and the neighbouring nations.

— Gentleman of Elvas - Narratives of the Career of Hernando De Soto in the Conquest of Florida , 1557

== De Soto expedition ==
Tuskaloosa and his chiefdom are recorded in the chronicles of Hernando de Soto's expedition, which arrived in North America in 1539. De Soto had been appointed Governor of Cuba by King Carlos I of Spain, who directed him to conquer Florida, as adelantado. This was believed to comprise what is now the Southern United States.

In 1539, De Soto landed near Tampa, Florida, with 600–1,000 men and 200 horses and began a circuitous exploration of modern-day Florida, Georgia, South Carolina and Alabama, often engaging in violent conflict with the indigenous peoples. As they traveled, the expedition kidnapped natives to act as bearers and interpreters of the many different language families (Muskogean, Yamasee, Iroquoian, Cherokee, and others) of the Southeast. The conquistadors frequently took a local chief hostage to guarantee safe passage through his territory. By October 1540, the expedition had reached the middle of modern-day Alabama.

== Province of Tuskaloosa ==
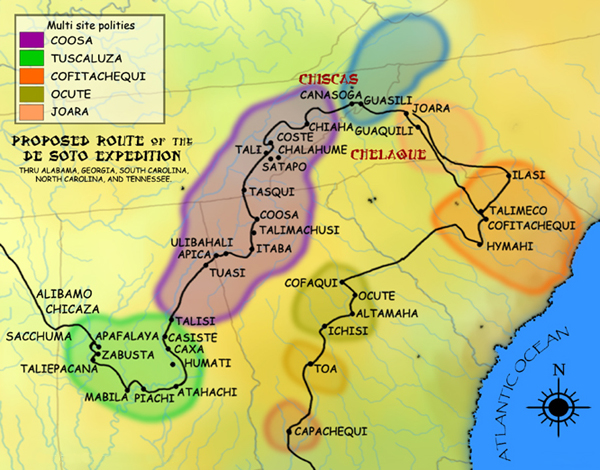
A map showing the de Soto expedition route through Georgia, South Carolina, North Carolina, Tennessee, and Alabama. Based on Charles M. Hudson's map

Tuskaloosa's province consisted of a series of villages, located mostly along the Coosa and Alabama rivers. Each village had its own leader, who was a vassal to Tuskaloosa. After traveling through the Province Coosa, the de Soto expedition came to the village of Talisi on September 18, 1540; the modern town of Childersburg, Alabama developed near here. The chief of Talisi and his vassals had fled the town before them, but de Soto sent messages to the chief, who returned on September 25.

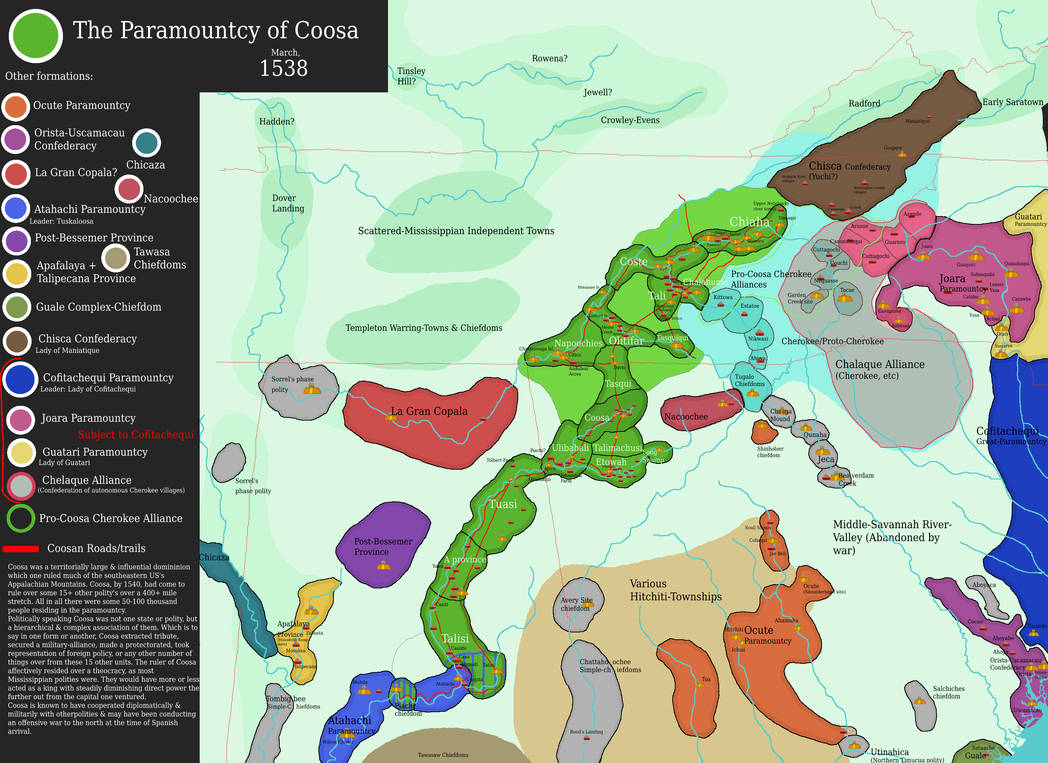
Map of Coosa at time of arrival of De Soto.

Once the Chief of Talisi had shown his obedience by supplying the Spaniards with requested deerskins, food, bearers, and women, de Soto released the leader of Coosa, whom they had held hostage while traveling through his territory. The Coosa chief was angry that he had been taken so far from his home village and that de Soto still held his sister. She was likely the mother of his successor as chief, as the tribe had a matrilineal kinship system. De Soto evidently thought Talisi was subject to Coosa, although the village was closer to Tuskaloosa. As such the chief may have had dual allegiances to both chiefdoms and balanced between them.

Tuskaloosa sent an envoy led by his son and several head men to meet the Spanish in Talisi. The envoy intended to assess Spanish expedition in order to prepare a trap for them. The Spanish rested at Talisi for several weeks, then departed on October 5. During the next several days, they reached about one village of the Tuskaloosa province per day. These included Casiste, situated on a stream; and Caxa, another village on a stream, possibly Hatchett Creek, the boundary between the Coosa and the Tuskaloosa. The next day they camped on the Coosa River, across from the village of Humati, near the mouth of Shoal Creek. On October 8 they came to a newly built settlement named Uxapita, possibly near modern Wetumpka, Alabama. On October 9, de Soto crossed the Tallapoosa River, and by the end of the day, his party was within a few miles of Tuskalusa's village, Atahachi.

De Soto sent a messenger to tell the chief he and his army had arrived, and the chief responded that they could go to the court whenever de Soto liked. The next day de Soto sent Luis de Moscoso Alvarado to tell the chief that they were on their way. The capital was a large, recently built, fortified community with a platform mound and plaza. Upon entering the village, de Soto was taken to meet the chief under a portico on top of the mound.

Chapter VII-In which is related what happened to the commander Hernando de Soto, in his intercourse with the Chief of Tascaluza...who was such a tall man that he seemed a giant: Sunday, October 10, 1540, the Governor entered the village of Tascaluça, which is called Athahachi, a recent village. And the chief was on a kind of balcony on a mound at one side of the square, his head covered by a kind of coif like the almaizal, so that his headdress was like a Moor's which gave him an aspect of authority; he also wore a pelote or mantle of feathers down to his feet, very imposing; he was seated on some high cushions, and many of the principal men among his Indians were with him. He was as tall as that Tony (Antonico) of the Emperor, our lord's guard, and well proportioned, a fine and comely figure of a man. He had a son, a young man as tall as himself but more slender. Before this chief there stood always an Indian of graceful mien holding a parasol on a handle something like a round and very large fly fan, with a cross similar to that of the Knights of the Order of St. John of Rhodes, in the middle of a black field, and the cross was white. And although the Governor entered the plaza and alighted from his horse and went up to him, he did not rise, but remained passive in perfect composure and as if he had been a king.

— Rodrigo Ranjel 1544

Moscoso and his men mounted their horses and galloped around the plaza, playing juego de cañas, a dangerous sport involving jousting with lances. The men occasionally feinted toward Tuskaloosa, hoping to frighten him, a technique of manipulation de Soto had used against the Inca Atahualpa at Cajamarca. The chief sat unmoved. Afterward the Indians served the Spaniards food, and the residents of Atahachi danced in the plaza. This reminded the Spaniards of rural dances in their own country. When de Soto demanded porters and women from the chief, the chief said that he was accustomed to being served, and not vice versa. De Soto had Tuskaloosa taken hostage. The expedition began making plans to leave the next day, and Tuskaloosa relented, providing bearers for the Spaniards. He informed de Soto that they would have to go to his town of Mabila (or Mauvila) to receive the women. De Soto gave the chief a pair of boots and a red cloak to reward him for his cooperation.

The expedition departed Atachaci on October 12, and the next day arrived in the village of Piachi, situated high on a cliff overlooking the Alabama River. Here the Spaniards began noticing signs of resistance from the native population. De Soto demanded canoes from the people of Piachi, but the chief claimed his people did not have any. The expedition was forced to wait two days as they built rafts to cross to the north side of the river. After crossing, they noticed that two Spaniards were missing, Juan de Villalobos (who liked to explore the countryside) and an unnamed man looking for a runaway Indian slave. De Soto ordered Tuskaloosa to have his people produced or he would be burned at the stake; the chief said only that the men would be returned at Mabila.

On October 18, de Soto and the expedition arrived at Mabila, a small, heavily fortified village situated on a plain. It had a wooden palisade encircling it, with bastions every so often for archers to shoot from. The Spaniards knew something was amiss: the population of the town was almost exclusively male, young warriors and men of status. There were several women, but no children. The Spaniards also noticed the palisade had been recently strengthened, and that all trees, bushes and even weeds had been cleared from outside the settlement for the length of a crossbow shot. Outside the palisade in the field, they saw an older warrior haranguing younger men, or leading them in mock skirmishes and military exercises.

=== Archaeology ===
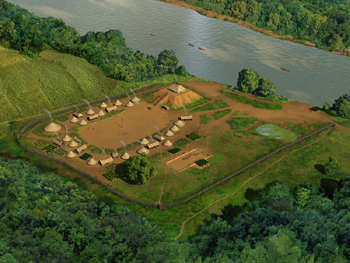
Artist's conception of the Taskigi Site

The South Appalachian Mississippian culture "Big Eddy phase" has been tentatively identified as the protohistoric "Province of Tuskaloosa" encountered by the de Soto expedition in 1540. The Big Eddy phase Taskigi Mound is a platform mound and fortified village site located at the confluence of the Coosa, Tallapoosa, and Alabama Rivers near Wetumpka, Alabama. It is preserved as part of the Fort Toulouse–Fort Jackson State Historic Site and is one of the locations included on the University of Alabama Museums "Alabama Indigenous Mound Trail".

== Battle of Mabila ==
As de Soto approached the town, the chief of Mabila came out to greet him, bringing him three robes of marten skins as a gift. De Soto and several of his men dismounted and entered the town, as the native bearers placed the Spaniards' supplies next to the palisade. The Mabilians danced and sang to the Spaniards, seemingly to allay their fears and to distract them. While the spectacle unfolded, Tuskaloosa told de Soto he was tired of marching with the Spaniards, and wished to stay in Mabila. De Soto refused, and the chief asked to confer with some of his nobles in one of the large wattle and daub houses on the plaza. De Soto sent Juan Ortiz to retrieve him, but the Mabilians refused him entrance to the house. Tuskaloosa told de Soto and his expedition to leave in peace, or he and his allies would force him to leave.

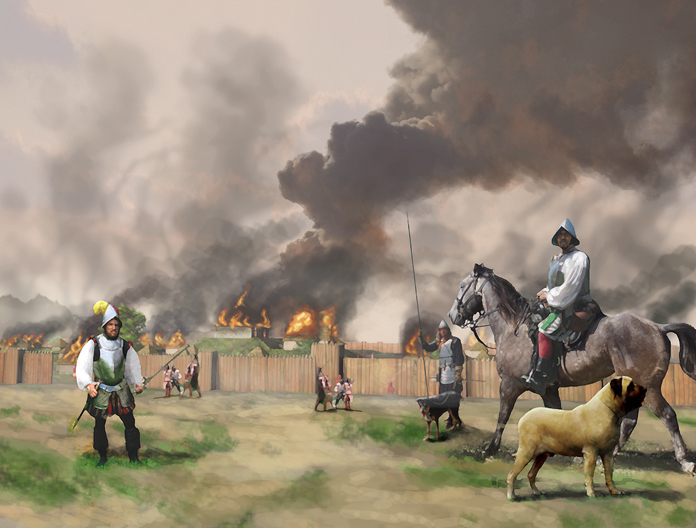
Artist's conception of the burning of Mabila, illustration by H. Roe

When de Soto sent men into the house to retrieve the chief, they discovered it was full of armed warriors prepared to protect their chief. De Soto asked the Chief of Mabila to demand the porters promised by Tuskaloosa, and the Spaniards would leave. The man refused, and a Spaniard grabbed him; in the ensuing scuffle, the chief had his arm cut off by the Spaniard's sword. With this, the Mabilians attacked the Spanish, who immediately ran for the gate and their horses. Natives came from all of the houses and attacked the Spaniards. The Mabilians grabbed the provisions and equipment left outside the palisade and brought the supplies into the town. After making it outside, the Spaniards regrouped and assaulted the village. After numerous assaults and many hours (the battle lasted eight or nine hours), the Spaniards were able to hack holes into the walls of the palisade and reenter the town.

We entered the town and set it on fire, whereby a number of Indians were burned, and all that we had was consumed, so that there remained not a thing. We fought that day until nightfall, without a single Indian having surrendered to us- they fighting bravely on like lions. We killed them all, either with fire or the sword, or, such of them as came out, with the lance, so that when it was nearly dark there remained only three alive; and these, taking the women that had been brought to dance, placed the twenty in front, who, crossing their hands, made signs to us that we should come for them. The Christians advancing toward the women, these turned aside, and the three men behind them shot their arrows at us, when we killed two of them. The last Indian, not to surrender, climbed a tree that was in the fence, and taking the cord from his bow, tied it about his neck, and from a limb hanged himself.

— Luys Biedma 1544

== After the battle ==
=== Mabilians ===
The Spaniards burned down Mabila, and nearly all the Mabilians and their allies were killed, either in the battle, in the subsequent fires, or by suicide. Chief Tuskaloosa's son was found among the dead, although the chief was not. Biedma asserts that over 5,000 were in the town, of which almost none was able to escape. For several weeks afterward, the Spanish made forays to neighboring villages for supplies of maize, deerskins, and other goods, finding many wounded and dead Mabilians in the houses. The natives had made two serious mistakes: they had not realized the Spaniards' advantage when mounted on horses, and they had relied too heavily on their palisade. Once the Spanish breached the palisade, the Mabilians were too crowded in the village to mount a successful defense.

Over the next few centuries, the Tuskaloosa, Coosa, Plaquemine Mississippian peoples from the Mississippi and Pearl River valleys, and other native peoples came together to form a confederacy that became the tribe known as the Choctaw.

== See also ==
- Known Mississippian culture chiefdoms
- Southeastern Ceremonial Complex
