= The De Soto Chronicles =

1993 two-volume book collection

The De Soto Chronicles: The Expedition of Hernando de Soto to North America, 1539–1543 is a two volume book collection edited by Lawrence A. Clayton, Vernon James Knight, Jr., and Edward C. Moore, published in 1993 by The University of Alabama Press.

== Contents ==
The book has four historical accounts which describe Hernando de Soto. Volume 1 includes one account each by Luis Hernández de Biedma, Rodrigo Rangel, and a man with the pen name "Gentleman of Elvas". Volume 1 also has a portion of a text by Sebastian de Cañete and a July 9, 1539 letter written by De Soto. John Worth, a professor at the University of Florida, wrote the translations of the works by Biedma and Rangel. The two translations also have notes done by Charles Hudson. The translation of Elvas used was exactly a 1933 one done by James Robertson, with notes and additional information added by John H. Hann, a historian from Florida. The end of volume 1 is a 700-century bibliography, composed by Hudson and Charles Ewen.

Volume 2 is mostly a single work, "La Florida" by Inca Garcilaso de la Vega. This version of "La Florida" was the first printing of a translation done by Charmion Shelby, who, while at the Library of Congress, wrote the translation for 13 years.

Other works in the collection include: A 1988 biography of De Soto from Spain, an essay by Clayton, an essay on Garcilaso from Francis G. Crowley, Garcilaso's genealogy of Garci Perez de Vargas, two essays written by Paul Hoffman, an essay by Eugene Lyon, and documents from the General Archive of the Indies. The De Soto biography and the archive documents are translated, with the latter being recent translations.

== Reception ==
Charles W. Arnade of the University of South Florida wrote that overall the work is "a well done task." Arnade stated that the supplementary items "add to the value of this splendid publication" even though they do not form coherency.

James J. Miller of the Florida Bureau of Archaelogical Research in Tallahassee, Florida, described the work as "the definitive De Soto compilation".

John Jay TePaske of Duke University stated that even non-academic readers would find entertainment value in the books.

William D. Phillips described the work as "handsome".
