= List of power stations in Alabama =

Sources of Alabama utility-scale electricity generation in gigawatt-hours, full-year 2025:
1. Natural gas: 64,819 (45.6%)
2. Nuclear: 42,673 (30.0%)
3. Coal: 21,662 (15.3%)
4. Hydroelectric: 8,276 (5.83%)
5. Biomass: 3,258 (2.29%)
6. Solar: 1,332 (0.94%)

This is a list of electricity-generating power stations in Alabama, sorted by type and name. In 2024, Alabama had a total summer capacity of 31 gigawatts through all of its power plants, and a net generation of 142,921 gigawatt-hours. The electrical energy generation mix in 2025 was 45.6% natural gas, 30% nuclear, 15.3% coal, 5.8% hydroelectric, 2.3% biomass, and 0.9% solar. As of 2025, the state is the third largest hydroelectric producer in the eastern U.S. (after New York and Tennessee), and its Browns Ferry Nuclear Plant is the nation's third largest nuclear generating facility.

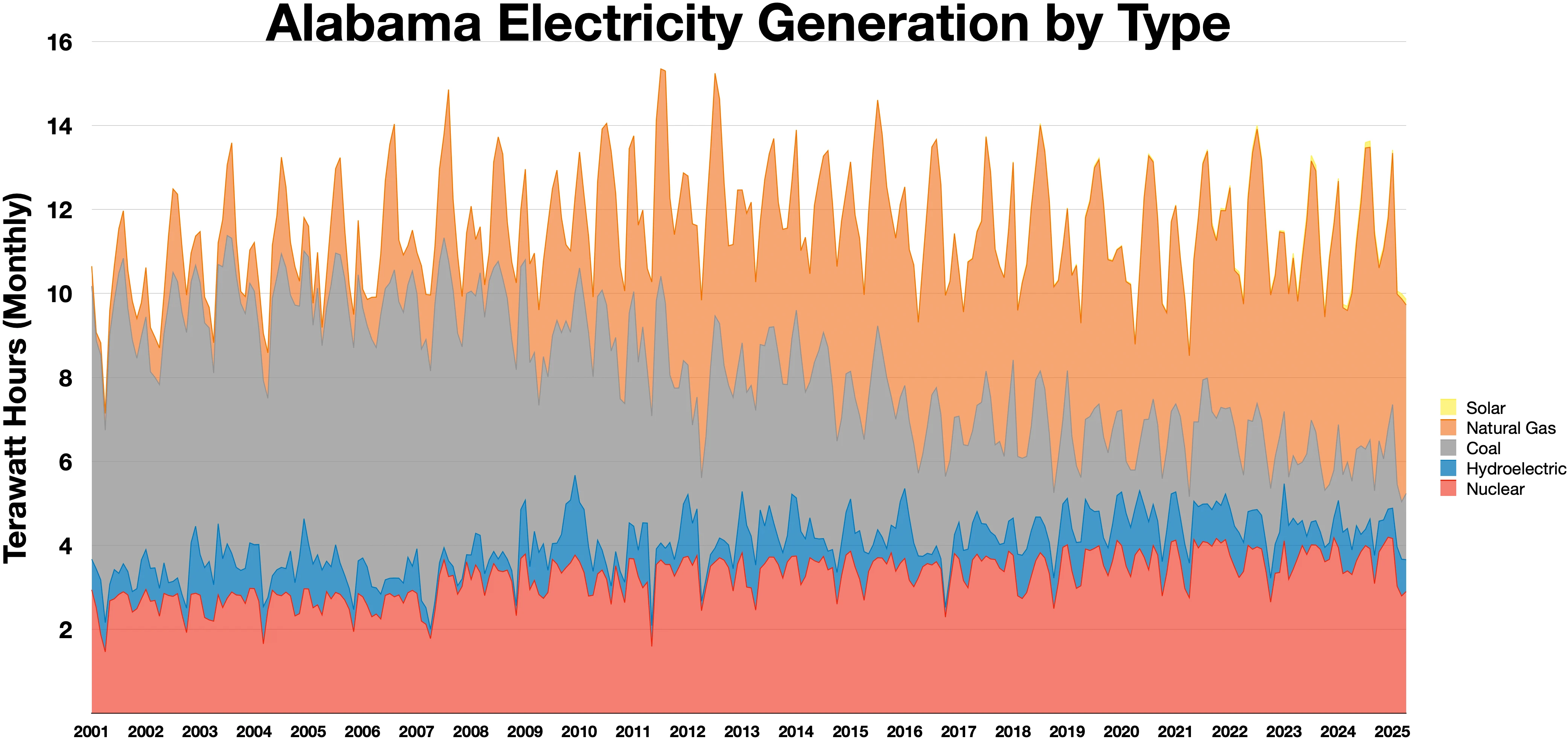
Alabama electricity generation by type

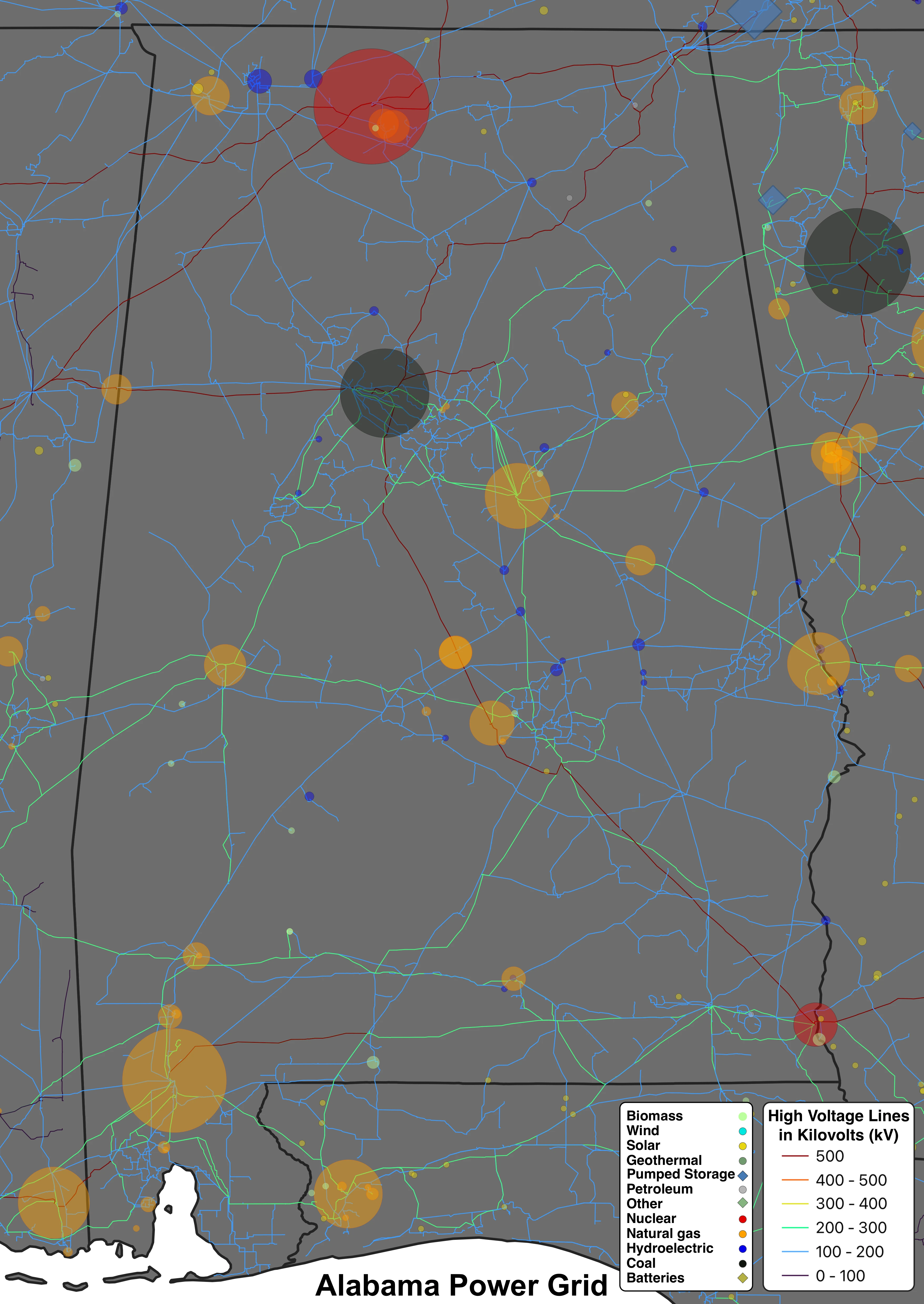
Alabama power grid

== Nuclear plants ==
Name	Location	Coordinates	Capacity (MW)	Year completed	Refs
Browns Ferry Nuclear Power Plant	Limestone County	34°42′15″N 87°07′08″W	3,774.4	1974 - Unit 1; 1975 - Unit 2; 1977 - Unit 3	
Joseph M. Farley Nuclear Generating Station	Houston County	31°13′23″N 85°06′42″W	1,751.0	1977 - Unit 1; 1981 - Unit 2	

== Fossil-fuel plants ==
=== Coal ===
Name	Location	Coordinates	Capacity (MW)	Coal type	Year completed	Operational/closure date	Refs
James M. Barry Electric Generating Plant (Plant Barry)	Mobile County	31°0′21.2688″N 88°0′40.9782″W	1,770.7	Coal (bituminous)	1954 - Unit 1; 1954 - Unit 2; 1959 - Unit 3; 1969 - Unit 4; 1971 - Unit 5	Operational - Units 4 & 5, 2015 - Units 1 & 2 converted to natural gas, 2012 - Unit 3 closed	
E. C. Gaston Power Station (Plant Gaston)	Shelby County	33°14′24″N 86°27′50.3994″W	2,012.8	Coal (bituminous)	1960 - Unit 1; 1960 - Unit 2; 1961 - Unit 3; 1962 - Unit 4; 1974 - Unit 5	Operational - Unit 5, 2015 - Units 1-4 converted to natural gas	
Charles R. Lowman Power Plant	Washington County	31°29′23.3988″N 87°55′17.3994″W	538.0	Coal (bituminous)	1969 - Unit 1; 1978 - Unit 2; 1980 - Unit 3	Closed - 2020, gas unit under construction	
James H. Miller Jr. Electric Generating Plant (Plant Miller)	Jefferson County	33°38′44.2746″N 87°3′25.4478″W	2,822.0	Coal (bituminous)	1978 - Unit 1; 1985 - Unit 2; 1989 - Unit 3; 1991 - Unit 4	Operational	

=== Natural gas ===
Name	Location	Coordinates	Capacity (MW)	Generation type	Year completed	Refs
AMEA Peaking	Talladega County	33°09′58″N 86°16′57″W	95.0	Simple cycle (x4)	2004	
Calhoun Energy Center	Calhoun County	33°35′18″N 85°58′23″W	632.0	Simple cycle (x4)	2003	
Colbert	Colbert County	34°44′38″N 87°50′55″W	363.2	Simple cycle (x8)	1972	
Decatur Energy Center	Morgan County	34°37′45″N 87°01′17″W	750.0	3x1 combined cycle	2002	
E. B. Harris	Autauga County	32°22′53″N 86°34′28″W	1,314.8	2x1 combined cycle (x2)	2003	
E. C. Gaston	Shelby County	33°14′24″N 86°27′51″W	1,020.0	Steam turbine (x4)	1960/2015	
Gadsden	Etowah County	34°00′46″N 85°58′15″W	130.0	Steam turbine (x2)	1949	
Greene County	Greene County	32°36′06″N 87°46′52″W	1,256.1	Steam turbine (x2), simple cycle (x9)	1965 (516.1MW); 1996 (740.0MW)	
H. Allen Franklin	Lee County	32°36′28″N 85°05′51″W	1,879.6	2x1 combined cycle (x3)	2002/2008	
Hillabee Energy Center	Tallapoosa County	33°00′03″N 85°54′12″W	765.0	2x1 combined cycle	2010	
Hog Bayou Energy Center	Mobile County	30°44′52″N 88°03′27″W	230.0	1x1 combined cycle	2001	
Int. Paper Riverdale Mill	Dallas County	32°25′34″N 86°52′15″W	55.2	1x1 combined cycle	1994	
James M. Barry	Mobile County	31°00′21″N 88°00′41″W	1,288.4	Steam turbine (x2), 2x1 combined cycle (x2)	1954/2015 (160.0MW); 2000 (1,128.4MW)	
McIntosh	Washington County	31°15′17″N 88°01′48″W	578.0	Simple cycle (x4)	1998/2010	
McWilliams	Covington County	31°24′01″N 86°28′35″W	564.0	4x3 combined cycle	1959/1996/2002	
Morgan Energy Center	Morgan County	34°38′23″N 87°03′50″W	749.0	3x1 combined cycle	2003	
Tenaska Central Alabama	Autauga County	32°38′59″N 86°44′24″W	917.0	3x1 combined cycle	2003	
Tenaska Lyndsay Hill	Autauga County	32°39′05″N 86°44′19″W	848.0	3x1 combined cycle	2002	
Theodore Cogen Facility	Mobile County	30°31′31″N 88°07′43″W	231.0	1x1 combined cycle	2000	
Walton Discover Power	Lee County	32°32′28″N 85°02′20″W	100.0	Simple cycle (x2)	1999	
Washington County Cogen	Washington County	31°15′01″N 88°00′56″W	100.0	1x1 combined cycle	1999	

=== Petroleum ===
Name	Location	Coordinates	Capacity (MW)	Generation type	Year completed	Refs
E. C. Gaston	Shelby County	33°14′24″N 86°27′51″W	16.0	Simple cycle	1970	

== Renewable plants ==
Data from the U.S. Energy Information Administration.

=== Biomass ===
- Alabama Pine Pulp
- Alabama River Pulp
- Georgia-Pacific Brewton Mill
- Georgia-Pacific Naheola
- International Paper Pine Hill Mill
- International Paper Prattville Mill
- International Paper Riverdale Mill
- Mead Coated Board
- PCA Jackson Mill
- Sand Valley Power Station
- U.S. Alliance Coosa Mill
- Westervelt Moundville Cogen
- WestRock Demopolis Mill

=== Hydroelectric ===
- Bankhead Hydroelectric Generating Plant
- Bouldin Hydroelectric Generating Plant
- Guntersville Dam
- Harris Hydroelectric Generating Plant
- Henry Hydroelectric Generating Plant
- Holt Hydroelectric Generating Plant
- Jordan Hydroelectric Generating Plant
- Lay Hydroelectric Generating Plant
- Logan Martin Hydroelectric Generating Plant
- Martin Hydroelectric Generating Plant
- Millers Ferry Lock and Dam
- Mitchell Hydroelectric Generating Plant
- Smith Hydroelectric Generating Plant
- Thurlow Hydroelectric Generating Plant
- Weiss Hydroelectric Generating Plant
- Wheeler Dam
- Wilson Dam
- Yates Hydroelectric Generating Plant

=== Solar photovoltaic ===
Name	Location	Coordinates	Capacity (MW)	Year completed	Refs
Lafayette Solar Farm	Chambers County	32°52′35″N 85°23′18″W	79.2	2017	
Reynolds Landing Microgrid	Jefferson County	34°14′31″N 86°31′19″W	1	2018	
River Bend Solar	Lauderdale County	34.8315°N 87.8422°W	75.0	2016	

=== Wind ===
Alabama had no utility-scale wind facilities in 2019.

== Closed/cancelled facilities ==
Name	Location	Coordinates	Capacity (MW)	Energy type	Operation dates	Refs
Bellefonte Nuclear Generating Station	Jackson County	34°42′31″N 85°55′45″W	Unknown	Nuclear	Cancelled	
Colbert County	Colbert Fossil Plant (Plant Colbert)	34°44′27.5994″N 87°50′57.8004″W	1,350.0	Coal (bituminous)	1955-2016	
Widows Creek Fossil Plant	Jackson County	34°53′28.8996″N 85°45′2.8002″W	1,969.0	Coal (bituminous)	1952-2015	
William Crawford Gorgas Electric Generating Plant (Plant Gorgas)	Walker County	33°38′42.1008″N 87°11′55.5″W	1,416.7	Coal (bituminous)	1951-2019	

== Utility companies ==
- Tennessee Valley Authority (TVA)
- Alabama Power

== See also ==
- List of power stations in the United States
- List of power stations operated by the Tennessee Valley Authority
- List of coal-fired power stations in the United States
