= Volkert, Inc. =

American consulting firm

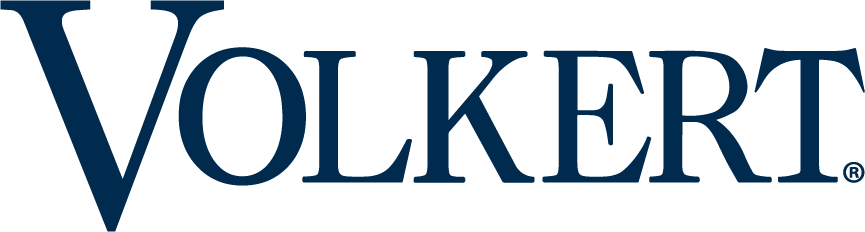

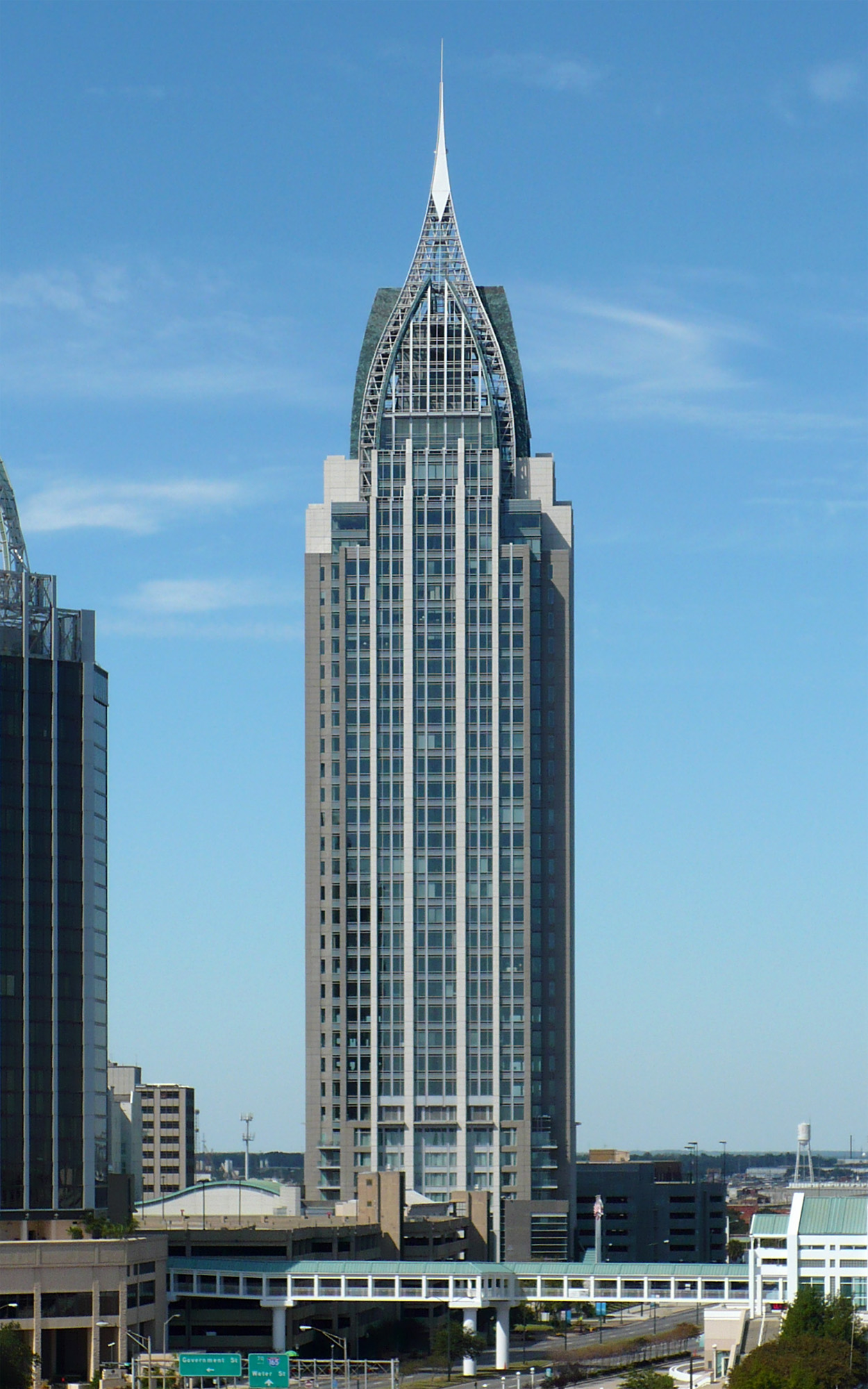
- Headquarters at RSA Tower in Mobile
- Type: Private, ESOP
- Industry: Consulting firm
- Founded: 1925 (as Doullut & Ewin, Inc.)
- Founder: Paul Doullut and James P. Ewin
- Headquarters: RSA Tower, Mobile, Alabama, United States
- Number of locations: Washington D.C., Atlanta, Miami, Nashville, New Orleans, Houston, Austin, Dallas, and Denver among 70 offices across the United States
- Area served: United States
- Key people: Thomas Hand (Chairman and CEO); Michael Sampson (CFO); Leon Barkan (President and COO)
- Services: Engineering, Environmental, Program Management, Construction Management
- Number of employees: c. 1,600 (2025)
- Website: www.volkert.com

Volkert, Inc. is a privately held consulting firm based in Mobile, Alabama, in the United States. The company offers engineering, environmental consulting, program management, and construction services. It was founded in 1925 in New Orleans as Doullut and Ewin, Inc. The company operates with a workforce of 1500 people at more than 70 offices in 26 states and the District of Columbia. Volkert was ranked at 90 among the top 500 design firms in the United States in 2025 by Engineering News-Record (and 76 among "Pure Designers"). In 2025 Volkert was also named the Top Design Firm in the Texas and Louisiana region by Engineering News-Record.

== History ==
The company was founded in 1925 in New Orleans as Doullut and Ewin, Inc. It relocated to Mobile in 1946 and was reorganized as J. P. Ewin, Inc. It was renamed as the Ewin Engineering Corporation in 1950. David G. Volkert took possession of the company in 1954. The company was renamed as David Volkert & Associates, Inc. in 1963. An employee stock ownership plan was begun in 1975. New subsidiaries, Volkert Construction Services, Inc. and Volkert Environmental Group, Inc. were created in 1984 and 1985. It was again renamed in 1999, this time as Volkert & Associates, Inc. David G. Volkert died in 2001. The firm was inducted into the Alabama Engineering Hall of Fame in 2003. Volkert also has nine projects and three associates in the Alabama Engineering Hall of Fame. It was renamed as Volkert, Inc. in 2009. Subsidiary Volkert Global was formed in 2014 and concluded operations and was dissolved in 2020.

== Current projects ==
Volkert is a member of the team delivering the new Mobile River Bridge which will provide a new route over the Mobile River on I-10 as well as the Bayway which will replace the existing Bayway in Mobile, Alabama. The project has an estimated cost of $3.7 billion and is set to have the second tallest bridge deck over a navigable waterway in the United States upon completion—with only that of the Golden Gate Bridge being higher.

Volkert is also a lead designer for the I-35 Capital Express Central Project in Austin, Texas. The $3-billion project is a “cap and stitch” effort which will reconnect Austin communities by reconstructing the interstate at a sub-surface level while also providing the opportunity of the construction of parks and multi-use paths above it. The firm is leading the design for tunneling, structural retrofit of upper decks, retaining walls, bridges, and interchanges.

== Notable projects ==
- Anacostia Freeway/I-295, Washington D.C.
- Arlington National Cemetery Visitors Center, Arlington County, Virginia
- Battleship Parkway (commonly called the Mobile Bay Causeway), Mobile, Alabama
- Bonnet Carré Spillway, St. Charles Parish, Louisiana
- Bordelonville Floodgate, Avoyelles Parish, Louisiana
- Cochrane–Africatown USA Bridge, Mobile, Alabama
- I-10 Bonnet Carré Spillway Bridge, St. Charles and St. John Parishes, Louisiana
- I-22 (or Corridor X), northwestern Alabama
- I-59/I-20 Birmingham CBD Bridges, Birmingham, Alabama
- IHNC Lake Borgne Surge Barrier, west of New Orleans, Louisiana
- Interstate 10 Twin Bridges (officially the Jubilee Parkway and commonly the "Bayway"), Mobile Bay, Alabama
- Lake Pontchartrain Causeway, New Orleans, Louisiana
- Louisiana State Capitol, Baton Rouge, Louisiana
- Mobile Regional Airport, Mobile, Alabama
- Port of Miami, Miami, Florida
- Port of Mobile, Mobile, Alabama
- Port of New Orleans, New Orleans, Louisiana
- Robert F. Kennedy Memorial Stadium, Washington, D.C.
- Smithsonian Metro Station, Washington, D.C.
- Tulane Stadium (also known as the Sugar Bowl), New Orleans, Louisiana,
- United States Capitol Visitor Center, Washington, D.C.
- United States Navy Memorial, Washington, D.C.
- USS Alabama and USS Drum, Mobile, Alabama
