= Bucks, Alabama =

- Unincorporated community Census-designated place
- Location in Mobile County, Alabama
- Coordinates: 31°01′01″N 88°01′30″W
- Country: United States
- State: Alabama
- County: Mobile

Area
  - Total: 0.42 sq mi (1.10 km^{2})
  - Land: 0.39 sq mi (1.00 km^{2})
  - Water: 0.035 sq mi (0.09 km^{2})
- Elevation: 49 ft (15 m)

Population (2020)
  - Total: 22
  - Density: 56.8/sq mi (21.93/km^{2})
- Time zone: UTC-6 (Central (CST))
  - Summer (DST): UTC-5 (CDT)
- ZIP code: 36512
- Area code: 251
- FIPS code: 01-10456
- GNIS feature ID: 2628581

Bucks is an unincorporated community and census-designated place (CDP) in Mobile County, Alabama, United States. As of the 2020 census, its population was 22, down from 32 at the 2010 census. It is located in the northeastern section of the county near the Mobile River, along U.S. Route 43. The James M. Barry Electric Generating Plant, a coal- and natural gas-fired power station operated by Alabama Power, is located in Bucks.

== Geography ==
U.S. Route 43, the only highway through the community, leads south 23 miles (37 km) to Mobile and north 5 miles (8 km) to Mount Vernon.

According to the U.S. Census Bureau, the Bucks CDP has an area of 0.42 square miles (1.1 km^{2}), of which 0.04 square miles (0.10 km^{2}), or 8.51%, are water. The Mobile River forms the eastern edge of the community.

== Demographics ==
Historical population
Census	Pop.	Note	%±
2010	32		—
2020	22		−31.2%
U.S. Decennial Census

Bucks was first listed as a census designated place in the 2010 U.S. census.

=== 2020 census ===
Bucks CDP, Alabama – Racial and ethnic composition Note: the US Census treats Hispanic/Latino as an ethnic category. This table excludes Latinos from the racial categories and assigns them to a separate category. Hispanics/Latinos may be of any race.
Race / Ethnicity (NH = Non-Hispanic)	Pop 2010	Pop 2020	% 2010	% 2020
White alone (NH)	18	6	56.25%	27.27%
Black or African American alone (NH)	10	7	31.25%	31.82%
Native American or Alaska Native alone (NH)	1	5	3.13%	22.73%
Asian alone (NH)	0	0	0.00%	0.00%
Native Hawaiian or Pacific Islander alone (NH)	0	0	0.00%	0.00%
Other race alone (NH)	0	0	0.00%	0.00%
Mixed race or Multiracial (NH)	2	0	6.25%	0.00%
Hispanic or Latino (any race)	1	4	3.13%	18.18%
Total	32	22	100.00%	100.00%

=== 2010 census ===
In 2010, Bucks had a population of 32. The racial and ethnic composition of the population was 59.4% white, 31.3% black or African American, 3.1% Native American, 6.3% from two or more races and 3.1% Hispanic or Latino of any race.

== Education ==
Residents are zoned to Mobile County Public School System campuses. Residents are zoned to Citronelle High School.
