= Greater Gulf State Fair =

Annual event in Mobile, Alabama, United States

- Genre: Agricultural
- Dates: late October
- Location: Mobile, Alabama
- Years active: 70–71
- Website: http://thegroundsmobile.com/

The Greater Gulf State Fair is an annual fair and agricultural show held at the Greater Gulf State Fairgrounds in Mobile, Alabama. It features livestock competitions, rides, concessions, motor contests, and concerts. It has been held every year since 1955 and moved to its current location in 1974. The event's name stems from serving people from Lower Alabama, Lower Mississippi, and the Panhandle of Florida. It is the largest fair in the state of Alabama.

== Background ==
The Greater Gulf State Fair began as a fund-raising initiative for the Mobile Jaycees, a group of members of the Mobile Junior Chamber of Commerce. It was first held at Blakeley Island in 1955 and drew 60,000 people in its inaugural year. Elvis Presley, the first concert performer, offered them a four-year contract to return, but the Fair declined. With the event's success, the Jaycees hired a president to oversee planning in 1958. During these years, the event occurred at Ladd Stadium and later at Hartwell Field in Mobile. In 1974, the Fair moved to its permanent residence at The Grounds in west Mobile. It was renamed "the Grounds" in 2014.

The rides at each Fair are a combination of the Fair that begins in Canada, travels down opposite seaboards, and regroups in Mobile.
