= James H. Miller Jr. Electric Generating Plant =

Coal-fired power plant in Jefferson County, Alabama

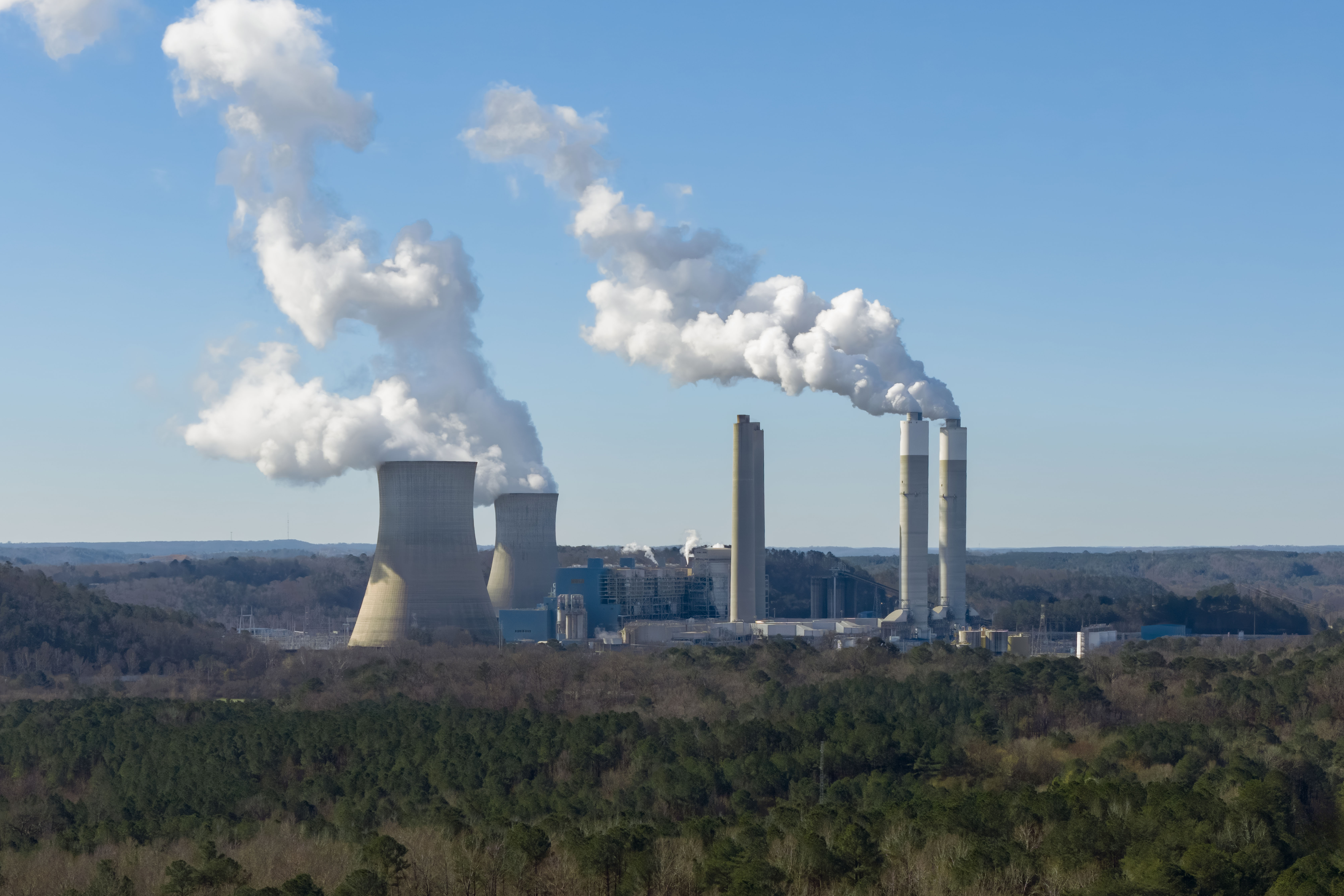
- The plant in 2026
- Country: United States
- Location: West Jefferson, Alabama
- Coordinates: 33°37′55″N 87°03′38″W
- Status: Operational
- Commission date: Unit 1 - 1978; Unit 2 - 1985; Unit 3 - 1989; Unit 4 - 1991
- Owner: Alabama Power Company

Thermal power station
- Primary fuel: Coal

Power generation
- Nameplate capacity: 2,640 MW

External links
- Commons: Related media on Commons

James H. Miller Jr. Electric Generating Plant, also known as Miller Steam Plant or Plant Miller, is a coal-fired electrical generation facility sitting on approximately 800 acres (320 ha) in West Jefferson, Alabama. It is owned by Alabama Power, a subsidiary of Southern Company.

The plant has four units, the first of which opened in 1978. Additional units commenced operation in 1985, 1989, and 1991, respectively. Each unit has a capacity of 705.5 MWe (660 MWe net). The plant contains two natural draft cooling towers. It is situated on a main tributary to the Black Warrior River, and its ash lagoon discharges contaminants to the river.

In 2023, for the ninth consecutive year, Plant Miller was the largest single producer of greenhouse gas pollution in the United States. The plant emitted almost 16.6 million tons of carbon dioxide. Although Plant Miller's parent company, Southern Company, has a net zero emissions target, this has not been reflected in the planning documents of its subsidiaries, including Plant Miller. As of 2024, Plant Miller is not planned for closure.

Advocates from Energy Alabama argued that the continued operation of Plant Miller is harming Alabama through emissions of nitrogen oxides, sulfur dioxide, and mercury, and that owners are ignoring better alternatives.

== See also ==
- Birmingham District
- List of largest power stations in the United States
