= Blakeley Island (Alabama) =

Coordinates: 30°43′16″N 88°1′39″W

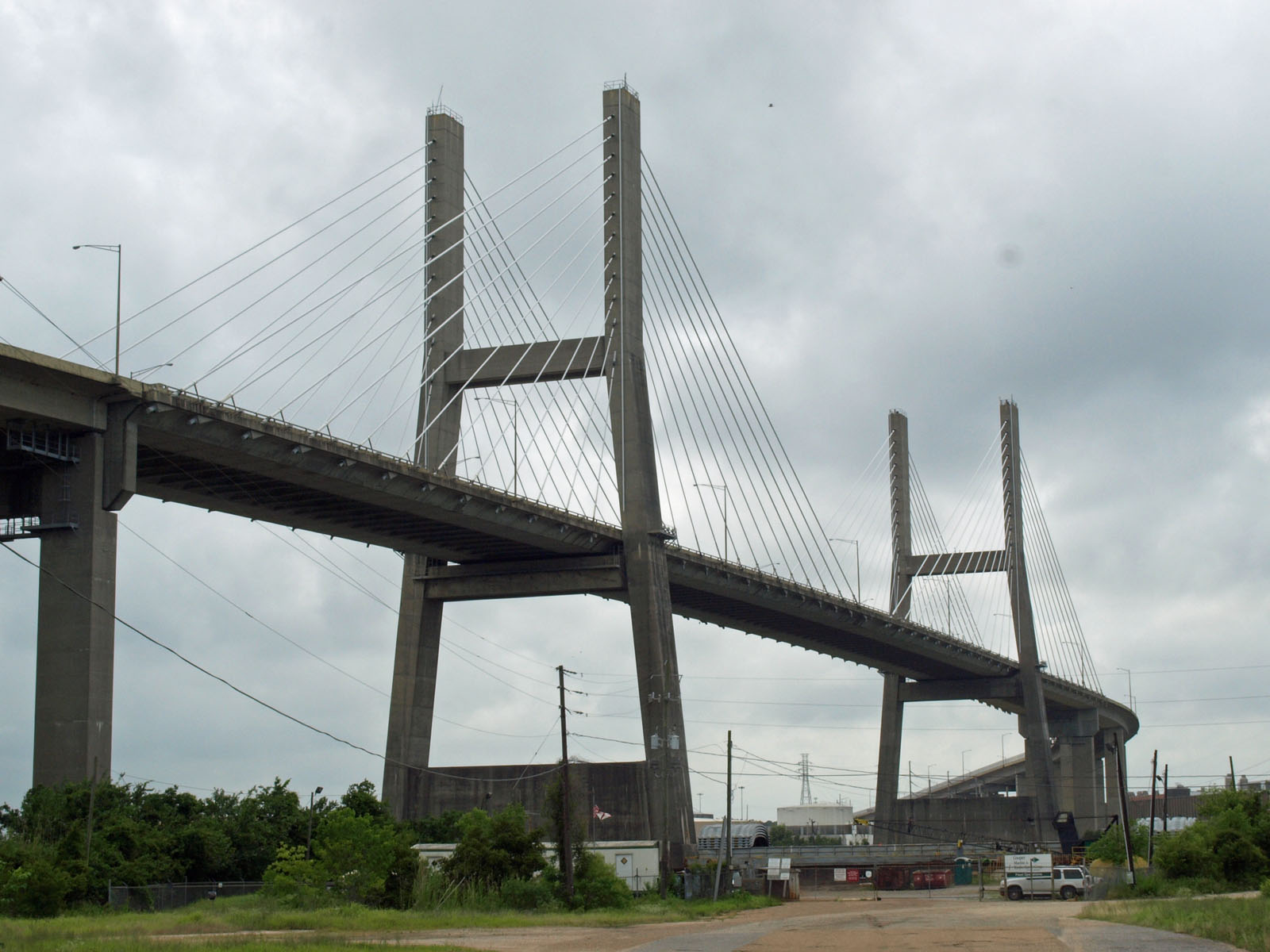
Cochrane-Africatown USA Bridge on the northern side of the island.

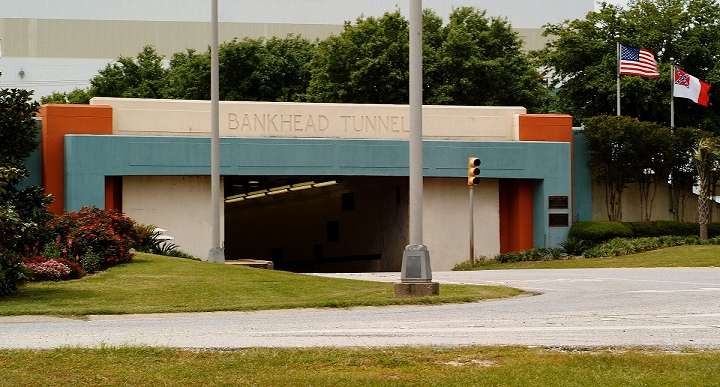
The eastern entrance of the Bankhead Tunnel on the southern side of the island.

Blakeley Island is an island in the U.S. state of Alabama, within the city limits of Mobile. Located on the northwestern coast of Mobile Bay, it is bounded on the west by the Mobile River, on the south by Pinto Island and Mobile Bay, and on the east and north by the Spanish River. Blakeley serves as a vital road connection point between the Bankhead Tunnel, George Wallace Tunnel, and Cochrane–Africatown USA Bridge on its east side and the Battleship Parkway and Jubilee Parkway on its west side. The northern end is largely undeveloped, while the southern end is dedicated to industrial uses, primarily petrochemical storage and shipbuilding. The largest complex is the shipyards of Austal USA. Approximately 1.25 miles (2.01 km) at its widest and 6 miles (9.7 km) at its longest, it has an average elevation of 7 feet (2.1 m). It, along with downtown, forms District Two of Mobile's city council districts.

== Archive ==
- https://frisco.org/mainline/2014/12/10/blakeley-island-alabama-car-ferry/

== See also ==
- Blakeley, Alabama
