= Colbert Combustion Turbine Plant =

Natural gas power plant in Alabama, United States

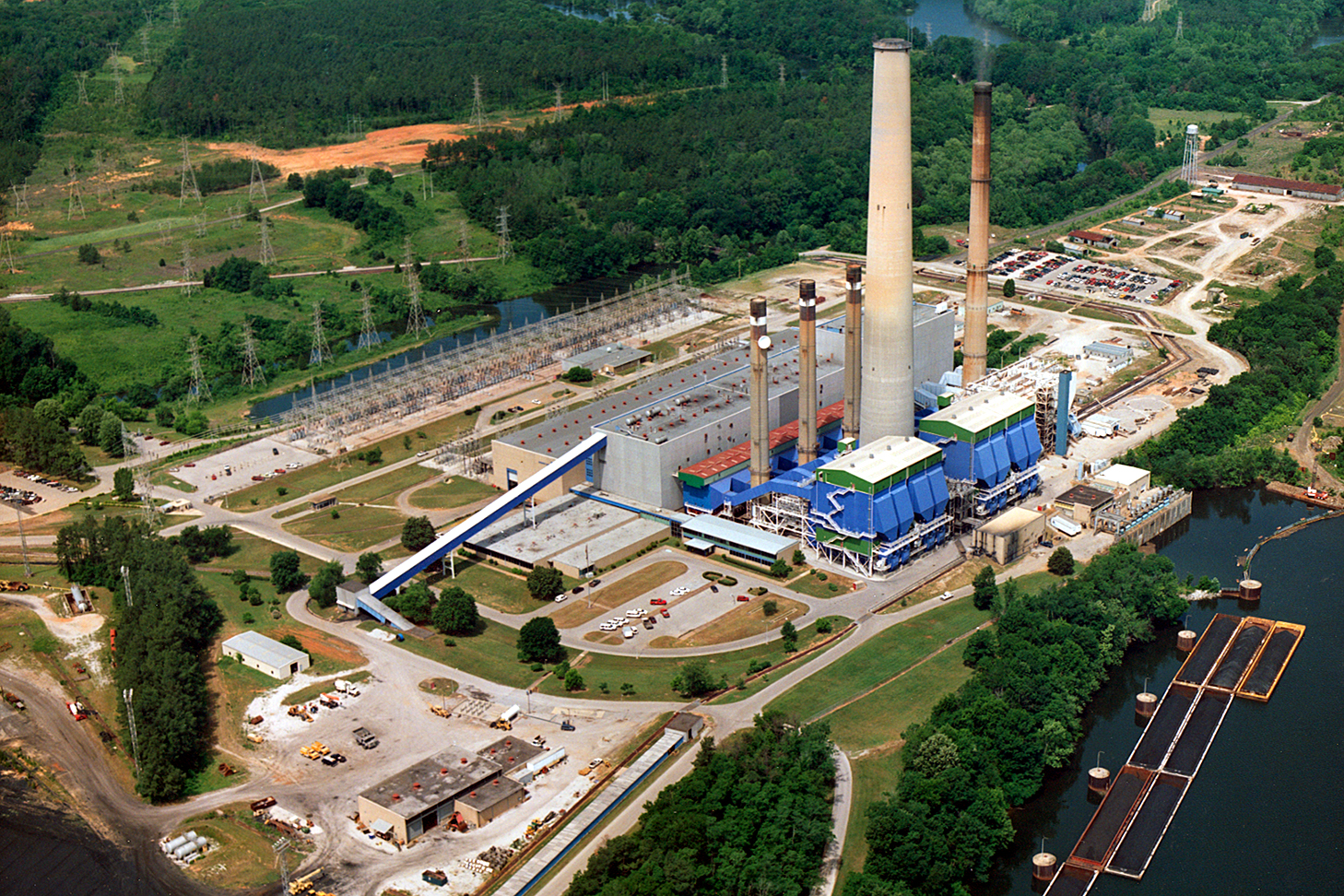
- Aerial photograph of the now-demolished Colbert Fossil Plant. The new gas power plant on the left.
- Country: United States
- Location: 307 Gas Turbine Road; Tuscumbia, Alabama
- Coordinates: 34°44′27″N 87°50′56″W
- Status: Operational
- Commission date: Coal units Unit 1: January 18, 1955; Unit 2: March 1, 1955; Unit 3: July 29, 1955; November 4, 1955; Natural gas units Units 1-8: 1972
- Construction cost: Coal units $99,104,091 (equivalent to $903,092,000 in 2024)
- Owner: Tennessee Valley Authority
- Operator: Tennessee Valley Authority

Thermal power station
- Primary fuel: Natural gas

Power generation
- Nameplate capacity: 392 MW_{e}

The Colbert Combustion Turbine Plant is a combustion turbine natural gas-fired power plant operated by the Tennessee Valley Authority (TVA) near Tuscumbia, Alabama. Commissioned in 1972, it is currently the oldest gas-fired power plant operated by TVA. The site was formerly home to the Colbert Fossil Plant, a coal-fired power station which operated from 1955 to 2016.

== History ==
Work began on the Colbert Fossil Plant, then known as the Colbert Steam Plant, on October 15, 1951. The first unit began operation on January 18, 1955. Unit 2 began operation on March 1, 1955, Unit 3 on July 29, 1955, and Unit 4 on November 4, 1955. Each of these units had a capacity of 200 megawatts. A fifth unit began operation in 1965. The combustion turbine units were added in 1972, making them the first natural-gas units in the TVA system.

The TVA board voted to close the coal-fired units at Colbert on November 14, 2013. Units 1 through 4 were retired in March 2016, with the last unit being idled on March 23, 2016. The coal plant was demolished on August 25, 2021.

== See also ==
- List of power stations in Alabama
- List of power stations operated by the Tennessee Valley Authority
