= George Wallace Tunnel =

Pair of road tunnels in Alabama, US

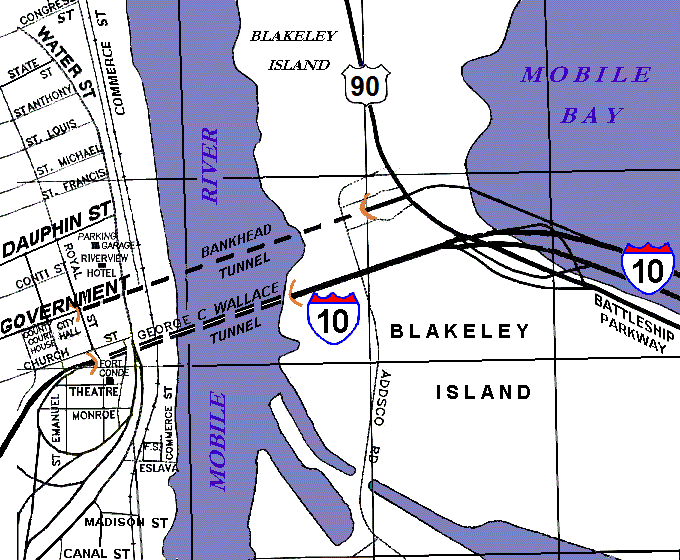
- Map of the Wallace (lower) and Bankhead (upper) tunnels under the Mobile River.
- Interactive map of George Wallace Tunnel

Overview
- Official name: George Corley Wallace Tunnel
- Other name: Wallace Tunnel
- Location: Mobile River, Mobile, Alabama
- Coordinates: 30°41′24″N 88°02′08″W
- Route: four lanes of I-10

Operation
- Opened: February 9, 1973; 53 years ago
- Traffic: 78,775 (2015)
- Character: Dual four-lane road tunnel
- Toll: none

Technical
- Length: 3,000 feet (914 m)
- No. of lanes: 4
- Operating speed: 55 miles per hour (89 km/h)
- Tunnel clearance: 16 feet (5 m)
- Depth below water: 40 feet (12 m) (from surface to top of tunnel)

The George Wallace Tunnel is a pair of road tunnels that carry Interstate 10 through Mobile, Alabama from the city's downtown, going beneath the Mobile River, and emerging on Blakeley Island where they join the Jubilee Parkway over Mobile Bay.

It, like the smaller Bankhead Tunnel a few blocks upriver from it, was constructed in Mobile at the shipyards of the Alabama Drydock and Shipbuilding Company (ADDSCO) from 1969 to 1973. The George Corley Wallace Tunnel, actually two separate tunnels (one for two lanes of travel eastbound, and one for two lanes of travel westbound on Interstate 10), was built in sections and floated to the proper positions, then sunk. Each section was sunk next to the previous section and joined underwater. When all sections were connected, and concrete set into place, they were pumped dry and finished out. The depth of clearance is 40 ft (12.2 m) for the ship channel over the tunnel. This is the same clearance as the older Bankhead Tunnel.

The tunnel was officially opened to traffic on February 9, 1973, after $50 million ($291.8 million in 2020 dollars) was spent to construct it. It was named after George Wallace, the Governor of Alabama at the time.

== Entrances ==
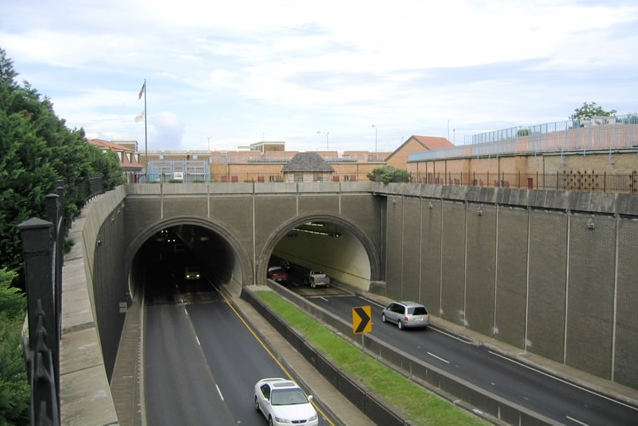
Interstate 10 eastbound in downtown entering the Wallace Tunnel.

Inside of the tunnel, westbound lane.

The George C. Wallace Tunnel, like the Bankhead Tunnel, emerges on the west end under Royal Street, in downtown Mobile (see map); however, whereas the Bankhead Tunnel emerges at street level joining into Government Street, the George C. Wallace Tunnel slopes upward to continue Interstate 10 as an elevated highway above the Mobile streets. On the eastern end, over Blakeley Island, the George C. Wallace Tunnel again slopes upward becoming the elevated spans of I-10, which cross Mobile Bay eastward, along the twin bridges of the curved I-10 Jubilee Parkway.

The western approach of the tunnel features a sharp curve which causes lengthy traffic backups in each direction depending on demand, and is part of the impetus to study a replacement for the tunnel.

== Nearby construction ==
In the area where the George C. Wallace Tunnel passes beneath downtown Mobile, the re-filled area was later topped with a reconstruction of Fort Conde and several other new buildings, extending from the Mobile River for several blocks, along Water Street and Commerce Street. Because the tunnel tubes emerge within downtown Mobile, the riverbank along the Mobile River appears as an unbroken, continuous waterfront, with no other signs of the tunnels below.

== Replacement ==
The tunnel is expected to be bypassed by a cable-stayed bridge which will be a toll bridge. The existing tunnel will remain as is and will still be in use.

== In literature ==
Author Michael Knight mentions the tunnel in his short story "Our Lady of the Roses," first published in The Southern Review and collected in his Eveningland (2017). He refers to a game Mobile children play whenever they ride through the tunnel. They attempt to hold their breaths all the way through the passage.

== See also ==
- Fort Condé - Partial replica fort built above the tunnel during the 1970s to commemorate the French colonial-era Fort Condé at the site.
