= Alabama Power Headquarters Building =

Office building in Birmingham, Alabama, US

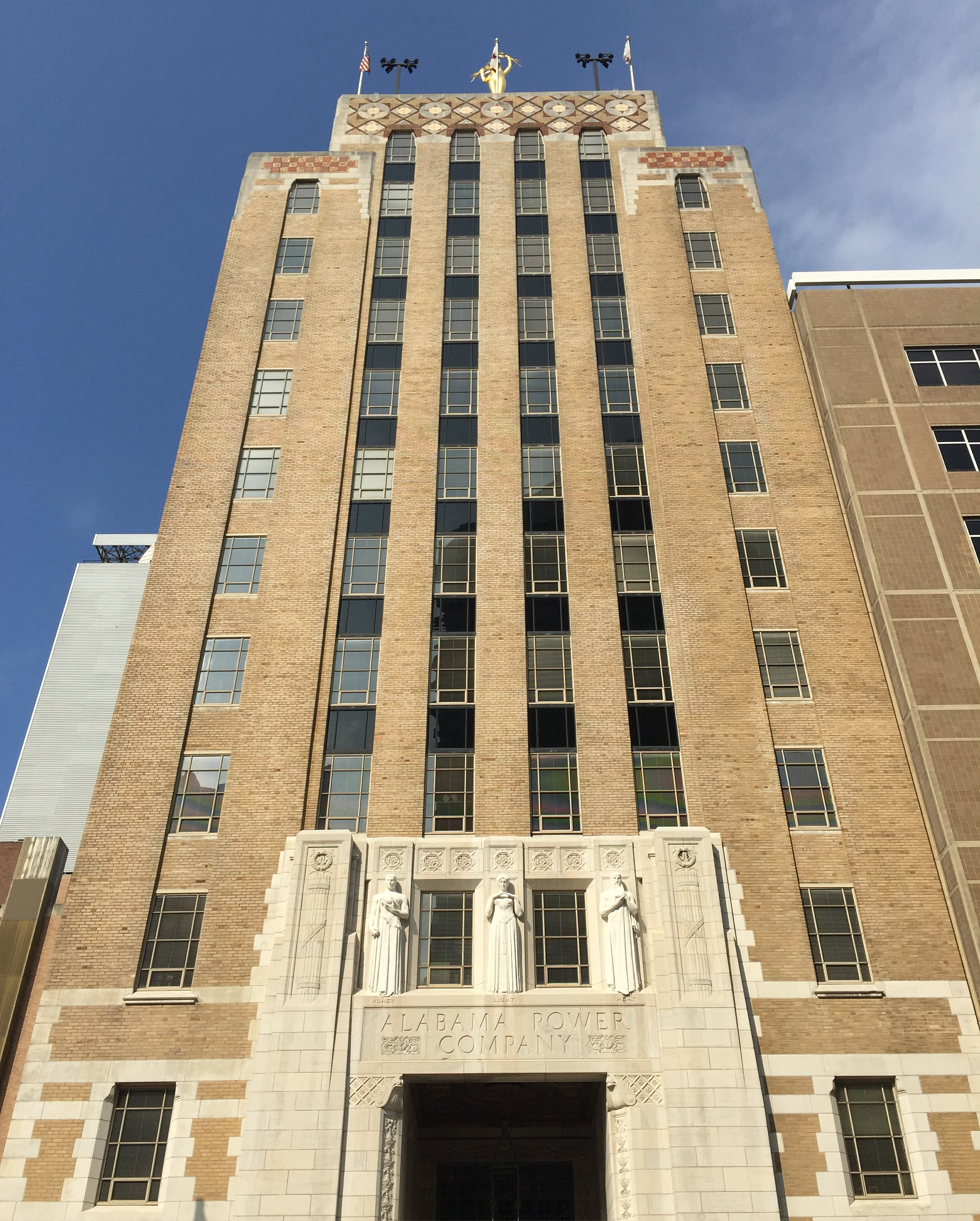
- Interactive map of the Alabama Power Headquarters Building area

General information
- Status: Completed
- Type: Corporate Headquarters
- Location: 600 18th Street North Birmingham, Alabama, US
- Coordinates: 33°31′5.34″N 86°48′45.99″W
- Construction started: 1980
- Opening: 1990
- Cost: $75 million
- Owner: Alabama Power
- Operator: Southern Company Services

Height
- Antenna spire: 322 feet (98 m)
- Top floor: 18

Technical details
- Floor count: 18
- Floor area: 900,000 square feet (83,613 m^{2})

Design and construction
- Architects: Gresham, Smith and Partners, and Geddes Brecher Qualls Cunningham, P.C.
- Structural engineer: Stanley D. Lindsey and Associates
- Services engineer: Cosentini Associates
- Main contractor: Doster Construction Company

The Alabama Power Headquarters Building is an 18-story (98 m) corporate headquarters building located in Birmingham, Alabama. The building, completed in 1990, is part of the Alabama Power Headquarters Complex which is composed of four office buildings, two parking decks, and two parking lots. The four buildings contain over 1,300,000 square feet (120,000 m^{2}) and house over 5,000 employees. The Alabama Power Headquarters Complex is one of several corporate buildings Southern Company has in the Birmingham area, the others being in the Inverness and Lakeshore area. Alabama Power also operates several retail business offices throughout the state, more than 60 different storerooms across six geographical divisions, and a large complex in northern Calera, Alabama.

== See also ==
- Alabama Power Company
- Birmingham, Alabama
- Southern Company
