= Alabama Political Reporter =

- Type: daily news site
- Owner: Bill Britt
- Editor-in-chief: Bill Britt
- Associate editor: Susan Britt
- Language: English
- Country: United States
- Website: www.alreporter.com

The Alabama Political Reporter is a daily newspaper based in Alabama.

== Notable reporters ==
Bill Britt is the Editor-in-chief. Columnist, commentator, and former Alabama State Representative Steve Flowers has described Britt as "the premier political investigative reporter" on Alabama politics.

Eddie Burkhalter, then a 2020 Poynter-Koch Media and Journalism Fellow at the Alabama Political Reporter, was a contributor to the New York Times's team coverage of the COVID-19 pandemic, which won the 2021 Pulitzer Prize for Public Service.

== Controversies ==
In 2022, the Alabama Political Reporter was one of six independent news outlets accused of downplaying negative reporting about Alabama Power and engaging in a smear campaign against Terry Dunn, a Republican Public Service Commission member and critic of Alabama Power, who subsequently lost a re-election bid.

In 2023, reporter Jacob Holmes began covering a controversy over books in the children's section of the Autauga-Prattville Library, which drew national attention and is currently the subject of a lawsuit.
