= Battleship Parkway =

- Coordinates: 30°40′29″N 87°57′57″W
- Carries: 4 lanes of US 90 / US 98
- Crosses: Mobile Bay
- Locale: Mobile, Alabama
- Other name(s): The Causeway

Characteristics
- Total length: 7 miles (11.3 km)

History
- Opened: 1926

Battleship Parkway, commonly referred to locally and in the media as the "Causeway", is a 7-mile (11.3 km) long causeway that carries US 90 and US 98 eastbound across Mobile Bay from the Bankhead Tunnel on Blakeley Island in Mobile, Alabama to Spanish Fort, Alabama. The roadway itself is a four-lane divided highway for most of its length. It is very susceptible to flooding and is usually submerged during hurricane storm surges. The Battleship Parkway is home to Battleship Memorial Park and to many of the Mobile area's more prominent seafood restaurants.

== History ==
It was constructed in 1926 as a series of raised earthen embankments and concrete bridges. It was the only road connection between Mobile and Baldwin counties over Mobile Bay until the construction of the nearby Jubilee Parkway in 1978.

In 2007 a 3.4-mile-long (5.5 km) turtle chainlink fence was constructed along part of the causeway to protect the Alabama red bellied cooter from traffic.
