= Mobile River =

Coordinates: 30°39′22″N 88°1′52″W

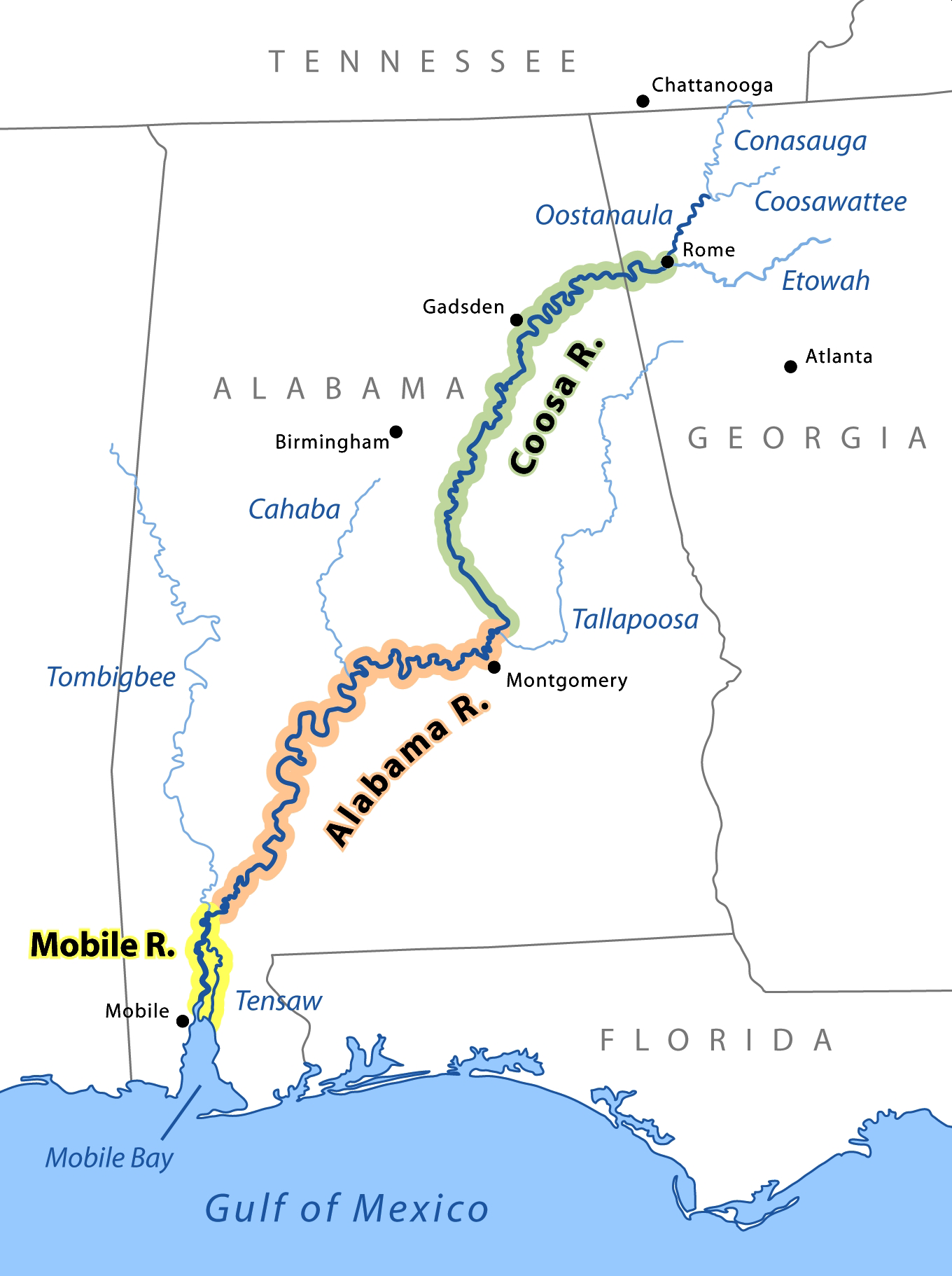
- Mobile-Alabama-Coosa River system

Location
- Country: United States (Alabama, Georgia, Tennessee)

Physical characteristics
- Source
  - location: Confluence of Tombigbee and Alabama rivers
  - elevation: 10.5 m (34 ft)
- Mouth
  - location: Mobile Bay, at Mobile, Alabama
- Length: 72 km (45 mi)
- Basin size: 115,000 km^{2} (44,000 sq mi)
- Discharge
  - average: 67,000 cubic feet per second (1,900 m^{3}/s); Min: 9,959 cubic feet per second (282.0 m^{3}/s); Max: 318,468 cubic feet per second (9,018.0 m^{3}/s); Sediment Discharge: 4.5 million tons/year 12,300 tons sediment/day (average)

The Mobile River French Rivière Mobile is located in southern Alabama in the United States. Formed out of the confluence of the Tombigbee and Alabama rivers, the approximately 45-mile-long (72 km) river drains an area of 44,000 square miles (110,000 km^{2}) of Alabama, with a watershed extending into Mississippi, Georgia, and Tennessee. Its drainage basin is the fourth-largest of primary stream drainage basins entirely in the United States. The river has historically provided the principal navigational access for Alabama. Since the construction of the Tennessee–Tombigbee Waterway, it also provides an alternative route into the Ohio River watershed.

The Tombigbee and Alabama River join to form the Mobile River approximately 50 miles (80 km) northeast of Mobile, along the county line between Mobile and Baldwin counties. The combined stream flows south, in a winding course. Approximately 6 miles (10 km) downstream from the confluence, the channel of the river divides, with the Mobile flowing along the western channel. The Tensaw River, a bayou of the Mobile River, flows alongside to the east, separated by a distance of from 2 to 5 miles (3 to 8 km) as they flow southward. The Mobile River flows through the Mobile–Tensaw River Delta and reaches Mobile Bay on the Gulf of Mexico just east of downtown Mobile.

== Biodiversity ==
The Mobile River Basin historically supported the greatest biodiversity of freshwater snail species in the world (Bogan et al. 1995), including six genera and over 100 species that were endemic to the Mobile River Basin. During the past few decades, publications in the scientific literature have primarily dealt with the apparent decimation of this fauna following the construction of dams within the Mobile River Basin and the inundation of extensive shoal (a shallow place in a body of water) habitats by impounded waters (Goodrich 1944, Athearn 1970, Heard 1970, Stein 1976, Palmer 1986, Garner 1990).

The James M. Barry Electric Generating Plant, owned by Alabama Power, has a leaking unlined fly ash pit located "on land that lies within a hairpin crook of the Mobile River." For this reason the river has been described as the third most endangered river in the United States.

== Crossings ==
This is a list of bridges and other crossings of the Mobile River from Mobile Bay upstream to its source at the confluence of the Tombigbee and Alabama rivers. Proposals for a new bridge to carry Interstate 10 over the river have been debated for several years. Currently the Alabama Department of Transportation is conducting an environmental impact study for such a crossing and into the widening of the Jubilee Parkway, which carries Interstate 10 over Mobile Bay. The location of this bridge is of great debate with some parties pushing for a crossing south of the current tunnels while others are opposed to anything south of the Cochrane–Africatown USA Bridge.

Crossing	Carries	Location	Coordinates
George Wallace Tunnel	Interstate 10	Mobile	
Bankhead Tunnel	U.S. Route 98	Mobile	
Cochrane–Africatown USA Bridge	U.S. Route 90 U.S. Route 98	Mobile	
14-Mile Bridge	CSX Transportation		
General W.K. Wilson Jr. Bridge	Interstate 65		

== Gallery ==
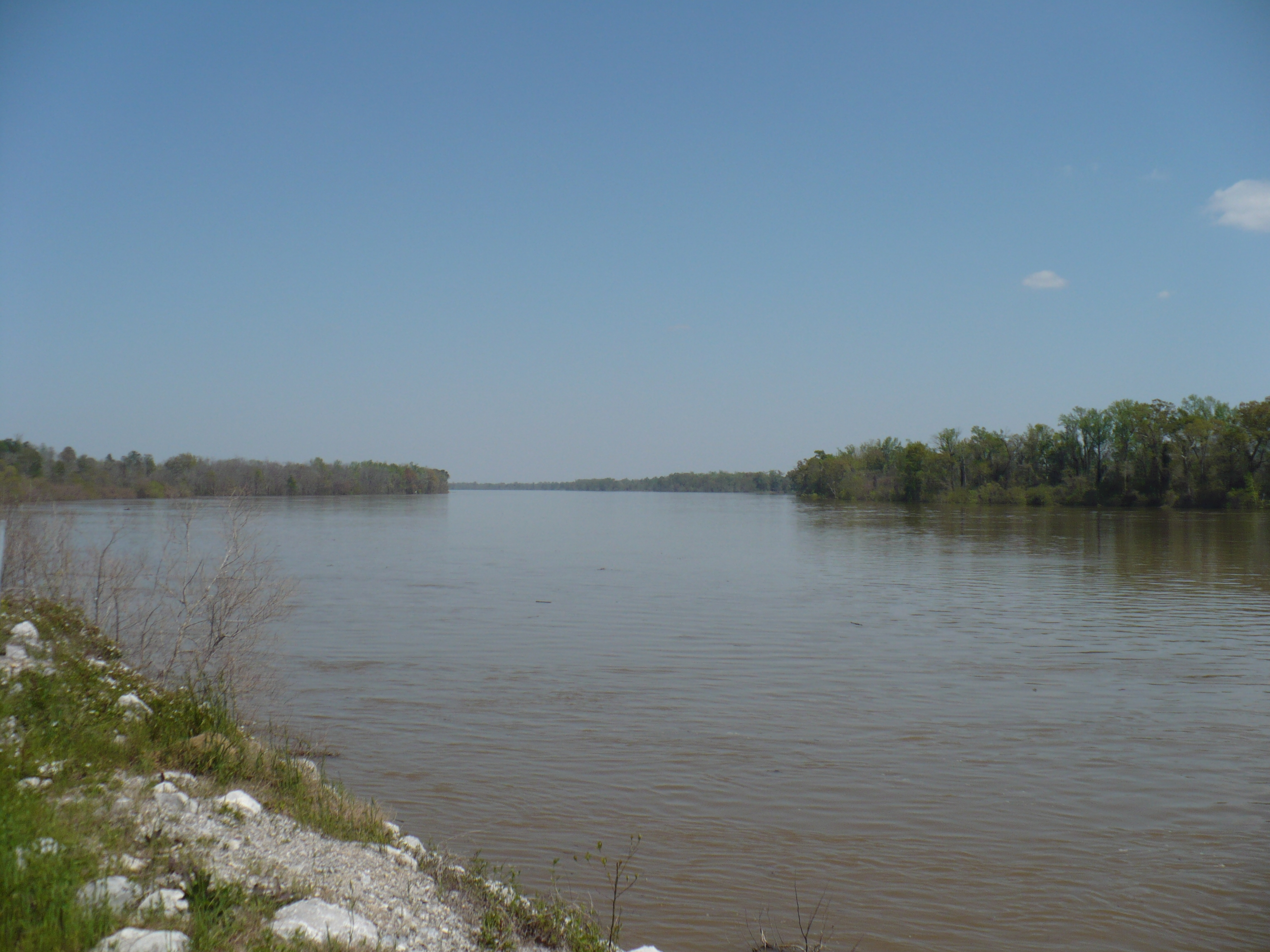
The Mobile River at the Old Fort Stoddert landing, near Mount Vernon, in 2009.

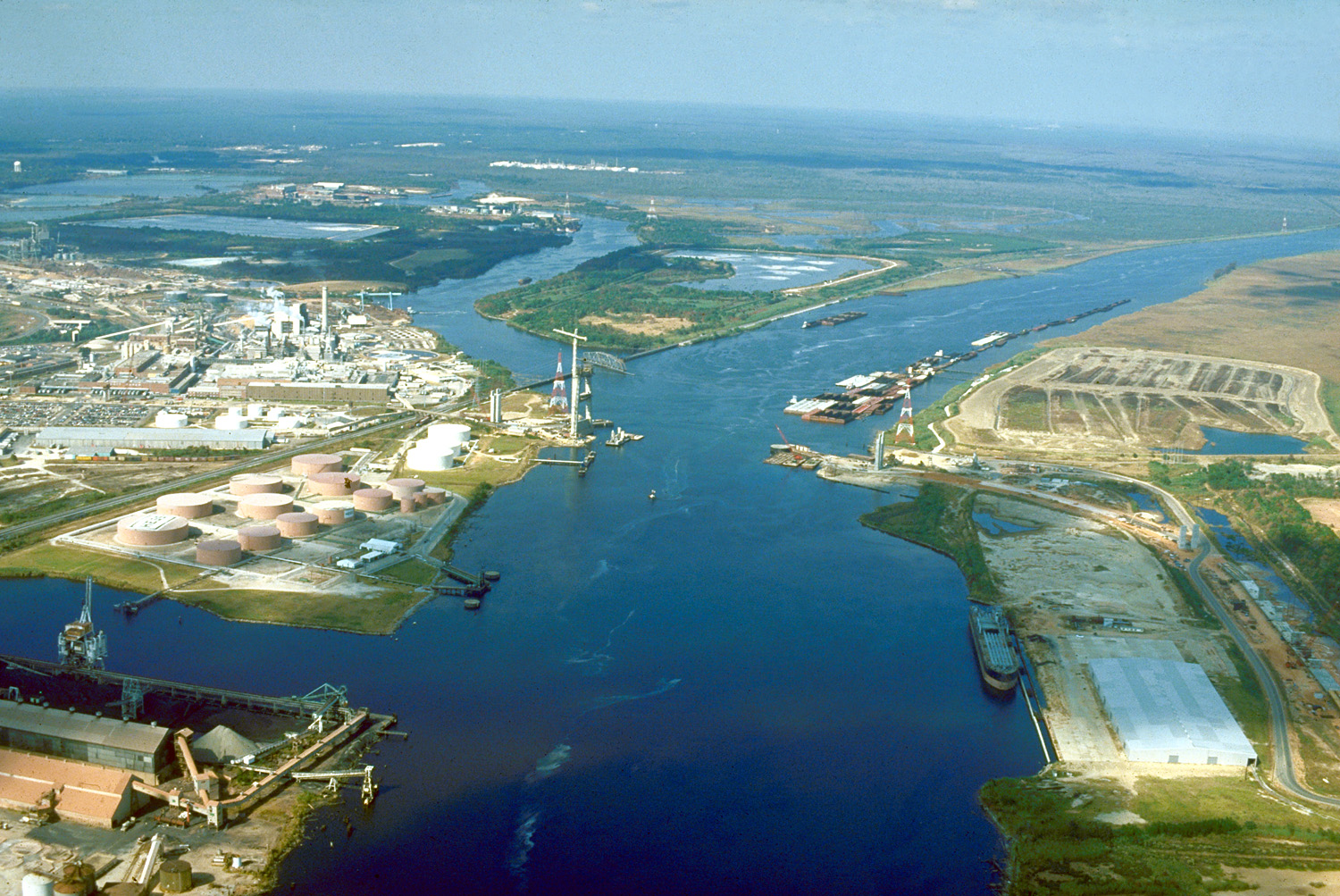
Aerial view of the Mobile River at its confluence with Chickasaw Creek, about 5 miles (8 km) above Mobile Bay. This photograph was taken about 1990 during construction of the Cochrane-Africatown bridge carrying U.S. Route 90 across the river. The bridge piers and construction crane are visible in the picture.

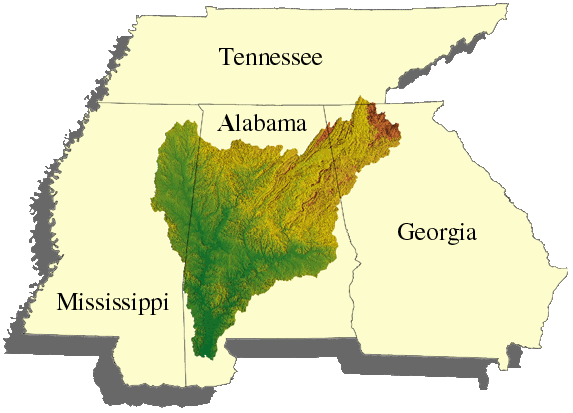
Map of the Mobile River drainage basin

== See also ==
- Mobile-Tensaw River Delta
- Alabama River
- Tombigbee River
- List of Alabama rivers
- South Atlantic-Gulf Water Resource Region
