= Bankhead Tunnel =

Tunnel in Alabama

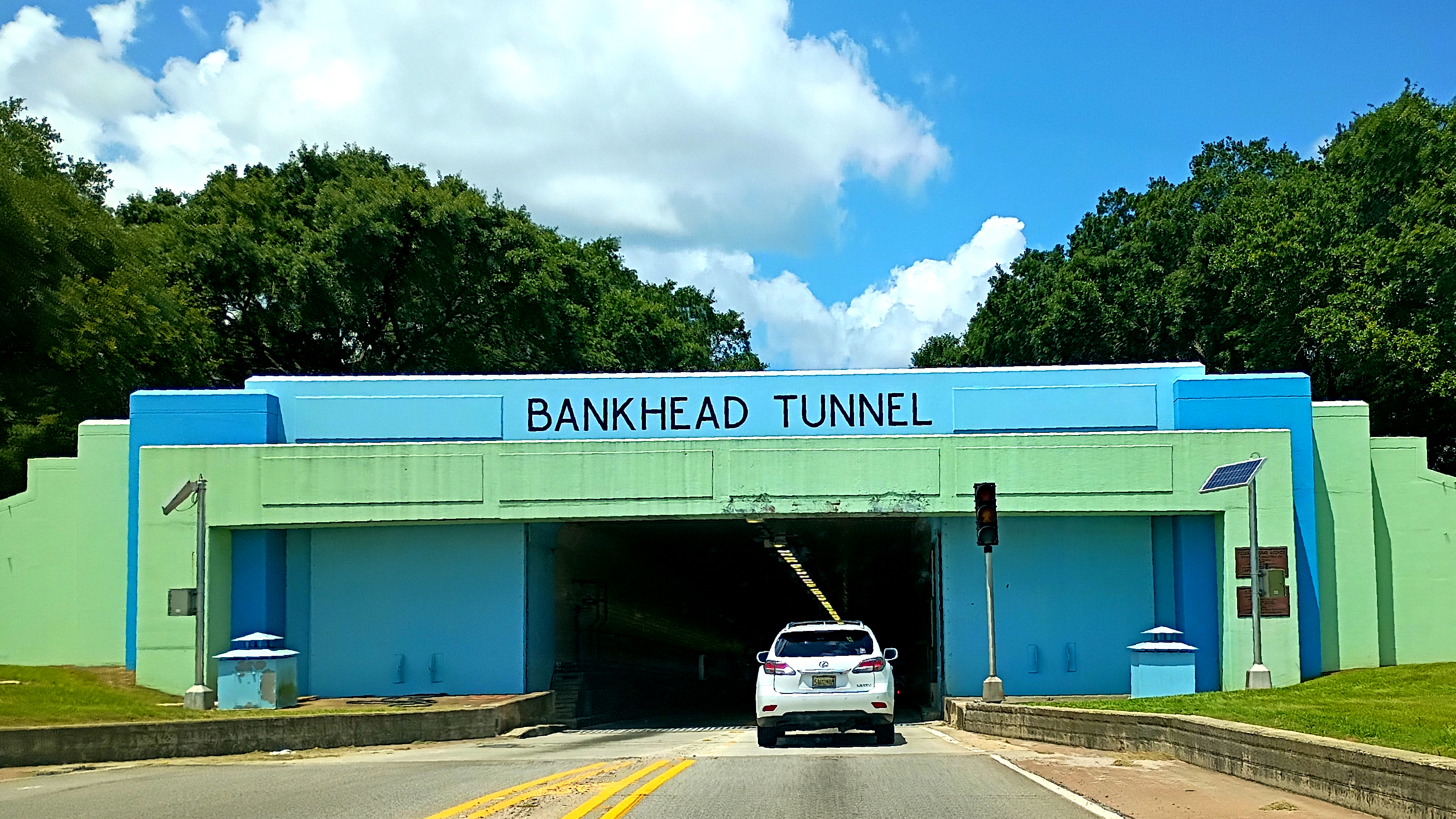
- The eastern entrance on Blakeley Island

Overview
- Official name: John H. Bankhead Tunnel
- Location: Mobile River, Mobile, Alabama
- Coordinates: 30°41′30″N 88°02′09″W
- Route: US 98

Operation
- Opened: February 20, 1941 (built 1938-1942)
- Traffic: 28,140 (2015)
- Character: submerged road tunnel
- Toll: 1941 to mid-1970s

Technical
- Length: 3,389 feet (1,033 m)
- No. of lanes: 2
- Tunnel clearance: 12 feet (4 m)
- Width: 21 feet (6 m)

Route map
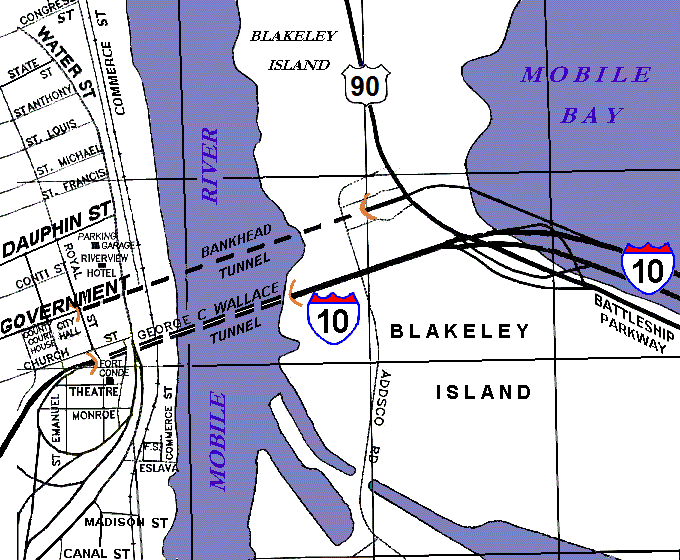
- Route map

Alabama Register of Landmarks and Heritage
- Designated: January 25, 1977

The Bankhead Tunnel, formally the John H. Bankhead Tunnel, is a road tunnel in Mobile, Alabama that carries Government Street under the Mobile River from Blakeley Island to the downtown Mobile business district. It is named for John H. Bankhead, an Alabama politician and U.S. Senator (served 1907–1920) who was also the grandfather of actress Tallulah Bankhead. It, like the larger George Wallace Tunnel (built 1969–1973) a few blocks downriver from it, was constructed in Mobile at the shipyards of the Alabama Drydock and Shipbuilding Company (ADDSCO), from 1938 to 1940. The eastern end of the Bankhead Tunnel features a large "flood door" that can be closed to prevent water from Mobile Bay flooding the tunnel during surges from hurricanes or tropical storms. It was added to the Alabama Register of Landmarks and Heritage on January 25, 1977.

== History ==
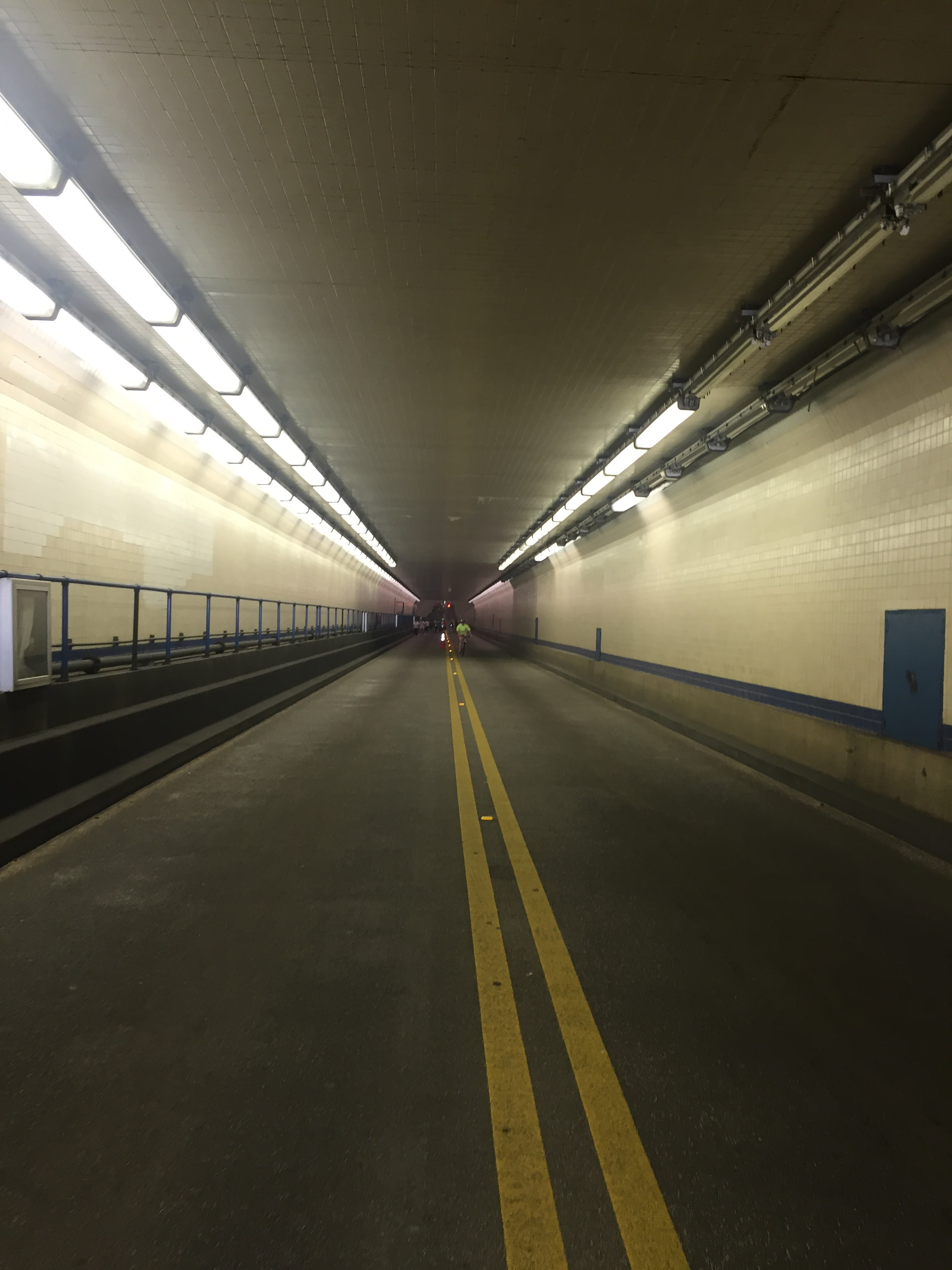
Inside the tunnel

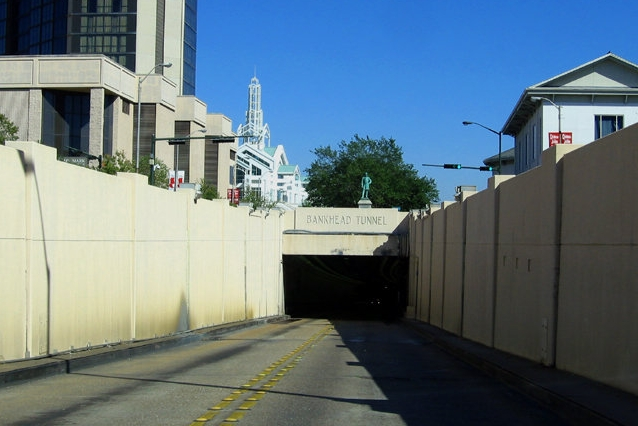
The western entrance in downtown Mobile.

The tunnel was built in sections and floated to the proper positions, then sunk. Each section was sunk next to the previous section and joined underwater. When all sections were connected, and concrete set into place, they were pumped dry and finished out. The depth of clearance is 40 ft (12.2 m) for the ship channel over the tunnel. The entrances were designed in the Art Deco style that was popular during the time of construction. It was completed in 1940 at a cost of $4 million and opened to the public on February 20, 1941. A toll fee was charged at the east side, from 1941 to the mid-1970s, when the toll plaza was dismantled. The tube carries two lanes of travel, and no pedestrian or non-motorized vehicular traffic is permitted.

The tunnel was designed by Oliver Fowlkes and construction directed by Wayne Palmer of Mobile. Only passenger cars and pickup trucks are still allowed to travel through the tunnel, as it is very narrow. Large trucks can use the George Wallace Tunnel on Interstate 10 a few blocks to the south. However, trucks with hazardous cargo must use the Cochrane–Africatown USA Bridge (U.S. 90/U.S. 98 Truck) a few miles to the north.

== Filming location ==
The tunnel was the location of a scene in the 1977 blockbuster Close Encounters of the Third Kind by director Steven Spielberg, a film which was primarily filmed in the Mobile area. In this particular scene Roy Neary, played by Richard Dreyfuss, drives through the tunnel as he chases UFOs.

The tunnel was later featured during a motorcycle chase scene in the 1991 film Stone Cold, starring Brian Bosworth.
