= Cochrane–Africatown USA Bridge =

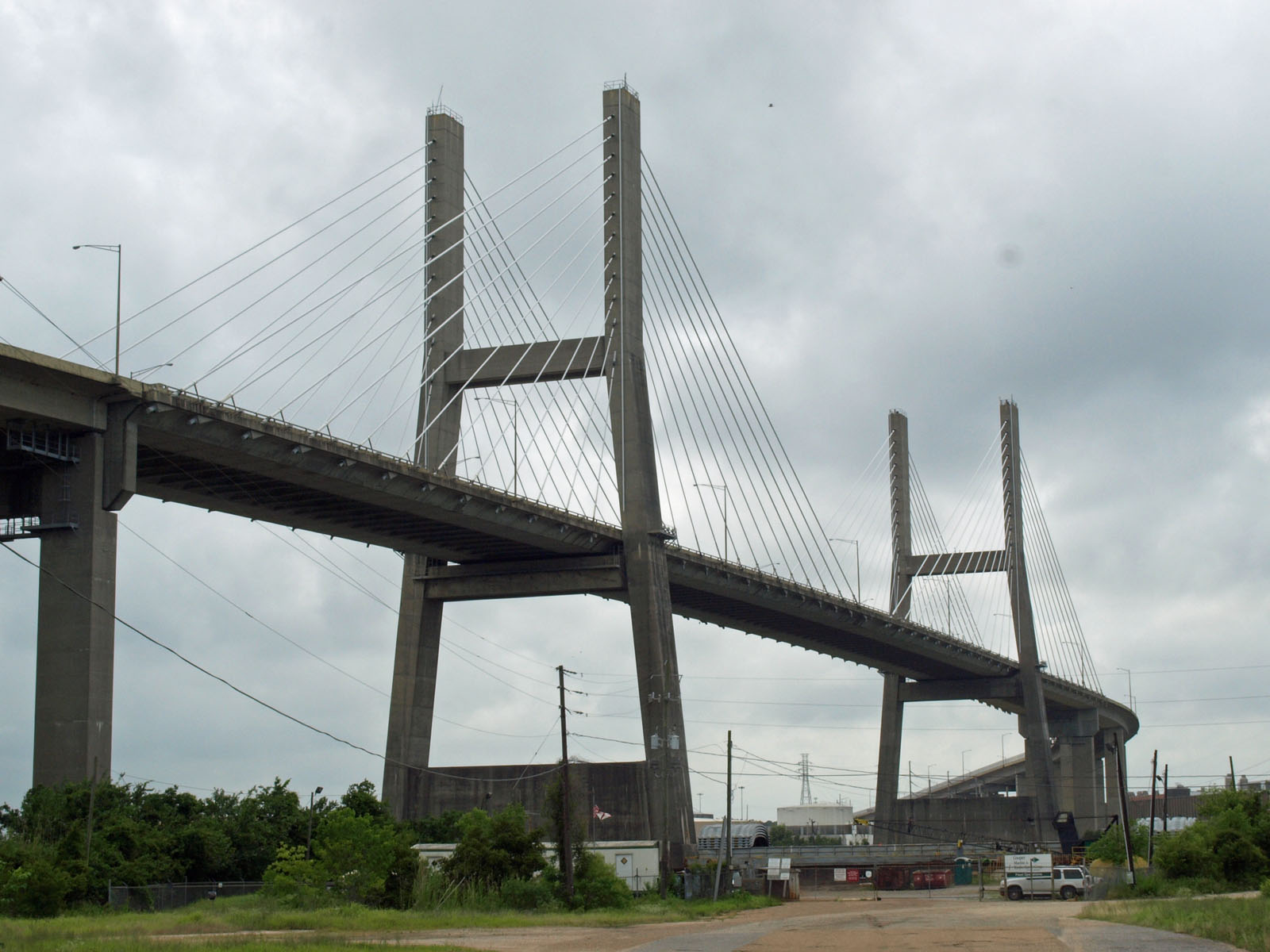
- Cochrane–Africatown USA Bridge in Mobile, Alabama
- Coordinates: 30°44′00″N 88°02′34″W
- Carries: 4 lanes of US 90 / US 98 Truck
- Crosses: Mobile River
- Locale: Mobile, Alabama
- Maintained by: ALDOT
- ID number: 015430

Characteristics
- Design: Cable-stayed bridge
- Total length: 7,291 feet (2,222 m)
- Width: 80 feet (24 m)
- Height: 350 feet (107 m)
- Longest span: 781 feet (238 m)
- Clearance below: 140 feet (43 m)

History
- Construction cost: $68.9 million
- Opened: 1991

Statistics
- Daily traffic: 10,800 (2009)
- Toll: None

Location
- Interactive map of Cochrane–Africatown USA Bridge

The Cochrane–Africatown USA Bridge is a cable-stayed bridge carrying US 90/US 98 Truck across the Mobile River from the mainland to Blakeley Island in Mobile, Alabama.

== History ==
The Cochrane–Africatown USA Bridge was completed and opened in 1991. It was named in honor of the 60-year-old vertical-lift Cochrane Bridge (in turn named for president of the Mobile, Alabama Chamber of Commerce at the time, John T. Cochrane Sr.) that it replaced, and the historic community of Africatown, which was located where the western approach to the bridge was built. In 1997 community activists promoted preservation and designation of the Africatown Historic District to encourage development there. The district was included on Mobile's African American Heritage Trail in 2009. In 2012 it was added to the National Register of Historic Places.

Volkert and Associates, Inc. design for the bridge earned it the Outstanding Engineering Achievement in the U.S.A. Award from the National Society of Professional Engineers and the Award of Excellence in Highway Design from the Federal Highway Administration, both in 1992.

This was the first, and is still the only, cable-stayed bridge in the state of Alabama. The bridge was damaged on August 29, 2005, when Hurricane Katrina broke a 13,000-ton semi-submersible platform, the PSS Chemul, free from drydock and wedged it under the bridge. The bridge remained in service and continued to carry two lanes of traffic after the storm.

Damage to the bridge was most cosmetic, including damage to concrete and guard rails, and at least one broken cable stay dampener. The repair also including centering the bridge on its bearing structure. After repairs the bridge was reopened to four lanes of traffic.
