= Alabama Power =

American electrical company

Alabama Power Company

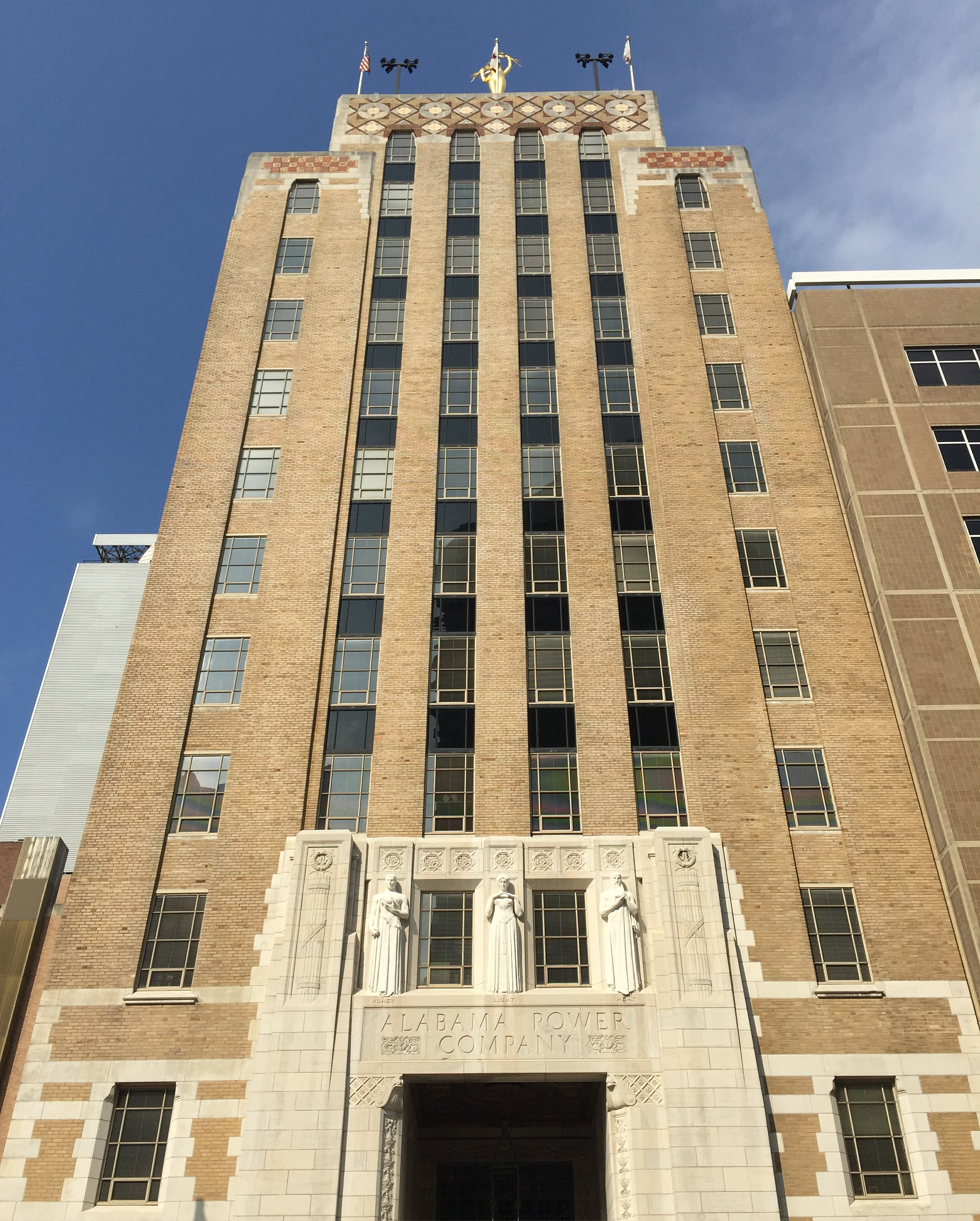
- Alabama Power's headquarters in Downtown Birmingham, Alabama
- Type: Subsidiary
- Industry: Electricity
- Founded: 1906; 120 years ago
- Headquarters: Birmingham, Alabama, US; Alabama Power Headquarters Complex
- Key people: Jeff Peoples (chairman, CEO and president); Moses Feagin (CFO)
- Products: Electric power
- Revenue: ▲US$7.817 billion (2022)
- Parent: Southern Company
- Website: alabamapower.com

Alabama Power Company, headquartered in Birmingham, Alabama, is a company in the southern United States that provides electricity service to 1.4 million customers in the southern two-thirds of Alabama. It also operates appliance stores. It is one of four U.S. utilities operated by the Southern Company, one of the nation's largest generators of electricity.

Alabama Power is an investor-owned, tax-paying utility, and the second largest subsidiary of Southern Company. More than 84,000 miles (135,000 km) of power lines carry electricity to customers throughout a service territory of 44,500 square miles (115,000 km^{2}).

Alabama Power's hydroelectric generating plants encompass several lakes on the Tallapoosa, Coosa, and Black Warrior rivers, as well as coal, oil, natural gas, nuclear and cogeneration plants in various parts of the state.

== Pollution ==
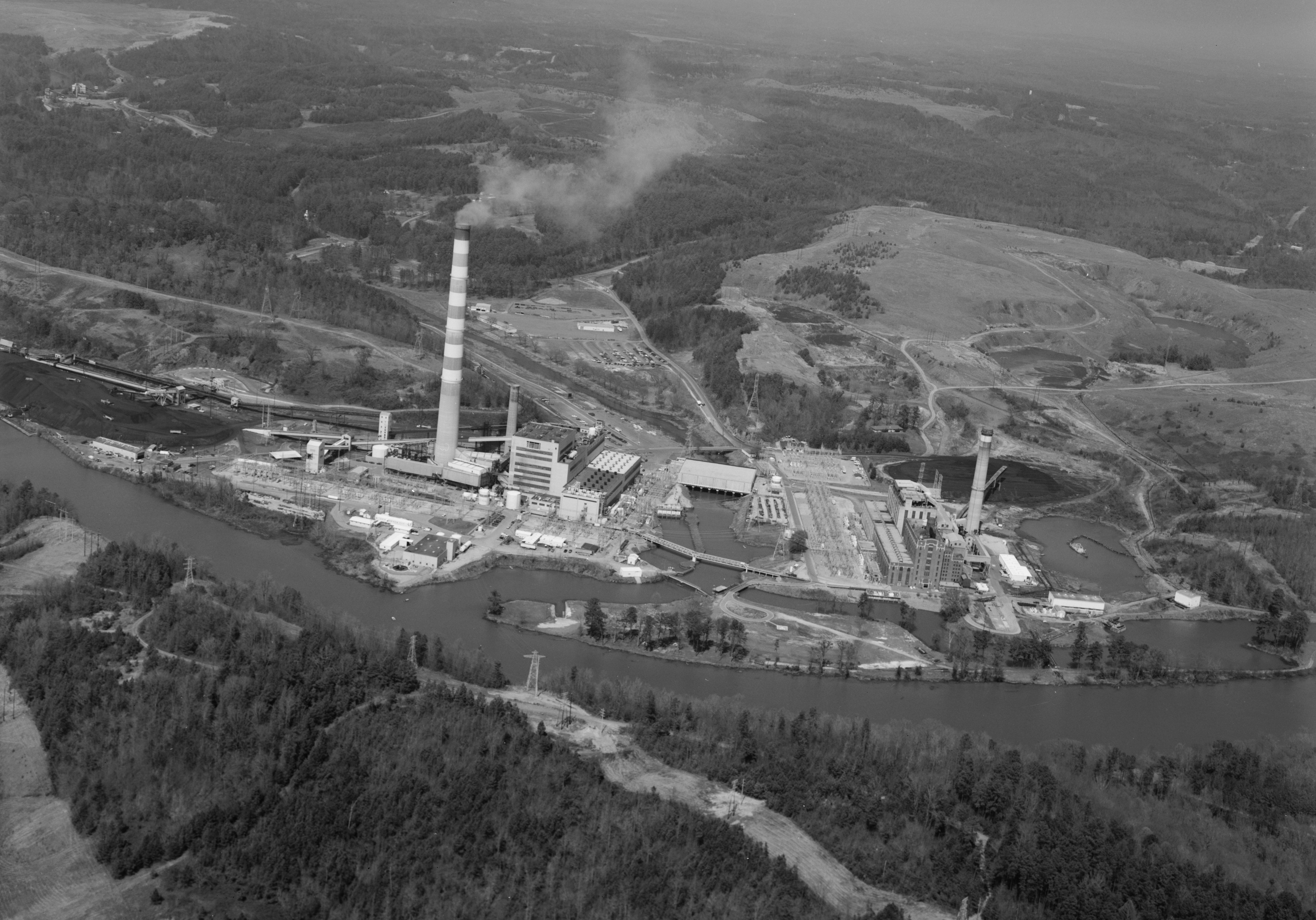
William Crawford Gorgas Electric Generating Plant

In 1999, the United States Environmental Protection Agency commenced an enforcement action against Alabama Power under the Clean Air Act. In 2006, the EPA announced that Alabama Power had agreed to spend more than $200 m to upgrade pollution controls as a partial settlement of this action. The settlement did not include claims regarding five coal-fired plants. Those claims proceeded to trial, and Alabama Power prevailed. However, the Southern Environmental Law Center (SELC) has stated that they intend to appeal the ruling. SELC was involved in a case against Duke Energy that was appealed to the Supreme Court in 2006.

As of 2021, AP's coal-fired James H. Miller Jr. Electric Generating Plant is the single largest emitter of carbon dioxide in the United States.

== Public benefits ==
In addition to generating electricity, the waters surrounding the plants offer recreational opportunities for Alabama residents and visitors.

The Alabama Power Foundation is a non-profit foundation providing grants for watershed, environmental and community projects along the Coosa River and within the state of Alabama

== Allegations of media manipulation ==
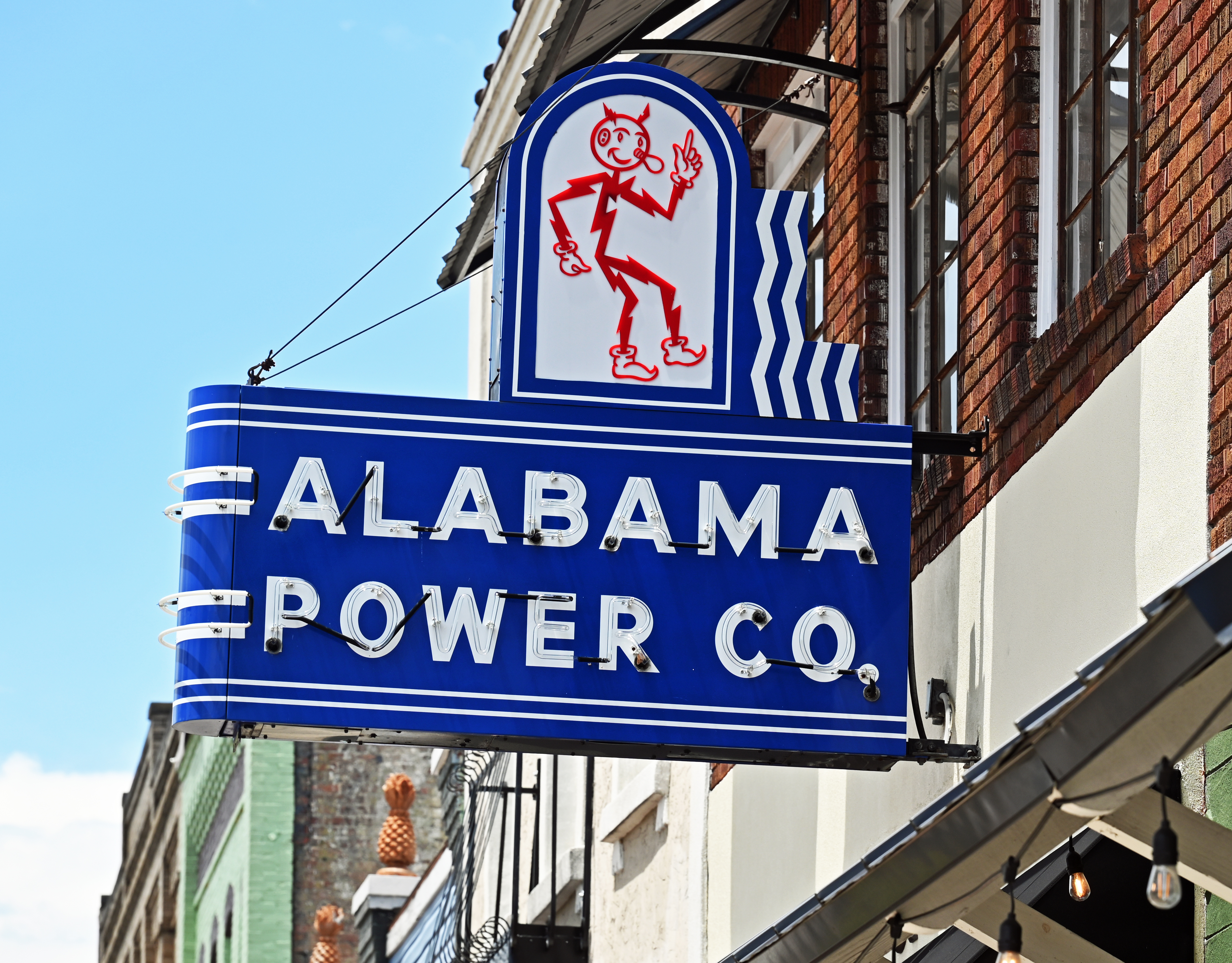
Sign in Attalla, Alabama

An investigation by National Public Radio and Floodlight News found Alabama Power paid consulting firm Matrix LLC, which in turn allegedly paid newspapers or affiliated groups which ran positive coverage of Alabama Power, namely Yellowhammer News, Alabama Political Reporter (for which Matrix designed the website), and Alabama Today.

Terry Dunn ran and won a campaign for a seat on the Alabama Public Service Commission promising to hold a formal rate hearing to investigate Alabama Power's financials and why electricity prices in Alabama are among the highest in the country. He alleges a utility company lobbyist warned him to be a team player if he wanted to keep his seat, and that utility-funded newspapers conducted a smear campaign that resulted in Dunn losing the next election and avoided the promised rate hearing.

In 2017, Matrix hired a private investigator to surveil Southern Company CEO Tom Fanning near his home.

== Power generating facilities ==
=== Fossil fuel plants ===
Plant	Nearest City	Coordinates	Capacity
James M. Barry Electric Generating Plant	Bucks, Alabama	31°00′22″N 88°00′40″W	2,657,200 kW
Ernest C. Gaston Electric Generating Plant	Wilsonville, Alabama	33°14′35″N 86°27′33″W	1,880,000 kW
William Crawford Gorgas Electric Generating Plant	Gorgas, Alabama	33°38′42″N 87°12′01″W	1,221,250 kW
Greene County Electric Generating Plant	Demopolis, Alabama	32°36′06″N 87°46′58″W	1,220,000 kW
James H. Miller Jr. Electric Generating Plant	West Jefferson, Alabama	33°37′55″N 87°03′38″W	2,640,000 kW

=== Hydroelectric plants ===
Coosa River
Plant	Nearest City	Coordinates	Capacity
Weiss Hydroelectric Generating Plant	Leesburg, Alabama	34°7′56.10″N 85°47′35.76″W	87,750 kW
Henry Hydroelectric Generating Plant	Ohatchee, Alabama	33°47′3.16″N 86°3′7.76″W	72,900 kW
Logan Martin Hydroelectric Generating Plant	Vincent, Alabama	33°25′30.66″N 86°20′11.92″W	128,250 kW
Lay Hydroelectric Generating Plant	Clanton, Alabama	32°57′48.58″N 86°31′6.14″W	177,000 kW
Mitchell Hydroelectric Generating Plant	Verbena, Alabama	32°48′20.33″N 86°26′43.08″W	170,000 kW
Jordan Hydroelectric Generating Plant	Wetumpka, Alabama	32°37′8.23″N 86°15′21.20″W	100,000 kW
Bouldin Hydroelectric Generating Plant	Wetumpka, Alabama	32°35′4.62″N 86°16′58.51″W	225,000 kW
Tallapoosa River
Plant	Nearest City	Coordinates	Capacity
Harris Hydroelectric Generating Plant	Lineville, Alabama	33°15′30.20″N 85°36′54.73″W	135,000 kW
Martin Hydroelectric Generating Plant	Tallassee, Alabama	32°40′47.69″N 85°54′36.88″W	154,200 kW
Yates Hydroelectric Generating Plant	Tallassee, Alabama	32°34′26.96″N 85°53′22.99″W	45,500 kW
Thurlow Hydroelectric Generating Plant	Tallassee, Alabama	32°32′5.46″N 85°53′15.88″W	85,000 kW
Black Warrior River
Plant	Nearest City	Coordinates	Capacity
Smith Hydroelectric Generating Plant	Jasper, Alabama	33°56′30.63″N 87°6′31.95″W	157,500 kW
Bankhead Hydroelectric Generating Plant	Northport, Alabama	33°27′28.27″N 87°21′19.94″W	53,985 kW
Holt Hydroelectric Generating Plant	Holt, Alabama	33°15′18.64″N 87°26′58.65″W	49,000 kW

=== Nuclear plants ===
Plant	Nearest City	Coordinates	Capacity
Joseph M. Farley Nuclear Generating Station	Dothan, Alabama	31°13′23.32″N 85°6′47.85″W	1,720,000 kW

=== Cogeneration and other plants ===
Plant	Nearest City	Coordinates	Capacity
Theodore Cogen Facility	Theodore, Alabama		273,870 kW
Washington County Cogen Facility	McIntosh, Alabama		122,579 kW
Sabic Cogen Facility	Burkville, Alabama	32°18′29.65″N 86°31′6.43″W	105,100 kW
Powell Avenue Steam Plant	Birmingham, Alabama		n/a - steam production only

== See also ==
Alabama Power previous logo

- Alabama Power Headquarters Building
