= Ernest C. Gaston Electric Generating Plant =

- Country: United States
- Location: Wilsonville, Alabama
- Coordinates: 33.240072°N 86.463839°W
- Status: Operational
- Owner: Alabama Power Company

Thermal power station
- Primary fuel: Coal, natural gas

Power generation
- Nameplate capacity: 1,880 MW

Ernest C. Gaston Electric Generating Plant is a coal and natural gas-fired electrical generation facility near Wilsonville, Shelby County, Alabama.

Four of the five units in the plant were converted to use natural gas under plans to reduce costs. As of 2024, Unit 5 is testing a 10 MWh thermal storage at 600 °C (1,112 °F), made of concrete. As of August 17th, 2026, Unit 5 began a Gassification process to convert the unit over from a hybrid gas/coal system to natural gas only. This process involves the removal of all coal piping and introduction of new natural gas piping to allow for a more cost efficient and environmentally sustainable power generating facility. The project is estimated to be completed before the end of 2026.
