= James M. Barry Electric Generating Plant =

Coal and gas electrical generation plant in Alabama, United States

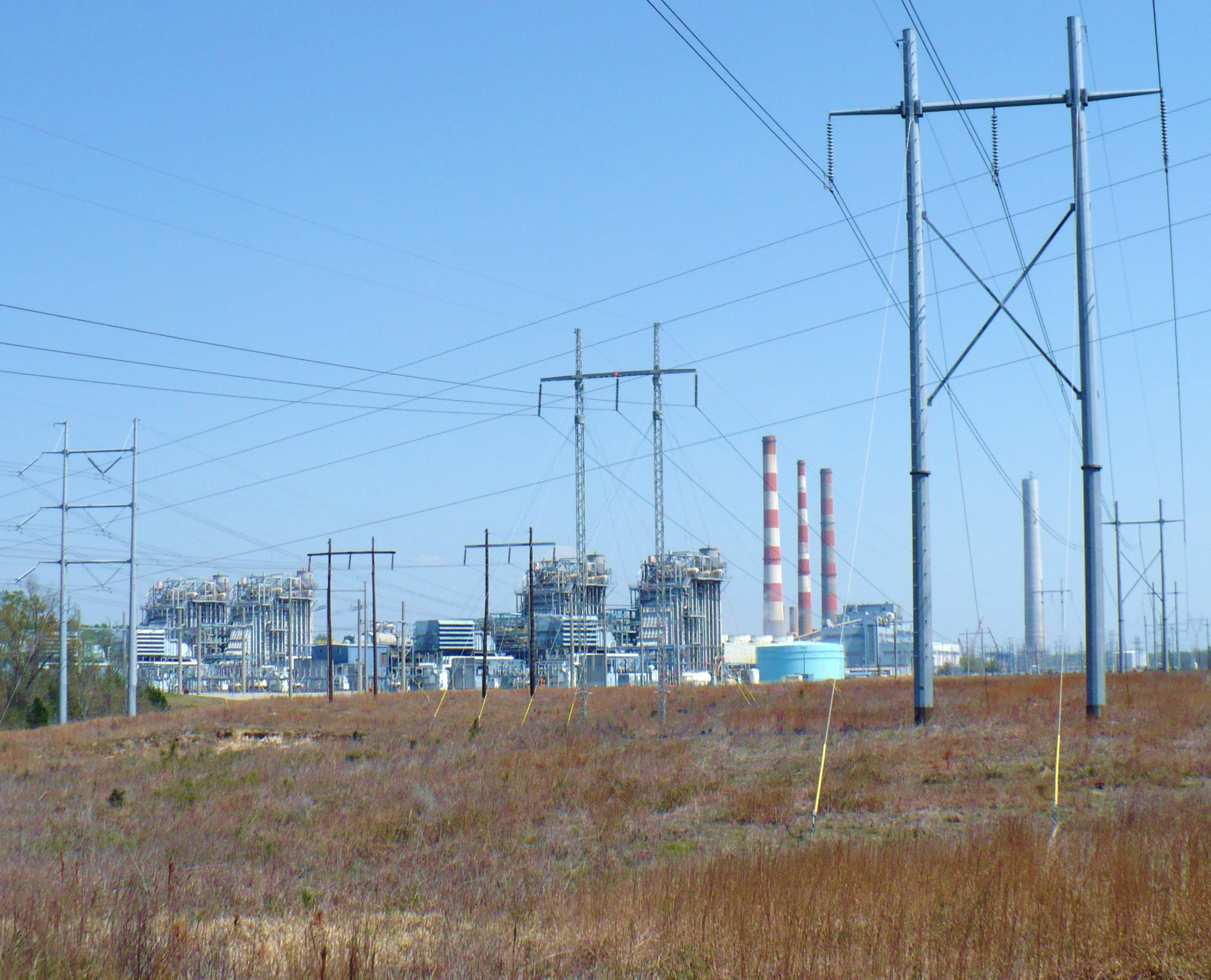
- The plant in 2009
- Country: United States
- Location: Bucks, Alabama
- Coordinates: 31°0′22″N 88°0′40″W
- Status: Operational
- Commission date: Unit 1: February, 1954; Unit 2: July, 1954; Unit 3: July, 1959; Unit 4: July, 1959; Unit 5: October, 1971; Gas Units: May, 2000
- Owner: Alabama Power Company

Thermal power station
- Primary fuel: Bituminous coal, natural gas
- Turbine technology: Steam, Combined cycle Steam, Combined Cycle Combustion turbine
- Cooling source: Mobile River

Power generation
- Nameplate capacity: 2,671 MW

James M. Barry Electric Generating Plant, also known as Barry Steam Plant or Plant Barry, is a coal- and natural gas-fired electrical generation facility in Bucks, Mobile County, Alabama, United States. It lies on the west bank of the Mobile River, using it both for coal delivery as well as for cooling water. The plant was named for James M. Barry, President of Alabama Power Company from 1949 to 1952. As of 2018, the plant has 9 units, seven of which are powered by gas and two which are powered by coal.

== Design and specification ==
The Barry Plant has two coal-fired units but originally had five coal-fired units, which came online in 1954 to 1971, with respective generating capacities of 138 MW, 137 MW, 249 MW, 362 MW, and 750 MW (year-around). Five natural gas-fired units, including three combined cycle combustion turbines (173 MWe each of winter capacity) and two combined cycle steam turbines (193 MWe each of winter capacity), were installed in 2000.

== Environmental impact ==
=== Air ===
A 2007 survey by the Washington, D.C.–based Environmental Integrity Project found that the Barry Plant ranked 25th of the top 30 mercury emitting power plants in the United States, releasing 711 pounds (323 kg) of mercury into the atmosphere annually. The plant ranked 28th for the amount of nitrogen oxides released into the atmosphere, with 24,000 tons released. Additionally, the survey found that the plant released a yearly total of 61,000 tons of sulfur dioxide and 11 million tons of carbon dioxide. A company spokesman for Alabama Power, Michael Sznajderman, noted that scrubbers are being installed at all of the company's coal-fired plants, which will reduce emission levels in coming years.

The James M. Barry Electric Generating Plant has a coal ash pond in a "hairpin crook of the Mobile River", which leaches heavy metals into the groundwater and into the river. For this reason, the Mobile River was listed as the third most endangered river in America.

=== Waste heat ===
The plant discharges all of its waste heat (about twice its electrical output) into the Mobile River.
