= Walter Bouldin Dam =

Coordinates: 32°35′03″N 86°16′57″W

- Interactive map of Walter Bouldin Dam
- Country: United States
- Location: Elmore County, Alabama
- Status: Operational
- Opening date: 1967

Walter Bouldin Dam is a dam in Elmore County, Alabama. The closest town is Wetumpka.

The earthen dam was constructed in 1967 by the Alabama Power Company, with a height of 170 feet (52 m), and a length of 11,178 feet (3,407 m) at its crest. It impounds the Coosa River for 225 MW of hydroelectric power, the last and largest of Alabama Power's string of seven hydropower facilities on that river. It's also the largest of all Alabama Power hydropower facilities.

The reservoir it creates, Bouldin Lake, is connected via free-flowing canal to Jordan Lake, making one reservoir with a water surface of 6,800 acres (2,800 ha), shoreline of about 188 miles (303 km), a total length of 18 miles (29 km), and a maximum storage volume of 236,200 acre-feet (291,300,000 m^{3}). It's an excellent recreational lake with fishing opportunities for largemouth bass, spotted bass, bluegill and other sunfish, crappie, catfish, striped bass, hybrid and white bass. The lake has two public access sites.

Walter Bouldin Dam failed on February 10, 1975 by breach, with no casualties and no property damage beyond the dam property itself.
