= Jubilee Parkway =

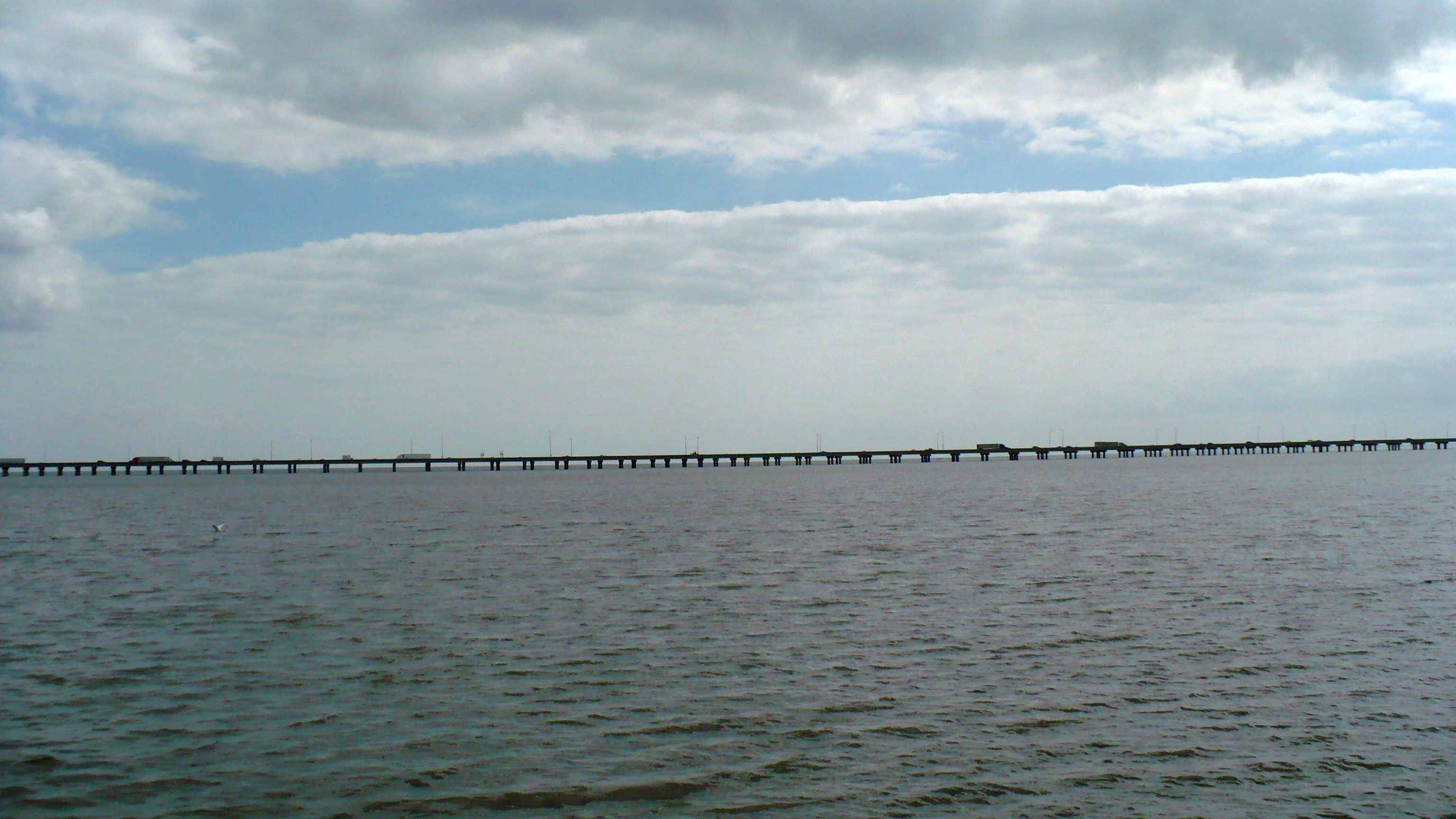
- An eastern portion of the Jubilee Parkway as seen from Meaher State Park.
- Coordinates: 30°39′55″N 87°57′49″W
- Carries: 4 lanes of I-10
- Crosses: Mobile Bay
- Locale: Baldwin County / Mobile, Alabama, USA

Characteristics
- Design: Girder bridge
- Total length: 7.5 miles (12.1 km)

History
- Opened: 1978

Location
- Interactive map of Jubilee Parkway

The Jubilee Parkway is a pair of parallel concrete viaduct bridges that carry Interstate 10 across Mobile Bay from the George Wallace Tunnel on Blakeley Island in Mobile, Alabama, eastbound to Spanish Fort/Daphne, Alabama. The bridges are similar in design to the pre-Hurricane Katrina I-10 Twin Span Bridge near New Orleans, Louisiana. Each of the two bridges is two lanes wide, for a total of four lanes, and 7.5 miles (12.1 km) long. The parkway was completed in 1978 and crosses the northern portion of Mobile Bay, running roughly parallel to the nearby Battleship Parkway, with which it has an interchange. It was named for the jubilee phenomenon that occurs intermittently in Mobile Bay, but is commonly referred to locally and in the media as the "Bayway".

== History ==
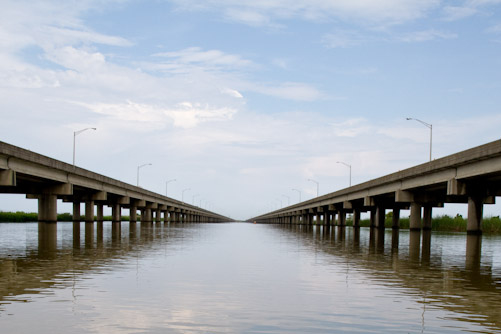
View from underneath the bridges.

Construction of the bridges began in October 1974. The section between US 90/98 (Battleship Parkway) and US 98 in Spanish Fort opened to traffic on July 28, 1977. The eastbound span of the remainder of the bridges, extending to US 90/98 and the George Wallace Tunnels, was dedicated and opened on March 20, 1978, and the westbound lanes opened on May 2, 1978.

Since 2001, the Alabama Department of Transportation (ALDOT) has planned to expand the parkway to a total of eight lanes in addition to a connecting cable-stayed bridge with a main span 1,250 feet (381 m) long and 190 feet (58 m) high that would bypass the George Wallace Tunnel. This is intended to eliminate the current traffic bottleneck on I-10 at the tunnel, but is very controversial locally due to the proposed bridge's potential visual and economic impact on the city. The arguments against the bridge have focused on the bridge's height of roughly 500 feet (152 m), taller than any other structure in the city except for the RSA Battle House Tower, as potentially overshadowing the city. The potential economic impact is that, with less than 190 feet (58 m) of clearance under the bridge, it would hamper large ships and projects from the Port of Mobile and prevent large cruise ships from accessing the Alabama Cruise Terminal.

== Incidents ==
One of the largest multi-vehicle collisions in U.S. history took place on the Parkway on the morning of March 20, 1995. Caused by fog on Mobile Bay, the accident involved around 200 vehicles, killed one person, and injured more than 90 others.

During the ice storm of January 28–30, 2014, the Bayway was closed several times for hours, diverting traffic onto the Causeway, while ALDOT crews used grading equipment to remove ice from the roadway. Asked why the Bayway wasn't sanded or salted, ALDOT officials said that they did not have the spreader equipment since ice storms occur in the area only about once every 20 years.
