= West Jefferson, Alabama =

- Town
- Location of West Jefferson in Jefferson County, Alabama.
- Coordinates: 33°39′09″N 87°04′20″W
- Country: United States
- State: Alabama
- County: Jefferson

Area
  - Total: 1.90 sq mi (4.92 km^{2})
  - Land: 1.86 sq mi (4.83 km^{2})
  - Water: 0.039 sq mi (0.10 km^{2})
- Elevation: 472 ft (144 m)

Population (2020)
  - Total: 417
  - Density: 223.8/sq mi (86.41/km^{2})
- Time zone: UTC-6 (Central (CST))
  - Summer (DST): UTC-5 (CDT)
- Area codes: 205 & 659
- FIPS code: 01-81336
- GNIS feature ID: 2406862
- Website: townofwestjefferson.com

West Jefferson is a town in Jefferson County, Alabama, United States. It incorporated in October 1964. As of the 2020 census, West Jefferson had a population of 417.

== Geography ==
According to the U.S. Census Bureau, the town has a total area of 0.7 square miles (1.8 km^{2}), all land.

== Demographics ==
Historical population
Census	Pop.	Note	%±
1970	233		—
1980	357		53.2%
1990	388		8.7%
2000	344		−11.3%
2010	338		−1.7%
2020	417		23.4%
U.S. Decennial Census; 2013 Estimate

=== 2020 census ===
West Jefferson town, Alabama – Racial and ethnic composition Note: the US Census treats Hispanic/Latino as an ethnic category. This table excludes Latinos from the racial categories and assigns them to a separate category. Hispanics/Latinos may be of any race.
Race / Ethnicity (NH = Non-Hispanic)	Pop 2000	Pop 2010	Pop 2020	% 2000	% 2010	% 2020
White alone (NH)	343	326	383	99.71%	96.45%	91.85%
Black or African American alone (NH)	0	4	3	0.00%	1.18%	0.72%
Native American or Alaska Native alone (NH)	0	0	1	0.00%	0.00%	0.24%
Asian alone (NH)	0	0	1	0.00%	0.00%	0.24%
Native Hawaiian or Pacific Islander alone (NH)	0	0	0	0.00%	0.00%	0.00%
Other race alone (NH)	0	0	0	0.00%	0.00%	0.00%
Mixed race or Multiracial (NH)	1	7	17	0.29%	2.07%	4.08%
Hispanic or Latino (any race)	0	1	12	0.00%	0.30%	2.88%
Total	344	338	417	100.00%	100.00%	100.00%

As of the 2020 United States census, there were 417 people, 193 households, and 127 families residing in the town.

=== 2000 census ===
As of the census of 2000, there were 344 people, 138 households, and 108 families residing in the town. The population density was 480.8 inhabitants per square mile (185.6/km^{2}). There were 143 housing units at an average density of 199.9 per square mile (77.2/km^{2}). The racial makeup of the town was 99.71% White, and 0.29% from two or more races.

There were 138 households, out of which 30.4% had children under the age of 18 living with them, 63.0% were married couples living together, 7.2% had a female householder with no husband present, and 21.7% were non-families. 18.8% of all households were made up of individuals, and 11.6% had someone living alone who was 65 years of age or older. The average household size was 2.49 and the average family size was 2.82.

In the town, the population was spread out, with 23.0% under the age of 18, 7.0% from 18 to 24, 28.2% from 25 to 44, 24.7% from 45 to 64, and 17.2% who were 65 years of age or older. The median age was 40 years. For every 100 females, there were 95.5 males. For every 100 females age 18 and over, there were 96.3 males.

The median income for a household in the town was $47,813, and the median income for a family was $53,750. Males had a median income of $36,406 versus $30,000 for females. The per capita income for the town was $19,256. About 1.8% of families and 2.6% of the population were below the poverty line, including none of those under the age of eighteen or sixty-five or over.
