= KANB =

KANB may refer to:

- KANB (Louisiana), a defunct radio station licensed to Shreveport, Louisiana, United States.
- KANB-LP, a low-power radio station (102.3 FM) licensed to Kalispell, Montana, United States
- the ICAO code for Anniston Metropolitan Airport in Anniston, Alabama, United States
