= Alabama State Route 202 =

State highway in Alabama, United States

State Route 202

Route information
- Maintained by ALDOT
- Length: 9.1 mi (14.6 km)

Major junctions
- West end: I-20 west of Oxford
- US 78 in Oxford
- East end: SR 21 in Anniston

Location
- Country: United States
- State: Alabama
- Counties: Calhoun, Talladega

Highway system
- Alabama State Highway System; Interstate; US; State
← SR 201	→ SR 203

State Route 202 (SR 202) is a 9.1-mile-long (14.6 km) route that serves as a connection between I-20 west of the Anniston/Oxford area and Anniston in Calhoun County.

== Route description ==
SR 202 begins at an interchange with Interstate 20 (I-20) at exit 179 near the Coldwater community. From this point, the route travels in a northeasterly direction before reaching its eastern terminus at SR 21 in downtown Anniston.

== History ==
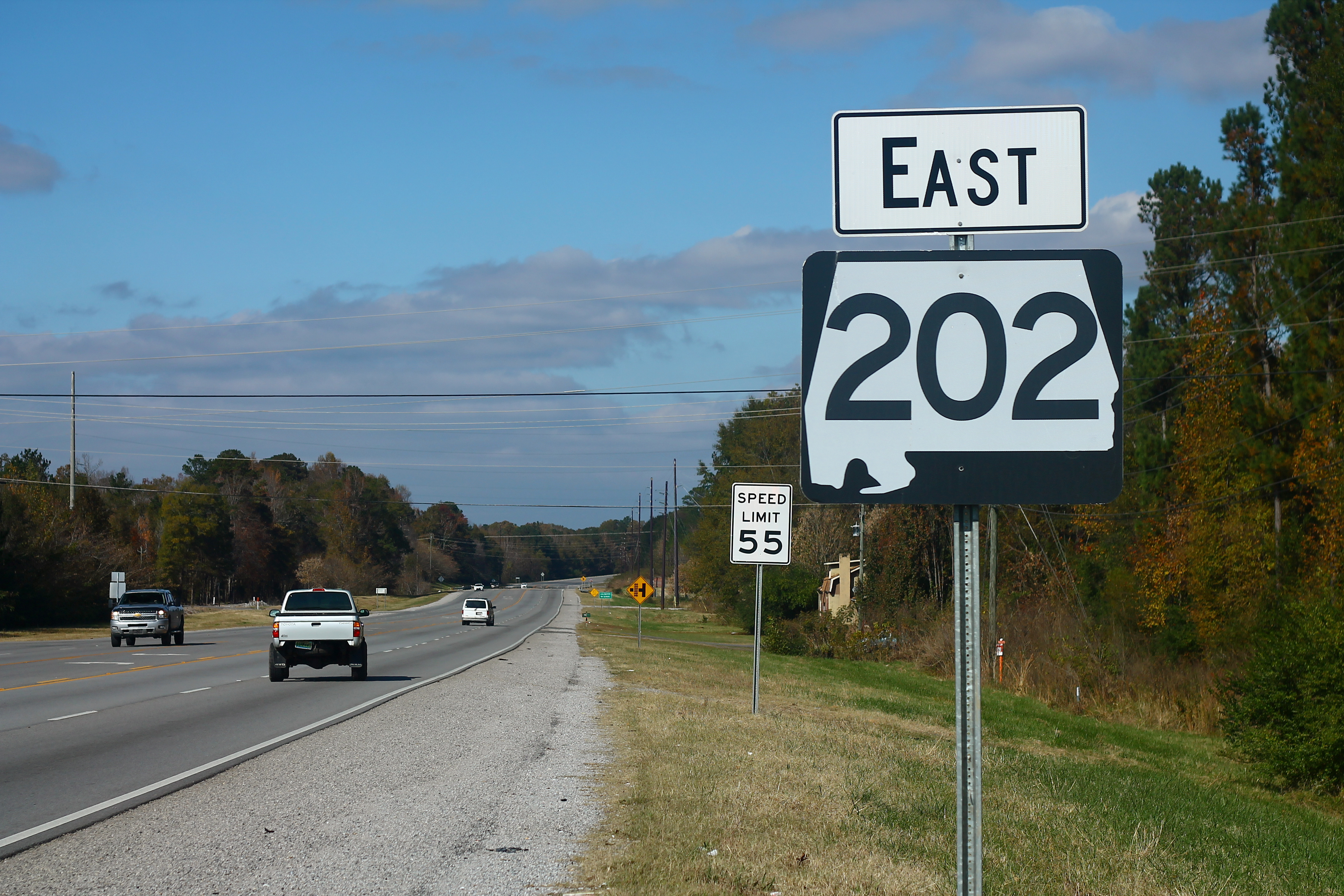
Alabama State Route 202 sign, located near US Route 78.

The western portion of SR 202 was changed in 2008 upon completion of the four lane parkway which comprises the Anniston Western Bypass. SR 202 formerly traveled westward across several substandard bridges parallel and just south of the Anniston Army Depot. It then passed through the Bynum community and one of the two main entrances to the Anniston Army Depot before terminating at US 78 just east of the Eastaboga community.

The new routing follows the new fourlane parkway southward crossing US-78 in the Coldwater community and then terminates at the interchange with I-20 at exit marker 179. With this new routing, the entire route of SR 202 is now a four laned highway.

SR 202 (prior to 2008) was the original alignment of US 78, before being abandoned in favor of the straighter alignment which runs parallel with I-20 in the 1950s.

== Anniston Bypasses ==
For many years there had been preliminary plans and discussions concerning bypasses of downtown Anniston for north/south travelers. Discussions centered on two routes, one which would run west of Anniston and connect US 431 with I-20, and the other, which would run east of Anniston and connect US 431 and SR 21 with I-20 east of Anniston.

Until 2008, the only viable north/south route through Calhoun County was SR 21/US 431 (Quintard Avenue) which passed through the center of Anniston and Oxford. Work first began in the 1970s to make an Anniston Western Bypass. Two projects were key to this effort. One was the creation of the Bynum/Leatherwood Road which is a two lane road which runs from US 431 near the Saks community northwest of Anniston southward and bypassing Anniston. This road leads to one of the two main entrances to the Anniston Army Depot (one of the largest employers in Calhoun County) and also connects to SR 202 west of Anniston. The second project was the building of a new 4 lane SR 202 which began at the intersection of 8th Street and Quintard Avenue. This new route ran due west with bridges built to pass over the rail lines run through the city of Anniston, then passing westward just north of the imposing heights of Coldwater Mountain. When completed, SR 202 was removed from its original routing of 10th Street into the western part of Anniston. The old routing and new routing met near the Monsanto Chemical facility in west Anniston. From there, the new 4 lane route westward ran parallel to the old SR 202 until just west of the intersection with the Bynum/Leatherwood Road. The combination of the Bynum/Leatherwood Road and SR 202 west of their intersection comprised the Anniston Western Bypass until the four lane was completed southward to I-20 in 2008.

The Anniston Eastern Bypass, or Eastern Parkway, is completed as of December 2015. The portion of this road is known within Oxford as Leon Smith Parkway. Within Anniston, from Oxford to Choccolocco Road, this road is known as Golden Springs Road and the remainder as Veterans Memorial Parkway. The road ultimately intersects SR 21 at a trumpet interchange in northern Anniston. The parkway crosses a portion of the former Fort McClellan property which contained some unexploded ordnance from military training that dated back more than 70 years. This segment also crosses some hilly terrain which required a significant amount of earth removal in order to build this road. The parkway is accessible directly from SR 21 and US 431. The entire route will be a four lane with only a few traffic signals to control traffic flow. In December 2015, ALDOT re-routed US 431 onto this new route leaving only SR 21 serving the downtown Anniston area along Quintard Avenue. Most of the new Eastern Parkway lies within the Anniston city limits except for a short segment near I-20 which is within the city of Oxford.

== Major intersections ==
County	Location	mi	km	Destinations	Notes
Talladega		0.0	0.0	I-20 – Birmingham, Atlanta	Western terminus; I-20 Exit 179
Calhoun	Oxford	0.960	1.545	US 78 (SR 4) – Lincoln, Oxford	
Calhoun	Anniston	9.1	14.6	SR 21 (Quintard Avenue) – Oxford, Saks	Eastern terminus
1.000 mi = 1.609 km; 1.000 km = 0.621 mi
