= Flight 861 =

Flight 861 may refer to

- KLM Flight 861, hijacked on 25 November 1973
- GP Express Flight 861 crashed on 8 June 1992
