= Watercress Darter National Wildlife Refuge =

National Wildlife Refuge in Jefferson County, Alabama

- IUCN category IV (habitat/species management area)
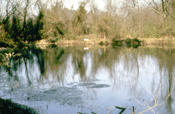
- Watercress Darter NWR

- Location within the United States
- Location: Jefferson County, Alabama, United States
- Nearest city: Bessemer, Alabama
- Coordinates: 33.374647°N 86.962892°W
- Area: 24.52 acres (9.92 ha)
- Established: 1980
- Visitors: 3,000 (in 2005)
- Governing body: U.S. Fish and Wildlife Service
- Website: Watercress Darter NWR

Watercress Darter National Wildlife Refuge is a 25-acre (100,000 m^{2}) National Wildlife Refuge located in Jefferson County, Alabama, within the city limits of Bessemer. Watercress Darter NWR consists of a .25-acre (1,000 m^{2}) pond known as Thomas Spring which is essential to the survival of the endangered watercress darter. A second pond was built on the site in 1983. The facility is unstaffed, but is administered by the Mountain Longleaf National Wildlife Refuge in Anniston, Alabama.

== Wildlife ==
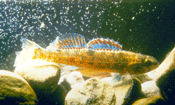
Watercress Darter

The facility operates exclusively to protect the endangered watercress darter.

== Facilities ==
The refuge is open to the public and offers limited opportunities for hiking and wildlife photography. Fishing is not permitted on the refuge for the protection of the watercress darter.

== See also ==
- List of National Wildlife Refuges
