= GP Express Airlines =

American airline

IATA	ICAO	Call sign
—	GPE	Regional Express
- Founded: 1975; 51 years ago
- Ceased operations: 1996; 30 years ago
- Operating bases: Grand Island, Nebraska
- Fleet size: 3 different types of aircraft.
- Destinations: Midwest and Southern United States
- Headquarters: Grand Island, Nebraska

GP Express Airlines was a scheduled passenger commuter air carrier with its headquarters located in Grand Island, Nebraska The parent corporation of the airline began on-demand air charter operations in December 1975. In December 1985 the Department of Transportation notified GP AIR (the parent corporation) that its bid to provide Essential Air Service (EAS) service in the Midwest had been accepted, GP AIR subsequently created subsidiary GP Express in order to conduct these operations under 14 CFR Part 135.

By 1992, the airline had expanded to provide air service with many flights being operated under EAS contracts in Colorado, Nebraska, South Dakota, Minnesota, Iowa, Missouri, Kansas, Mississippi, Alabama, Georgia, and South Carolina, Service in the southern U.S. began on June 6, 1992. By 1993 the airline was operating several Cessna 402 twin prop aircraft in addition to eight Beechcraft Model 99 turboprops and five Beechcraft 1900C turboprops with the latter being introduced in 1990.

GP Express operated as a Continental Connection carrier in association with Continental Airlines at the major carrier's hub in Denver (DEN) beginning on March 9, 1994. GP Express replaced Britt Airways at Denver as Continental was disbanding its hub operation there. By October 30, 1994, Continental was down to only serving Denver from four U.S. airports while GP Express was continuing to run a full Continental Connection operation at Denver as well as limited operations at Kansas City and Omaha. During the next two years, GP Express subsequently discontinued all operations at Denver. The carrier then began feeder services in support of new Continental Lite operations at Greensboro, NC and Tampa, FL in 1995 but filed for bankruptcy and ceased operations a year later.

== Destinations in 1992 ==
According to a GP Express route map, the airline was operating two different route systems in 1992 as an independent air carrier with one located in the north central U.S. stretching from Minneapolis/St. Paul to Kansas City to Denver and the other located in the southeastern U.S. with the two route systems being separately operated:

=== North Central U.S. Destinations ===
- Alliance, NE
- Brookings, SD
- Chadron, NE
- Denver
- Des Moines
- Fairmont, MN
- Grand Island, NE - Headquarters
- Hastings, NE
- Huron, SD
- Kansas City
- Kearney, NE
- Lincoln, NE
- Mankato, MN
- McCook, NE
- Minneapolis/Saint Paul - Hub
- Mitchell, SD
- North Platte, NE
- Omaha
- Scottsbluff, NE
- Sidney, NE
- Worthington, MN

=== Southeastern U.S. Destinations ===
- Anniston, AL
- Atlanta - Hub
- Gadsden, AL
- Hattiesburg/Laurel, MS
- Hilton Head, SC
- Muscle Shoals, AL
- Tuscaloosa, AL

== Continental Connection service from Denver in 1994 ==
According to the Continental Airlines system timetable, GP Express was operating code sharing flights as Continental Connection on behalf of Continental Airlines with Beechcraft 1900C commuter turboprop aircraft flying nonstop or direct between Denver (DEN) and the following destinations on October 30, 1994:

- Amarillo, TX
- Casper, WY
- Cheyenne, WY
- Cody, WY
- Durango, CO
- Gillette, WY
- Grand Island, NE
- Grand Junction, CO
- Gunnison, CO
- Jackson Hole, WY
- Kearney, NE
- Lincoln, NE
- McCook, NE
- Montrose, CO
- North Platte, NE
- Omaha, NE
- Pueblo, CO
- Rapid City, SD
- Riverton, WY
- Rock Springs, WY
- Scottsbluff, NE
- Sheridan, WY
- Steamboat Springs, CO (served via the Yampa Valley Airport)
- Telluride, CO

The above referenced timetable also lists only four destinations served nonstop from Denver by Continental Airlines mainline jet service at this time: Chicago Midway Airport (MDW), Cleveland (CLE), Houston (IAH) and Newark (EWR), three of which were the location of Continental hubs in 1994.

== Accidents ==
GP Express Airlines was noted for an unusually high fatal accident rate for its fleet size and received additional FAA oversight as a result.

- On December 23, 1987 a GP Express Cessna 402 crashed on approach to Chadron, Nebraska. The crash resulted in fatal injuries to the two person flight crew and serious injuries to the only passenger.
- GP Express Flight 861 crashed near Anniston, Alabama on June 9, 1992, only two days after operations began in the GP Express Southern Region.
- On April 28, 1993, a GP Express Airlines Beechcraft Model 99 crashed near Shelton, Nebraska during execution of an aerobatic maneuver during a non-revenue check ride. Both pilots sustained fatal injuries.

== See also ==
- List of defunct airlines of the United States
