= Wayne Swinford =

American football defensive back and wide receiver

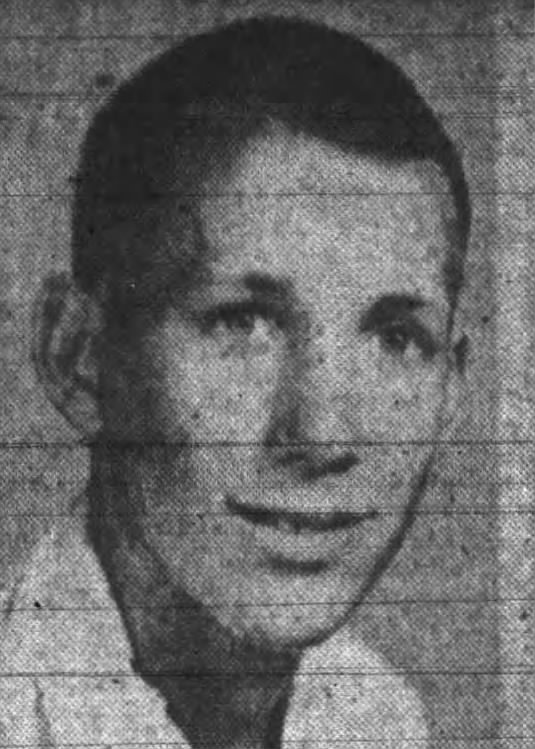
- Swinford in 1958

No. 23
- Positions: Defensive back Wide receiver

Personal information
- Born: May 3, 1943 (age 83); Anniston, Alabama, U.S.

Career information
- High school: Munford
- College: Georgia (1961–1964)

Career history
- San Francisco 49ers (1965–1967)
- Stats at Pro Football Reference

Lenis Wayne Swinford (born May 3, 1943) is an American professional football defensive back and wide receiver. He played for the San Francisco 49ers of the National Football League (NFL).

== Life and career ==
Swinford was born in Anniston, Alabama. He played high school football at Munford High School in Munford, Alabama. He then enrolled at the University of Georgia to play college football for the Georgia Bulldogs. He was on the freshman team in 1961, and was a three-year varsity letterman from 1962 to 1964.

In November 1964, Swinford was selected by the San Francisco 49ers of the National Football League (NFL) in the 9th round of the 1965 NFL draft, and he joined the team in December 1964. He played in fourteen games during the 1965 NFL season, and played in seven games during the 1966 NFL season. He was released from the team in September 1966, but was activated again in November 1966. He played in five games during the 1967 NFL season, and in October 1967, he was placed on the injured reserve list with a knee injury. He became a free agent on May 1, 1968.
