= Sarrell Dental & Eye Centers =

Sarrell Regional Dental Centers For Public Health
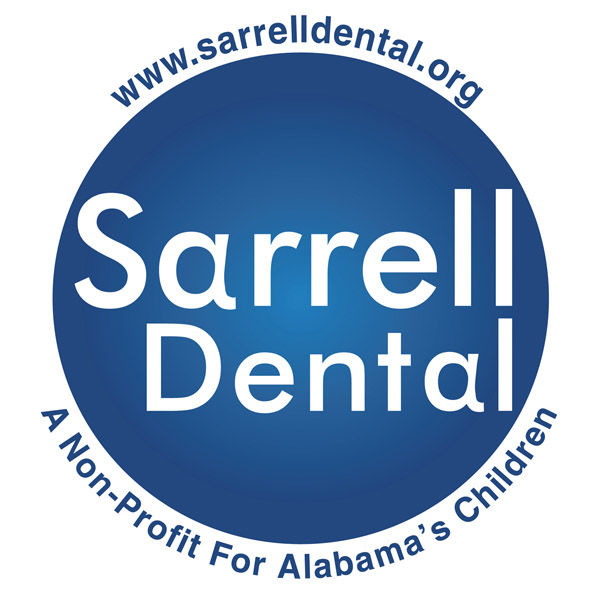
- Type: Nonprofit
- Industry: Dentistry; Optometry
- Founded: Anniston, Alabama (2004)
- Founder: Warren Sarrell
- Area served: Alabama
- Services: Dental & Eye Services
- Revenue: ▲US$ 16.1 million (FY 2012)
- Number of employees: 255 (August 2015)
- Website: www.sarrelldental.org

Sarrell Dental and Eye Centers, based in Anniston, Alabama, was the largest dental provider in the state of Alabama. Sarrell was organized as a non-profit 501(c)(3) tax-exempt organization in 2005, and operated 12 dental clinics, 4 clinics include vision care and a mobile dental bus. As of January 1, 2022, Sarrell Dental & Eye Centers rebranded to Advantage Dental+.

== Background ==
In 2004, retired cardiologist Warren Sarrell conducted a health assessment survey in Calhoun County, Alabama. The results of this survey showed an overwhelming need for more access to dental care, particularly among lower-income families eligible for Medicaid and ALLKids. To address this need, Sarrell worked with the Calhoun County Community Foundation to organize a dental clinic in Anniston, Alabama. In 2005, Sarrell contacted Jeffrey A. Parker, the Executive in Residence at Jacksonville State University, and asked him to help the struggling clinic. Upon Parker's arrival, the clinic became independent of the foundation and changed its name to The Sarrell Regional Dental Center for Public Health.

== Growth ==
Sarrell quickly began to experience growth, and by the end of 2005, Sarrell had opened additional offices in Heflin and Talladega. In December 2006, the Heflin office began offering optometry services in addition to dental care. Sarrell then partnered with the University of Alabama at Birmingham (UAB) to open the UAB Sarrell Dental Center in Bessemer, Alabama. In early 2007, Sarrell converted a bus into a fully operational mobile dental clinic. New fixed clinics have since opened in Alexander City, Athens, Attalla, Boaz, Clanton, Dothan, Enterprise, Foley, Leesburg, Montgomery, Pinson, Selma, Toney and Tuscaloosa.

Organizational Statistics

In September 2013, Sarrell Dental became a member of the DentaQuest Healthcare Delivery Group.

As of August 2015, the organization operated 17 fixed clinics, a mobile dental bus, and 4 eye offices in Alabama. Sarrell projects to see over 175,000 patient visits in 2015.

== Partnership ==
In October 2007, Sarrell formed a partnership with The University of Alabama at Birmingham's School of Dentistry (UABSOD). The agreement called for the Dental School to send students to the Sarrell clinics for training and clinical practice in a 'teaching-hospital' situation, according to John Thornton, UAB's Associate Dean for Community Affairs. The clinic and dental school operated together for the next two and a half years, until late March 2010. It was then, Sarrell Chairman Jeff Parker told the Anniston Star, that he learned UAB would be ending the relationship due to "intense pressure from UAB alumni who have threatened to withdraw funding" from the dental school. According to the Star, "In an e-mail to a Star reporter Monday, Dale Turnbough, the associate vice president of public relations at UAB, wrote, "We believe Sarrell has a laudable mission and is doing a great job, and we are grateful for the partnership we have had to date. But our primary consideration has to be how to best prepare our students, and what is the best learning environment for them." Jeff Parker, Chairman of Sarrell, and Brandi Parris, President of Sarrell, called it a culmination of an effort by some for-profit dentists to curtail Sarrell's operations statewide.

== Conflict and lawsuits with the Alabama Dental Association (ALDA) ==
In March 2010, Sarrell Dental filed a slander lawsuit against Steve Mitchell, DMD, Director of UABSOD's Pediatric Dentistry. The claim was based on a transcript of an ALDA meeting in January where participants allegedly discussed ways to curb the success of Sarrell and other non-profits. Meeting participants, including Mitchell, complained about perceived "unfair" advantages for non-profits and discussed possible legislation to restrict their growth. In April, after UABSOD withdrew its students from the Sarrell clinics, Sarrell filed an additional lawsuit against ALDA for its "illegal conspiracy" to drive Sarrell out of business. Subsequently, the Federal Trade Commission launched an investigation into whether ALDA had engaged in unfair competition or deceptive acts against Sarrell. In June 2011, after passage of House Bill 451 in the 2011 Alabama legislative session, Sarrell dropped all lawsuits as a goodwill gesture.

== PBS Frontline ==
In the June 26, 2012 episode of PBS's Frontline series titled "Dollars and Dentists," Frontline correspondent Miles O'Brien examined different models of dental services that were attempting to address the access to care issue faced by the majority of Medicaid recipients in America. Jeffrey Parker was interviewed to discuss how Sarrell Dental had become one of the few working models nationwide to see growing success. Parker offered the Sarrell Dental model as a replicable system that could offer a critical component to national oral healthcare reform, while also inviting other dentists to learn from their success: "Who can be against a model that is eliminating decay? ... they need to come see it, they need to adopt it, it works."

== Awards and honors ==
Sarrell has received several honors and awards, including:

- NFL Alumni - Atlanta Chapter - Selected as an outstanding organization 2006–present
- Alabama Head Start Association - Recipient of 2010, 2012, 2013, 2014 Alabama Head Start Corporate Award
- National Children's Oral Health Foundation - Selected as a National Affiliate of the Year in 2010
- Best of Calhoun County - Recognized for 2011 Best Place to Work, Best Dentist and Best Eye Care
- Web Marketing Association - Recipient of 2011 WebAward for Outstanding Achievement
- Kentucky Dental Association - Sarrell CEO authors cover story in July/August 2012 newsletter
- HOLA Latino - Recipient of the 2013 Social Services Award
- Robert Wood Johnson Foundation - Featured in a systematic report that assessed the Sarrell Dental model for innovative health care improvements in 2013 report
- Forbes - Featured as a disruptive innovator for better health care
- Ashoka: Innovators for the Public - Selected as the 2nd Place Winner of Transforming Health Systems: Gamechanging Business Models
- Slate - Recognized for Sarrell's innovative business model in January 2015 publication
