= Bynum, Alabama =

- Neighborhood of Oxford, Alabama; Former Census-designated place
- Location in Calhoun County and the state of Alabama
- Coordinates: 33°36′47″N 85°57′40″W
- Country: United States
- State: Alabama
- County: Calhoun

Area
  - Total: 3.3 sq mi (8.5 km^{2})
  - Land: 3.3 sq mi (8.5 km^{2})
  - Water: 0 sq mi (0 km^{2})
- Elevation: 600 ft (180 m)

Population (2000)
  - Total: 1,863
  - Density: 568/sq mi (219.2/km^{2})
- Time zone: UTC-6 (Central (CST))
  - Summer (DST): UTC-5 (CDT)
- ZIP code: 36253
- Area code: 256
- FIPS code: 01-11128
- GNIS feature ID: 0159290

Bynum is a former census-designated place in Calhoun County, Alabama, United States. At the 2000 census the population was 1,863. The area is now part of the city of Oxford and is included in the Anniston–Oxford, Alabama Metropolitan Statistical Area.

== Geography ==
Bynum is located in the westernmost part of the city of Oxford and is bordered to the north by the Anniston Army Depot.

According to the U.S. Census Bureau, the community had a total area of 3.3 square miles (8.5 km^{2}), all land, prior to being annexed by Oxford.

== Demographics ==
Historical population
Census	Pop.	Note	%±
1980	2,235		—
1990	1,917		−14.2%
2000	1,863		−2.8%
U.S. Decennial Census

=== Racial and ethnic composition ===
Bynum town, Alabama – Racial and ethnic composition Note: the US Census treats Hispanic/Latino as an ethnic category. This table excludes Latinos from the racial categories and assigns them to a separate category. Hispanics/Latinos may be of any race. Race and ethnicity were not surveyed for populations under 2,500 in 1980 and under 1,000 in 1990.
Race / Ethnicity (NH = Non-Hispanic)	Pop 1990	Pop 2000	% 1990	% 2000
White alone (NH)	1,703	1,606	88.84%	86.21%
Black or African American alone (NH)	194	184	10.12%	9.88%
Native American or Alaska Native alone (NH)	5	13	0.26%	0.70%
Asian alone (NH)	3	3	0.16%	0.16%
Native Hawaiian or Pacific Islander alone (NH)	x	0	x	0.00%
Other race alone (NH)	0	1	0.00%	0.05%
Mixed race or Multiracial (NH)	x	30	x	1.61%
Hispanic or Latino (any race)	12	26	0.63%	1.40%
Total	1,917	1,863	100.00%	100.00%

=== 2000 census ===
As of the census of 2000, there were 1,863 people, 734 households, and 546 families residing in the community. The population density was 564.4 inhabitants per square mile (217.9/km^{2}). There were 772 housing units at an average density of 233.9 per square mile (90.3/km^{2}). The racial makeup of the community was 86.96% White, 9.98% Black or African American, 0.70% Native American, 0.16% Asian, 0.54% from other races, and 1.66% from two or more races. 1.40% of the population were Hispanic or Latino of any race.

There were 734 households, out of which 32.3% had children under the age of 18 living with them, 59.8% were married couples living together, 11.2% had a female householder with no husband present, and 25.5% were non-families. 21.7% of all households were made up of individuals, and 8.3% had someone living alone who was 65 years of age or older. The average household size was 2.54 and the average family size was 2.94.

The age distribution of the population shows 23.7% under the age of 18, 10.1% from 18 to 24, 29.0% from 25 to 44, 25.6% from 45 to 64, and 11.6% who were 65 years of age or older. The median age was 37 years. For every 100 females, there were 95.1 males. For every 100 females age 18 and over, there were 95.7 males.

The median income for a household in Bynum was $34,375, and the median income for a family was $41,439. Males had a median income of $32,479 versus $23,452 for females. The per capita income for the community was $17,194. About 9.5% of families and 10.5% of the population were below the poverty line, including 18.1% of those under age 18 and 4.2% of those age 65 or over.
