= Areawide Community Transportation System =

Provider of mass transportation in Calhoun County, Alabama

- Locale: Anniston, Alabama
- Service area: Calhoun County, Alabama
- Service type: Bus service, paratransit
- Routes: 4
- Hubs: Anniston station
- Fleet: 4 buses
- Annual ridership: 153,669 (2023)
- Website: Areawide Community Transportation System

Areawide Community Transportation System is the primary provider of mass transportation in Anniston and Oxford, Alabama, with four routes serving the region. It is a service of the East Alabama Regional Planning and Development Commission. As of 2023, the system provided 153,669 rides over 37,074 annual vehicle revenue hours with 4 buses and 24 paratransit vehicles.

== History ==
Public transit in Anniston began with horsecars in 1887, with the Anniston Street Railway Company. In 1896, streetcars began plying the streets, although these would be replaced by buses by 1932.

== Service ==
Areawide Community Transportation System operates four hourly bus routes on a pulse system with routes departing the Multimodal Station on the hour. Regular fares are $1.00.

=== Routes ===
- East Route
- North Route
- South Route
- West Route

== Fixed route ridership ==
The ridership statistics shown here are of fixed route services only and do not include demand response services.

== See also ==
- List of bus transit systems in the United States
- Anniston station
