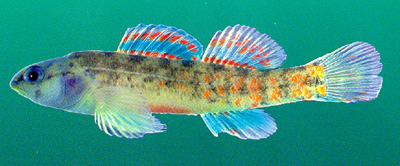
- Photo courtesy of the Geological Survey of Alabama

Conservation status
- Endangered (IUCN 3.1)

Scientific classification
- Kingdom: Animalia
- Phylum: Chordata
- Class: Actinopterygii
- Division: Teleostei
- Order: Perciformes
- Family: Percidae
- Genus: Etheostoma
- Species: E. nuchale

Binomial name
- Etheostoma nuchale W. M. Howell & R. D. Caldwell, 1965

= Watercress darter =

Species of fish

The watercress darter (Etheostoma nuchale) is a species of freshwater ray-finned fish, a darter from the subfamily Etheostomatinae, part of the family Percidae, which also contains the perches, ruffes and pikeperches. It is endemic to the eastern United States where it is only known from the Black Warrior River drainage basin near Birmingham, Alabama.

== Description ==
This species can reach a length of 5.4 centimetres (2.1 in) TL though most only reach a length of around 3.5 centimetres (1.4 in).

== Distribution and habitat ==
The watercress darter is only known to exist in four specific bodies of water, two in the Watercress Darter National Wildlife Refuge and two at the Seven Springs in the Powderly neighborhood of Birmingham. The Seven Springs populations were discovered in 2003. The species can be found in the watercress zone of springs where the water is slow-moving. They are usually found in dense mats of watercress or other aquatic vegetation, where they rest on the leaves and stems well above the stream bed. They feed on snails, crustaceans, and insect larvae in slow-moving water.

== Conservation and status ==
The species is endangered and is protected in areas such as the Watercress Darter National Wildlife Refuge in Jefferson County. The IUCN lists it as being "Endangered" due to its small range, small total population size and vulnerability to deterioration in the quality of the water in the springs in which it occurs.

On September 22, 2008, more than 12,000 watercress darters were killed when workers from the city of Birmingham removed a beaver dam at Roebuck Springs, emptying a pond that was the darters' habitat. An alternative solution would have been to install a flow device in the dam to regulate the pond height. The pond was emptied because it often flooded a nearby tennis court. The city emptied the beaver pond without the permission of the US Fish and Wildlife Service (FWS). The FWS has ordered the dam to be restored and the pond refilled in an effort to save the remaining darters.

The Alabama Department of Conservation and Natural Resources is suing the City of Birmingham for destroying endangered species and their wetland habitat.
