= Anniston Normal and Industrial School =

American school in Anniston, Alabama (1898–c.1915)

Location
- 323 Walnut Avenue, Anniston, Alabama, United States; 33.649008°N 85.833384°W

Information
- Other names: Anniston Normal and Industrial College
- School type: Black elementary school Private
- Religious affiliation: Baptist
- Established: 1898
- Founder: A.A. Battle
- Closed: c. 1915

The Anniston Normal and Industrial School (1898 – c. 1915) was a segregated private school for African-Americans in Anniston, Alabama, US. Initially a parochial school affiliated with the Baptists.

== History ==
The school was founded by A.A. Battle, and was funded by the Baptists. It was opened eight months a year, and was operated by Black people. Former principals of the Anniston Normal and Industrial School included E.B. Knight, and Charles H. Hayes.

During its brief history of operation, the school experienced multiple fires. It closed due to lack of enrollment and funding issues.
