= German Italian Memorial Cemetery =

World War II cemetery in Fort McClellan, Alabama

- Interactive map of German Italian Memorial Cemetery

Details
- Established: 1943
- Location: Fort McClellan; 3541 Shipley Drive; Anniston, Alabama
- Country: United States
- Coordinates: 33°43′04″N 85°48′37″W
- Type: Military
- Owned by: United States
- Size: 29 graves (26 German; 3 Italian)
- Find a Grave: German Italian Memorial Cemetery

The German Italian Memorial Cemetery at the Fort McClellan United States Army post is the burial site for 26 German and three Italian World War II enemy combatants who had been interned at Fort McClellan at their time of death. The rules and practices of disposing of deceased enemy combatants is dictated by International Humanitarian Law, as agreed upon by the 1929 and 1949 Geneva Conventions treaties.

Adjacent to the city of Anniston, Alabama, the cemetery is often referred to by other names: Fort McClellan EPW Cemetery, Prisoner of War Cemetery, McClellan's German Italian Memorial Cemetery, the German Italian Memorial Cemetery, or simply the German Italian Cemetery. This cemetery was initially created for only the deceased German prisoners, but the Italian cemetery was closed prior to the death of three Italian prisoners.

Fort McClellan Post Cemetery is one of 21 American cemeteries listed by the Department of Veterans Affairs (VA) as containing interments of prisoners of war (POW) for one, or both, world conflicts. Twenty-one VA cemeteries contain the remains of more than 1,000 World War II POWs; two more also contain the remains of World War I POWs.

Following the end of the three-year (June 1940 through 13 May 1943) North African campaign, Fort McClellan opened two prisoner of war (POW) camps, to accommodate 3,000 prisoners. One was for the Germans, and the other for the Italians. Of those, 26 Germans and three Italians died while being held. Only one of those was death by suicide.

Each deceased prisoner was given a funeral and a headstone for his grave, the same as Americans who died. Intended to be solely a German prisoner of war cemetery, the three Italians died too late to be buried in the closed Italian prisoner of war cemeteries at Fort McClellan, and were subsequently buried with the Germans.

== See also ==
- List of World War II prisoner-of-war camps in the United States
