= Anniston station =

Amtrak station in Anniston, Alabama

Anniston, AL
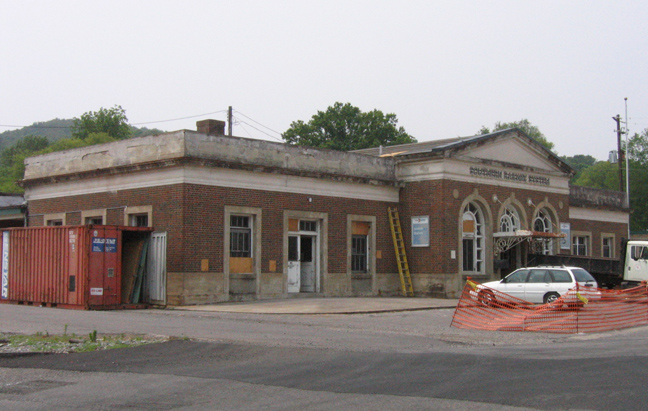
- Street side of the station during the 2008 restoration

General information
- Location: 126 West 4th Street; Anniston, Alabama; United States
- Coordinates: 33°38′57″N 85°49′56″W
- Owner: City of Anniston
- Line: Norfolk Southern Railway
- Platforms: 1 side platform
- Tracks: 3
- Connections: ACTS

Construction
- Parking: 10 short and 5 long term spaces
- Accessible: Yes; wheelchair lift

Other information
- Status: Unstaffed
- Station code: Amtrak: ATN

History
- Rebuilt: April–September 26, 1926
- Original company: Southern Railway

Passengers
- FY 2025: 4,338 (Amtrak)

Services
| Preceding station | Amtrak | Following station |
|---|---|---|
| Birmingham toward New Orleans | Crescent | Atlanta toward New York |
Former services
| Preceding station | Southern Railway | Following station |
|---|---|---|
| Bynum toward Birmingham | Main Line | De Armanville toward Washington, D.C. |
| Oxanna Junction toward York | York – Rome | Letchers toward Rome |
Location

Anniston station is an Amtrak train station at 126 West 4th Street in Anniston, Alabama. It is served by the Crescent passenger train. The station was originally designed by Milo R. Hanker and built in 1925 for the Southern Railway, and was one of the last railroad-operated active passenger stations in the country, as the Southern Crescent (predecessor to the current Amtrak train) was still operated by the Southern well into the Amtrak era.

In 2008, the city completed a full rehabilitation of the classical revival depot, primarily using funds obtained through the Federal Highway Administration's Transportation Enhancements (TE) program.
