= Mountain Longleaf National Wildlife Refuge =

National Wildlife Refuge in northeastern Alabama

- IUCN category IV (habitat/species management area)
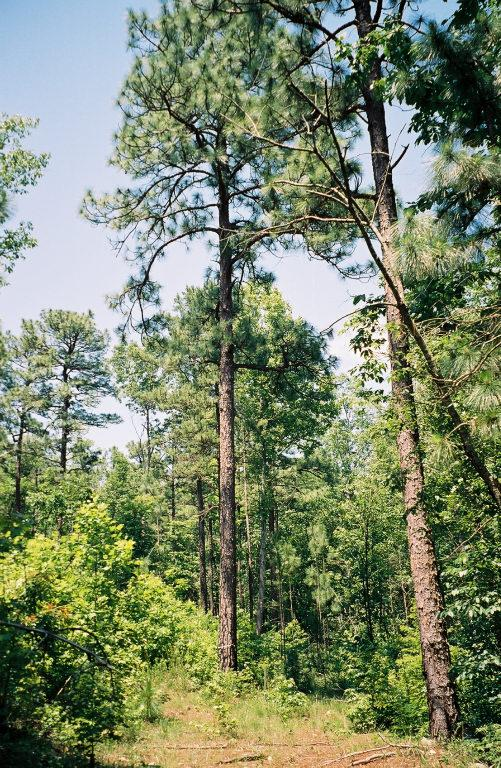
- Longleaf pine (Pinus palustris)

- Location within the United States Location within Alabama
- Location: Calhoun County, Alabama, United States
- Nearest city: Anniston, Alabama
- Coordinates: 33°41′49″N 85°45′07″W
- Area: 9,015.68 acres (36 km^{2})
- Established: 2003
- Governing body: U.S. Fish and Wildlife Service
- Website: Mountain Longleaf NWR

The Mountain Longleaf National Wildlife Refuge is a 9,016-acre (36 km^{2}) National Wildlife Refuge located in northeastern Alabama near the city of Anniston on the former site of Fort McClellan. Its name comes from some of the last remaining montane longleaf pine (Pinus palustris) ecosystem in the southeastern United States which the refuge protects.

Approximately 3,000 acres (12 km^{2}) of the refuge are open to the public during daylight hours. The remaining acreage will open after clean-up of environmental contaminants has been completed. The facility has a small, two-person staff with an annual budget of US$250,000. Plans call for a budget of approximately US$900,000 with a ten-person staff. The Mountain Longleaf National Wildlife Refuge also administers the Cahaba River National Wildlife Refuge and Watercress Darter National Wildlife Refuge.

== Topography ==
The Mountain Longleaf National Wildlife Refuge is located on the former military training grounds of Fort McClellan. The refuge is located on the Choccolocco mountain range, in the southern portion of Ridge and Valley of the Appalachians. It is a part of the Talladega National Forest.

== Wildlife and protected species ==
The refuge serves as a home to multiple endangered species, including the red-cockaded woodpecker, the gray bat, plus 21 species of fauna which are considered rare.

Plant species warranting special attention include the longleaf pine (Pinus palustris), the white fringeless orchid, and 11 species of flora which are considered rare.

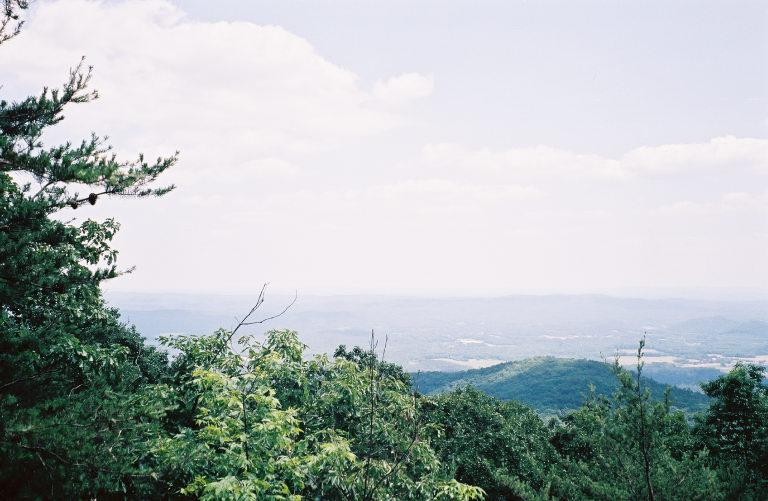

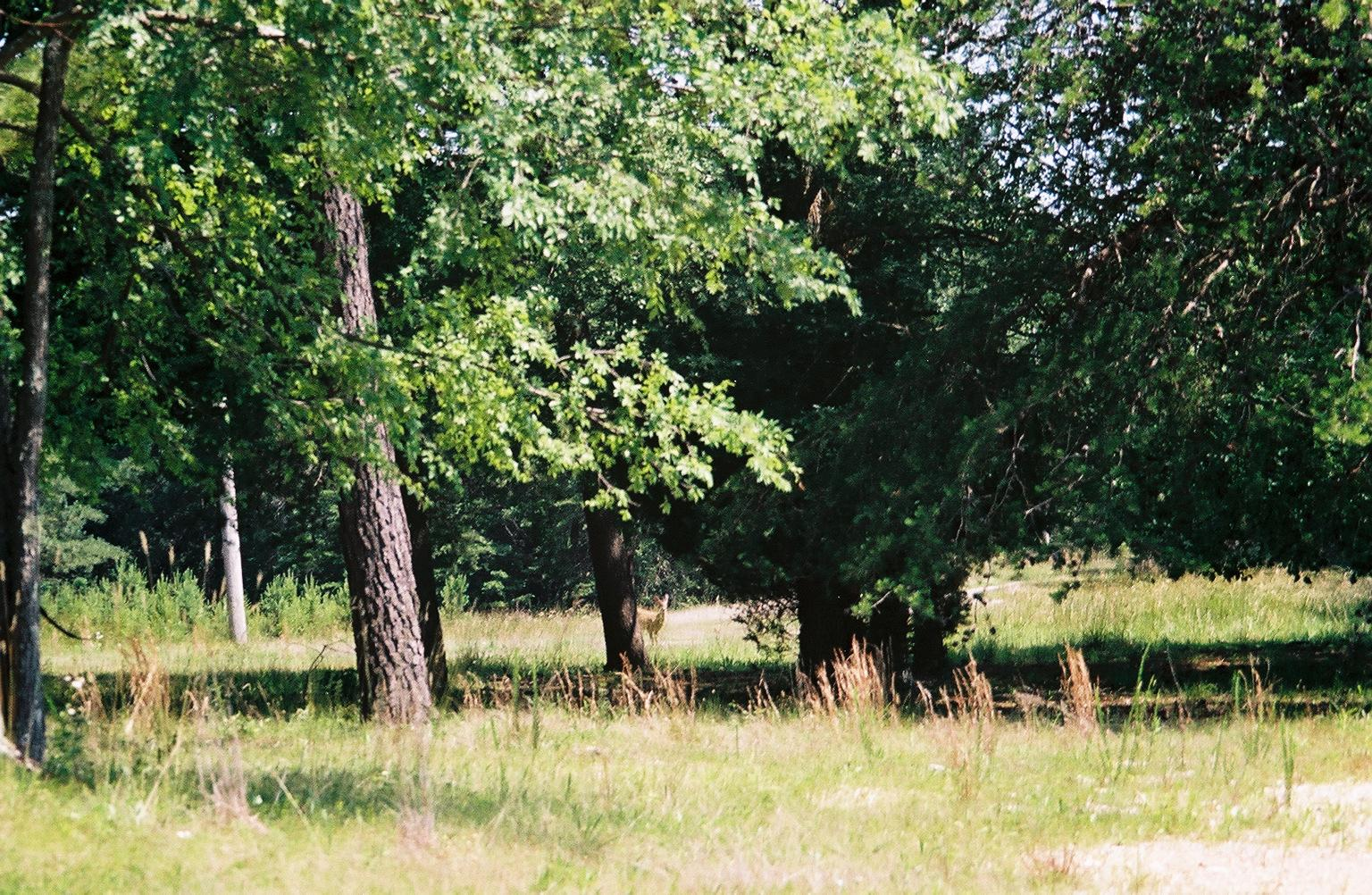

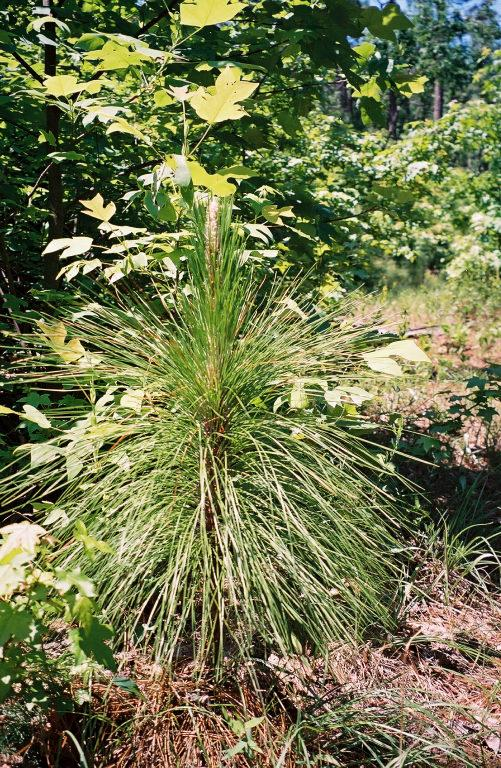

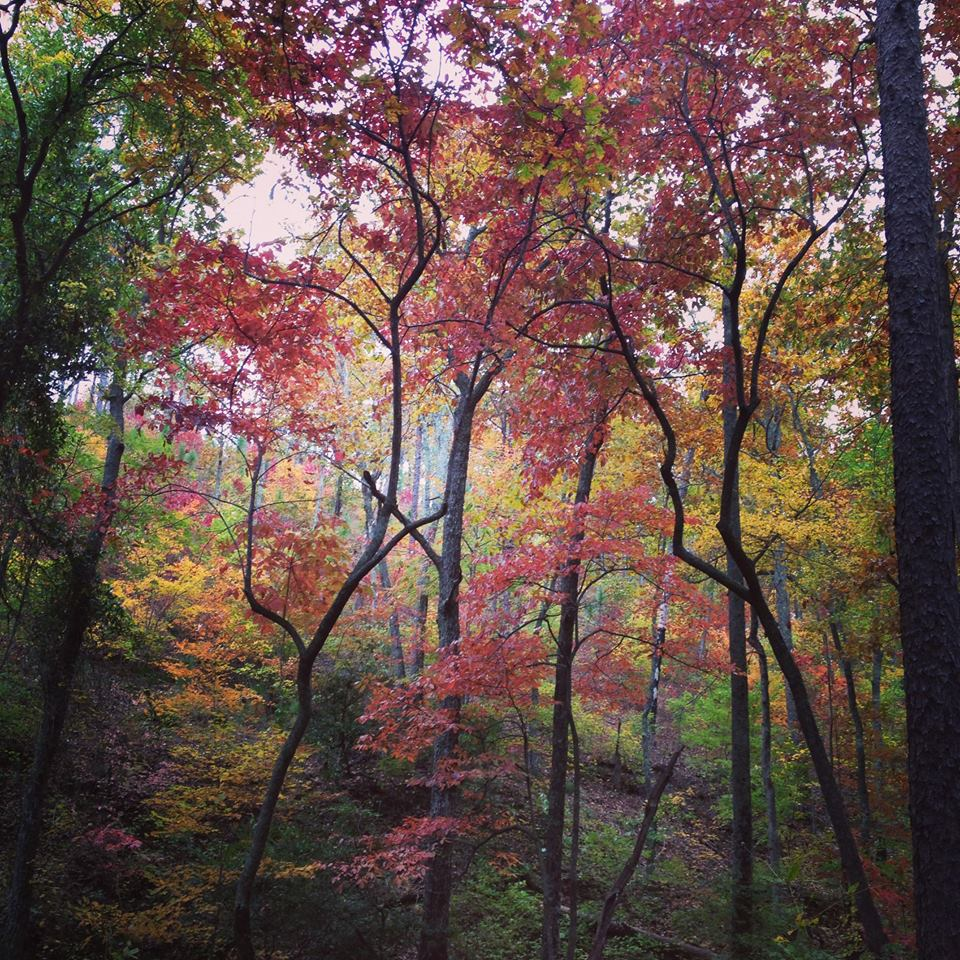

== Facilities ==
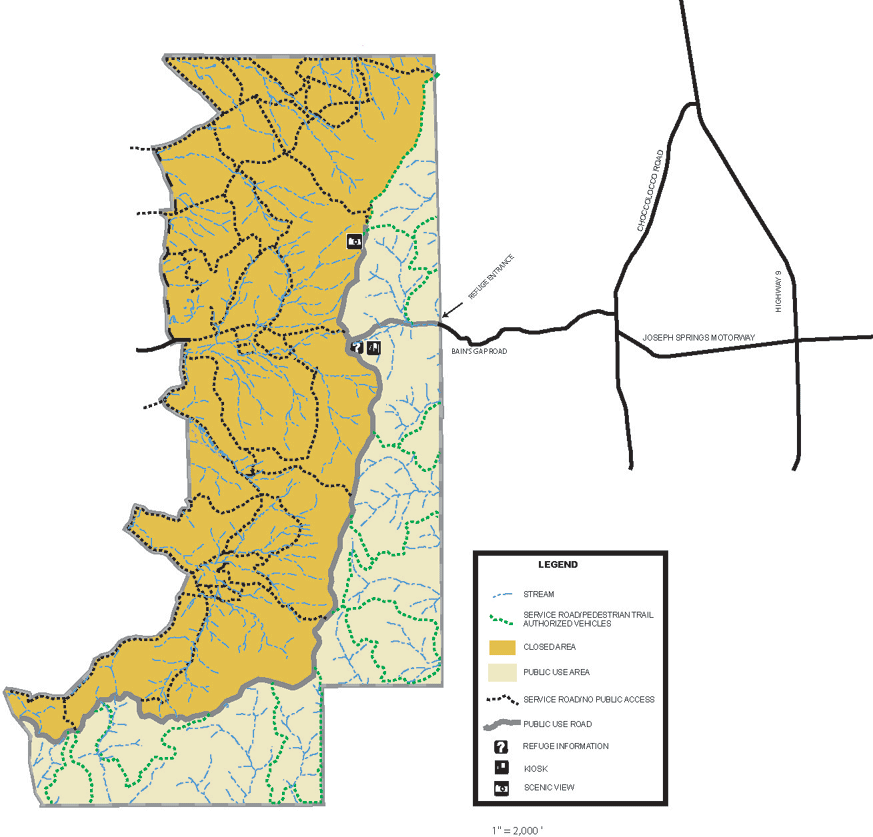
Map of Mountain Longleaf NWR

The Mountain Longleaf National Wildlife Refuge is a relatively new wildlife refuge, and as such has not yet developed any sizable tourist facilities. A single information kiosk for hunters is located at the junction of Bain's Gap Road and Ridge Road South. Additionally, part of the reserve is closed to the general public pending environmental cleanup. Otherwise, there are limited opportunities for hiking, photography, and wildlife observation at the refuge.

== See also ==
- List of National Wildlife Refuges
