= Anniston Army Depot =

United States Army production facility

- Bynum, Alabama
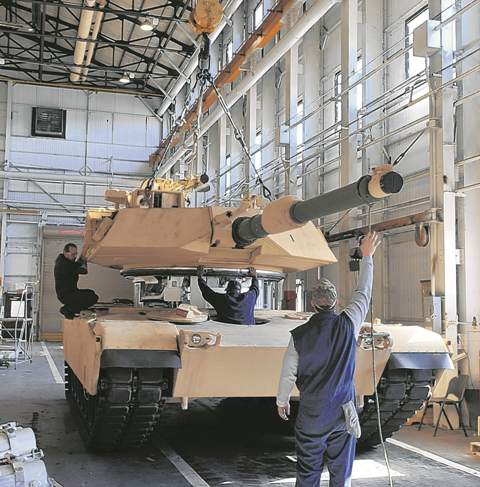
- Mechanics at Anniston Army Depot line up an M1 Abrams turret with its hull.

Site information
- Controlled by: United States Army: U.S. Army Materiel Command; U.S. Army Tank-automotive and Armaments Command

Location
- Location within Alabama
- Coordinates: 33°39′08″N 85°57′44″W

Site history
- Built: 1940
- In use: 1940–present

Garrison information
- Current commander: Colonel Craig A. Daniel

Airfield information
- Identifiers: FAA LID: 04AL
- Elevation: 686 feet (209 m) AMSL
Helipads
Number	Length and surface
H1	100 by 75 feet (30 m × 23 m) Asphalt

Anniston Army Depot (ANAD) is a major United States Army facility for the production and repair of ground combat vehicles and the overhaul of Small Arms Weapon Systems. It was previously used for the storage of chemical weapons, at Anniston Chemical Activity. The depot is located in Bynum, Alabama.

The Department of the Army established the site in 1940, buying 10,640 acres (4,310 ha) in Calhoun County, where Anniston is the county seat. The site was originally a munitions storage facility, and, later, a disposal facility.

ANAD was placed on the Superfund National Priorities List in 1990 because of soil and groundwater contamination with antimony, chromium, lead, thallium and trichloroethylene.

== Geography ==
The depot is located in Calhoun County, Alabama, 10 miles (16 km) west of Anniston. It covers 25 square miles (65 km^{2}) of land, or 15,200 acres (6,200 ha). Its northern side is the Pelham Range portion of Fort McClellan. The central and northern portions of the depot span over 13,000 acres (5,300 ha) and serve as an ammunition storage area. The southern side of the depot is the Southeastern Industrial Area (SIA), a 600 acres (240 ha) industrial operations area with more than 50 buildings and a vehicle test track.

== Description ==
As of 2014, the depot employs 3,800 civilian workers. Tanks and other equipment are repaired and tested, but historically Anniston's main role since World War II has been as a major munitions storage site. Anniston is one of seven depots in the United States where chemical weapons were stored (7.2% of nation's chemical weapons stockpile). The stockpile has included rockets, bombs, projectiles, and land mines armed with Sarin, VX nerve agent, or mustard gas. The last chemical munitions were destroyed in September 2011.

ANAD is the only depot capable of performing maintenance on heavy-tracked combat vehicles and their components and houses a state of the art 250,000 square feet (23,000 m^{2}) Small Arms Overhaul facility, which opened in January 2012 to replace an outdated facility. The depot is designated as the Center of Technical Excellence for the M1 Abrams Tank and is the designated candidate depot for the repair of the M60 Patton tank, AVLB (Armoured vehicle-launched bridge), M728 Combat Engineer Vehicle, M88 Recovery Vehicle and M551 'Sheridan' Armored Reconnaissance/Airborne Assault vehicles. During the Iraq War, over 1,000 M1 tanks, Howitzers, and other armored vehicles were stored awaiting re-engineering.

ANAD is the Army's primary site for final assembly, reset, and overhaul for the Stryker family of wheeled fighting vehicles. All ten of the Stryker vehicle variants are assembled in the Nichols Industrial Park area by contractor General Dynamics − Land Systems. Stryker battle damage repair and reset is accomplished through a work sharing arrangement between the depot and contractor, including a Stryker Exchange Program that converts the original flat bottomed Stryker vehicle to the IED-resistant Double V Hull configuration developed for combat operations in Afghanistan.

The depot houses and operates a facility for the repair, restoration, and/or upgrade of infantry weapons such as the Beretta M9 pistol, M16 rifle, and M2 machine gun. Any firearm deemed unusable or obsolete is destroyed on the premises, the materials are reduced to unusable pieces and then sold for scrap to be melted down.

== Organizational structure ==
ANAD is under command of the US Army TACOM Life Cycle Management Command (TACOM LCMC), although other operators on the facility include the Defense Logistics Agency, Defense Reutilization and Marketing Office, United States Army Center of Military History, Health Services Command, Soldier and Biological Chemical Command, and the Civilian Marksmanship Program.

== Environmental problems ==
In 1989, the EPA placed part of the Depot on the National Priorities List (NPL), and one year later, the EPA and the Army agreed to address the entire Depot under the Superfund for antimony, chromium, lead, thallium and trichloroethylene in ground water and soils. Since then, contaminated ground water has been pumped and treated, contaminated soil has either been dug up or capped, and land use controls have been put in place. Contaminated fractured bedrock needs to be addressed. Since 1998, the Depot has a Restoration Advisory Board (RAB) composed of community members and representatives from the Depot and other agencies. Removal from NPL is expected in 2047.
