= KANB (Louisiana) =

Radio station in Shreveport, Louisiana, 1957–1962

KANB (1300 AM) was a radio station located in Shreveport, Louisiana, which signed on February 15, 1957, and shut down on February 18, 1962. Its license was deleted July 31, 1967. The station’s callsign was KLUE from 1957 until 1958. From October 1958 until its final sign off, the station broadcast all-Negro programming. It was a daytime-only radio station.
