= Anniston Chemical Activity =

Coordinates: 33°37′36″N 85°59′9″W

Anniston Chemical Activity was a U.S. Army chemical weapon storage site located in Alabama. The Army had stored approximately seven percent of the nation’s original chemical weapons stockpile at the Anniston Army Depot since the early 1960s. In August 2003, the Army began disposing of these weapons at the Anniston Chemical Agent Disposal Facility. Destruction of the base's stockpile of VX was begun on July 23, 2006. By December 2008, all of the VX on site had been destroyed. Destruction of mustard-filled munitions began on July 2, 2009 after several months of retooling. By July 2010, it had destroyed by incineration 75% of the depot's total stockpile including all 437 tons (397 metric tons) of GB (sarin) and all VX nerve agent on site. On September 22, 2011, the last mustard gas shells were burned, completing chemical weapons disposal at the facility. The facilities were scheduled for dismantlement by about 2013 and some of the weapon-handling equipment was planned for transfer to the depots at Kentucky and Colorado. Local government emergency departments are expecting to lose millions in annual funding from the federal government related to the presence of the chemical depot and as many as 1000 jobs will be cut on the base. According to the US Army Corps of Engineers the disposal and closure of Anniston Chemical Activity were completed on May 7, 2013. Following the closure, other uses for the incinerators were explored, but ultimately they were demolished.

The U.S. Army's Chemical Materials Agency destroyed by incineration (total):661,529 Chemical Munitions and 482,051 Gallons of Chemical Agent

- 299,727 mustard filled mortars and 187,548 mustard gallons
- 219,374 VX agent munitions and 196,925 US gallons (745,440 L) of VX
- 142,428 GB munitions and 96,078 US gallons (363,690 L) of GB
