= Anniston Regional Airport =

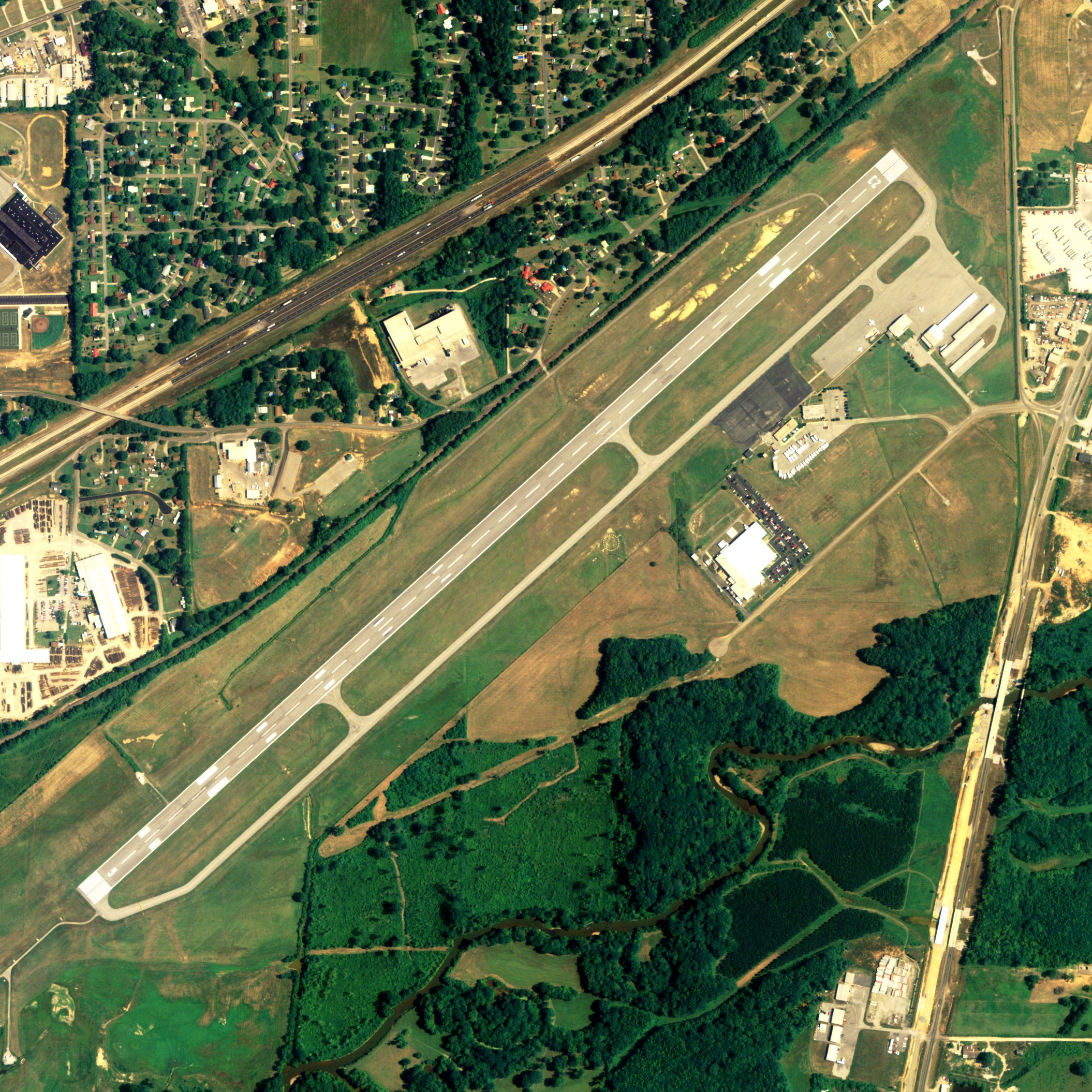
- NAIP aerial image, 2006
- IATA: ANB; ICAO: KANB; FAA LID: ANB

Summary
- Airport type: Public
- Owner: City of Anniston
- Serves: Anniston, Alabama
- Elevation AMSL: 612 ft (187 m)
- Coordinates: 33°35′17″N 085°51′29″W
- Website: www.annistonal.gov/airport/

Map
- Location of airport in Alabama ANB (the United States)

Runways
Direction	Length		Surface
Direction	ft	m	Surface
5/23	7,000	2,134	Asphalt

Statistics (2017)
- Aircraft operations (2015): 23,107
- Based aircraft: 27
- Source: Federal Aviation Administration

Anniston Regional Airport (IATA: ANB, ICAO: KANB, FAA LID: ANB), formerly known as Anniston Metropolitan Airport, is a city-owned public-use airport located five nautical miles (6 mi, 9 km) southwest of the central business district of Anniston, a city in Calhoun County, Alabama, United States. It is included in the National Plan of Integrated Airport Systems for 2011–2015, which categorized it as a general aviation airport.

== Facilities and aircraft ==
Anniston Regional Airport covers an area of 596 acres (241 ha) at an elevation of 612 feet (187 m) above mean sea level. It has one runway designated 5/23 with an asphalt surface measuring 7,000 by 150 feet (2,134 x 46 m).

For the 12-month period ending April 30, 2012, the airport had 33,644 aircraft operations, an average of 92 per day: 71% general aviation, 15% military, 14% air taxi, and <1% scheduled commercial. At that time there were 32 aircraft based at this airport: 50% single-engine, 31% multi-engine, 6% jet, 6% glider, and 6% ultralight.

== Incidents ==
Anniston Metropolitan Airport was the intended destination of GP Express Flight 861, which crashed about 7.5 miles (12.1 km) northeast of the airport on June 8, 1992.

== See also ==
- List of airports in Alabama
