= Fort McClellan =

United States Army post in Alabama

Coordinates: 33°42′39″N 85°44′14″W

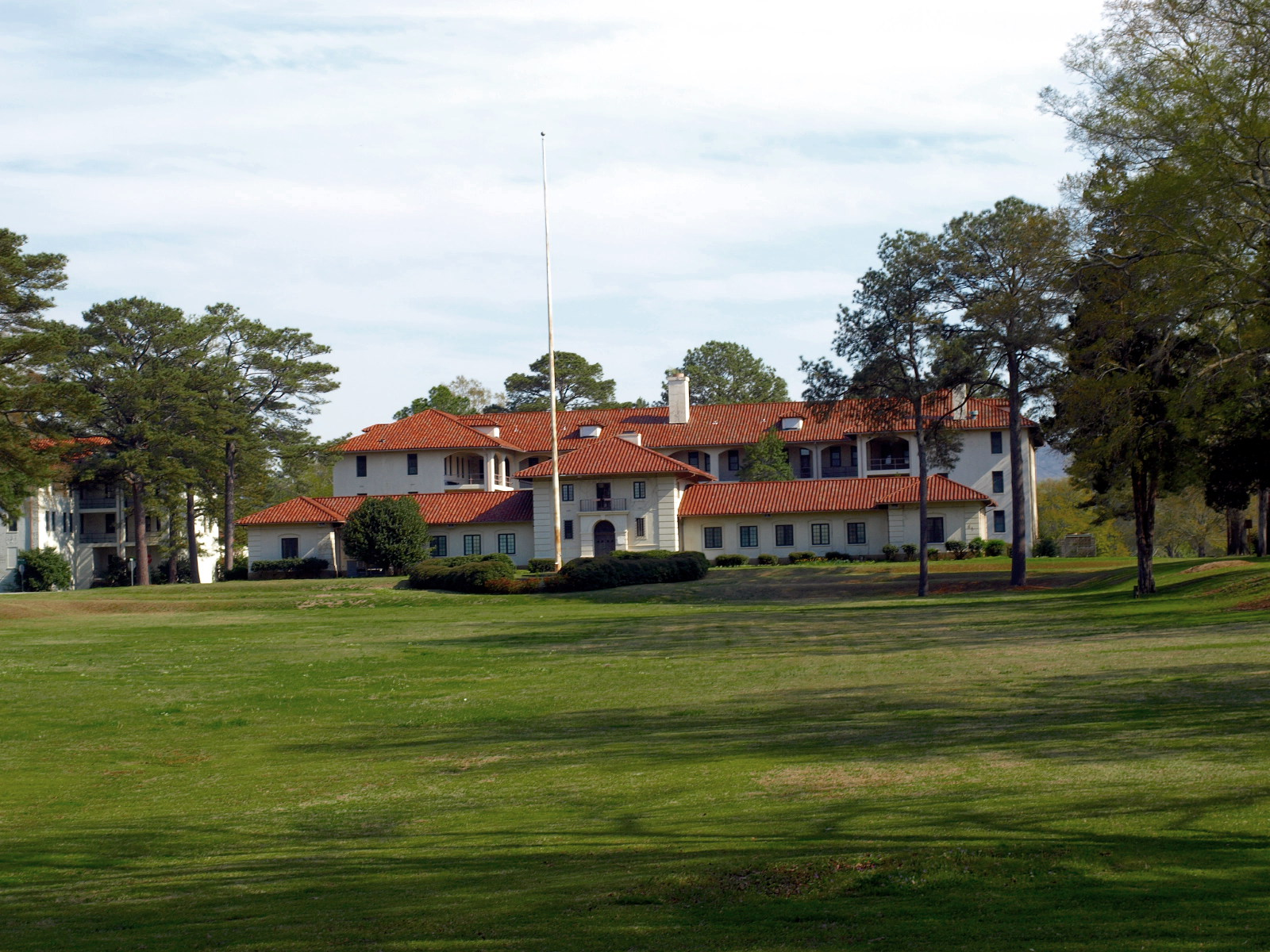
Buckner Hall at Fort McClellan in 2014.

Fort McClellan, originally Camp McClellan, is a United States Army post located adjacent to the city of Anniston, Alabama. During World War II, it was one of the largest U.S. Army installations, training an estimated half-million troops. After the war it became the home of the Military Police Corps, the Chemical Corps and the Women's Army Corps. From 1975 until it was closed in 1999, Fort McClellan was home of the Military Police Corps and the One Station Unit Training (OSUT) Military Police School. Also after World War II until it was closed in 1999, it was home of the Chemical Corps School, which trained soldiers in chemical warfare. In 1988, Fort McClellan was used as an alternate training academy for the United States Border Patrol. Before its closure by the 1995 Base Realignment and Closure Commission (BRAC), the post employed about 10,000 military personnel (half of whom were permanently assigned) and about 1,500 civilians. It underwent unexploded ordnance clean up from 2003 to 2014. Since 2010, about 3,000 acres of the post's brownfield land have been redeveloped as a mixed-use community. The portion of the post which has not been redeveloped is currently owned by the Alabama Army National Guard and is used as a training facility for units from all across the state, also housing the Alabama Army National Guard's Officer Candidate School, for enlisted soldiers looking to earn their commission.

== Early history ==
Located in the Choccolocco Foothills of the Appalachian Mountains, Woodstock, Alabama, was founded as a private industrial town by the Woodstock Iron Company in 1872. Woodstock was later renamed Anniston and was opened to the public in 1883; by 1890, it had a population of near 10,000 persons. While Fort McClellan was the first and only long-lived United States Army post near Anniston, a temporary facility named Camp Shipp existed there during 1898–1899.

=== Camp Ship – Spanish–American War ===
The Spanish–American War ended in 1898, but with a final peace settlement still in the future, the U.S. Army had an immediate need for a facility to quarter a Military reserve force from Alabama should the hostilities start anew. Anniston was on a north–south railroad that continued to Mobile, Alabama, a major seaport for Cuba-bound departures, and successfully sought the reserve facility. Camp Shipp was established in August 1898 within the northwest city limits of Anniston; an artillery range was planned to be on the nearby Blue Mountain. By October, nearly 10,000 troops of the 3rd Alabama Volunteer Infantry were at Camp Shipp, but by the end of the year they began to rapidly move out. The camp never fully realized its intended purpose; it was used temporarily as a hospital for patients of the influenza epidemic sweeping Army posts, and then phased out in March 1899. The camp was named for Lt. William E. Shipp of the 10th Cavalry Regiment who was killed in action at Santiago, Cuba while leading a charge in the Battle of San Juan Hill.

=== Camp McClellan – World War I ===
In 1912, there was renewed interest in Anniston for having a nearby Army training facility. Alabama's Third District congressman Henry D. Clayton Jr. brought to the Department of War's attention the potential of the Choccolocco Mountains for artillery training. Twenty-thousand National Guardsmen were sent to the area for maneuvers. Officials of the participating Army War College found the terrain highly suitable for artillery training, and advocated purchase of the land.

On March 17, 1917, the Federal Government acquired 18,952 acres (76.70 km^{2}) of this land for $247,000 (equivalent to $6,207,078 in 2025). On April 6, 1917, Congress declared war on Germany and it has been suggested that without it "it's likely that Fort McClellan as we remember it would never have been born". The Department of War formally established Camp McClellan on July 18, 1917, named in honor of Major General George B. McClellan, General-in-Chief of the Union Army, 1861–1862. Camp McClellan was one of 32 mobilization camps formed to quickly train men for World War I.

Like the other National Guard mobilization facilities, Camp McClellan used hastily constructed wooden buildings for headquarters, mess halls, latrines, and showers, with rows of wooden-floored tents for housing the troops. There were 26 blocks of training areas composed of central buildings and tents, each designated for a particular function (infantry, artillery, ammunition, etc.). Overall, about 1,500 buildings were built, including a base hospital with 118 buildings. The Anniston city limit at that time was a circle 1.3 miles (2.1 kilometers) in diameter. The Camp McClellan reservation was approximately a square some 3.0 miles (4.8 kilometers) on each side, adjoining the northeast quarter arc of the city limits and extending northward along the Anniston to Jacksonville, Alabama, pike. The training blocks were in the northern part of the reservation. An existing Southern Railway line was close by the western boundary; a terminal facility called Remount Depot was built near the southwest corner of the reservation and, farther north, a spur into the camp was constructed.

The first troops arrived in late August 1917; by October there were more than 27,000 men from units in New Jersey, Virginia, Maryland, Delaware, and the District of Columbia training at the camp under the 29th Infantry Division, commanded by Major General Charles G. Morton. Other troops included the 1st Separate Negro Company of Maryland, the 6th Division, the 157th Depot Brigade, the 11th and 12th Training Battalions, and the 1st, 2nd, and 3rd Development Regiments.

=== Fort McClellan – permanent post ===
Following the Armistice with Germany on November 11, 1918, and the signing of the Treaty of Versailles (June 18, 1919) officially ending the war, most of the mobilization camps were closed. Nine facilities were placed on "caretaker status"; Camp McClellan was included, intended to be used as a "corps area training center" providing training to Reserve Officers' Training Corps (ROTC) cadets and Organized Reserve units from North Carolina, South Carolina, Georgia, Alabama, Florida, Mississippi, Tennessee, and Louisiana. Congress and the public had little interest in military affairs, including maintaining these camps (much less in upgrading them as permanent facilities), and the training centers were closed in 1922, soon after they opened. In 1926, however, Congress approved funds for permanent facilities, and new buildings were started at Camp McClellan for the headquarters, officer quarters, barracks, and a central hospital. On July 1, 1929, by War Department order, the post was designated Fort McClellan and a permanent installation. This would be a post for one regiment of Infantry having 1,500 officers and men and a summer Citizens' Military Training Camp with a capacity of 6,400 civilian trainees.

As the Great Depression started, unspent funds initially allocated for military construction were diverted into programs to stem the unemployment. Construction on the permanent facilities slowed, but in 1933, President Franklin D. Roosevelt allocated Works Progress Administration (WPA) funds for Fort McClellan. In the next three years, an estimated $1,785,000 (equivalent to $41,414,568 in 2025) in WPA funds was used for constructing new roads, the Fort McClellan Army Airfield, and additional permanent buildings. Included was a radio facility with a high-power transmitter (call letters WUR) for Morse-code communications, Most of the buildings were Spanish Colonial Revival architecture in style.

During the 1930s, the 3rd Battalion, 22nd Infantry Regiment, had the role of post garrison, responsible for training ROTC cadets, Organized Reserve units, and overseeing the annual encampments of National Guard units there, primarily from the Alabama National Guard. In addition, the post garrison maintained the headquarters for District "D" of the Civilian Conservation Corps (CCC), handling 45 camps in Alabama, Florida, Mississippi, and Tennessee.

== World War II ==
As World War II approached, the facilities at Fort McClellan underwent considerable expansion. Although the central area of permanent buildings remained the headquarters, many new temporary wooden buildings were constructed and all of the buildings remaining from World War I were upgraded. In October 1940, the 27th Infantry Division of the New York National Guard was inducted into federal service and sent to Fort McClellan. New housing for trainees was not yet available; the majority of the men of the 27th lived in tents until leaving at the start of the war in December 1941, and were soon deployed throughout the Pacific Theater of Operations.

=== Major expansion (1941–44) ===
About $6.5 million in Federal Funding was made available for construction to accommodate quarters and other facilities for up to 50,000 military personnel at Fort McClellan. Overall improvements included 74 miles (118 km) of new roads, sewage facilities for 50,000 persons, a huge general hospital with 80 wooden buildings connected by 4.5 miles (7.2 km) of catwalks, 5 theaters plus an amphitheater seating 12,000 persons, 27 warehouses, and many ammunition–storage bunkers. Hundreds of five- and fifteen-man hutments, arranged in Company-level groups, were built for personnel being trained. Colonel John L. Jenkins was the Commanding Officer (1941–1944) during most of the construction period.

The land area of Fort McClellan was also greatly expanded. Directly to the east, a mountainous peninsula connecting to the Talladega National Forest was acquired, allowing access to this Federal Area for training maneuvers. This increased the reservation to a total of 42,286 acres (169.1 km^{2}). A few miles to the west, a 22,168-acre (86.7-km^{2}) tract was purchased for $675,000 and used for artillery and heavy mortar ranges, tank firing, and bivouac areas. This is directly north of another Army facility, the Anniston Army Depot. The range was initially called Morrisville Maneuvering Area and later changed to Pelham Range, named for John Pelham, a hero in the Confederate cavalry during the American Civil War, who was raised in that area.

At peak, there were officially 2,170 officers and 42,126 enlisted personnel at Fort McClellan. The station complement tripled in number; this complement included two detachments of the Women's Army Corps (WAC). In the war years, a total of nearly 500,000 men were trained at Fort McClellan.

=== Basic and special training ===
Replacing the 27th Division, in 1942, the Army began training new recruits and draftees at Fort McClellan under what was called the Branch Immaterial Training Center. Recruits received eight weeks of basic training, and were then sent elsewhere for combat training or specialized schools. In 1943, this became the Infantry Replacement Training Center (IRTC). Under IRTC, the basic training was increased to nine weeks and included situations corresponding to combat in European areas such as training within simulated urban areas, actions under live artillery fire, and crouching in foxholes with tanks moving overhead.

In addition to the IRTC, there was training at Fort McClellan of special troops such the 92nd Infantry Division with African-American soldiers from all states. The 92nd Division trained during 1942–1943, then were deployed overseas to fight in Italian campaigns.

=== Prisoner of war camp ===
During the war, Fort McClellan became the temporary home for many captured enemy soldiers; a 3,000-capacity Prison Internment Camp for prisoners of war (POWs) was built in 1943. The camp also served to receive prisoners who would go on to three other POW camps in Alabama. At the end of the war in Europe, the camp at Fort McClellan held 2,546 men. A cemetery on the reservation marks 26 German and 3 Italian prisoners of war who died while in captivity.

== Post–World War II missions ==
After the war ended with Germany and Japan, the IRTC at Fort McClellan trained soldiers for occupation duty until November 1946, at which time the activity was redesignated a Recruit Training Center. The number of troops being trained dwindled rapidly, and the installation was placed on inactive status on June 30, 1947; only a small maintenance crew remained on the post.

Under pressure from the Alabama Congressional Delegation, in early 1950, the Army began plans to again use the area for National Guard training. With the onset of the Korean War in June 1950, these plans were accelerated. Brigadier General Theodore R. Wessels was assigned as Commander (1950–1952) and $10,000,000 (equivalent to $133,817,427 in 2025) in funds were allocated for facility restoration. In 1951, Fort McClellan was officially reactivated, with missions to have a National Guard Training Brigade and to operate the Chemical Corps replacement training center. Wessels is often called the "Father of the New Fort McClellan."

=== Chemical Corps ===
Funding was appropriated to build specialized facilities at Fort McClellan for what was initially called the Chemical Corps School (CCS). In 1952, the CCS began operations and facilities were completed in 1954. The CCS offered eight weeks of basic training followed by eight weeks devoted to chemical warfare training.

In September 1953, Operation Top Hat was conducted at the CCS. Highly secret at the time, and very controversial when revealed, Top Hat used Chemical Corps personnel to test decontamination methods for biological and chemical weapons, including sulfur mustard and nerve agents.

In 1962, the name of the CCS was changed to the U.S. Army Chemical Center and School. Also in 1962, the U.S. Army Combat Development Command Chemical Biological-Radiological Agency, moved to Fort McClellan. In 1973 both of these operations were relocated to Edgewood Arsenal, Maryland, aka Aberdeen Proving Ground. In 1979 the moves were reversed, with the U.S. Army Chemical School (ACS) relocating from Edgewood to Fort McClellan. After reorganizing, the ACS provided numerous courses for officers, non-commissioned officers, and initial-entry soldiers, ranging from general in nature to highly technical. Several allied countries sent their military to train at the School. Upon base closure in 1999 it was transferred to Fort Leonard Wood, Missouri.

In 2017–2018, H.R. 3666, The Fort McClellan Health Registry Act, was introduced to Congress, aiming to establish a registry of persons who were exposed to chemical agents during their military service at Fort McClellan.

=== Military Police Corps ===
The Military Police Corps is one of the youngest branches of the U.S. Army, being officially established in September 1941. A Military Police School, earlier operating at Fort Gordon, Georgia, was officially transferred to Fort McClellan on July 11, 1975.

The Military Police School provided training programs in general policing activities, corrections and detention operations, police and criminal intelligence operations, combat support operations, and security. The School also operated the Department of Defense Polygraph Institute. The Military Police School was transferred to Fort Leonard Wood, Missouri, in 1999.

=== Women's Army Corps ===
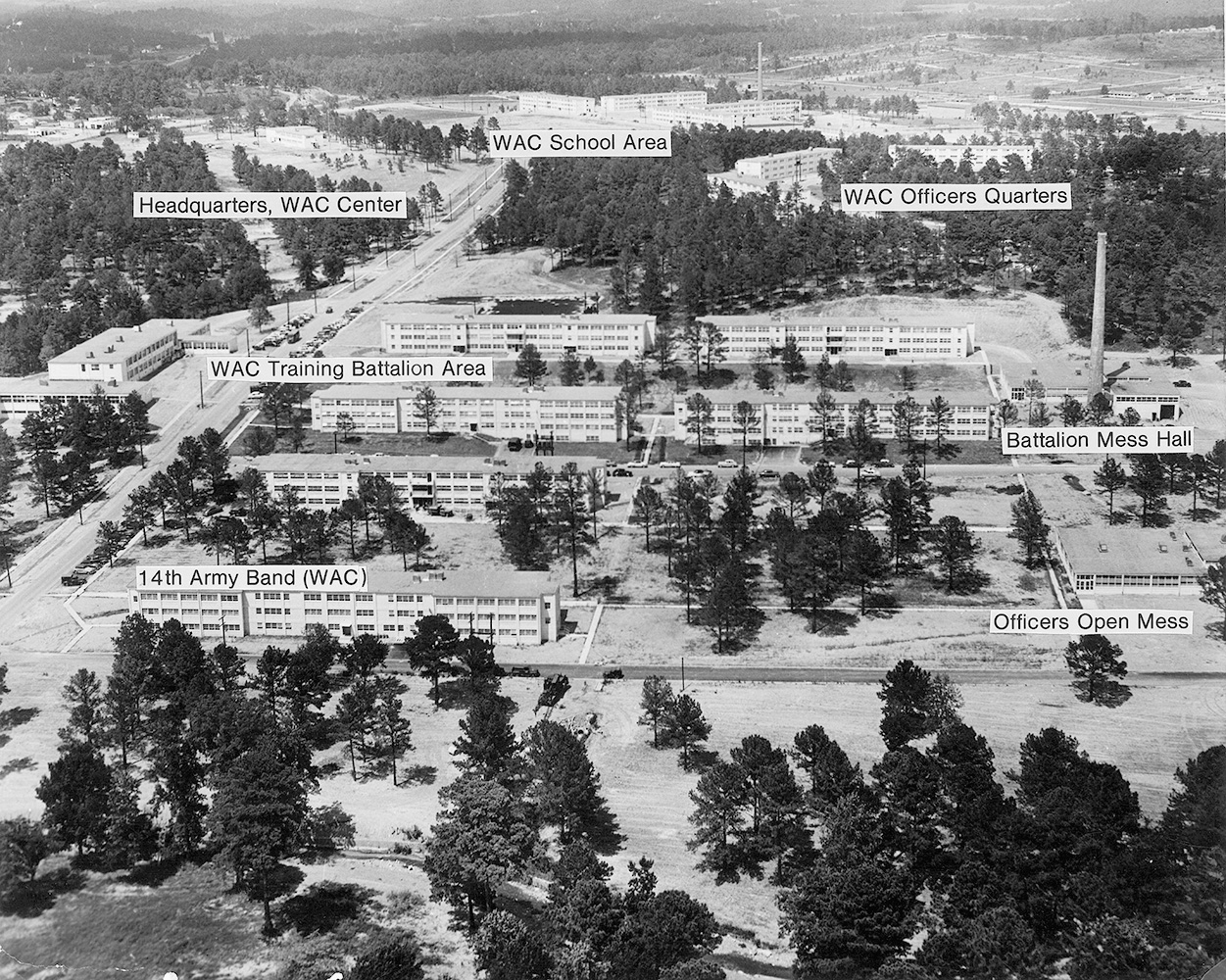
WAC Area, Fort McClellan, 1954

The Women's Army Corps (WAC) was the women's branch of the U.S. Army. In 1942 it was created as an auxiliary unit, the Women's Army Auxiliary Corps (WAAC) and converted to the WAC in 1943. The Women's Army Corps School was founded at Fort McClellan on September 25, 1952.

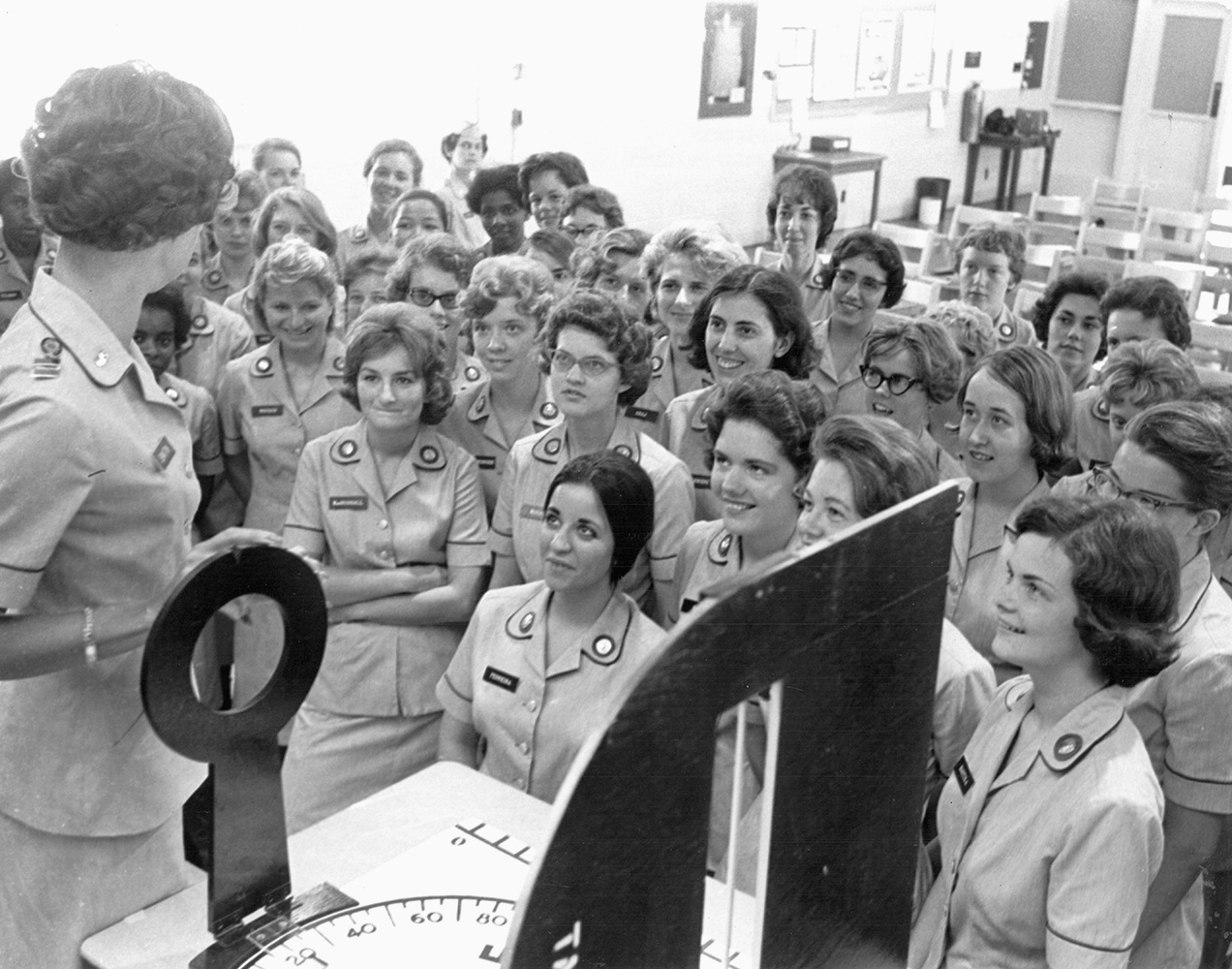
College juniors in a map reading course at WAC School, Fort McClellan, instructed by Capt. Ann B. Smith, July 1964.

About two years later, official ceremonies were conducted to establish the post as the first permanent home of the U.S. Women's Army Corps Center, the WACC. The WAC provided the receiving, processing, and training operations for all female officers and enlisted personnel entering the U.S. Army. Civilian summer training was also conducted at the WAC during the 1950s. Fort McClellan remained its home until the Corps was disestablished and its flag retired in 1978. Participating in the final ceremony was Major General Mary E. Clarke, the last director of the Women's Army Corps and soon appointed the Commanding General of Fort McClellan (1978–1980), the first female officer ever to command a major U.S. Army installation.

=== Vietnam War training ===
In 1966, to meet special infantry needs of the Vietnam War, an Advanced Individual Training Infantry Brigade was activated at Fort McClellan. The Fort was renamed the U.S. Army School/Training Center and Fort McClellan. During 1969, this Training Brigade, along with the Women's Army Corps Center and the Army Chemical School, made Fort McClellan the only U.S. Army installation in the United States with three major missions. After training more than 30,000 men forces in Vietnam were reduced, and the Training Infantry Brigade was deactivated in April 1970.

=== US Border Patrol training ===
The Immigration Reform and Control Act of 1986 authorized the hiring of 500 additional United States Border Patrol Agents. The original Border Patrol academy was not able to accommodate such a large class size, so a satellite academy was built on Fort McClellan. The 226th class of Border Patrol basic training was the only class to utilize the satellite academy. Despite plans for additional basic training classes, the Border Patrol never returned and the idea was abandoned.

== Closing and present use ==
During the last decades of the 20th century, Fort McClellan was 'home' for an average military population of about 10,000 people, including about 5,000 who were permanently assigned, and employed about 1,500 civilians.

In 1995, the Base Realignment and Closure (BRAC) Commission voted to permanently close Fort McClellan. No Troops were sent to this base after 1995 due to it being closed, except for basic training, the chemical school and the MP school. The official closing ceremony was held on May 20, 1999, at which Major General Ralph G. Wooten, Commanding General and Chemical School Commandant (1996–1999), conveyed thanks from the Department of the Army to Fort McClellan and the surrounding communities:

For more than 81 years, Fort McClellan set the standard of excellence in training America's sons and daughters to defend freedom in two world wars and a myriad of conflicts and operations. In the last generation, we were singularly responsible for providing our Army with the world's finest military police and chemical soldiers. Our pride is justified by our spectacular success!

— Major General Ralph G. Wooten, Fort McClellan Closing Ceremony, 20 May 1999

At the time of closure, Fort McClellan was home to the U.S. Army Chemical School, the U.S. Army Military Police School, the Training Brigade, and the Department of Defense Polygraph Institute. The Chemical School, Military Police School, and the Training Brigade relocated to Fort Leonard Wood, Missouri, integrating with their Engineer School to form the U.S. Army Maneuver Support Center of Excellence. The DoD Polygraph Institute relocated to Fort Jackson, South Carolina.

=== Military and governmental occupants ===
A portion of Fort McClellan continues to be operated by the Alabama National Guard including the Fort McClellan Army National Guard Training Center for field training, as well the Alabama National Guard Officer Candidate School. AAFES still runs a post exchange. Fort McClellan is also home to the Center for Domestic Preparedness (CDP) of the Department of Homeland Security. The Noble Training Facility (NTF) was integrated into the CDP training center.

=== McClellan community ===
In early 1999, the local community leaders of Anniston and Calhoun County established the Fort McClellan Joint Powers Authority for the purpose of overseeing the redevelopment and reuse of Fort McClellan. On April 30, 2009, Alabama Governor Bob Riley signed into law Act # 2009-337 authorizing "the incorporation of development authorities for the purpose of developing real and personal property of closed military installations in Alabama." In March 2010, the McClellan Development Authority was officially certified as a non-profit public corporation charged with the future economic development of the former fort. In 2014, ordnance cleanup was completed after 11 years of environmental remediation. As of September 2015, more than 3,100 acres are back in use 3,000 are for sale, and a little more than 3,000 acres are set to go up for sale in the next three to five years.

Carved from the developed portions of the original reservation, McClellan is a 10,000-acre (40.0-km^{2}) master-planned, mixed-use community offering opportunities for residential, commercial, industrial, retail, education, research, and technology development. Since its opening, McClellan has become home to over 900 residents and a work place for more than 3,000 employees.

=== Mountain Longleaf National Wildlife Refuge ===
In 2003, the U.S. Fish and Wildlife Service, an agency of the U.S. Department of the Interior, established the Mountain Longleaf National Wildlife Refuge on 9,016 acres (36.1 km^{2}) in undeveloped land on the reservation of the former Fort McClellan. It takes its name from some of the last-remaining mountain longleaf pine (Pinus palustris) forests in the southeastern United States.

As a relatively new wildlife refuge, Mountain Longleaf has not yet developed any sizable tourist facilities. A single information kiosk is located at the junction of Bain's Gap Road and Ridge Road South, near the center of the McClellan community. Additionally, part of the reserve is closed to the general public, pending environmental cleanup. Otherwise, there are limited opportunities for hiking, photography, and wildlife observation at the refuge. Work is underway to restore the environment from the ecological problems introduced by the long use of the area for Army field training.

=== Public health issues ===
Recently the Veterans Administration has established a page under the heading "Potential Exposure at Fort McClellan - Public Health" That page in part, states the following: "Some members of the U.S. Army Chemical Corp School, Army Combat Development Command Chemical/Biological/Radiological Agency, Army Military Police School and Women's Army Corps, among others, may have been exposed to one or more of several hazardous materials, likely at low levels, during their service at Fort McClellan".

In 2016, a group of former service veterans from Fort McClellan compiled original environmental engineering sources papers that strongly indicates that the Fort was a former remote test location for the Chemical Weapons experiments program out of Edgewood, Maryland and the former Biowarfare Germ Program out of Fort Detrick, Maryland. The veterans are currently working towards obtaining a new GAO Office report on the spill sites at the base, to confirm whether or not it was a part of the infamous PROJECT 112 battery of military experiments that started up in the 1960s. Fort McClellan was also the site of open air burn pits that were used in staging the CBRNE tests around the base until 1975. Potential exposures could have included, but are not limited to, the following: Radioactive compounds (cesium-137 and cobalt-60) used in decontamination training activities in isolated locations on base; Chemical warfare agents (mustard gas and nerve agents) used in secret military experiments and CBRNE field tests on the troops without ever warning them; friable indoors asbestos pollution inside the barracks buildings which all required remedial cleanup actions; a (TCE) SuperFund contamination site at the Anniston Army Depot where commuter workforce veterans worked who were living at the barracks at Fort McClellan; and full-face exposures to CS Riot Control gas for military qualifying classes. There was also a regional-sized PCB contamination zone from 1950 to 1998 stemming from a Monsanto Factory in the neighboring town where Fort McClellan soldiers had to use public travel stations, and a retail district that soldiers used for their off-duty hours. There was also a total of three landfills which were found to be toxic and leaching which required remedial cleanup actions. Fort Detrick had also used the site for spraying germ warfare bacteria spores around the base without ever coordinating with other service units. The McClellan Vets group points to this Bacillus spraying as a direct match to the other CBRNE test sites that included PROJECT SHAD.

To date, there are a total of ten significant environmental spill sites that have been identified by the medical patient group of the Fort McClellan service veterans. The veterans argue that the sciences for toxicity have changed over the years, and that multiple or mixtures or combinations of low-dose exposures are just as harmful to human health as short bursts of high-dose events.https://www.gao.gov/products/NSIAD-98-228

In 2008, the Environmental Protection Agency issued a final Pathways Report on the Aroclor PCB contamination zone caused by a former Monsanto Factory, and the Fort McClellan Veterans are covered by the exposed population declarations in this report under the defined category of "Commercial Visitors". http://www.annistoncag.org/uploadedFiles/Final_Pathways_Analysis_Report%20%20Nov%2008(1).pdf To date, the Dept. of Veterans Affairs has refused to acknowledge or comply with this important toxic exposure declaration. The Dept. of Veterans Affairs has repeatedly refused to do any health studies whatsoever on the Fort McClellan service veterans, and then has tried to use the patient lockout as their reason to not acknowledge that the soldiers are actually a toxic exposure patient group. In 2015 it was discovered that the VA didn't even know how to conduct a national Cumulative Health Risk Assessment on the veterans, and were still holding onto the obsolete patient screening practices of "aggregate" or single-source toxic assessments. The service veterans contend that their illnesses are a medical match to the industry known health risks from each of the ten toxic spill sites that makes up their exposure profile. Clinical lab testing for the veterans is not a viable detection option because they have been away from the original toxic sources at Fort McClellan for a time that exceeds the active Half-Life period for all of the known toxic sources at the base.

Historical population
Census	Pop.	Note	%±
1970	5,334		—
1980	7,605		42.6%
1990	4,128		−45.7%
U.S. Decennial Census

== See also ==
- German Italian Memorial Cemetery
