= Choccolocco Creek =

River in central Alabama, United States

- Etymology: Muskogean: chahko lago ("big shoals/house")

Location
- Country: United States
- State: Alabama

Physical characteristics
- Source
  - location: Near Liberty Hill, Alabama
  - elevation: 643.61 ft (196.17 m)
- Depth
  - maximum: 11.95 ft (3.64 m)
- Discharge
  - location: Choccolocco, Alabama; 33°39′48″N 85°41′16″W
  - maximum: 6,860 cu ft/s (194 m^{3}/s) (May 4, 1957)

Basin features
- Progression: Choccolocco Creek → Coosa River → (joins Tallapoosa River) → Alabama River → Mobile Bay → Gulf of Mexico
- River system: Middle Coosa subbasin hydrologic unit

The Choccolocco Creek is one of two main tributaries of the Coosa River in central Alabama. The watershed of the creek comprises 246,000 acres (376 mi^{2}) of drainage area. The waterway runs through the Talledega National Forest (also referred to as Choccolocco Management Area), and crosses through Calhoun, Talladega, and Cleburne counties, in central Alabama.

== Hydrology and etymology ==
The headwaters of the creek are located in the Appalachian Mountains near Liberty Hill, Alabama, in the Talladega National Forest. The origin of the creek's name is from the Muskogean chahko lago, meaning "big shoals" or "big house".

== Ancient sites ==
The Choccolocco Creek Archaeological Complex near Boiling Spring, Alabama, (Note: Boiling Spring is a few miles east of present day Oxford, Alabama.) contains the remains of at least one temple and three burial mounds, and is an important piece of the history of early Middle Woodland period inhabitants in the area. There are indications of land usage along the creek stretching back to the Archaic Period (8,000 BC), that includes evidence of extended habitation by the Mound Builders and peoples of the Mississippian culture.

Creek Chief Selocta Chinnabby's village was located on the north shore of Choccolocco Creek near the influx of Wolfskull Creek, (Note: Wolfskull Creek joins Choccolocco Creek six miles east of Oxford.) An ally of the U.S., and a friend to Andrew Jackson during the War of 1812, in 1813 he and his tribe helped build a defensive stockade just three miles north of the settlement. Completed in 1813, the fort was known as Fort Chinnabee. Another Native American village further down stream, Estaboga, means "where the people reside" in the Muscogee language. It is today an unincorporated community in Talladega County. Following the Indian Removal of 1836, the creek valley was quickly settled by White settlers.

== Condition ==
The creek is home to over 70 species, several of which are endangered, including the pygmy sculpin (Cottus paulus), the holiday darter (Etheostoma brevirostrum), and the blue shiner (Cyprinella caerulea). The wicker ancylid (Rhodacmea filosa)—a freshwater snail once thought extinct —was surprisingly (due to episodic heavy water pollution events on the waterway) found in the creek in 2011, and is still extant as of 2023. Environmental concerns in creek pollution have been focused primarily on discharges of Polychlorinated biphenyl (PCBs) into Snow Creek, a feeder stream of the Choccolocco, from the Monsanto plant that had operated at Anniston, Alabama from 1935 to 1971. The dumping and discharges have badly damaged the creek's ecosystem. There were still signs of continuing damage through at least 2007.

== See also ==
- Chinnabee, Alabama
- Choccolocco Council
- List of rivers of Alabama
