= Alabama State Route 200 =

State highway in Alabama, United States

State Route 200
- Tom Bible Memorial Highway

Route information
- Maintained by ALDOT
- Length: 1.011 mi (1.627 km)
- Existed: 1962–2019

Major junctions
- South end: SR 21
- North end: US 278

Location
- Country: United States
- State: Alabama
- Counties: Calhoun

Highway system
- Alabama State Highway System; Interstate; US; State
← SR 199	→ SR 201

State Route 200 (SR 200) was a 1.011-mile-long (1.627 km) route that served as a connection between State Route 21 and U.S. Highway 278 through western Piedmont in Calhoun County.

== Route description ==
This route used to serve as a western bypass of the city of Piedmont. The southern terminus of SR 200 was located at its intersection with SR 21 in southwest Piedmont. From this point, the route traveled in a northerly direction before reaching its northern terminus at US 278; however, the route was signed East-West.

== History ==
State Route 200 was decommissioned in January 2019. ALDOT transferred SR 21 from its original alignment into Piedmont, Alabama onto former SR 200. SR 21 now ends at US 278.

== Major intersections ==
The entire route is in Piedmont, Calhoun County.

mi	km	Destinations	Notes
0.000	0.000	SR 21 – Downtown, Jacksonville	Southern terminus
1.011	1.627	US 278 (SR 74) – Centre, Cedartown, Gadsden	Northern terminus
1.000 mi = 1.609 km; 1.000 km = 0.621 mi
