= Liberty Hill, Cleburne County, Alabama =

Unincorporated community in Alabama, United States

Liberty Hill, Alabama
- Unincorporated community
- Location within Alabama Location within the United States
- Coordinates: 33°50′55″N 85°34′22″W
- Country: United States
- State: Alabama
- County: Cleburne
- Elevation: 945 ft (288 m)
- Time zone: UTC-6 (Central (CST))
  - Summer (DST): UTC-5 (CDT)
- Area codes: 256 & 938
- GNIS feature ID: 159938

Liberty Hill is an unincorporated community in Cleburne County, Alabama, United States. Liberty Hill is located on County Route 55, 5.7 miles (9.2 km) south-southeast of Piedmont, near the headwaters of the Choccolocco Creek.
