= Merrellton, Alabama =

- Unincorporated community
- Location within Alabama Location within the United States
- Coordinates: 33°51′48″N 85°44′31″W
- Country: United States
- State: Alabama
- County: Calhoun
- Elevation: 673 ft (205 m)
- Time zone: UTC-6 (Central (CST))
  - Summer (DST): UTC-5 (CDT)
- GNIS feature ID: 160086

Merrellton, also known as East and West Junction, Junction, and Merrelton, is an unincorporated community in Calhoun County, Alabama, United States.

Merrellton is located on Alabama State Route 21, 16.6 mi (26.7 km) north of Anniston.

== History ==
A post office was established in 1884 and was named Merrill, after the daughter of the postmistress, Adelia E. Frank. A school was established in the early 1900s. The post office closed in 1923, and the school closed in 1927.

In 1929, a tornado struck an African-American church which was used as a school, demolishing the building and killing five pupils.

Merrellton was a historic junction for two now-abandoned railway lines, the East & West Railroad and the Southern Railway. In 1996, the city of Jacksonville acquired from the Norfolk Southern Railway the track bed of the former Southern Railway which passed through Merrellton. The track bed was used to complete a portion of the Chief Ladiga Trail, Alabama's first rail trail.

== Notable people ==
- Herman Clarence Nixon, political scientist and member of the Southern Agrarians.
