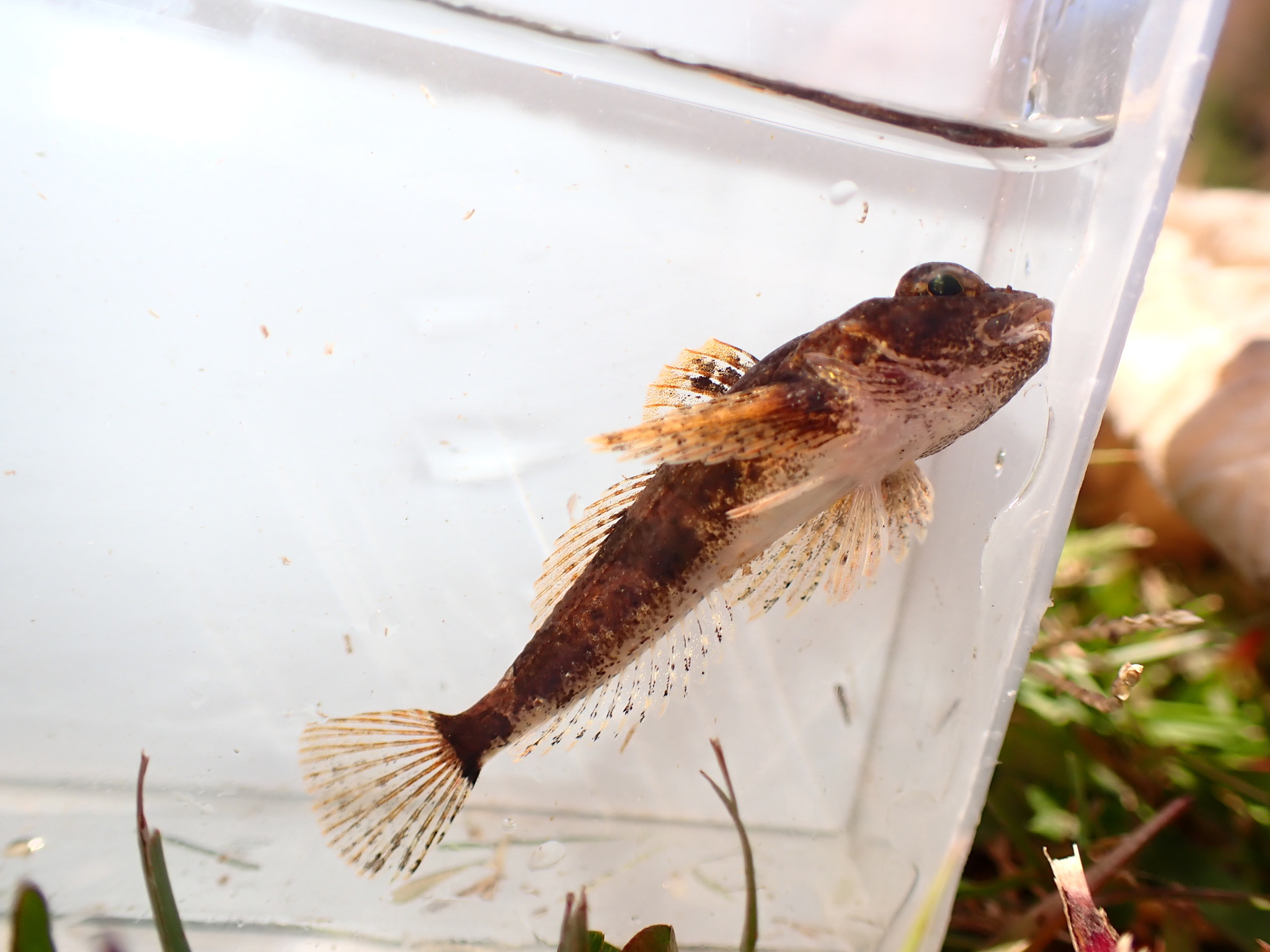

Conservation status
- Critically Endangered (IUCN 3.1)

Scientific classification
- Kingdom: Animalia
- Phylum: Chordata
- Class: Actinopterygii
- Division: Teleostei
- Order: Perciformes
- Suborder: Cottoidei
- Family: Cottidae
- Genus: Cottus
- Species: C. paulus

Binomial name
- Cottus paulus J. D. Williams, 2000

Synonyms
- Cottus pygmaeus J. D. Williams, 1968

= Pygmy sculpin =

Species of fish

The pygmy sculpin (Cottus paulus) is a species of ray-finned fish belonging to the family Cottidae, the typical sculpins. It is endemic to Alabama in the United States. It inhabits Coldwater Spring and its associated spring run in the Coosa River and Choccolocco Creek systems.

This fish produces sounds during courtship and conflict.

== Species description ==
The pygmy sculpin, also known as Cottus paulus or previously known as Cottus pygmaeus, is from the class Teleostei and order Scorpaeniformes. Like other sculpin it belongs to the family Cottidae which also contains bullheads, scaleless sculpins, chabots de mer, chapots, and charrascos espinosos. The pygmy sculpin can grow up to 1.5 inches (38 mm) and is distinguished from other sculpin by its broadly connected dorsal fins. Its body consists of a large head and incomplete lateral line. Color variation is associated with the sex, maturity and breeding conditions in the sculpin. Juveniles have a grayish black body, three colored saddles and a black head, while adults have a light colored head with small scattered melanophores. As they grow older their body color becomes lighter, while the grayish black color remains to form two dark saddles. Adults have a total of three dorsal saddles, and mottled or spotted fins. Breeding males are distinguished by enlarged, more intense dark spots in their spinous dorsal fin. Fin margins in breeding males become a reddish orange, and their underlying body pattern becomes concealed with suffused black pigment. Breeding females are only slightly darker than the retrospective non-breeding females.

== Distribution ==
The pygmy sculpin persists in an extremely restricted range. This species is only found in Coldwater Spring and the associated spring run in the locality of Calhoun County, Alabama in the United States. An impounded spring in the Coosa River Drainage, Coldwater Spring is slightly over an acre at 0.4 hectares. Surrounded by concrete sides, the spring pool ranges in a depth of 5 cm (2.0 in) to 2 m (6 ft 7 in), ranging from 16 to 18 °C (61 to 64 °F). The bottom is consistent with gravel and sand substrates, scattered with large rocks and mats of vegetation. The spring run has a width of 18 m (59 ft) and length of 152 m (499 ft), with a flow rate of 121 million litres per day. Although the pygmy sculpin are found throughout the spring, they are least common over sandy substrates, with the exception of juveniles usually occurring in low current areas over gravel bottom.

== Biology ==
Pygmy sculpin diet consists primarily of small invertebrates, with isopods serving as a year-round food source. Seasonally, pygmy sculpins also consume gastropods, amphipods, snails, and occasionally eggs of their own species. Spawning occurs year round but peaks during a time period between the months of April to August. Both males and females reach sexual maturity at lengths between 25–29 mm (0.98–1.14 in). Males produce distinctive knocking sounds, either as single knocks or in knock trains, during courtship. Like other sculpins, pygmy sculpins are cavity nesters. Competition for cavities is common with other sculpin as well as crayfish. Female pygmy sculpins produce between 18–59 eggs per spawning event, with clutch size directly relating to the female's size and age. Eggs are laid in clumps of 1-9 on the underside of rocks and bricks within these cavities and range from pale yellow to orange. Over 200 eggs can be laid in a single nest, typically being deposited by more than one female. While females do not engage in maternal care, males guard nest sites until hatching occurs. Nesting is preferred in areas of course substrate, shallow water and swift water velocity. While a slightly higher concentration of sites is found in the spring run, nests are found throughout both the spring run and pool. Newly hatched fry, measuring approximately 5.3 mm (1/4 in), are well-developed and pigmented. The only known predators of the pygmy sculpin are the grass pickerel and large water snakes.

== Conservation status ==
Pygmy sculpin are classified as Critically Endangered under the Endangered Species Act. The last assessment, on November 10, 2011, designated this status based on the species' limited range (under 100 square km), occurrence in a single location, and deteriorating water quality. Groundwater degradation remains the most serious threat to this population. The water quality of the stream itself is within excellent standing, however the water quality in the spring recharge area is experiencing deterioration. Human-related risks such as chemical spills and groundwater contamination from runoff exacerbate the risk factors. In the late 1990s, the pygmy sculpin population was estimated at approximately 25,000 individuals, and the species has shown a stable population trend within its limited range. Not typically used in human consumption, pygmy sculpin are used commonly as baitfish. While the Coldwater Spring site is under protection, further research into the species' life history and expanded groundwater monitoring are needed to better safeguard this species and its habitat.
