= Trickem, Alabama =

Trickem is the name of two communities in Alabama:

- Trickem, Cleburne County, Alabama
- Trickem, Lowndes County, Alabama
