= Chief Ladiga Trail =

Long-distance hiking trail in the United States

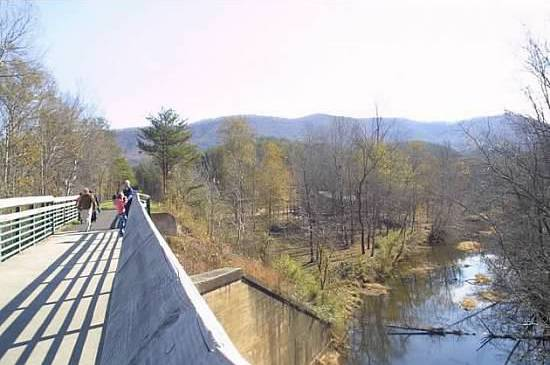
- Trail section in Cleburne County
- Length: 39.5 mi (63.6 km)
- Location: Calhoun / Cleburne counties, Alabama, USA
- Designation: Piedmont and Jacksonville sections are National Recreation Trail designated
- Trailheads: Alabama-Georgia state line (33°57′1″N 85°23′46″W); Anniston, Alabama (33°44′16″N 85°49′5″W)
- Use: Hiking, biking
- Highest point: About 950 ft (290 m) near the Alabama-Georgia state line
- Lowest point: About 650 ft (198 m) in Jacksonville

The Chief Ladiga Trail /ləˈdaɪɡə/ is a rail trail in Alabama that stretches for almost 40 miles from the 4th Street Amtrak Station in Anniston, Alabama to the Alabama-Georgia state line. It is the state's first and longest rail trail project.

== History ==
=== Trail background ===
The Chief Ladiga is on the same rail corridor as the Silver Comet Trail in Georgia as far as Piedmont, Alabama. From there it parallels an abandoned Southern Railway line for a few miles west of town until it leaves the old Seaboard rail line, heading south on the Norfolk Southern Railway route until the trail ends at the 4th Street Amtrak Station in downtown Anniston. In 2008, the Ladiga and Silver Comet trail were connected. A new gateway marks the connecting point at the state line. Now that the Chief Ladiga and the Silver Comet trails are connected, there is a 90-mile (145 km) paved corridor for non-motorized travel from just west of Atlanta, Georgia to Anniston, Alabama making it the 2nd longest paved trail in the U.S (the longest being the Paul Bunyan State Trail in Minnesota).

=== Chief Ladiga ===
Chief Ladiga was a Muscogee chief who relinquished his tribe's lands when he signed the Treaty of Cusseta in 1832. The Treaty was part of a broader policy of indian removal perpetrated by the Jackson Administration. Ladiga sold half his land (which would later become Jacksonville) to speculators for $2000.

== Route ==
The Chief Ladiga Trail starts in Cleburne County at the Alabama-Georgia state line (where it meets the Silver Comet Trail). In northern Cleburne County at about mile marker 7.0, the trail enters the Talladega National Forest and crosses the Pinhoti National Recreation Trail. It travels west into Calhoun County and then into Piedmont, the direction changes to southwest then on to Jacksonville and going through the Jacksonville State University campus. Then, the trail passes through Weaver and passes Michael Tucker Park in north Anniston and heads south through the City of Anniston, finally ending at the 4th St. Amtrak Station in downtown Anniston. Along the way the trail travels through wetlands, across streams, through forests and farmlands, and includes a horizon view of the Talladega Mountains. There are several bridges and both new and restored railroad trestles.

There was a proposal to extend the trail 7.2 miles (11.6 km) from Michael Tucker Park southward to 4th street in downtown Anniston. As of May 2022, the City of Anniston hired an engineering firm to inspect bridges and design the 6.5-mile (10.5 km) trail extension. On April 26, 2025 the City of Anniston celebrated the opening of a 6.5 mile extension of the Chief Ladiga Trail. The new section extends from Mike Tucker Park to the 4th Street Amtrak Station in downtown Anniston.

== See also ==
- Silver Comet Trail
- List of Hiking Trails in Alabama
