= Holiday darter =

Conservation status
- Vulnerable (IUCN 3.1)

Scientific classification
- Kingdom: Animalia
- Phylum: Chordata
- Class: Actinopterygii
- Division: Teleostei
- Order: Perciformes
- Family: Percidae
- Genus: Etheostoma
- Species: E. brevirostrum

Binomial name
- Etheostoma brevirostrum Suttkus & Etnier, 1991

Species of fish

The holiday darter (Etheostoma brevirostrum) is a species of freshwater ray-finned fish, a darter from the subfamily Etheostomatinae, part of the family Percidae, which also contains the perches, ruffes and pikeperches. It is found in the southeast US water system, with disjunctive populations throughout Alabama, Georgia, and Tennessee. It is also located in the Coosa River / Choccolocco Creek watershed which begins in Tennessee and far west Georgia, then enters Alabama. Its diet, close to other members of the subgenus Ulocentra, consists of small insects, including midges, black fly larvae, and small crustaceans. The two subspecies inhabit small to medium-sized gradient-rich streams. They are often found in fast-moving streams with large boulders, gravel, cobbles, and sand. They can be found in the margins between these large boulders, and use the boulders for protection from predators and for the females to attach eggs. The holiday darter has very vibrant coloration, but will display even more brilliant coloration during or before spawning. Spawning takes place during the spring, usually around April or May. This species is state listed in Georgia as threatened. One of the disjunct populations is located in the Talladega National Forest, which results in it being protected from human encroachment. The separate populations can make it difficult to determine the exact population count.

== Distribution ==
The distribution of E. brevirostrum, according to the US Fish and Wildlife Service, is known or believed to be in Alabama, Georgia, and Tennessee, including the Conasauga River and the upper Coosa River system. It is only known to populate four different river systems, at about 18 different locations. It is believed to be extirpated in portions of its current range, and to have a stable population in the Upper Shoal Creek, and the Consauga River from Murray County, Georgia, to Polk County, Tennessee. It is "possibly extirpated from the Calhoun County, Alabama, section of Shoal Creek due to impoundments." This darter is highly affected by barriers that prevent movement throughout a water system. Population counts are spotty and have a wide range of results. Snorkeling has been a common method to take population counts. In the past, population counts at a single site have "resulted in 1, 15-36, 3-13 and 4-10 individuals." These inconsistent counts make it difficult to determine an exact population counts.

== Ecology ==
The holiday darter is known for eating "…aquatic insect larvae and micro crustaceans." It prefers a habitat in relatively shallow water, which is normally between 22 and 34 cm. It can be found in areas with cobbles, large boulders, and gravel substrate, and is often found in clear streams. It prefers fast-moving water. The boulders that are present in these habitats are often covered with moss. Sand and river weed are also common. It can be found in rocky runs and pools that contain riffles of cool to warm creeks that are small to medium in size. Its predators are mostly larger predatory stream fish, but no predators are known for specifically targeting this species. Threats to its population include dam construction that prevents movement and affects water quality in a stream. Also, threats include sedimentation that occurs from logging and road building. Removal or damage to the riparian zones are known to be detrimental to population counts. "...small changes in stream conditions, such as hydrology, storm flow, impervious surface cover, and bank height, have been demonstrated to affect minnow and darter populations".

== Life history ==
Breeding for E. brevirostrum is much like other members of Ulocentra. They will breed in the same area in which they live; they are not known for migration or habitat movement to spawn. Spawning occurs in early spring around April and May. Often, the male positions himself over or to the side of the female as they move over the substrate. Once the female finds a suitable area for egg placement, the male will fertilize the eggs. The female will usually pick an area between cobbles or in a crevice to attach the eggs. The holiday darter has demonstrated territorial behavior when approached by other males during the spawning process. No parental care is observed after the eggs have been attached to the cobbles. The average lifespan is typically about four years and they will reach sexual maturity within the first year of life. Sedimentation on rocks can make it difficult for the eggs to attach, so can hurt reproduction rates. Directly before or during spawning, males will display more vibrant colors than at other times of the year. According to Gumm and Mendelson, there are "...four discrete color classes in darters; red, orange, yellow, blue/green." During spawning, these colors are more vibrant and bright.

== Management ==
Currently, no management plans are in effect for E. brevirostrum, but it is a state listed species in Alabama and is protected under the Non-Game Species regulation. Most of its populations occur in the Talladega National Forest, which provides protection and helps to keep the population numbers at a safe level. National forests have riparian streamside management zones which help in the preservation of their preferred habitat. Sediment filters are also used to prevent sedimentation from occurring and affecting their reproduction. Small impoundment is currently the largest threat, and "...impoundments along the creek isolate holiday darter populations." Human-induced threats to the holiday darter result in habitat fragmentation and poor water quality, which can be a result of direct pollution into a stream or poor agricultural practices by upstream land owners.
