= Edwardsville, Alabama =

- Town
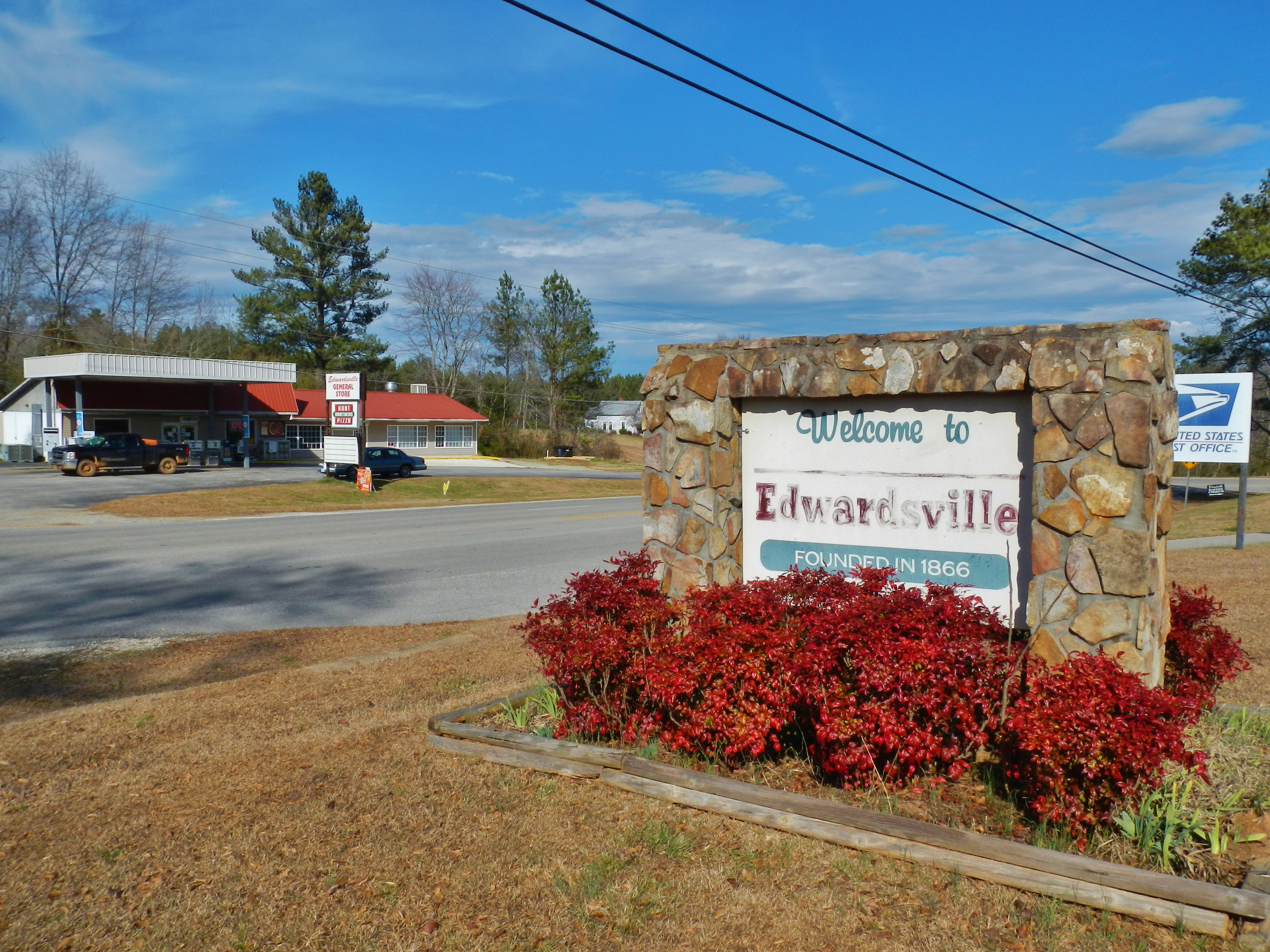
- Welcome to Edwardsville sign

- Location of Edwardsville in Cleburne County, Alabama.
- Coordinates: 33°46′50″N 85°27′02″W
- Country: United States
- State: Alabama
- County: Cleburne

Area
  - Total: 16.45 sq mi (42.60 km^{2})
  - Land: 16.45 sq mi (42.60 km^{2})
  - Water: 0 sq mi (0.00 km^{2})
- Elevation: 1,024 ft (312 m)

Population (2020)
  - Total: 206
  - Density: 12.5/sq mi (4.84/km^{2})
- Time zone: UTC-6 (Central (CST))
  - Summer (DST): UTC-5 (CDT)
- ZIP code: 36261
- Area code: 256
- FIPS code: 01-23176
- GNIS feature ID: 2406427

Edwardsville is a town in Cleburne County, Alabama, United States. At the 2020 census, the population was 206. From 1867 to 1906, it served as the Cleburne County Seat. In 1880 and 1890, it was the most populous community in the county. It reached its population zenith of 448 in 1900 when it fell behind Heflin, to which it also lost the county seat to six years later. It has not had more than 226 persons since 1920.

== Geography ==
According to the U.S. Census Bureau, the town has a total area of 16.4 square miles (42 km^{2}), all land.

=== Climate ===
The climate in this area is characterized by hot, humid summers and generally mild to cool winters. According to the Köppen Climate Classification system, Edwardsville has a humid subtropical climate, abbreviated "Cfa" on climate maps.

== Demographics ==
Historical population
Census	Pop.	Note	%±
1880	207		—
1890	446		115.5%
1900	448		0.4%
1910	303		−32.4%
1920	334		10.2%
1930	226		−32.3%
1940	194		−14.2%
1950	179		−7.7%
1960	168		−6.1%
1970	146		−13.1%
1980	207		41.8%
1990	118		−43.0%
2000	186		57.6%
2010	202		8.6%
2020	206		2.0%
U.S. Decennial Census; 2013 Estimate

As of the census of 2000, there were 186 people, 80 households, and 55 families residing in the town. The population density was 194.0 inhabitants per square mile (74.9/km^{2}). There were 89 housing units at an average density of 92.8 per square mile (35.8/km^{2}). The racial makeup of the town was 98.39% White, 0.54% Black or African American, and 1.08% from two or more races. 0.54% of the population were Hispanic or Latino of any race.

There were 80 households, out of which 25.0% had children under the age of 18 living with them, 58.8% were married couples living together, 7.5% had a female householder with no husband present, and 31.3% were non-families. 26.3% of all households were made up of individuals, and 11.3% had someone living alone who was 65 years of age or older. The average household size was 2.33 and the average family size was 2.84.

In the town, the population was spread out, with 22.6% under the age of 18, 7.0% from 18 to 24, 27.4% from 25 to 44, 25.3% from 45 to 64, and 17.7% who were 65 years of age or older. The median age was 40 years. For every 100 females, there were 111.4 males. For every 100 females age 18 and over, there were 100.0 males.

The median income for a household in the town was $19,808, and the median income for a family was $29,792. Males had a median income of $30,500 versus $21,250 for females. The per capita income for the town was $12,835. About 16.4% of families and 28.7% of the population were below the poverty line, including 26.4% of those under the age of eighteen and 20.0% of those 65 or over.

== Gallery ==
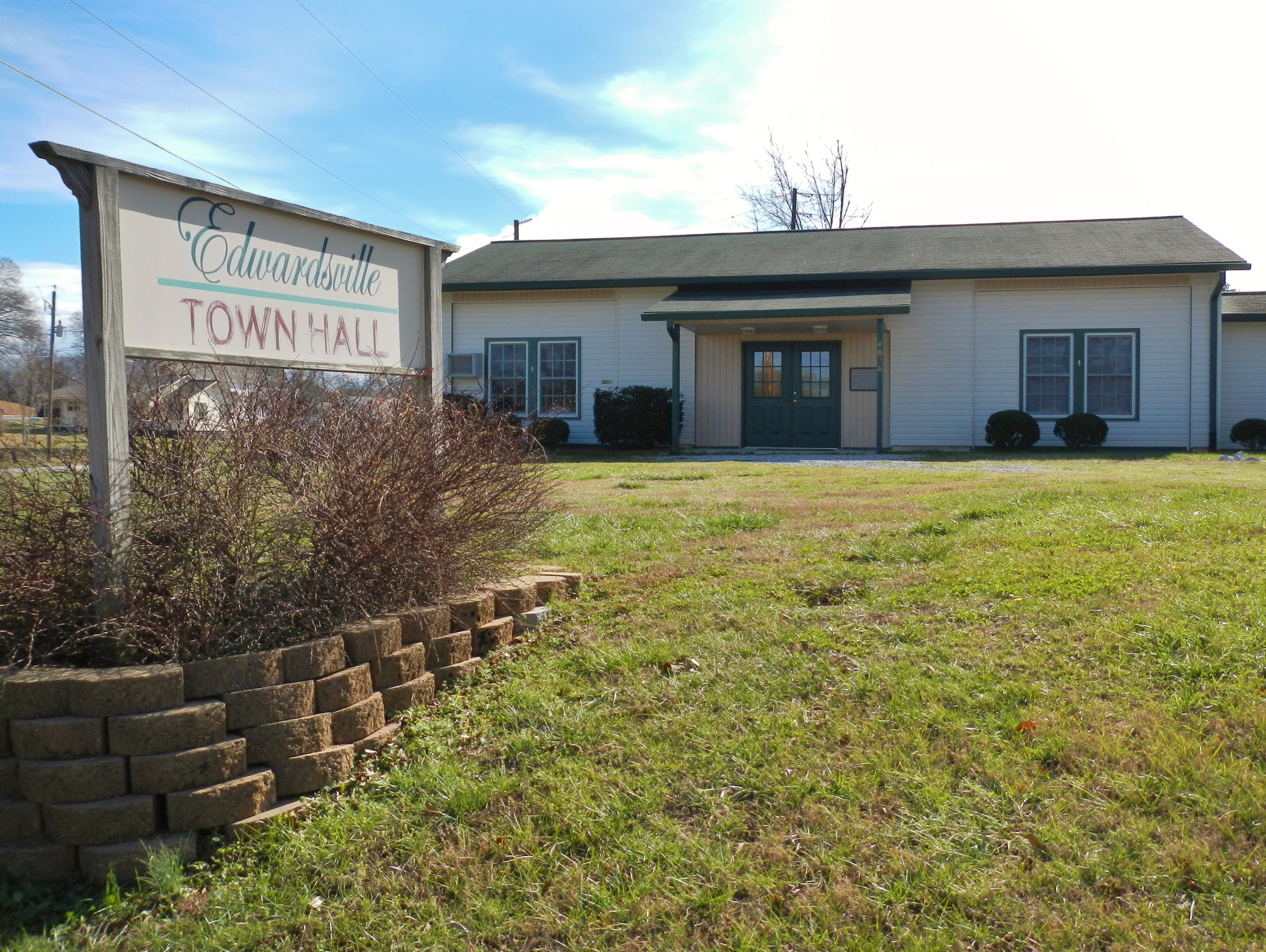
Edwardsville Town Hall

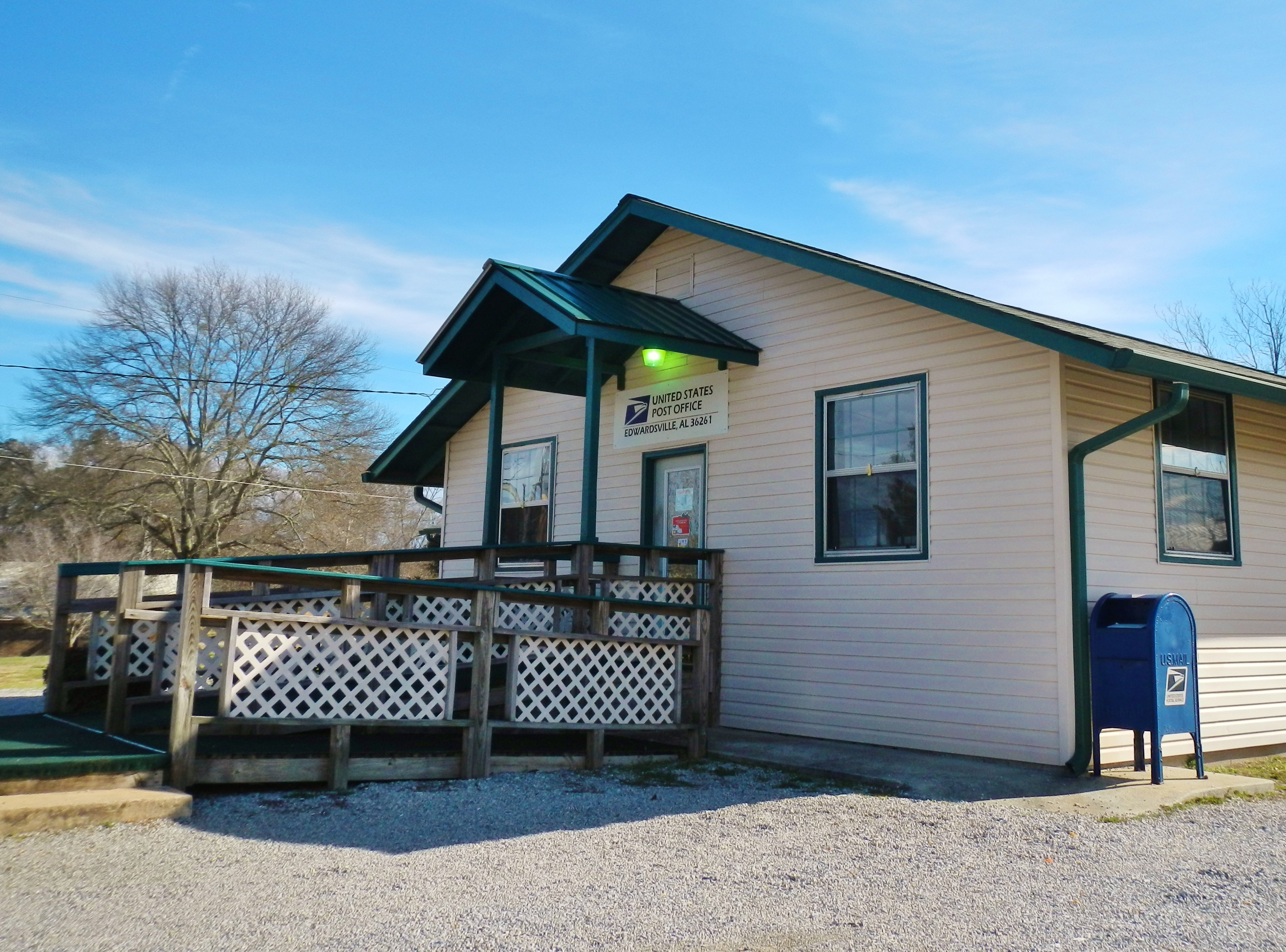
Edwardsville Post Office (ZIP Code:36261)

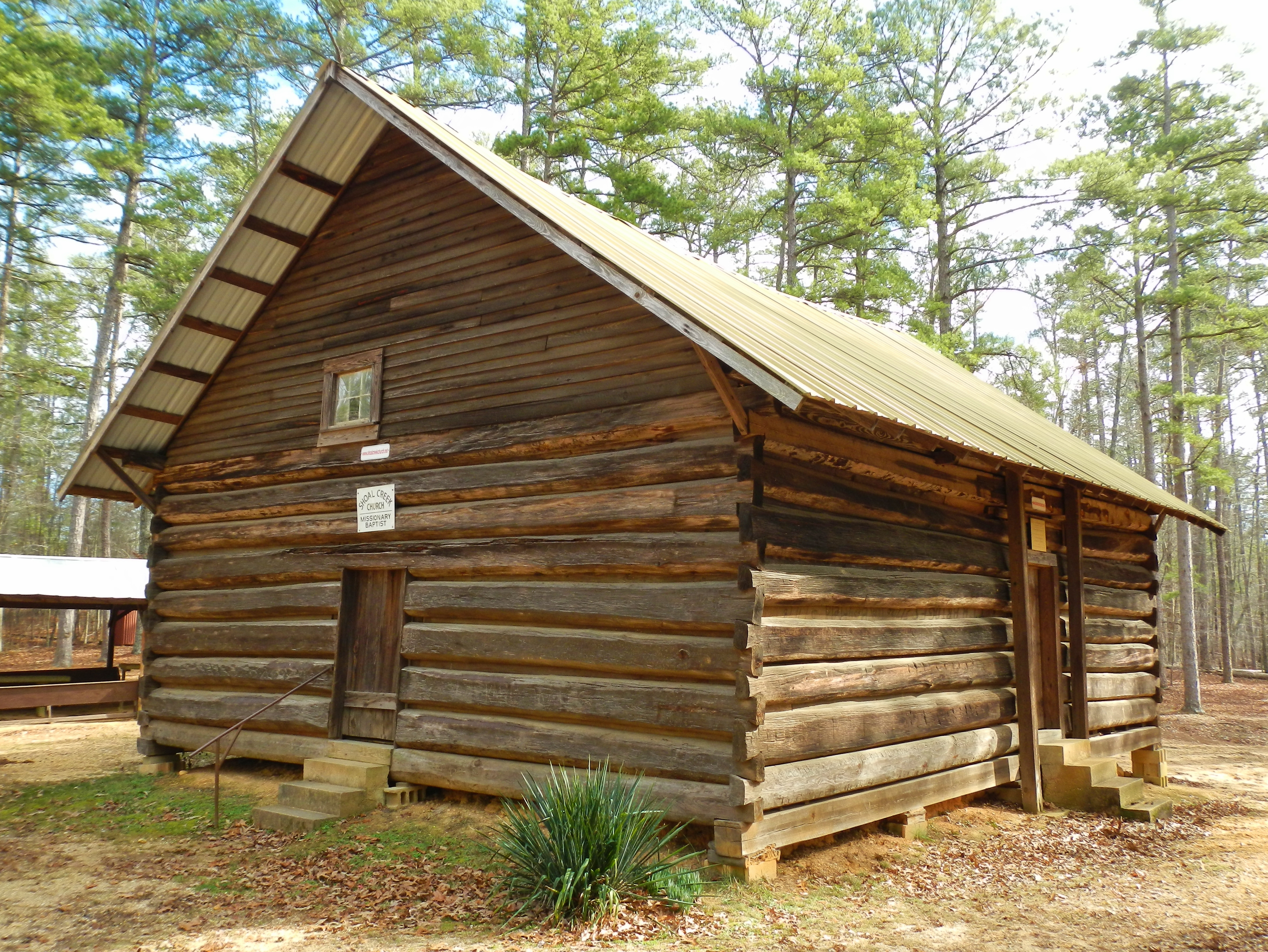
Shoal Creek Church is a historic church located in Talladega National Forest just north of Edwardsville. It was built in 1895 and added to the National Register of Historic Places on December 4, 1974.

== See also ==
- List of towns in Alabama
