= Peaceburg, Alabama =

- Unincorporated community
- Location within Alabama Location within the United States
- Coordinates: 33°44′22″N 85°54′38″W
- Country: United States
- State: Alabama
- County: Calhoun
- Elevation: 666 ft (203 m)
- Time zone: UTC-6 (Central (CST))
  - Summer (DST): UTC-5 (CDT)
- Area codes: 256 & 938
- GNIS feature ID: 156861

Peaceburg is an unincorporated community in Calhoun County, Alabama, United States.

== History ==
A post office was established in the former town of Peaceburg, Alabama, in 1885, and remained in operation until it was discontinued in 1905. Peaceburg (as well as the nearby town of Morrisville) was part of a purchase of 26,912.17 acres by the War Department in 1941. The area was evacuated by its residents and served the purpose of training for World War II. Originally it was called the Morrisville Maneuver Area but later was renamed as the Pelham Range Area.

Its coordinates are approximately 33.738268 degrees north and -85.904732 degrees west, located in west central Calhoun County, in Alabama, at an altitude of 620 feet.
