= Standard Coosa-Thatcher Company =

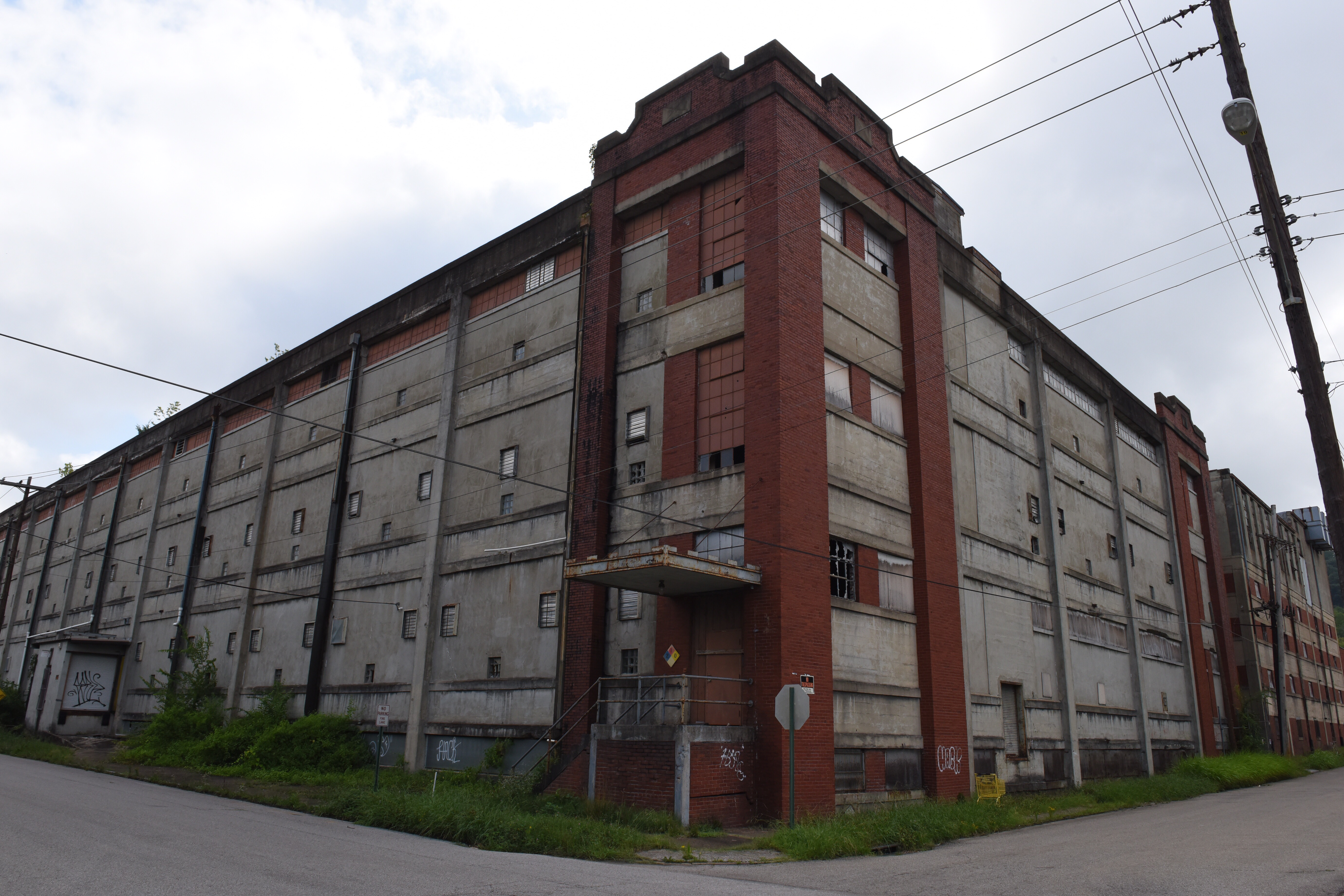
- Company type: Public company (formerly)
- Industry: Textile
- Founded: 1891
- Defunct: 2003
- Headquarters: Chattanooga, Tennessee
- Products: Mercerized yarn, cotton thread, spinning services
- Revenue: $175.5 million (1981)
- Net income: $1.5 million (1981)
- Number of employees: ~2,200 (at peak)

The Standard Coosa-Thatcher Company was a textile corporation founded in Piedmont, Alabama in 1891. It was publicly traded beginning in 1922. The firm is important because of its endurance for nearly a century and its expansion throughout the southeast United States and into the western United States.

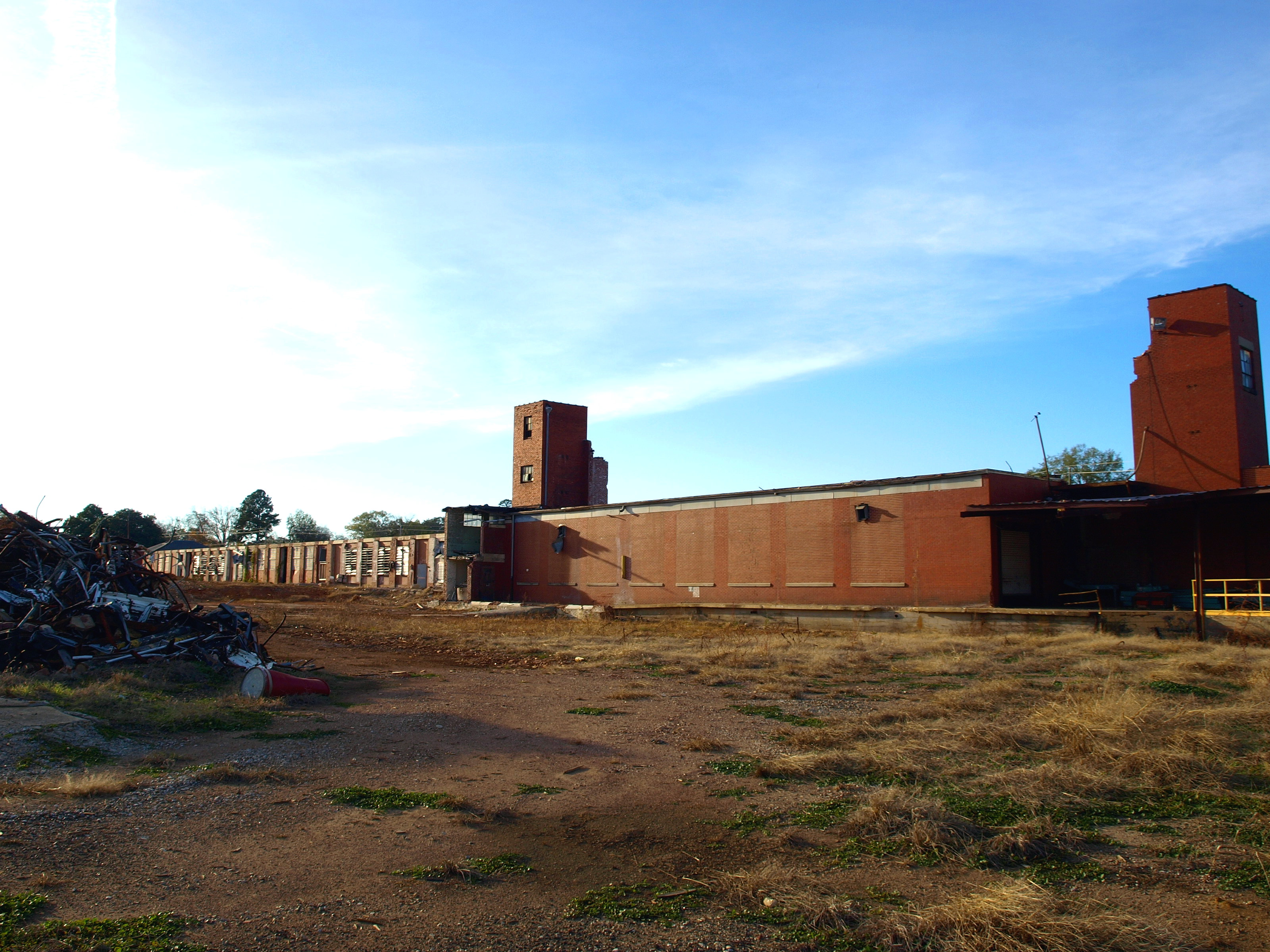
The former Standard Coosa-Thatcher mill in Peidmont

== History of textile business ==
Standard Coosa-Thatcher Company made a significant addition to its Chattanooga, Tennessee mill in 1925. It operated thirteen plants in California, North Carolina, Alabama, Tennessee, and Georgia. In 1981 the enterprise generated $175.5 million in sales and net income of $1.5 million or $2.82 per share.

Owners of the concern agreed to be acquired by a group of company executives, with additional funding from Wolsey & Company, a New York City investment firm, in April 1982. They resolved to reject a bid from Chicago, Illinois investor Clyde W. Engle, who offered $60 per share. Stockholders continued to debate whether to accept the $53 per share offered by Standard Coosa-Thatcher officials in July 1982

== See also ==
- Sauquiot Spinning Company
