= Chulafinnee, Alabama =

Unincorporated community in Alabama, United States

- Unincorporated community
- Location within Alabama Location within the United States
- Coordinates: 33°32′43″N 85°38′56″W
- Country: United States
- State: Alabama
- County: Cleburne
- Elevation: 876 ft (267 m)
- Time zone: UTC-6 (Central (CST))
  - Summer (DST): UTC-5 (CDT)
- GNIS feature ID: 159405

Chulafinnee is an unincorporated community in Cleburne County, Alabama, United States.

== History ==
Chulafinnee was named after the nearby Chulafinnee Creek, which was derived from Creek words chuli meaning "pine" and fina meaning "footlog". Chulafinnee was founded in 1835 when gold was found in the nearby creeks. The population was smaller than that of nearby Arbacoochee (which was also formed after gold was found nearby), but considered by locals to be a more permanent town due to the greater number of brick buildings. Local lore held that the King brothers, (who later founded King Ranch), were prospectors in the area. Remains of some of the mines are located on the Frank Spain Scout Reservation, where participating Scouts are able to learn about the history of the area.

The American geologist Eugene Allen Smith explored the old mines and examined minerals around Chulafinnee in the late 1800s.

A post office operated under the name Chulafinnee from 1842 to 1904.
