= Cleburne County, Alabama =

County in Alabama, United States

- County
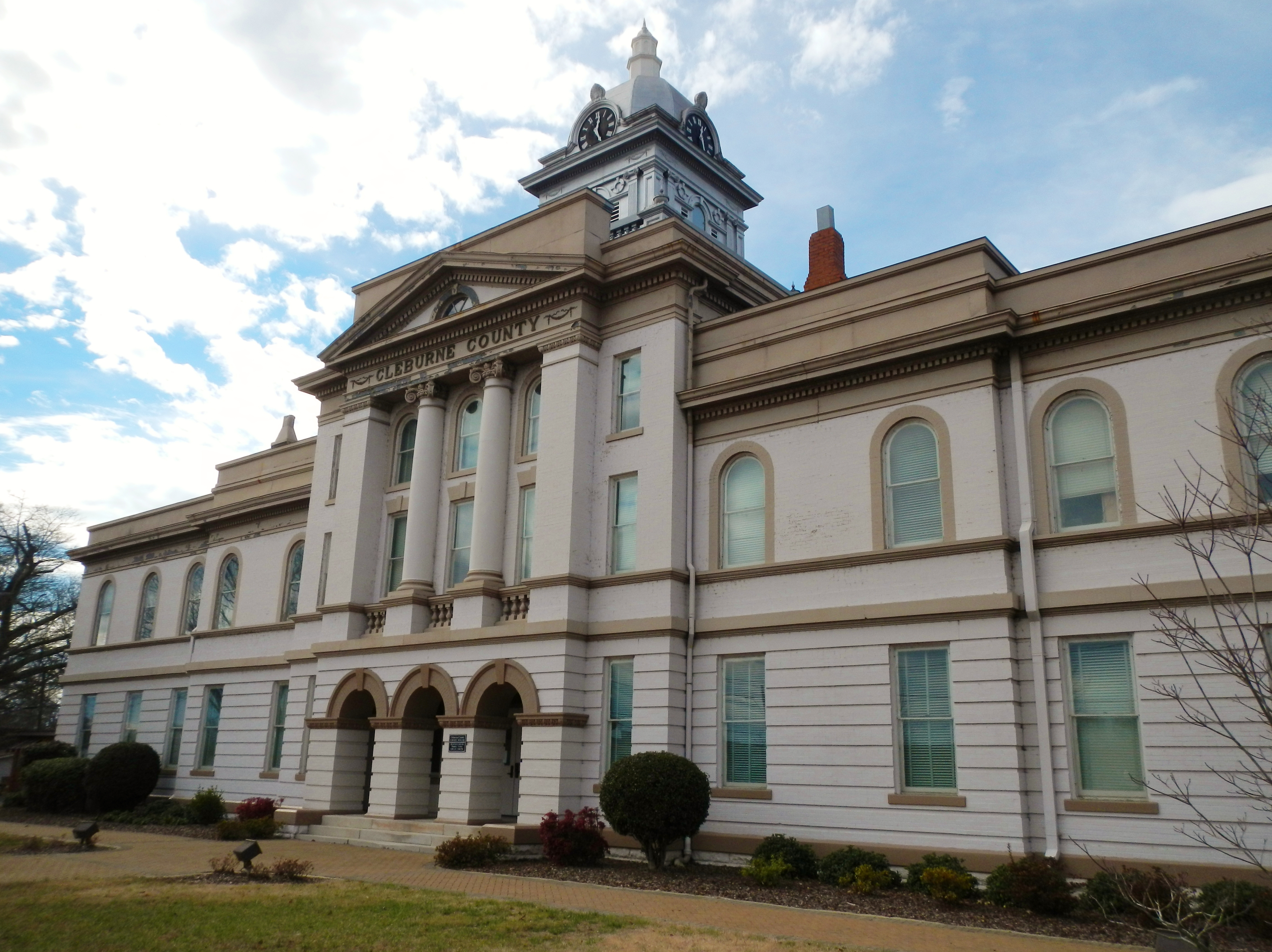
- Cleburne County Courthouse in Heflin, 2012

- Flag Seal

- Location within the U.S. state of Alabama
- Coordinates: 33°40′38″N 85°30′09″W
- Country: United States
- State: Alabama
- Founded: December 6, 1866
- Named for: Patrick Cleburne
- Seat: Heflin
- Largest city: Heflin

Area
  - Total: 561 sq mi (1,450 km^{2})
  - Land: 560 sq mi (1,500 km^{2})
  - Water: 0.9 sq mi (2.3 km^{2}) 0.2%

Population (2020)
  - Total: 15,056
  - Estimate (2025): 15,970 ▲
  - Density: 27/sq mi (10/km^{2})
- Time zone: UTC−6 (Central)
  - Summer (DST): UTC−5 (CDT)
- Congressional district: 3rd
- Website: cleburnecountyal.com
- County Number 18 on Alabama Licence Plates

Cleburne County is a county located in the east central portion of the U.S. state of Alabama. As of the 2020 census, the population was 15,056. Its county seat is Heflin. Its name is in honor of Patrick R. Cleburne of Arkansas who rose to the rank of major general in the Confederate States Army. The eastern side of the county borders the state of Georgia.

== History ==
Cleburne County was established on December 6, 1866, by an act of the state legislature. The county was made from territory in Benton (now Calhoun), Randolph, and Talladega counties. In 1867, Edwardsville was made the county seat. An election was held in 1905 to move the county seat to Heflin. The result of that election, which agreed to move the seat, was appealed to the Supreme Court, who decided on July 1, 1906, to uphold the election results. Heflin is still the county seat. Heflin was at one point thought of as a hub for nearby farmers to send their cotton. Shortly after the Civil War, a group of northern investors created the town of Fruithurst in Cleburne County as part of a wine-growing project. Fruithurst became a boomtown shortly thereafter.

== Geography ==
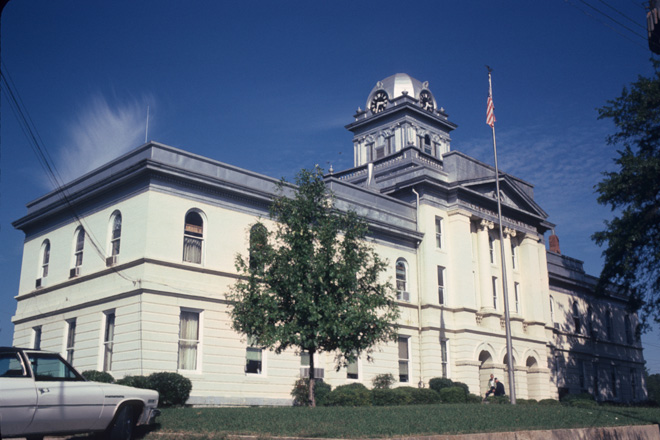
Cleburne County Courthouse in March 1980.

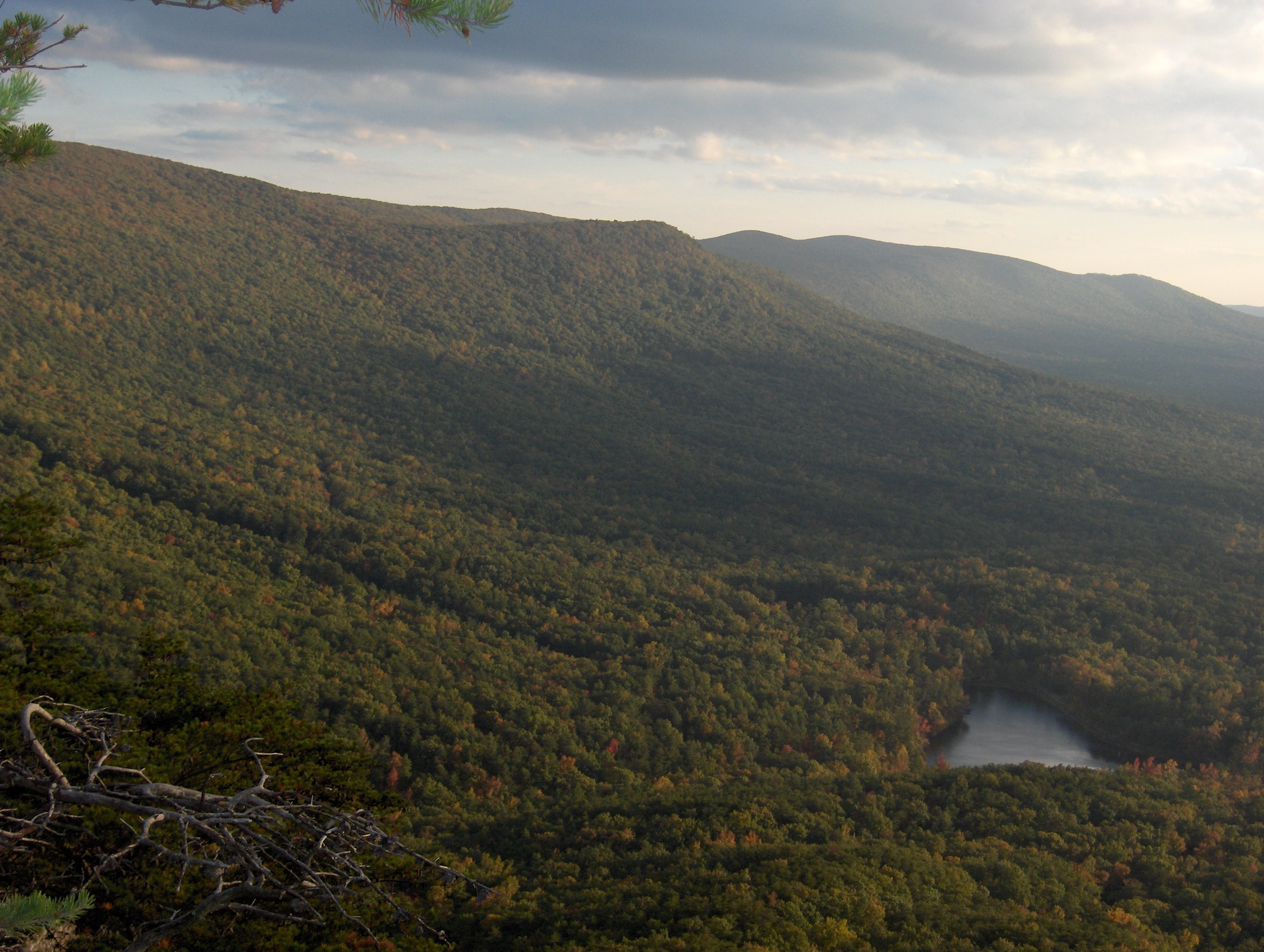
Cheaha Mountain, Cleburne County

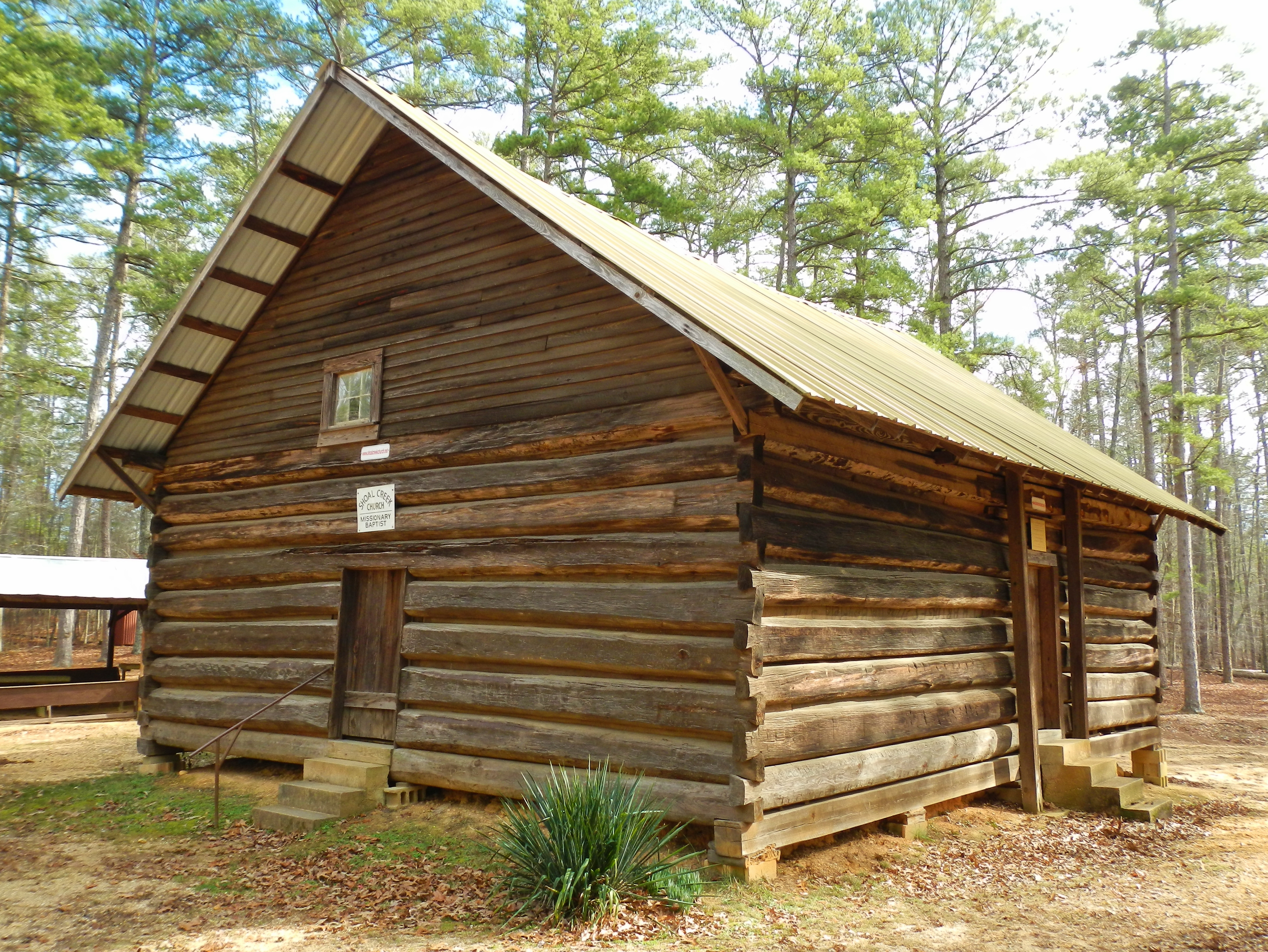
Shoal Creek Church is a historic church located in Cleburne County just north of Edwardsville, Alabama in Talladega National Forest. The church was built in 1895 and added to the National Register of Historic Places on December 4, 1974

According to the United States Census Bureau, the county has a total area of 561 square miles (1,450 km^{2}), of which 560 square miles (1,500 km^{2}) is land and 0.9 square miles (2.3 km^{2}) (0.2%) is water. It is the fourth-smallest county in Alabama by land area. Cleburne County is home to Alabama's highest natural point on Cheaha Mountain which is part of the southernmost mountain range in the Appalachian Mountains.

=== Adjacent counties ===
- Cherokee County – north
- Polk County, Georgia – northeast
- Haralson County, Georgia – east
- Carroll County, Georgia – southeast
- Randolph County – south
- Clay County – southwest
- Talladega County – southwest
- Calhoun County – west

=== National protected area ===
- Talladega National Forest (part)

== Transportation ==
=== Major highways ===
- Interstate 20
- U.S. Highway 78 / State Route 4 (unsigned)
- U.S. Highway 431 / State Route 1 (unsigned)
- State Route 9
- State Route 46
- State Route 281

=== Rail ===
- Norfolk Southern Railway
- Amtrak

== Demographics ==
Historical population
Census	Pop.	Note	%±
1870	8,017		—
1880	10,976		36.9%
1890	13,218		20.4%
1900	13,206		−0.1%
1910	13,385		1.4%
1920	13,360		−0.2%
1930	12,877		−3.6%
1940	13,629		5.8%
1950	11,904		−12.7%
1960	10,911		−8.3%
1970	10,996		0.8%
1980	12,595		14.5%
1990	12,730		1.1%
2000	14,123		10.9%
2010	14,972		6.0%
2020	15,056		0.6%
2025 (est.)	15,970	▲	6.1%
U.S. Decennial Census; 1790–1960 1900–1990; 1990–2000 2010–2020

=== 2020 census ===
As of the 2020 census, the county had a population of 15,056. The median age was 43.3 years. 22.8% of residents were under the age of 18 and 19.6% of residents were 65 years of age or older. For every 100 females there were 98.1 males, and for every 100 females age 18 and over there were 96.6 males age 18 and over.

The racial makeup of the county was 91.8% White, 3.1% Black or African American, 0.4% American Indian and Alaska Native, 0.1% Asian, 0.0% Native Hawaiian and Pacific Islander, 0.9% from some other race, and 3.8% from two or more races. Hispanic or Latino residents of any race comprised 1.9% of the population.

0.0% of residents lived in urban areas, while 100.0% lived in rural areas.

There were 6,054 households in the county, of which 30.2% had children under the age of 18 living with them and 25.2% had a female householder with no spouse or partner present. About 28.8% of all households were made up of individuals and 13.4% had someone living alone who was 65 years of age or older.

There were 6,801 housing units, of which 11.0% were vacant. Among occupied housing units, 75.6% were owner-occupied and 24.4% were renter-occupied. The homeowner vacancy rate was 1.2% and the rental vacancy rate was 5.9%.

=== Racial and ethnic composition ===
Cleburne County, Alabama – Racial and ethnic composition Note: the US Census treats Hispanic/Latino as an ethnic category. This table excludes Latinos from the racial categories and assigns them to a separate category. Hispanics/Latinos may be of any race.
Race / Ethnicity (NH = Non-Hispanic)	Pop 2000	Pop 2010	Pop 2020	% 2000	% 2010	% 2020
White alone (NH)	13,235	13,956	13,740	93.71%	93.21%	91.26%
Black or African American alone (NH)	521	494	457	3.69%	3.30%	3.04%
Native American or Alaska Native alone (NH)	41	50	42	0.29%	0.33%	0.28%
Asian alone (NH)	19	23	21	0.13%	0.15%	0.14%
Pacific Islander alone (NH)	1	1	2	0.01%	0.01%	0.01%
Other Race alone (NH)	1	4	16	0.01%	0.03%	0.11%
Mixed race or Multiracial (NH)	107	137	494	0.76%	0.92%	3.28%
Hispanic or Latino (any race)	198	307	284	1.40%	2.05%	1.89%
Total	14,123	14,972	15,056	100.00%	100.00%	100.00%

=== 2010 census ===
As of the census of 2010, there were 14,972 people, 5,891 households, and 4,196 families living in the county. The population density was 27 people per square mile (10 people/km^{2}). There were 6,718 housing units at an average density of 11 units per square mile (4.2 units/km^{2}). The racial makeup of the county was 94.0% White (non-Hispanic), 3.3% Black or African American, 0.30% Native American, 0.1% Asian, 0.1% Pacific Islander, 1.0% from other races, and 1.1% from two or more races. 2.1% of the population were Hispanic or Latino of any race.

There were 5,891 households, out of which 28.7% had children under the age of 18 living with them, 56.2% were married couples living together, 10.3% had a female householder with no husband present, and 28.8% were non-families. 25.1% of all households were made up of individuals, and 11.2% had someone living alone who was 65 years of age or older. The average household size was 2.51 and the average family size was 2.99.

In the county, the population was spread out, with 23.7% under the age of 18, 7.8% from 18 to 24, 24.6% from 25 to 44, 28.1% from 45 to 64, and 15.8% who were 65 years of age or older. The median age was 40.6 years. For every 100 females there were 99.1 males. For every 100 females age 18 and over, there were 100.9 males.

The median income for a household in the county was $36,077, and the median income for a family was $41,585. Males had a median income of $39,709 versus $26,229 for females. The per capita income for the county was $17,490. About 11.6% of families and 17.1% of the population were below the poverty line, including 24.0% of those under age 18 and 13.7% of those age 65 or over.

=== 2000 census ===
As of the census of 2000, there were 14,123 people, 5,590 households, and 4,125 families living in the county. The population density was 25 people per square mile (9.7 people/km^{2}). There were 6,189 housing units at an average density of 11 units per square mile (4.2 units/km^{2}). The racial makeup of the county was 89.74% White (non-Hispanic), 7.70% Black or African American, 0.30% Native American, 0.14% Asian, 0.01% Pacific Islander, 0.34% from other races, and 0.77% from two or more races. 3.40% of the population were Hispanic or Latino of any race.

There were 5,590 households, out of which 32.80% had children under the age of 18 living with them, 61.40% were married couples living together, 8.70% had a female householder with no husband present, and 26.20% were non-families. 23.00% of all households were made up of individuals, and 10.30% had someone living alone who was 65 years of age or older. The average household size was 2.51 and the average family size was 2.95.

In the county, the population was spread out, with 24.30% under the age of 18, 8.20% from 18 to 24, 28.50% from 25 to 44, 25.30% from 45 to 64, and 13.70% who were 65 years of age or older. The median age was 38 years. For every 100 females there were 99.30 males. For every 100 females age 18 and over, there were 96.40 males.

The median income for a household in the county was $30,820, and the median income for a family was $35,579. Males had a median income of $29,752 versus $18,840 for females. The per capita income for the county was $14,762. About 10.90% of families and 13.90% of the population were below the poverty line, including 16.10% of those under age 18 and 20.10% of those age 65 or over.

== Education ==
Cleburne County contains two public school districts. There are approximately 2,500 students in public PK-12 schools in Cleburne County. Much of the county is serviced by the single county school district, but the northern portion of the county falls under Piedmont City School District, the seat of which is in Calhoun County.

=== Districts ===
School districts include:

- Cleburne County School District
- Piedmont City School District

== Politics ==
Although not to the same extent as Winston or Chilton Counties, Cleburne County was at least in Presidential elections a Republican island in overwhelmingly Democratic Alabama during the "Solid South" era due to its unsuitable terrain for slave-based plantation agriculture. This led to considerable Populist support during the period of "Redemption" by white Democrats, which produced later support for the Republican Party even when in most of Alabama whites associated the "Party of Lincoln" with occupation and black political power.

Since the end of the dealigned political era of the 1960s and 1970s, Cleburne County has followed the same trajectory towards overwhelming Republican dominance as the rest of Appalachia: in 2020, Joe Biden gained nine percent of the county's vote, a figure less than George McGovern in his landslide 1972 defeat.

United States presidential election results for Cleburne County, Alabama
Year	Republican		Democratic		Third party(ies)	
Year	No.	%	No.	%	No.	%
1868	402	50.76%	390	49.24%	0	0.00%
1872	416	44.83%	512	55.17%	0	0.00%
1876	219	17.23%	1,052	82.77%	0	0.00%
1880	117	11.46%	904	88.54%	0	0.00%
1884	285	23.36%	935	76.64%	0	0.00%
1888	276	22.68%	940	77.24%	1	0.08%
1892	47	2.68%	1,045	59.58%	662	37.74%
1896	472	31.07%	993	65.37%	54	3.55%
1900	624	45.09%	660	47.69%	100	7.23%
1904	414	35.94%	701	60.85%	37	3.21%
1908	357	49.86%	278	38.83%	81	11.31%
1912	133	9.96%	691	51.72%	512	38.32%
1916	578	42.75%	760	56.21%	14	1.04%
1920	971	58.60%	684	41.28%	2	0.12%
1924	696	51.18%	622	45.74%	42	3.09%
1928	1,108	58.25%	794	41.75%	0	0.00%
1932	405	22.35%	1,403	77.43%	4	0.22%
1936	543	30.75%	1,212	68.63%	11	0.62%
1940	434	24.00%	1,369	75.72%	5	0.28%
1944	504	34.57%	948	65.02%	6	0.41%
1948	317	30.87%	0	0.00%	710	69.13%
1952	792	33.64%	1,557	66.14%	5	0.21%
1956	1,056	42.75%	1,407	56.96%	7	0.28%
1960	1,008	39.97%	1,510	59.87%	4	0.16%
1964	2,156	76.24%	0	0.00%	672	23.76%
1968	485	12.14%	160	4.01%	3,350	83.85%
1972	3,420	85.20%	581	14.47%	13	0.32%
1976	1,436	36.07%	2,490	62.55%	55	1.38%
1980	2,389	52.78%	2,050	45.29%	87	1.92%
1984	3,259	70.50%	1,238	26.78%	126	2.73%
1988	3,071	68.40%	1,383	30.80%	36	0.80%
1992	2,425	46.31%	2,144	40.94%	668	12.76%
1996	2,063	48.64%	1,737	40.96%	441	10.40%
2000	3,333	65.46%	1,664	32.68%	95	1.87%
2004	4,370	75.37%	1,391	23.99%	37	0.64%
2008	5,216	80.35%	1,168	17.99%	108	1.66%
2012	5,272	83.43%	971	15.37%	76	1.20%
2016	5,764	87.43%	684	10.37%	145	2.20%
2020	6,484	89.72%	675	9.34%	68	0.94%
2024	6,988	91.33%	605	7.91%	58	0.76%

United States Senate election results for Cleburne County, Alabama2
Year	Republican		Democratic		Third party(ies)	
Year	No.	%	No.	%	No.	%
2020	6,321	88.17%	843	11.76%	5	0.07%

United States Senate election results for Cleburne County, Alabama3
Year	Republican		Democratic		Third party(ies)	
Year	No.	%	No.	%	No.	%
2022	4,212	91.49%	308	6.69%	84	1.82%

Alabama Gubernatorial election results for Cleburne County
Year	Republican		Democratic		Third party(ies)	
Year	No.	%	No.	%	No.	%
2022	4,200	90.97%	276	5.98%	141	3.05%

== Communities ==
=== City ===
- Heflin (county seat)

=== Towns ===
- Edwardsville
- Fruithurst
- Ranburne

=== Census-designated place ===
- Hollis Crossroads

=== Unincorporated communities ===
- Abel
- Abernathy
- Ai
- Arbacoochee
- Chulafinnee
- Hopewell
- Liberty Hill
- Muscadine
- Trickem

== See also ==
- National Register of Historic Places listings in Cleburne County, Alabama
- Properties on the Alabama Register of Landmarks and Heritage in Cleburne County, Alabama
- Shoal Creek Church
- Cleburne County School District
