= Choccolocco, Alabama =

- Census-designated place & Unincorporated community
- Location of Choccolocco in Calhoun County, Alabama.
- Coordinates: 33°40′06″N 85°42′46″W
- Country: United States
- State: Alabama
- County: Calhoun

Area
  - Total: 11.78 sq mi (30.52 km^{2})
  - Land: 11.64 sq mi (30.16 km^{2})
  - Water: 0.14 sq mi (0.35 km^{2})
- Elevation: 712 ft (217 m)

Population (2020)
  - Total: 2,838
  - Density: 243.7/sq mi (94.09/km^{2})
- Time zone: UTC-6 (Central (CST))
  - Summer (DST): UTC-5 (CDT)
- ZIP code: 36207
- Area codes: 256 & 938
- GNIS feature ID: 2582668

Choccolocco is an unincorporated community and census-designated place in Calhoun County, Alabama, United States. As of the 2020 census, Choccolocco had a population of 2,838. It was founded in 1832.

The name Choccolocco is an anglicization of the Creek words "chahko lago" ("big shoals") or "choko rakko" ("big house"); sources vary.

The community gained brief notoriety in 2001 when The Daily Show aired a piece on the "Choccolocco Monster", a part of local folklore concerning sightings of a mysterious creature in the area in the late 1960s. An October 2001 article in the Anniston Star newspaper revealed that the creature was, in fact, local resident Neal Williamson. As a teenager, Williamson would don his costume (consisting of a cow skull and a sheet) and gain the attention of passing cars by jumping out of the woods onto the roadside, often startling motorists.

== Demographics ==
Historical population
Census	Pop.	Note	%±
2000	601		—
2010	2,804		366.6%
2020	2,838		1.2%
U.S. Decennial Census

Choccolocco first appeared on the 1890 U.S. Census as a town, but did not appear again until 2010 when it was listed as a census-designated place in the 2010 U.S. census.

=== Racial and ethnic composition ===
Choccolocco CDP, Alabama – Racial and ethnic composition Note: the US Census treats Hispanic/Latino as an ethnic category. This table excludes Latinos from the racial categories and assigns them to a separate category. Hispanics/Latinos may be of any race.
Race / Ethnicity (NH = Non-Hispanic)	Pop 2010	Pop 2020	% 2010	% 2020
White alone (NH)	2,412	2,405	86.02%	84.74%
Black or African American alone (NH)	200	203	7.13%	7.15%
Native American or Alaska Native alone (NH)	9	9	0.32%	0.32%
Asian alone (NH)	21	28	0.75%	0.99%
Native Hawaiian or Pacific Islander alone (NH)	0	0	0.00%	0.00%
Other race alone (NH)	1	2	0.04%	0.07%
Mixed race or Multiracial (NH)	40	88	1.43%	3.10%
Hispanic or Latino (any race)	121	103	4.32%	3.63%
Total	2,804	2,838	100.00%	100.00%

=== 2020 census ===
As of the 2020 census, Choccolocco had a population of 2,838. The median age was 40.6 years. 25.6% of residents were under the age of 18, and 16.0% were 65 years of age or older. For every 100 females there were 97.4 males, and for every 100 females age 18 and over there were 94.5 males age 18 and over.

0.0% of residents lived in urban areas, while 100.0% lived in rural areas.

There were 1,060 households in Choccolocco, of which 37.8% had children under the age of 18 living in them. Of all households, 64.8% were married-couple households, 12.0% were households with a male householder and no spouse or partner present, and 19.6% were households with a female householder and no spouse or partner present. About 19.5% of all households were made up of individuals, and 8.9% had someone living alone who was 65 years of age or older.

There were 1,120 housing units, of which 5.4% were vacant. The homeowner vacancy rate was 1.8%, and the rental vacancy rate was 10.2%.

== See also ==
- Choccolocco Creek
