= Abel, Alabama =

Unincorporated community in Alabama, United States

- Unincorporated community
- Location within Alabama Location within the United States
- Coordinates: 33°32′55″N 85°42′45″W
- Country: United States
- State: Alabama
- County: Cleburne
- Elevation: 968 ft (295 m)
- Time zone: UTC-6 (Central (CST))
  - Summer (DST): UTC-5 (CDT)
- GNIS feature ID: 159044

Abel is an unincorporated community in Cleburne County, in the U.S. state of Alabama.

== History ==
A post office was established at Abel in 1889, and remained in operation until it was discontinued in 1907. The community was named after the biblical Abel, the second son of Adam and Eve.

== Demographics ==
According to the census returns from 1850 to 2010 for Alabama, it has never reported a population figure separately on the U.S. Census.
