= Tooktocaugee, Alabama =

- Unincorporated community
- Location within Alabama Location within the United States
- Coordinates: 33°41′35″N 85°41′55″W
- Country: United States
- State: Alabama
- County: Calhoun
- Elevation: 696 ft (212 m)
- Time zone: UTC-6 (Central (CST))
  - Summer (DST): UTC-5 (CDT)
- GNIS feature ID: 162881

Tooktocaugee was an unincorporated community in Calhoun County, Alabama, United States. Tooktocaugee was formerly the site of a Muscogee village.
