= Willie Dee Bowles =

American educator and historian (1912–2000)

Willie Dee Worley Bowles (February 4, 1912 – November 22, 2000) was an American educator and historian. Her 1939 thesis, The History of the Woman Suffrage Movement in Texas, was one of the first attempts to catalogue the history of the women's suffrage movement in the United States.

Bowles was born Willie Dee Worley in Piedmont, Alabama in 1912, and attended the schools of Auburn, Alabama and Rock Hill, South Carolina before beginning her studies at Sam Houston State Teachers' College in Huntsville, Texas in 1926. After graduating from Sam Houston State in 1931, Bowles taught English and Spanish at Alief High School near Houston, Texas until 1934, and then, from 1934 through 1939, taught history at Harlingen High School in Harlingen, Texas. Also in 1934, Bowles entered graduate school at the University of Texas at Austin, where she graduated in 1939 with a master's degree in history. Bowles' thesis, The History of the Woman Suffrage Movement in Texas, was the first historical study of its topic, and one of the first histories of the women's suffrage movement in the United States.

Bowles taught for much of the rest of her life in the schools of San Marcos, Texas, where her husband, Dr. D. Richard Bowles, was a longtime professor of education and director of elementary student training at Southwest Texas State University. In 1987, Bowles was inducted into the San Marcos Women's Hall of Fame.
