= Chosea Springs, Alabama =

Unincorporated community in Alabama, United States

- Unincorporated community
- Location within Alabama Location within the United States
- Coordinates: 33°41′43″N 85°40′25″W
- Country: United States
- State: Alabama
- County: Calhoun
- Elevation: 702 ft (214 m)
- Time zone: UTC-6 (Central (CST))
  - Summer (DST): UTC-5 (CDT)
- Area codes: 256 & 938
- GNIS feature ID: 159875

Chosea Springs, also known as Chosa, Joseph Springs, Hannatown, Hickory Springs, or Hickory Town, is an unincorporated community in Calhoun County, Alabama, United States.

A post office called Chosa was established in 1889, and remained in operation until it was discontinued later that year.
