= Piedmont, Alabama =

City in Alabama, United States

Piedmont
- City
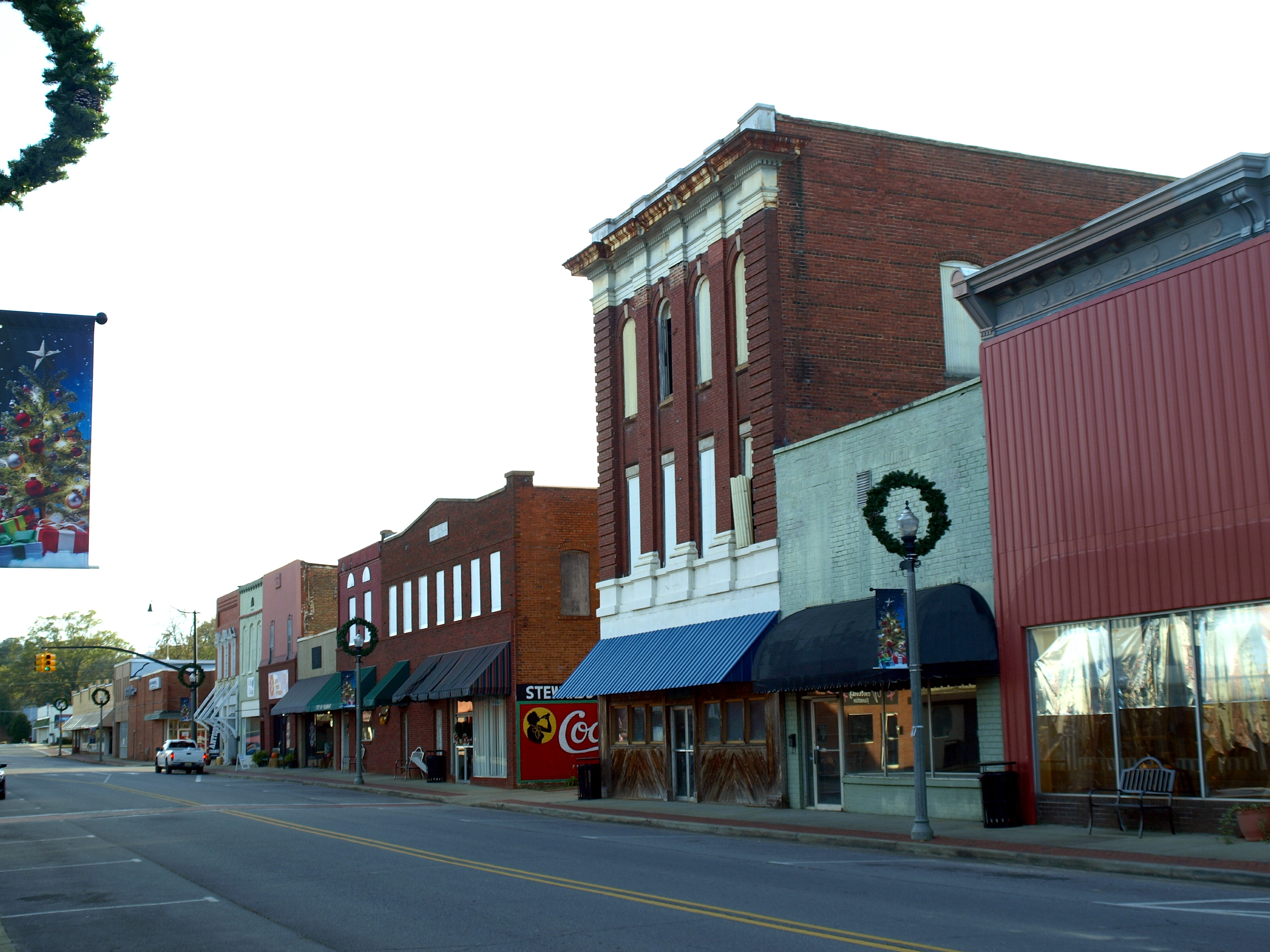
- Buildings on Center Avenue

- Location of Piedmont in Calhoun County and Cherokee County, Alabama
- Coordinates: 33°55′27″N 85°37′43″W
- Country: United States
- State: Alabama
- Counties: Calhoun, Cherokee
- Established: 1888

Government
  - Type: Mayor-Council (7 members)

Area
  - Total: 9.93 sq mi (25.72 km^{2})
  - Land: 9.83 sq mi (25.45 km^{2})
  - Water: 0.10 sq mi (0.27 km^{2})
- Elevation: 712 ft (217 m)

Population (2020)
  - Total: 4,787
  - Density: 487.2/sq mi (188.12/km^{2})
- Time zone: UTC-6 (Central (CST))
  - Summer (DST): UTC-5 (CDT)
- ZIP code: 36272
- Area code: 256
- FIPS code: 01-59640
- GNIS feature ID: 2404515
- Website: www.piedmontcity.org

Piedmont is a city in Calhoun and Cherokee counties in the U.S. state of Alabama. The population was 4,400 at the 2020 census. It is included in the Anniston-Oxford, Alabama Metropolitan Statistical Area.

== History ==
=== Founding and early growth ===
The area now known as Piedmont is a community that began in the early 1840s, located at the crossroads of two early post roads. Major Jacob Forney Dailey of North Carolina came to Alabama in 1848 and bought land in present-day Piedmont. Major Dailey named the area Cross Plains, and an official post office with that name was established on September 22, 1851.

The Standard Coosa-Thatcher Cotton Mill was established in Piedmont in the late 1800s and was the main source of employment in and around the city for nearly a century. After being named "Hollow Stump" and "Cross Plains" local residents settled for the name Piedmont in 1888. The word Piedmont means "Foot of the mountains" which was more appealing to local residents since the city is surrounded by mountainous scenery.

=== Recent history ===
The Standard Coosa-Thatcher Company was a textile corporation founded in Piedmont in 1891. It was publicly traded beginning in 1922. The firm is important because of its endurance for nearly a century and its expansion throughout the southeast United States and into the western United States. Also known in Piedmont as the "Cotton Mill", it began operating in 1892 and closed in 1995. In 2016, demolition of the building began. Over the next two years or so, workers tore down the mill and reclaimed more than 100-year-old lumber and other material for resale.

== Geography ==
According to the United States Census Bureau, the city has a total area of 9.9 square miles (25.6 km^{2}), of which 9.8 square miles (25.4 km^{2}) is land and 0.077 square miles (0.2 km^{2}), or 0.67%, is water. Piedmont lies on the eastern border of the state of Alabama, near the border of Georgia. Piedmont is located between Gadsden Alabama and Cedartown Georgia via US highway 278 (West/East) and between Centre Alabama and Jacksonville Alabama/Jacksonville State University via Alabama highway 21 and Alabama highway 9 (North/South). The nearest interstates are I-59 via US highway 278 (Gadsden) and I-20 via Alabama highway 21 or Alabama highway 9 (Anniston/Oxford).

The city is approximately one and a half hours west of Atlanta, Georgia via US Hwy 278, one and a half hours northeast of Birmingham, 20 minutes north of Anniston, Alabama via AL-21, and 25 minutes east of Gadsden, Alabama via US Hwy 278. The campus of Jacksonville State University in Jacksonville, Alabama is approximately ten miles south of Piedmont via AL-21.

The city is located in the foothills of the Appalachian Mountains chain and is surrounded by mountains on the city's southern and eastern sides. The area is home to Duggar Mountain, which is Alabama's second highest point, only trailing Mt. Cheaha by a small margin. Piedmont is a tourist destination for outdoor enthusiasts due to its close proximity to many nearby hiking trails, streams and rivers, mountains, the Duggar Mountain Wilderness, the Talladega National Forest and Coleman Lake. Weiss Lake is fourteen miles north of Piedmont via AL-9 and is known as "the Crappie Capital of the World." Piedmont is home to Terrapin Creek, which is a destination for kayaking, canoeing, camping, swimming and fishing. Each year, particularly in the summer, thousands of people visit Piedmont and the surrounding areas due to the recreational opportunities and natural environment of the area. Piedmont is also home to the Chief Ladiga Trail, which is a paved trail for walking, jogging and bicycling. The trail runs through downtown Piedmont and runs all the way to Atlanta to the east, and to Anniston, Alabama to the south and west.

Two state highways, AL-9 and AL-21, run through the city limits of Piedmont, as well as US Highway 278. The city and surrounding area is served by the Centre-Piedmont-Cherokee County Regional Airport, which was constructed in 2010. Many surrounding communities are served by the 36272 ZIP code, including Spring Garden, Rock Run, Vigo, Knighten's Crossroads, Ballplay, Pleasant Valley and Nance's Creek. An abundance of people from the surrounding designated census areas and communities make the short commute to the city of Piedmont regularly for employment, commerce, dining, recreation and general shopping. Portions of the nearby communities of Nances Creek, Spring Garden, Piedmont Springs and Vigo rely on police and fire coverage from the city of Piedmont.

== Attractions ==
=== Chief Ladiga Trail ===
Piedmont is home to the Chief Ladiga Trail. The Seaboard/CSX Railroad was converted into a recreational bike and walking trail as a non-motorized way to travel, exercise, and relax while enjoying the outdoors. The Chief Ladiga Trail and the Silver Comet Trail stretch nearly 100 miles (161 km) from Anniston to Atlanta, making it the second-longest paved trail in the United States (the longest being the Paul Bunyan in Minnesota).

Duggar Mountain Wilderness

Dugger Mountain, the second highest peak in Alabama with an elevation of 2,140 feet (650 m), is located just outside the city limits of Piedmont, which is the closest city to the peak and wilderness area.

The wilderness encompasses some of the most rugged and mountainous terrain in Alabama, as well as numerous endangered and threatened plant communities. It is one of the last intact roadless areas in Alabama's National Forests. Most of the mountain's 16,000 acres (6,500 ha) were too steep to profitably timber harvest. The Pinhoti National Recreation Trail winds through the wilderness area.

Duggar Mountain

Standing at 2,140 feet, Duggar Mountain is Alabama's second highest point, only trailing nearby Mt. Cheaha. Duggar Mountain is known for its hiking trails and scenery. Piedmont lies at the foot of Duggar Mountain, making it visible from most points in and around the city.

Terrapin Creek

There are several canoe and kayak rental services near Terrapin Creek, as well as areas to camp and fish. Thousands of people access this area annually to "float the creek" and enjoy the natural environment of the area.

=== Cheaha Challenge ===
Hundreds of cyclists from more than 20 states participate in the Cheaha Challenge every year. The "Toughest Ride in the South" is a recreational bicycle ride that has been moved to Anniston, AL from Piedmont's Civic Center. The ride follows the Appalachian Highlands Scenic Byway then ends at the top of Cheaha Mountain, Alabama's highest point. The Cheaha Challenge was selected as a Top 10 Event in the State of Alabama by the Alabama Bureau of Tourism & Travel.

==== Night in the Museum Hotel ====
This historic home has been relocated from its original location in Piedmont to a location downtown, near the Old Railroad Depot and Museum. Constructed in the late 1800s, this home is believed to be one of the first homes constructed in the Piedmont area. This home is utilized as a two bedroom hotel, as well as a museum. Bedrooms are for rent in the historic Roberts House and include a tour of the museum. The new location of the home is ideal since it is near Piedmont's downtown business district that includes dining, coffee shops, a bar and a variety of stores. The Night in the Museum Hotel is just two blocks from the Chief Ladiga Trail. This exhibit is new to the area and the Roberts House was recently renovated by the city. The Piedmont Historical Society, an IRS qualified 501(c)3 non-profit educational organization that operates the Southern Train Depot Museum, began a preservation project by raising funds and support to first relocate the home to its present site (75 Southern Boulevard) with the purchase of old railroad bed land from Norfolk Southern Railroad Company and second to renovate the home to its original Victorian state, as a safe public museum facility to display artifacts of Piedmont’s history and as a unique “Night In the Museum” Hotel for bikers and hikers of the Chief Ladiga Trail and visitors traveling through the Appalachian Mountains.

==== Piedmont Aquatic Center ====
The Piedmont Aquatic Center is owned and operated by the City of Piedmont. The Aquatic Center offers season passes and day passes and is open through the late spring and summer months. The Aquatic Center features water slides, a large outdoor swimming pool and splash pads. The Aquatic Center is located next to the Piedmont Sports Complex. The annual polar plunge is held at the Aquatic Center and all proceeds go to charity. The polar plunge features residents from the local community and surrounding communities who jump into the cold water in January for purposes of giving to charity.

==== Chief Ladiga Marching Festival ====
This annual event is held in October of each year and features marching bands from all over the state of Alabama competing for a trophy at the end of the ceremony. The event has grown to include marching bands from neighboring Georgia. The Chief Ladiga Marching Festival is held on the campus of Piedmont High School.

==== Southern Railroad Depot Museum ====
The Piedmont Historical Society's Southern Railroad Depot Museum, is an 1867 historic facility registered on the National and Alabama preservation registry. The history of Piedmont, Alabama, a community in northeast Calhoun County, is told by art, cultural and historic displays, exhibits, artifacts and iMovies. A Southern Railroad caboose is displayed adjacent to the original loading dock and cargo cart.

==== Foothills Motocross and Park ====
Foothills Motocross and Park opened to the public in early September 2020. The property contains a dirt track with man made hills to perform stunts. Events are typically held on weekends.

== Media ==
FM radio

- WJCK 88.3 FM (Christian)
- WCKA Alabama 810 AM 94.3 and 97.1 FM broadcasts Piedmont High School football games.

== Demographics ==
Historical population
Census	Pop.	Note	%±
1880	381		—
1890	711		86.6%
1900	1,745		145.4%
1910	2,226		27.6%
1920	2,645		18.8%
1930	3,668		38.7%
1940	4,019		9.6%
1950	4,498		11.9%
1960	4,794		6.6%
1970	5,063		5.6%
1980	5,544		9.5%
1990	5,288		−4.6%
2000	5,120		−3.2%
2010	4,878		−4.7%
2020	4,787		−1.9%
U.S. Decennial Census; 2013 Estimate

=== 2020 census ===
As of the 2020 census, Piedmont had a population of 4,787, with 2,040 households and 1,308 families residing in the city. The median age was 42.4 years. 22.4% of residents were under the age of 18 and 21.5% were 65 years of age or older. For every 100 females, there were 88.2 males, and for every 100 females age 18 and over, there were 84.3 males.

0.0% of residents lived in urban areas, while 100.0% lived in rural areas.

Of occupied households, 31.0% had children under the age of 18 living in them. Of all households, 40.6% were married-couple households, 17.9% were households with a male householder and no spouse or partner present, and 34.5% were households with a female householder and no spouse or partner present. About 30.3% of households were made up of individuals, and 14.8% had someone living alone who was 65 years of age or older.

There were 2,275 housing units, of which 11.8% were vacant. The homeowner vacancy rate was 1.2% and the rental vacancy rate was 6.8%.

Piedmont racial composition
Race	Num.	Perc.
White (non-Hispanic)	3,970	82.93%
Black or African American (non-Hispanic)	445	9.3%
Native American	25	0.52%
Asian	17	0.36%
Pacific Islander	5	0.1%
Other/Mixed	197	4.12%
Hispanic or Latino	128	2.67%

=== 2010 census ===
As of the census of 2010, there were 4,878 people, 2,053 households, and 1,351 families residing in the city. The population density was 497 inhabitants per square mile (192/km^{2}). There were 2,404 housing units at an average density of 242.8 per square mile (93.7/km^{2}). The racial makeup of the city was 87.0% White, 10.0% Black or African American, 0.5% Native American, 0.1% Asian, 0.0% Pacific Islander, 0.5% from other races, and 1.9% from two or more races. Hispanic or Latino people of any race were 1.3% of the population.

In the city, the population was spread out, with 24.0% under the age of 18, 8.2% from 18 to 24, 23.5% from 25 to 44, 27.8% from 45 to 64, and 16.6% who were 65 years of age or older. The median age was 40.5 years. For every 100 females, there were 88.3 males. For every 100 females age 18 and over, there were 86.5 males.

The median income for a household in the city was $31,589, and the median income for a family was $39,417. Males had a median income of $36,332 versus $28,355 for females. The per capita income for the city was $17,573. About 21.1% of families and 24.4% of the population were below the poverty line, including 39.0% of those under age 18 and 9.8% of those age 65 or over.

== Education ==
=== Schools ===
The Piedmont City School District consists of three schools: Piedmont Elementary School, Piedmont Middle School, and Piedmont High School. Piedmont is among the best of the best academically. In the 2022 Alabama State Department of Education report card, Piedmont tied for fourth place.

The Piedmont City Schools athletic teams are known as the Bulldogs. Piedmont High School is a member of the Alabama High School Athletic Association and participates in Class 3A Football, Basketball, Baseball, Wrestling (1A-4A), Golf (Boys 3A, Girls 1A-5A), Volleyball, and indoor, cross country, and outdoor Track. They also have a band: the Piedmont Blue Knights Marching Band. The extracurricular activities compete in class 3A.

The Piedmont High School football team has won 10 region championships in the last 13 years. They've made the state semifinals in each of the last eight years. In that stretch, they've won five state titles and finished runner-up twice. The Piedmont High School baseball team has appeared in the state finals in 2012, 2017, 2019, and 2022. They finished runner-up each of those years. The baseball team currently has 11 straight area championships.

== Notable people ==
- Willie Dee Bowles, educator and historian
- Rick Bragg, writer, 1996 Pulitzer Prize winner
- Desmond Doss, first conscientious objector to receive the Medal of Honor
- William E. Harbour, civil rights activist
- Kenneth A. Roberts, U.S. Representative, 1951–1965
