= Shoal Creek Church =

Historic church in Alabama, United States

- U.S. National Register of Historic Places
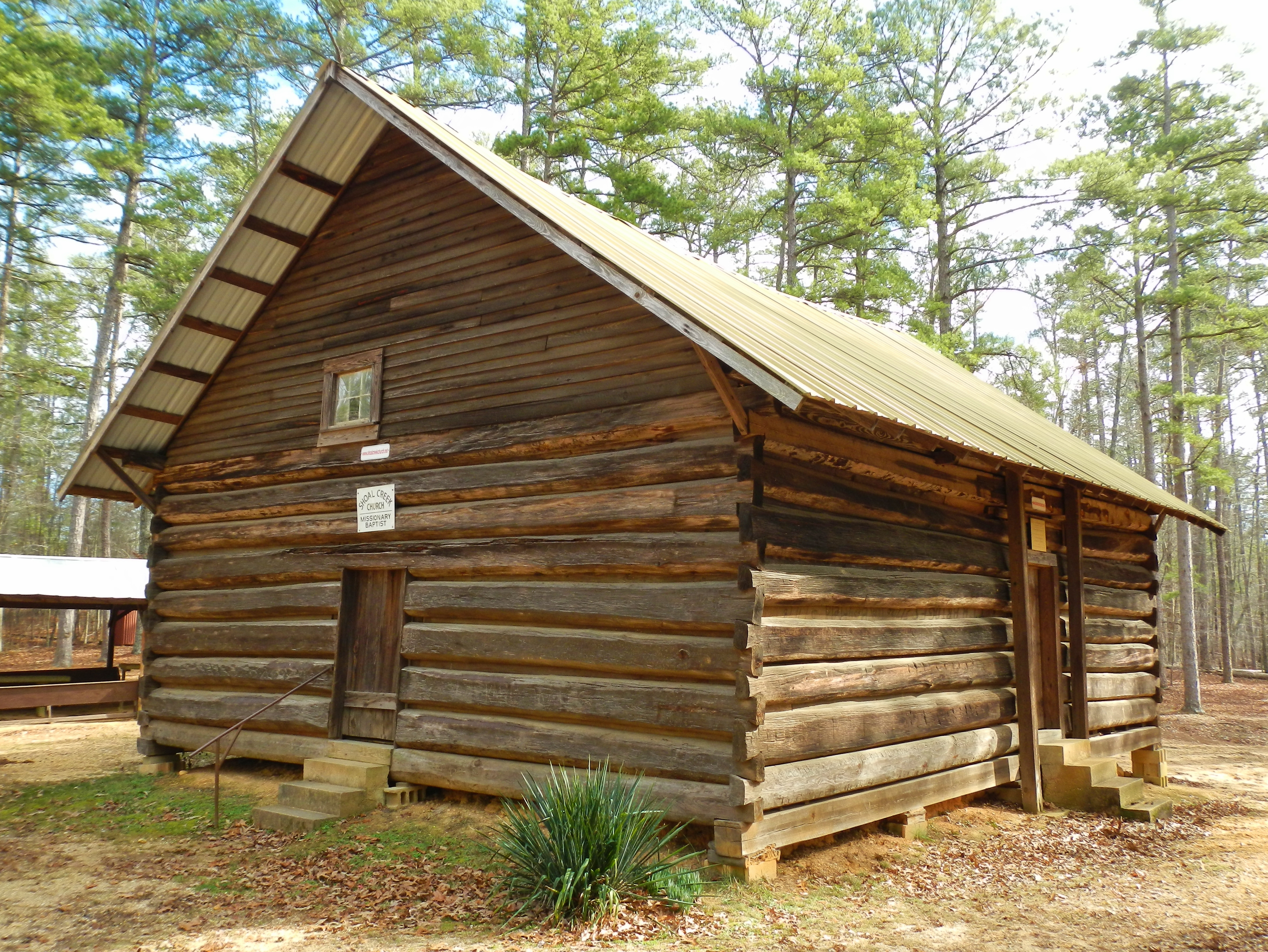
- Shoal Creek Church in 2012

- Location within Alabama Location within the United States
- Nearest city: Edwardsville, Alabama
- Coordinates: 33°46′32″N 85°33′50″W
- Area: 3 acres (1.2 ha)
- Built: 1895
- Architect: Multiple
- NRHP reference No.: 74000404
- Added to NRHP: December 4, 1974

Shoal Creek Baptist Church is a historic church in Talladega National Forest near Edwardsville, Alabama, United States. It was built in 1895 and added to the National Register of Historic Places on December 4, 1974. The present church building is apparently the third to have been built at the site.

There is no record of the formal end of the church fellowship. The church declined due to membership relocation and by 1914 apparently so many had left, that the church no longer met regularly. The last entry in the existing minutes is dated September 6, 1914. Since the cessation of the church fellowship, the building has been used occasionally for family gatherings, weddings, or for church services of a local congregation. Its most regular use has been for an annual Sacred Harp singing.

== Gallery ==
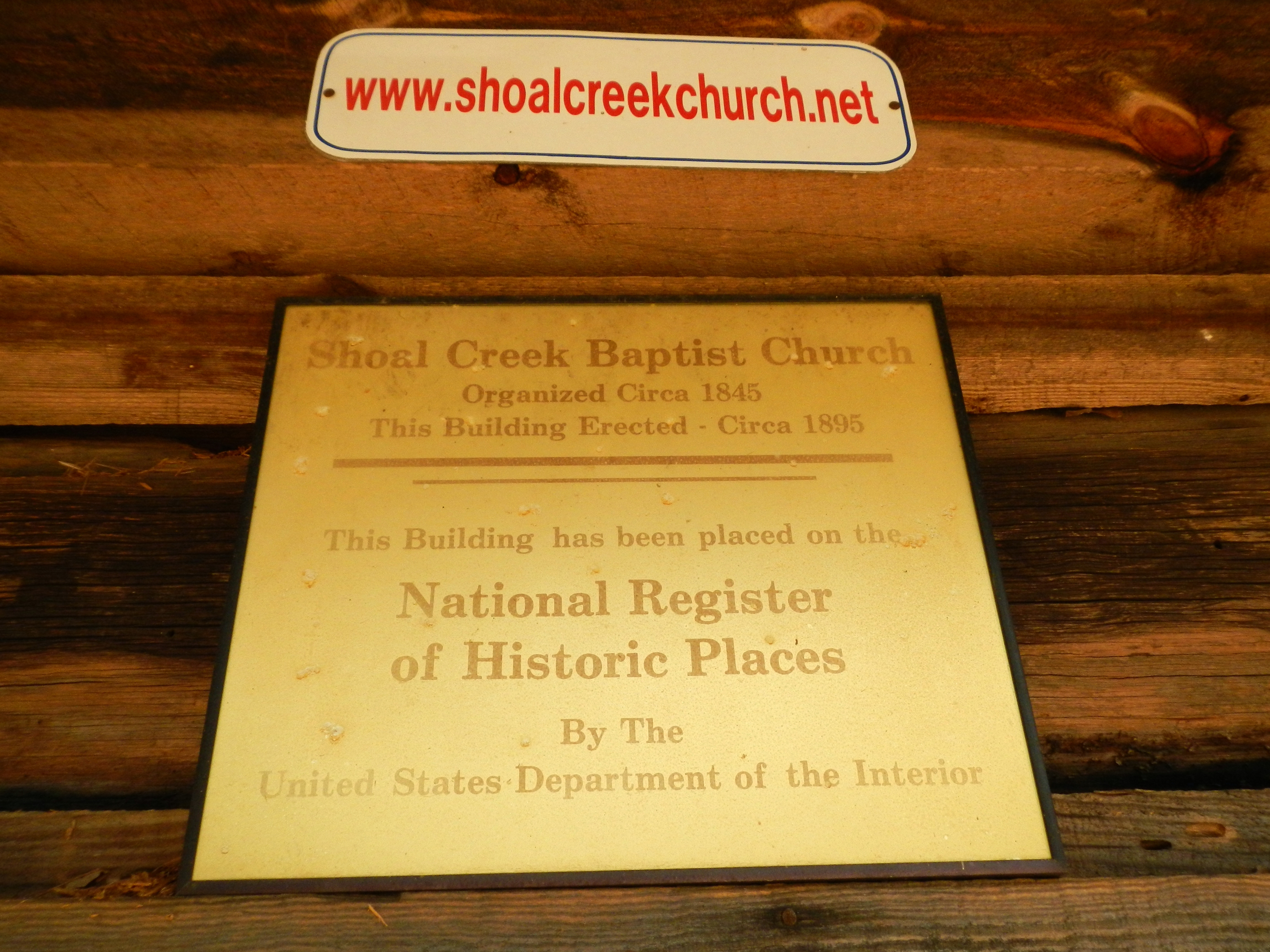
A placard placed by the Department of the Interior commemorating the church's placement on the National Register of Historic Places.

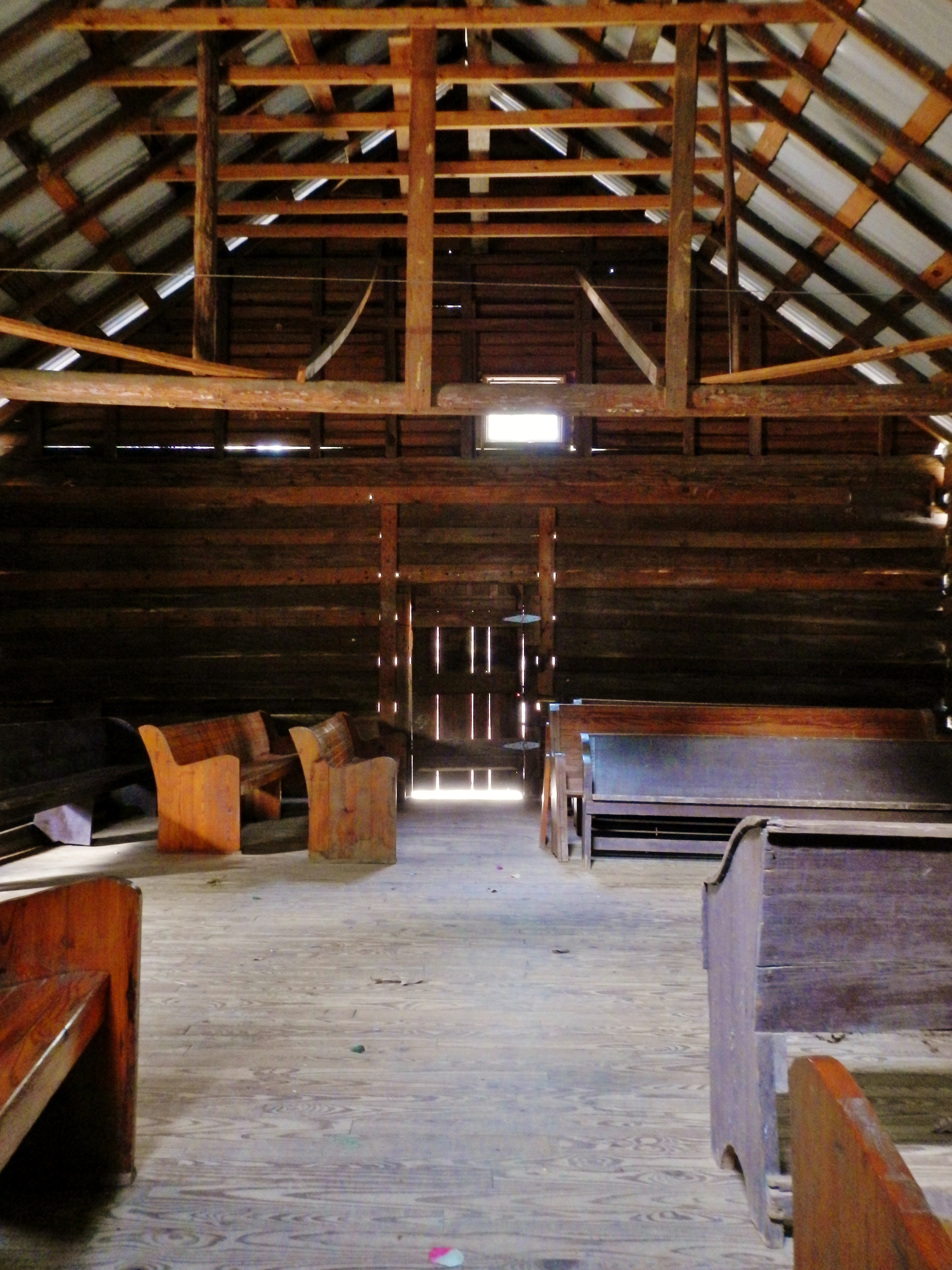
The interior of Shoal Creek Church.
