= Silver Comet Trail =

Multi-use recreational trail in Georgia, United States

Coordinates: 33°50′38.5″N 84°30′5.2″W

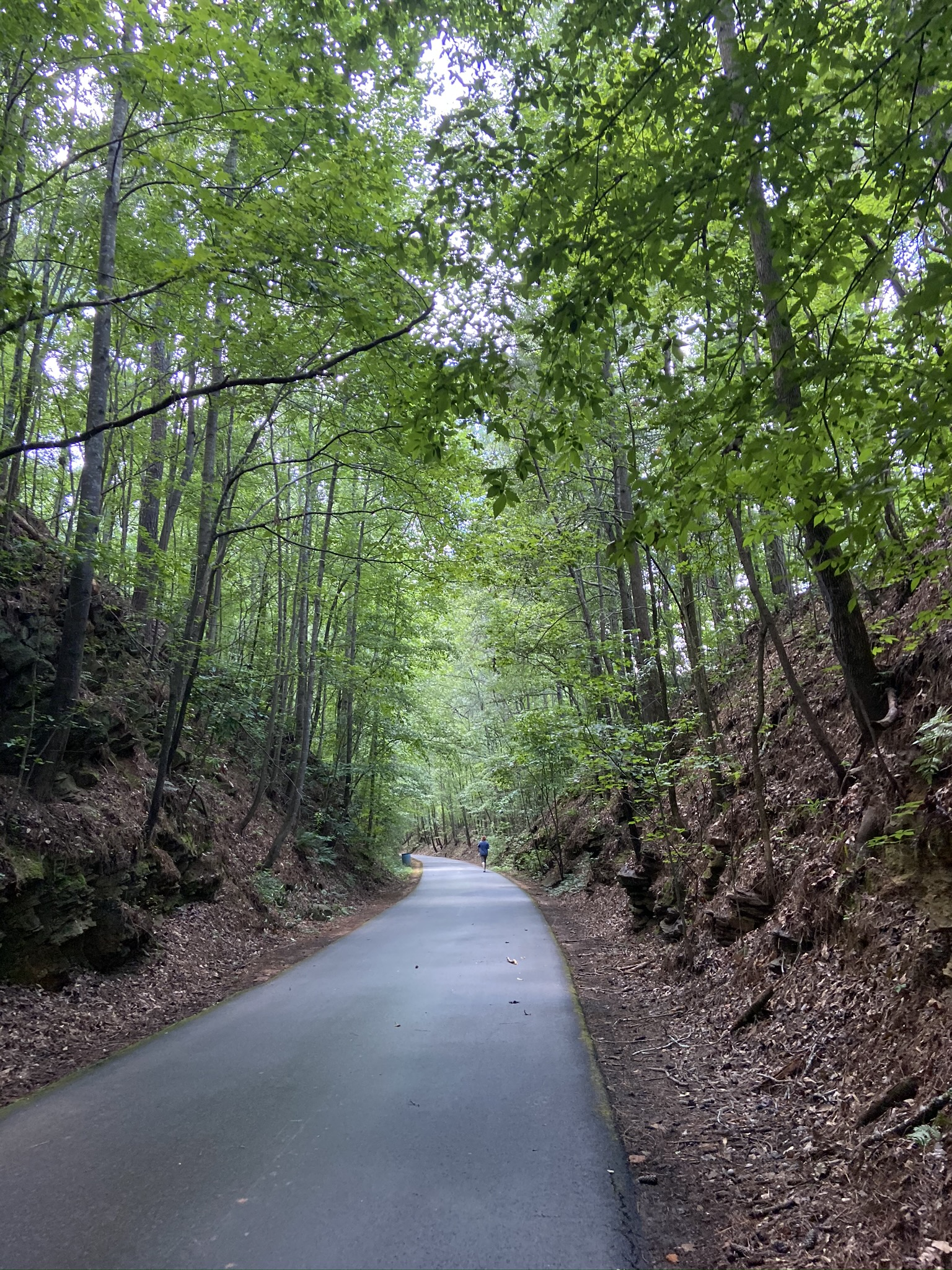
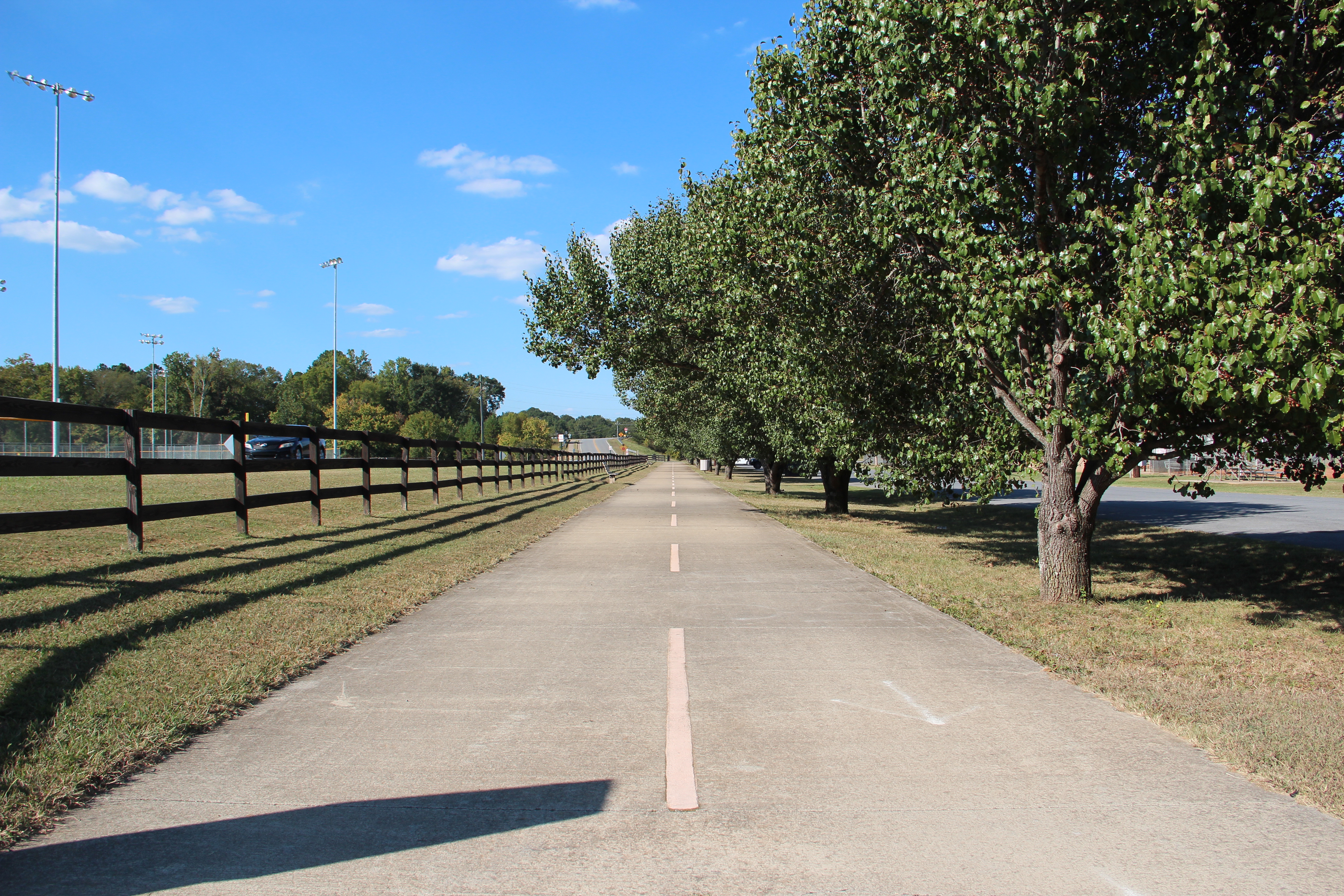
- Top, the Silver Comet Trail in Cobb County; bottom, the trail near Rockmart
- Length: 61.5 mi (99.0 km)
- Location: Northwest Georgia - Northeast Alabama
- Designation: USBR 21 – Cedartown, Atlanta
- Trailheads: Smyrna/Chief Ladiga Trail
- Use: Bicycling, running, hiking, dogs on leash, horseback riding, roller/inline skating, and skateboarding
- Elevation gain/loss: 3,200 ft (East to West on Silver Comet) and 4,000 ft Silver Comet and Chief Ladega
- Lowest point: 628 ft
- Difficulty: Easy to Medium
- Season: Year round
- Sights: Brushy Mt. Tunnel
- Surface: paved
- Right of way: Seaboard System rail line
- Maintainer: Local counties and municipalities
- Website: https://www.pathfoundation.org

The Silver Comet Trail is a rail trail in west-northwestern Georgia, United States.

== Route ==
Map Trail's Path

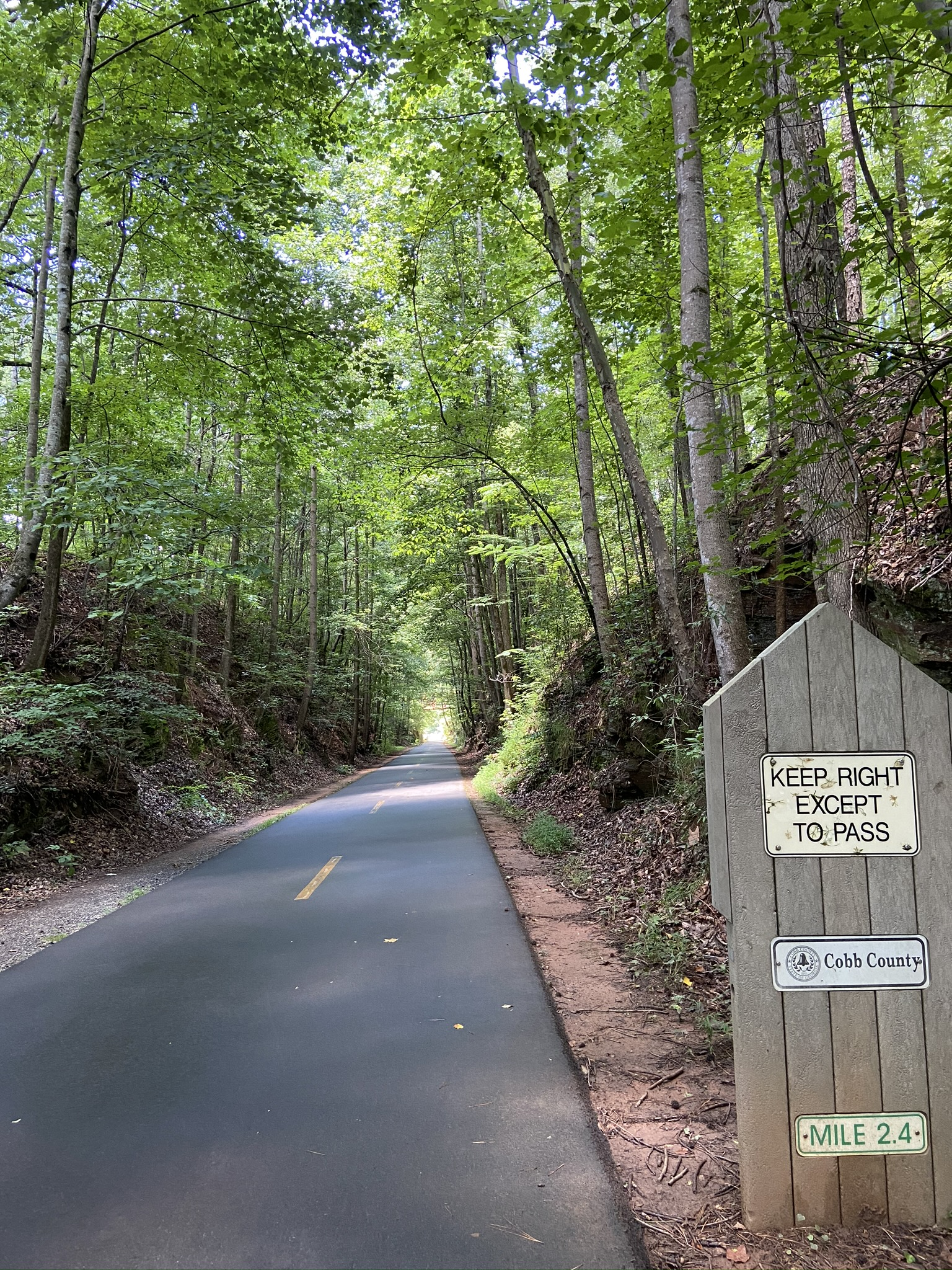
The trail at the 2.4-mile mark, near Heritage Park in Mableton, Georgia

The Silver Comet Trail is named for the Silver Comet passenger train that traversed the same route from 1947 to 1969. It begins in Smyrna, Georgia, runs west through Cobb, Paulding and Polk counties, and continues as Alabama's Chief Ladiga Trail at the state line.

The Silver Comet and Chief Ladiga trails join to form one continuous 94-mile (151 km) trail from Smyrna, Georgia to Anniston, Alabama, which together form the second-longest paved rail trail in the U.S.

U.S. Bicycle Route 21 follows a 52-mile (84 km) portion of Silver Comet Trail from Cedartown to the east end of the trail. The trail is locally known as an ideal destination for bikers and runners to train or relax. Google map here. Path Foundation's map here.

== History ==
In 1947, the Silver Comet was introduced by the Seaboard Air Line Railroad (SAL) during the height of passenger rail use. Due to declining ridership, the Silver Comet was downgraded in the 1960s, losing its sleeper-lounger cars. In 1969, the Silver Comet was downgraded again and finally discontinued in June of that year, by SAL successor Seaboard Coast Line (SCL).

By 1986 SCL had gradually merged with several nearby railroads, forming the Seaboard System, which had become CSX Transportation by July 1987. CSX abandoned 36 miles (58 km) of the former Silver Comet route from Cobb County through Paulding and Polk counties in 1989. In 1992, the Georgia Department of Transportation initially purchased the former roadbed for future use as a high-speed transit route, but later that year, Ron Griffith, Director of Cobb County Parks, requested a lease agreement between the county and the Georgia DOT to use the rail line as a multi-use trail. The Cobb County Board of Commissioners approved the multi-use trail plan in November.

Construction began in July 1998, with the initial section between Nickajack Creek and Hicks Road opening by that November.

The former SAL/SCL right of way is rail banked. This means at any time in the future, if rail traffic increases to the point where an old line exists, it could be purchased and track put back down. The right of way would thus become a Class 1 railroad again. The former SAL/SCL line is 78 miles shorter than the line CSXT now uses, the former ACL, and Atlanta & West Point lines, which run well south of the former SAL/SCL line.

In September 2019 the James M. Cox Foundation gave $6 million to the PATH Foundation, which will connect the Silver Comet Trail to the Atlanta Beltline. This project has been split into two parts. The PATH Foundation is responsible for the section from the current Silver Comet Trail terminus at the Mavell Road trailhead and then following the abandoned railroad right of way to Plant Atkinson Road. The Cobb DOT is responsible for the section from Plant Atkinson road to the Atlanta Road/Marietta Boulevard bridge over the Chattahoochee river, following an easement along Atlanta Road. Cobb expects to let its section for bid in Spring 2023. PATH's section is in flux due to legal challenges from railroad right of way easement holders.

== Economic impact ==
In 2013, a detailed study was done on the trail to determine the economic impact of the trail. It was estimated that the trail had 1.9 million uses in 2013. 400,000 of those uses were from out of state. The direct spending of residents and tourists was $57 million. The $118 million economic impact was found to support 1,310 jobs.

The tax revenue generated by the trail was estimated to be about $3.5 million in income tax, sales tax, and business taxes. The study suggested an 4 to 7 increase in property taxes for homes within a quarter mile of the trail, resulting in an increase of $0.5 million in revenue for municipalities and school districts.

== Geology ==
In Paulding County, the Silver Comet Trail crosses over the Allatoona Fault; where the trail intersects the fault in the vicinity of Willow Springs Road, the fault serves to divide the distinctive Eastern Blue Ridge rocks from those that most characterize the Western Blue Ridge Province. One rock formation of particular note in Paulding County is the Ordovician-age Pumpkinvine Creek Formation (PCF), primarily composed of metamorphosed volcanic rocks thought to have originated out in the now-vanished, ancient ocean that geologists generally refer to as Iapetus.

The meta-volcanic rocks of the PCF are believed to be remnants of the sort of so-called "accreted terranes" described above, and exposures of PCF rocks can be found on the Silver Comet Trail near the Allatoona Fault.

== See also ==
- Chief Ladiga Trail
