= Trickem, Cleburne County, Alabama =

Unincorporated community in Alabama, United States

Trickum, Alabama
- Unincorporated community
- Location within Alabama Location within the United States
- Coordinates: 33°33′22″N 85°24′40″W
- Country: United States
- State: Alabama
- County: Cleburne
- Elevation: 1,060 ft (320 m)
- Time zone: UTC-6 (Central (CST))
  - Summer (DST): UTC-5 (CDT)
- Area codes: 256 & 938
- GNIS feature ID: 157172

Trickem is an unincorporated community in Cleburne County, Alabama, United States.

== History ==
The community's name is derived from Tri-Com, which is a shortened form of Tri-Communities Church, which was another name for the local Mt. Giliard Church. The post office operated from 1891 to 1903.
