= Piedmont City School District =

School district in Alabama, United States

Address
- 502 Hood St W Piedmont, Alabama, 36272; United States

District information
- Type: Public
- Grades: PreK–12
- NCES District ID: 0102760

Students and staff
- Students: 1,155
- Teachers: 65.29
- Staff: 50.25
- Student–teacher ratio: 17.69

Other information
- Website: www.piedmont.k12.al.us

Piedmont City School District is a school district in Calhoun County, Alabama, USA.
