= Calhoun County, Alabama =

County in Alabama, United States

- County
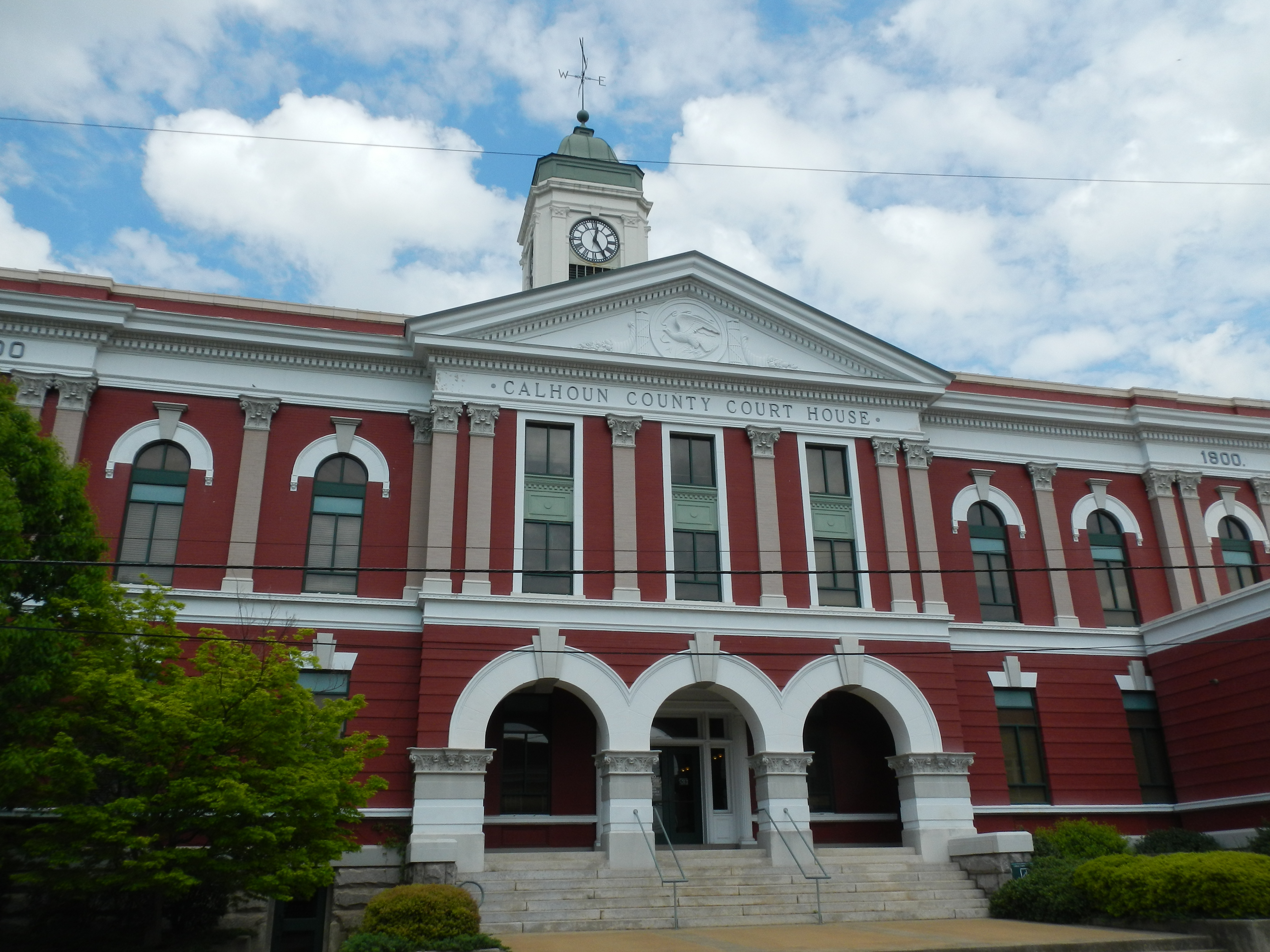
- Calhoun County Courthouse in Anniston

- Seal

- Location within the U.S. state of Alabama
- Coordinates: 33°46′10″N 85°49′15″W
- Country: United States
- State: Alabama
- Founded: December 18, 1832 as Benton County
- Named for: John C. Calhoun
- Seat: Anniston
- Largest city: Oxford

Area
  - Total: 612 sq mi (1,590 km^{2})
  - Land: 606 sq mi (1,570 km^{2})
  - Water: 6.4 sq mi (17 km^{2}) 1.0%

Population (2020)
  - Total: 116,441
  - Estimate (2025): 115,834 ▼
  - Density: 192/sq mi (74.2/km^{2})
- Time zone: UTC−6 (Central)
  - Summer (DST): UTC−5 (CDT)
- Congressional district: 3rd
- Website: www.calhouncounty.org
- County Number 11 on Alabama License Plates

Calhoun County is a county in the east central part of the U.S. state of Alabama. As of the 2020 census, the population was 116,441. Its county seat is Anniston. It is named in honor of John C. Calhoun, a US Senator from South Carolina.

Calhoun County comprises the Anniston-Oxford Metropolitan Statistical Area.

== History ==
Benton County was established on December 18, 1832, named for Thomas Hart Benton, a member of the United States Senate from Missouri. Its county seat was Jacksonville. Benton, an enslaver, was a political ally of John C. Calhoun, a U.S. senator from South Carolina, and also a slaveholder and planter. Through the 1820s-1840s, however, Benton's and Calhoun's political interests diverged. Calhoun was increasingly interested in using the threat of secession as a weapon to maintain and expand slavery throughout the United States. Benton, on the other hand, was slowly concluding that slavery was wrong and that the preservation of the union was paramount. On January 29, 1858, Alabama supporters of slavery, objecting to Benton's change of heart, renamed Benton County as Calhoun County.

During the Reconstruction era and widespread violence by whites to suppress black and white Republican voting in the state during the campaign for the 1870 gubernatorial election, four blacks and one white were lynched.

After years of controversy and a State Supreme Court ruling in June 1900, the county seat was moved to Anniston.

The county was hit by an F4 tornado during the 1994 Palm Sunday tornado outbreak on March 27, 1994. Twelve minutes after the National Weather Service of Birmingham issued a tornado warning for northern Calhoun, southeastern Etowah, and southern Cherokee counties, the tornado destroyed Piedmont's Goshen United Methodist Church.

== Geography ==
According to the United States Census Bureau, the county has a total area of 612 square miles (1,590 km^{2}), of which 606 square miles (1,570 km^{2}) is land and 6.4 square miles (17 km^{2}) (1.0%) is water.

=== Adjacent counties ===
- Cherokee County - northeast
- Cleburne County - east
- Talladega County - south
- St. Clair County - west
- Etowah County - northwest

=== National protected areas ===
- Mountain Longleaf National Wildlife Refuge
- Talladega National Forest (part)

== Transportation ==
=== Major highways ===
- Interstate 20
- U.S. Highway 78 / State Route 4 (unsigned)
- U.S. Highway 278 / State Route 74 (unsigned)
- U.S. Highway 431 / State Route 1 (unsigned)
- State Route 9
- State Route 21
- State Route 144
- State Route 200
- State Route 202
- State Route 204
- State Route 301

=== Rail ===
- Alabama and Tennessee River Railway
- Norfolk Southern Railway
- Amtrak (Crescent)

=== Transit ===
- Areawide Community Transportation System

== Demographics ==
Historical population
Census	Pop.	Note	%±
1840	14,260		—
1850	17,163		20.4%
1860	21,539		25.5%
1870	13,980		−35.1%
1880	19,591		40.1%
1890	33,835		72.7%
1900	34,874		3.1%
1910	39,115		12.2%
1920	47,822		22.3%
1930	55,611		16.3%
1940	63,319		13.9%
1950	79,539		25.6%
1960	95,878		20.5%
1970	103,092		7.5%
1980	119,761		16.2%
1990	116,034		−3.1%
2000	112,249		−3.3%
2010	118,572		5.6%
2020	116,441		−1.8%
2025 (est.)	115,834	▼	−0.5%
U.S. Decennial Census; 1790–1960 1900–1990; 1990–2000 2010–2020

=== 2020 census ===
As of the 2020 census, the county had a population of 116,441. The median age was 40.0 years. 20.7% of residents were under the age of 18 and 18.4% of residents were 65 years of age or older. For every 100 females there were 92.0 males, and for every 100 females age 18 and over there were 89.0 males age 18 and over.

The racial makeup of the county was 69.2% White, 22.0% Black or African American, 0.4% American Indian and Alaska Native, 1.0% Asian, 0.1% Native Hawaiian and Pacific Islander, 2.1% from some other race, and 5.2% from two or more races. Hispanic or Latino residents of any race comprised 4.3% of the population.

63.5% of residents lived in urban areas, while 36.5% lived in rural areas.

There were 46,437 households in the county, of which 28.5% had children under the age of 18 living with them and 31.5% had a female householder with no spouse or partner present. About 30.4% of all households were made up of individuals and 13.0% had someone living alone who was 65 years of age or older.

There were 53,052 housing units, of which 12.5% were vacant. Among occupied housing units, 68.4% were owner-occupied and 31.6% were renter-occupied. The homeowner vacancy rate was 1.9% and the rental vacancy rate was 12.2%.

=== Racial and ethnic composition ===
Calhoun County, Alabama – Racial and ethnic composition Note: the US Census treats Hispanic/Latino as an ethnic category. This table excludes Latinos from the racial categories and assigns them to a separate category. Hispanics/Latinos may be of any race.
Race / Ethnicity (NH = Non-Hispanic)	Pop 2000	Pop 2010	Pop 2020	% 2000	% 2010	% 2020
White alone (NH)	87,598	87,285	79,519	78.04%	73.61%	68.29%
Black or African American alone (NH)	20,725	24,177	23,365	18.46%	20.39%	21.78%
Native American or Alaska Native alone (NH)	427	480	386	0.38%	0.40%	0.33%
Asian alone (NH)	625	830	1,164	0.56%	0.70%	1.00%
Pacific Islander alone (NH)	74	94	112	0.07%	0.08%	0.10%
Other race alone (NH)	85	109	317	0.08%	0.09%	0.27%
Mixed race or Multiracial (NH)	862	1,704	4,568	0.86%	1.44%	3.92%
Hispanic or Latino (any race)	1,753	3,893	5,010	1.56%	3.28%	4.30%
Total	112,249	118,572	116,441	100.00%	100.00%	100.00%

=== 2010 census ===
As of the census of 2010, there were 118,572 people, 47,331 households, and 31,609 families residing in the county. The population density was 194 people per square mile (75 people/km^{2}). There were 53,289 housing units at an average density of 87 units per square mile (34 units/km^{2}). The racial makeup of the county was 74.9% White, 20.6% Black or African American, 0.5% Native American, 0.7% Asian, 0.1% Pacific Islander, 1.6% from other races, and 1.7% from two or more races. 3.3% of the population were Hispanic or Latino of any race.

There were 47,331 households, out of which 26.7% had children under the age of 18 living with them, 46.8% were married couples living together, 15.2% had a female householder with no husband present, and 33.2% were non-families. 27.7% of all households were made up of individuals, and 10.2% had someone living alone who was 65 years of age or older. The average household size was 2.44 and the average family size was 2.97.

In the county, the population was spread out, with 22.9% under the age of 18, 10.9% from 18 to 24, 24.8% from 25 to 44, 27.1% from 45 to 64, and 14.3% who were 65 years of age or older. The median age was 38.2 years. For every 100 females there were 93.1 males. For every 100 females age 18 and over, there were 94.8 males.

The median income for a household in the county was $38,407, and the median income for a family was $49,532. Males had a median income of $41,599 versus $29,756 for females. The per capita income for the county was $20,574. About 15.2% of families and 19.5% of the population were below the poverty line, including 26.8% of those under age 18 and 10.9% of those age 65 or over.

== Education ==
Calhoun County contains five public school districts. There are approximately 17,000 students in public K-12 schools in Calhoun County. Public school districts are not conterminous with the county boundary.

The county contains two public higher education institutions. Gadsden State Community College operates a campus located in Anniston, and Jacksonville State University, founded in 1883 and with an enrollment of over 9,000 students, is located in Jacksonville.

=== Districts ===
School districts include:

- Anniston City School District
- Calhoun County School District
- Jacksonville City School District
- Oxford City School District
- Piedmont City School District

== Politics ==
The last Democrat to win a majority in the county was Jimmy Carter in 1976. In 2016 and 2020, Republican Donald Trump won more than two-thirds of the county's vote.

United States presidential election results for Calhoun County, Alabama
Year	Republican		Democratic		Third party(ies)	
Year	No.	%	No.	%	No.	%
1836	287	31.06%	637	68.94%	0	0.00%
1840	482	27.86%	1,248	72.14%	0	0.00%
1844	373	21.25%	1,382	78.75%	0	0.00%
1848	566	30.79%	1,272	69.21%	0	0.00%
1852	74	7.46%	918	92.54%	0	0.00%
1856	0	0.00%	1,687	79.20%	443	20.80%
1860	0	0.00%	54	1.95%	2,711	98.05%
1868	600	32.02%	1,274	67.98%	0	0.00%
1872	400	18.48%	1,764	81.52%	0	0.00%
1876	421	17.11%	2,040	82.89%	0	0.00%
1880	509	20.32%	1,984	79.20%	12	0.48%
1884	1,066	34.32%	2,035	65.52%	5	0.16%
1888	938	25.85%	2,680	73.87%	10	0.28%
1892	218	4.29%	3,249	63.91%	1,617	31.81%
1896	1,222	28.45%	2,788	64.90%	286	6.66%
1900	567	21.13%	1,835	68.37%	282	10.51%
1904	287	14.85%	1,556	80.50%	90	4.66%
1908	570	26.87%	1,438	67.80%	113	5.33%
1912	238	10.07%	1,666	70.47%	460	19.46%
1916	442	16.21%	2,231	81.81%	54	1.98%
1920	1,139	24.76%	3,423	74.40%	39	0.85%
1924	766	27.17%	1,907	67.65%	146	5.18%
1928	2,537	54.50%	2,117	45.48%	1	0.02%
1932	684	13.39%	4,392	86.00%	31	0.61%
1936	581	11.71%	4,322	87.12%	58	1.17%
1940	645	12.72%	4,408	86.93%	18	0.35%
1944	694	13.80%	4,308	85.65%	28	0.56%
1948	856	20.47%	0	0.00%	3,325	79.53%
1952	3,064	27.37%	8,023	71.68%	106	0.95%
1956	4,473	32.18%	9,069	65.24%	358	2.58%
1960	4,821	33.17%	9,590	65.97%	125	0.86%
1964	10,635	63.13%	0	0.00%	6,210	36.87%
1968	3,061	11.43%	4,146	15.48%	19,568	73.08%
1972	20,364	76.93%	5,832	22.03%	275	1.04%
1976	11,763	35.97%	20,466	62.59%	471	1.44%
1980	17,475	49.17%	17,017	47.88%	1,049	2.95%
1984	23,291	61.16%	12,752	33.49%	2,039	5.35%
1988	19,806	58.31%	12,451	36.66%	1,711	5.04%
1992	20,623	48.18%	16,453	38.44%	5,724	13.37%
1996	18,088	49.00%	15,725	42.60%	3,098	8.39%
2000	22,306	57.33%	15,781	40.56%	822	2.11%
2004	29,814	65.89%	15,083	33.33%	352	0.78%
2008	32,348	65.69%	16,334	33.17%	560	1.14%
2012	30,278	65.30%	15,511	33.45%	575	1.24%
2016	32,865	68.66%	13,242	27.67%	1,757	3.67%
2020	35,101	68.85%	15,216	29.85%	666	1.31%
2024	34,912	71.76%	13,194	27.12%	547	1.12%

United States Senate election results for Calhoun County, Alabama2
Year	Republican		Democratic		Third party(ies)	
Year	No.	%	No.	%	No.	%
2020	33,936	66.78%	16,808	33.07%	77	0.15%

United States Senate election results for Calhoun County, Alabama3
Year	Republican		Democratic		Third party(ies)	
Year	No.	%	No.	%	No.	%
2022	22,008	73.16%	7,365	24.48%	708	2.35%

Alabama Gubernatorial election results for Calhoun County
Year	Republican		Democratic		Third party(ies)	
Year	No.	%	No.	%	No.	%
2022	22,158	73.56%	6,912	22.95%	1,052	3.49%

Calhoun is part of Alabama's 3rd congressional district, which is held by Republican Mike D. Rogers.

== Communities ==
=== Cities ===
- Anniston (County Seat)
- Glencoe (partly in Etowah County)
- Jacksonville
- Oxford (partly in Talladega County and Cleburne County)
- Piedmont (partly in Cherokee County)
- Southside (partly in Etowah County)
- Weaver

=== Towns ===
- Hobson City
- Ohatchee

=== Census-designated places ===
- Alexandria
- Choccolocco
- Nances Creek
- Saks
- West End-Cobb Town
- White Plains

=== Unincorporated communities ===
- Bynum
- Chosea Springs
- DeArmanville
- Eastaboga (partly in Talladega County)
- Iron City
- Macon
- Merrellton
- Peaceburg
- Possum Trot
- Wellington

=== Ghost towns ===
- Minden
- Tooktocaugee

== Places of interest ==
Calhoun County is home to Jacksonville State University, the Anniston Museum of Natural History, the Berman Museum of World History, and the Coldwater Covered Bridge. It also contains a portion of the Talladega National Forest.

== See also ==
- National Register of Historic Places listings in Calhoun County, Alabama
- Properties on the Alabama Register of Landmarks and Heritage in Calhoun County, Alabama
- German Italian Memorial Cemetery
