= Geography of Alabama =

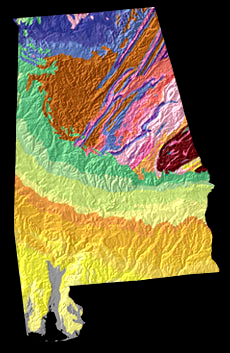
Physiographic regions in Alabama

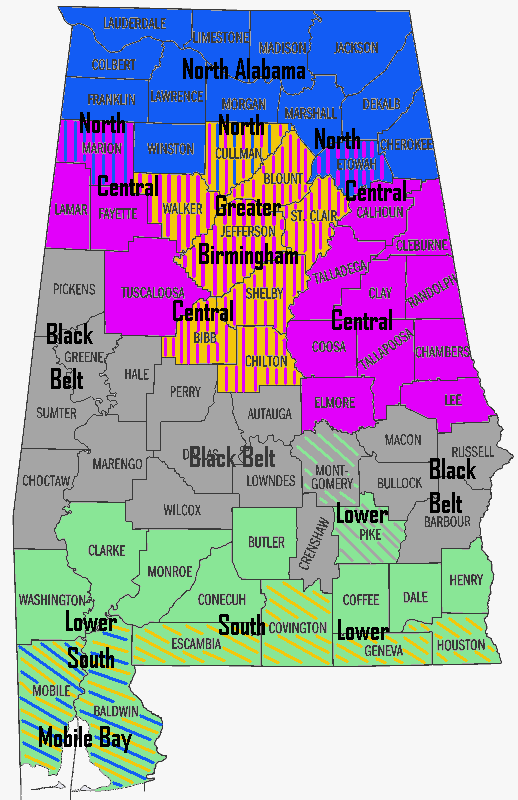
Political Regions of Alabama

The geography of Alabama describes a state in the Southeastern United States in North America. It extends from high mountains to low valleys and sandy beaches. Alabama is 30th in size and borders four U.S. states: Mississippi, Tennessee, Georgia, and Florida. It also borders the Gulf of Mexico.

== Physical features ==
Extending entirely across the state of Alabama for about 20 miles (32 km) northern boundary, and in the middle stretching 60 miles (97 km) farther north, is the Cumberland Plateau, or Tennessee Valley region, broken into broad tablelands by the dissection of rivers. In the northern part of this plateau, west of Jackson county, there are about 1,000 square miles (2,600 km^{2}) of level highlands from 700 to 800 feet (210 to 240 m) above sea level. South of these highlands, occupying a narrow strip on each side of the Tennessee River, is a country of gentle rolling lowlands varying in elevation from 500 to 800 feet (150 to 240 m). To the northeast of these highlands and lowlands is a rugged section with steep mountain-sides, deep narrow coves and valleys, and flat mountain-tops. Its elevations range from 400 to 1,800 feet (120 to 550 m). In the remainder of this region, the southern portion, the most prominent feature is Little Mountain, extending about 80 miles (129 km) from east to west between two valleys, and rising precipitously on the north side 500 feet (150 m) above them or 1,000 feet (300 m) above the sea.

Adjoining the Cumberland Plateau region on the southeast is the Appalachian Valley (locally known as Coosa Valley) region, which is the southern extremity of the Appalachian Mountains, and occupies an area within the state of about 8,000 square miles (21,000 km^{2}). This is a limestone belt with parallel hard rock ridges left standing by erosion to form mountains. Although the general direction of the mountains, ridges, and valleys is northeast and southwest, irregularity is one of the most prominent characteristics. In the northeast are several flat-topped mountains, of which Raccoon and Lookout are the most prominent, having a maximum elevation near the Georgia line of little more than 1,800 feet (550 m) and gradually decreasing in height toward the southwest, where Sand Mountain is a continuation of Raccoon. South of these the mountains are marked by steep northwest sides, sharp crests and gently sloping southeast sides.

Southeast of the Appalachian Valley region, the Piedmont Plateau also crosses the Alabama border from the N.E. and occupies a small triangular-shaped section of which Randolph and Clay counties, together with the northern part of Tallapoosa and Chambers, form the principal portion. Its surface is gently undulating and has an elevation of about 1,000 feet (300 m) above sea level. The Piedmont Plateau is a lowland worn down by erosion on hard crystalline rocks, then uplifted to form a plateau.

The remainder of the state is occupied by the Coastal Plain. This is crossed by foothills and rolling prairies in the central part of the state, where it has a mean elevation of about 600 feet (180 m), becomes lower and more level toward the southwest, and in the extreme south is flat and but slightly elevated above the sea. The Cumberland Plateau region is drained to the west-northwest by the Tennessee River and its tributaries; all other parts of the state are drained to the southwest. In the Appalachian Valley region the Coosa River is the principal river; and in the Piedmont Plateau, the Tallapoosa River. In the Coastal Plain are the Tombigbee River in the west, the Alabama River (formed by the Coosa and Tallapoosa) in the western central, and in the east the Chattahoochee River, which forms almost half of the Georgia boundary. The Tombigbee and Alabama rivers unite near the southwest corner of the state, their waters discharging into Mobile Bay by the Mobile and Tensas rivers. The Black Warrior River is a considerable stream which joins the Tombigbee from the east.

The valleys in the north and northeast are usually deep and narrow, but in the Coastal Plain they are broad and in most cases rise in three successive terraces above the stream. The harbour of Mobile was formed by the drowning of the lower part of the valley of the Alabama and Tombigbee rivers as a result of the sinking of the land here, such sinking having occurred on other parts of the Gulf coast...

== Flora and fauna ==
The fauna and flora of Alabama are similar to those of the Gulf states in general and have no distinctive characteristics. However, the Mobile River system has a high incidence of endemism among freshwater mollusks and biodiversity is high.

In Alabama, vast forests of pine constitute the largest proportion of the state's forest growth. There is also an abundance of cypress, hickory, oak, populus, and eastern redcedar trees. In other areas, hemlock growths in the north and southern white cedar in the southwest. Other native trees include ash, hackberry, and holly. In the Gulf region of the state grow various species of palmetto and palm. In Alabama there are more than 150 shrubs, including mountain laurel and rhododendron. Among cultivated plants are wisteria and camellia.

While in the past the state enjoyed a variety of mammals such as plains bison, eastern elk, North American cougar, bear, and deer, only the white-tailed deer remains abundant. Still fairly common are the bobcat, American beaver, muskrat, raccoon, Virginia opossum, rabbit, squirrel, red and gray foxes, and long-tailed weasel. Coypu and Mexican long-nosed armadillo have been introduced to the state and now also common.

Alabama's birds include golden and bald eagles, osprey and other hawks, yellow-shafted flickers, and black-and-white warblers. Game birds include bobwhite quail, duck, wild turkey, and goose. Freshwater fish such as bream, shad, bass, and sucker are common. Along the Gulf Coast there are seasonal runs of tarpon, pompano, red drum, and bonito.

The U.S. Fish and Wildlife Service lists as endangered 99 animals, fish, and birds, and 18 plant species. The endangered animals include the Alabama beach mouse, gray bat, Alabama red-bellied turtle, fin and humpback whales, bald eagle, and wood stork.

American black bear, racking horse, yellow-shafted flicker, wild turkey, Atlantic tarpon, largemouth bass, southern longleaf pine, eastern tiger swallowtail, monarch butterfly, Alabama red-bellied turtle, Red Hills salamander, camellia, oak-leaf hydrangea, peach, pecan, and blackberry are Alabama's state symbols.

== Climate and soil ==
The climate of Alabama is humid subtropical.

The heat of summer is tempered in the south by the winds from the Gulf of Mexico, and in the north by the elevation above the sea. The average annual temperature is highest in the southwest along the coast, and lowest in the northeast among the highlands. Thus at Mobile the annual mean is 67 °F (19 °C), the mean for the summer 81 °F (27 °C), and for the winter 52 °F (11 °C); and at Valley Head, in De Kalb county, the annual mean is 59 °F (15 °C), the mean for the summer 75 °F (24 °C), and for the winter 41 °F (5 °C). At Montgomery, in the central region, the average annual temperature is 66 °F (19 °C), with a winter average of 49 °F (9 °C), and a summer average of 81 °F (27 °C). The average winter minimum for the entire state is 35 °F (2 °C), and there is an average of 35 days in each year in which the thermometer falls below the freezing-point. At extremely rare intervals the thermometer has fallen below zero (-18 °C), as was the case in the remarkable cold wave of the 12th-13 February 1899, when an absolute minimum of −17 °F (−27 °C) was registered at Valley Head. The highest temperature ever recorded was 109 °F (43 °C) in Talladega county in 1902.

The amount of precipitation is greatest along the coast (62 inches/1,574 mm) and evenly distributed through the rest of the state (about 52 inches/1,320 mm). During each winter there is usually one fall of snow in the south and two in the north; but the snow quickly disappears, and sometimes, during an entire winter, the ground is not covered with snow. Heavy snowfall can occur, such as during the New Year's Eve 1963 snowstorm and the 1993 Storm of the Century. Hailstorms occur occasionally in the spring and summer, but are seldom destructive. Heavy fogs are rare, and are confined chiefly to the coast. Thunderstorms occur throughout the year - they are most common in the summer, but most severe in the spring and fall, when destructive winds and tornadoes occasionally occur. The prevailing winds are from the news. Hurricanes are quite common in the state, especially in the southern part, and major hurricanes occasionally strike the coast which can be very destructive.

As regards its soil, Alabama may be divided into four regions. Extending from the Gulf northward for about 150 miles (240 km) is the outer belt of the Coastal Plain, also called the Timber Belt, whose soil is sandy and poor, but responds well to fertilization. North of this is the inner lowland of the Coastal Plain, or the Black Prairie, which includes some 13,000 square miles (34,000 km^{2}) and seventeen counties. It receives its name from its soil (weathered from the weak underlying limestone), which is black in colour, almost destitute of sand and loam, and rich in limestone and marl formations, especially adapted to the production of cotton; hence the region is also called the Cotton Belt. Between the Cotton Belt and the Tennessee Valley is the mineral region, the Old Land area—a region of resistant rocks—whose soils, also derived from weathering in silu, are of varied fertility, the best coming from the granites, sandstones and limestones, the poorest from the gneisses, schists and slates. North of the mineral region is the Cereal Belt, embracing the Tennessee Valley and the counties beyond, whose richest soils are the red clays and dark loams of the river valley; north of which are less fertile soils, produced by siliceous and sandstone formations.

== Wetumpka Meteor Crater ==
Wetumpka is the home of "Alabama's greatest natural disaster." A 1,000-foot (300 m)-wide meteorite hit the area about 80 million years ago. The hills just east of downtown showcase the eroded remains of the five-mile (8.0 km) wide impact crater that was blasted into the bedrock, with the area labeled the Wetumpka crater or astrobleme ("star-wound") for the concentric rings of fractures and zones of shattered rock can be found beneath the surface. In 2002, Christian Koeberl with the Institute of Geochemistry University of Vienna published evidence and established the site as an internationally recognized impact crater.

== Public lands ==
Alabama includes several types of public use lands. These include four national forests and one national preserve within state borders that provide over 25% of the state's public recreation land.

- land regions
- Alabama State Parks
- Alabama Public Fishing Lakes
- Alabama Wildlife Management Areas
- Little River Canyon National Preserve
- Russell Cave National Monument
- National Forests
  - Conecuh National Forest
  - Talladega National Forest
  - Tuskegee National Forest
  - William B. Bankhead National Forest
- Wilderness Areas
  - Cheaha Wilderness
  - Dugger Mountain Wilderness
  - Sipsey Wilderness
- National Recreation Trail
  - Pinhoti National Recreation Trail
- National Wildlife Refuge
  - Bon Secour National Wildlife Refuge
  - Cahaba River National Wildlife Refuge
  - Choctaw National Wildlife Refuge
  - Eufaula National Wildlife Refuge
  - Fern Cave National Wildlife Refuge
  - Key Cave National Wildlife Refuge
  - Mountain Longleaf National Wildlife Refuge
  - Sauta Cave National Wildlife Refuge
  - Watercress Darter National Wildlife Refuge
  - Wheeler National Wildlife Refuge

== See also ==
- Alabama
- Geography of the United States
