= List of mountains in Alabama =

This is a list of mountains in the U.S. state of Alabama. This list is compiled from all of the GNIS features in Alabama that are classified as a cliff, ridge, or summit, and are over 1,500 feet (457 m) in elevation.

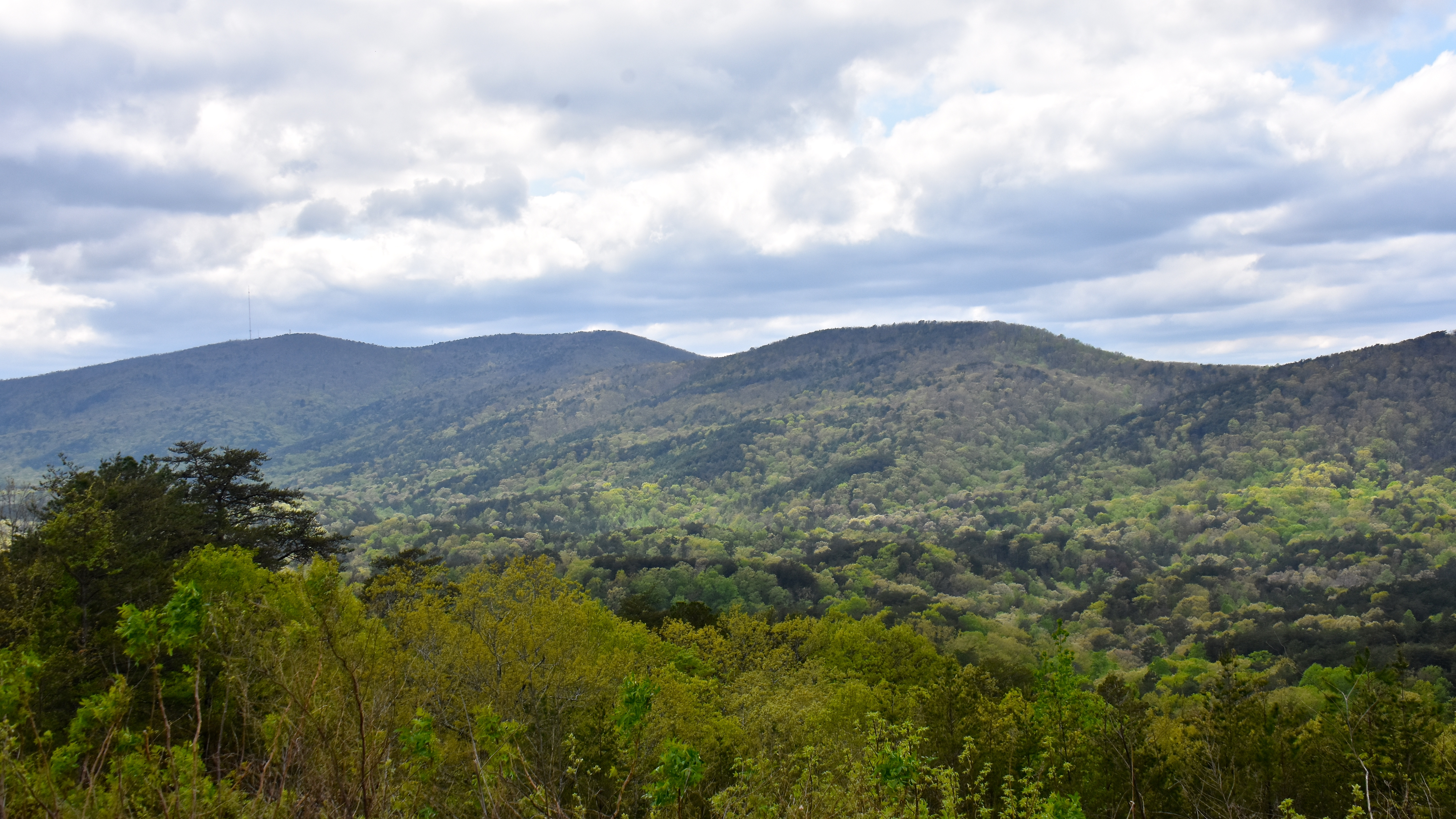
Cheaha Mountain, the highest point in Alabama

View of Huntsville from atop Monte Sano Mountain

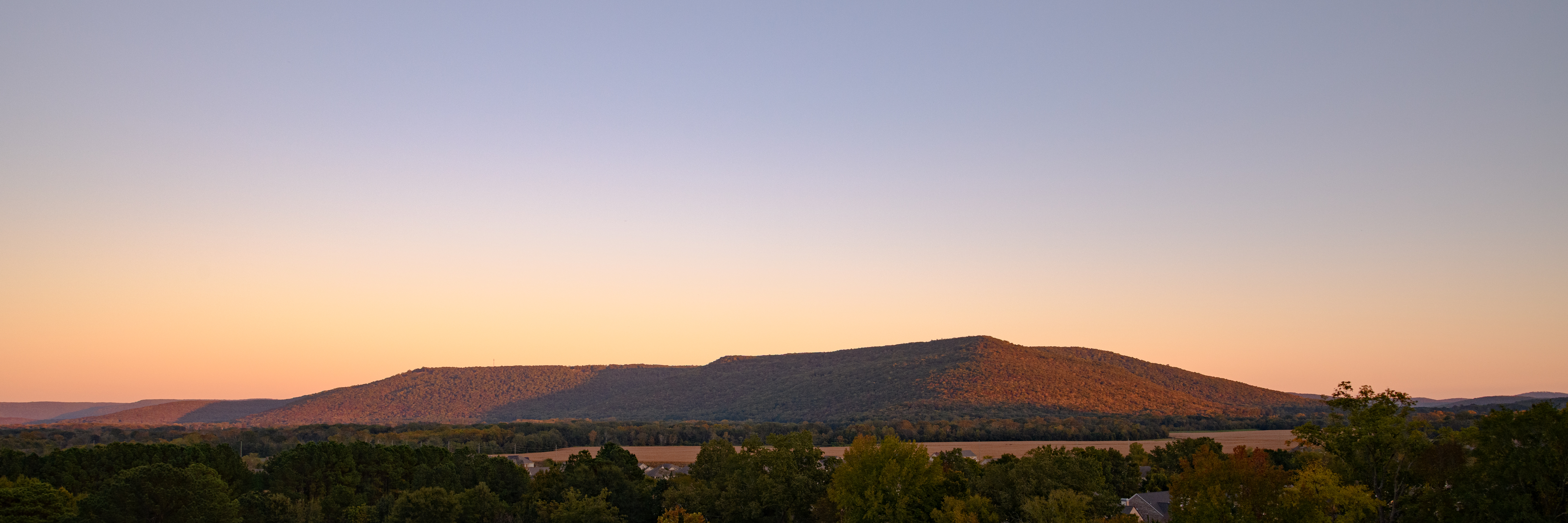
The northwest side of Keel Mountain

== List of peaks above 1,500 feet ==
Name (GNIS)	County	Elevation	Coordinates
Cheaha Mountain	Cleburne	2,405 ft (733 m)	33°29′07″N 85°48′31″W
Hernandez Peak	Clay	2,336 ft (712 m)	33°27′30″N 85°48′45″W
Odum Point	Clay	2,323 ft (708 m)	33°24′59″N 85°49′53″W
Bald Rock	Cleburne	2,316 ft (706 m)	33°29′43″N 85°48′28″W
Parker High Point	Clay	2,224 ft (678 m)	33°24′56″N 85°49′26″W
McDill Point	Clay	2,175 ft (663 m)	33°27′13″N 85°49′15″W
Big Caney Head	Clay	2,169 ft (661 m)	33°24′49″N 85°49′58″W
Dugger Mountain	Cleburne	2,130 ft (650 m)	33°52′57″N 85°35′14″W
Cedar Mountain	Clay	2,113 ft (644 m)	33°24′20″N 85°50′14″W
Choccolocco Mountain	Calhoun	2,080 ft (634 m)	33°41′36″N 85°44′19″W
Morton Hill	Calhoun	2,080 ft (634 m)	33°41′36″N 85°44′19″W
Big Oak Mountain	Calhoun	2,047 ft (624 m)	33°44′16″N 85°43′50″W
Moorman Hill	Calhoun	2,037 ft (621 m)	33°43′46″N 85°44′08″W
Fox Mountain	DeKalb	1,972 ft (601 m)	34°43′45″N 85°34′13″W
King Hill	Calhoun	1,972 ft (601 m)	33°39′58″N 85°45′55″W
Blue Mountain	Cleburne	1,965 ft (599 m)	33°30′19″N 85°47′28″W
Flagpole Mountain	Cherokee	1,962 ft (598 m)	34°01′50″N 85°25′31″W
Pulpit Rock	Cleburne	1,952 ft (595 m)	33°28′57″N 85°49′09″W
Oakey Mountain	Cleburne	1,942 ft (592 m)	33°52′49″N 85°30′54″W
Horn Mountain	Talladega	1,923 ft (586 m)	33°17′52″N 86°04′29″W
Silver Ridge	Calhoun	1,923 ft (586 m)	33°39′56″N 85°45′51″W
Stanley Hill	Calhoun	1,909 ft (582 m)	33°40′26″N 85°44′38″W
Fox Mountain	Dade	1,906 ft (581 m)	34°44′44″N 85°33′35″W
Little Caney Head	Clay	1,906 ft (581 m)	33°25′24″N 85°49′18″W
Weisner Mountain	Cherokee	1,883 ft (574 m)	34°01′35″N 85°40′28″W
Augusta Mine Ridge	Cleburne	1,870 ft (570 m)	33°56′18″N 85°30′10″W
Hurricane Mountain	Calhoun	1,870 ft (570 m)	33°52′15″N 85°40′30″W
Burgess Point	Clay	1,867 ft (569 m)	33°22′51″N 85°54′24″W
Johnson Top	Jackson	1,860 ft (567 m)	34°58′32″N 86°18′46″W
Little Mountain	DeKalb	1,840 ft (560 m)	34°32′22″N 85°36′43″W
Husky Top	Jackson	1,827 ft (557 m)	34°57′54″N 86°16′35″W
Mokeley Hill	Calhoun	1,824 ft (556 m)	33°44′07″N 85°43′01″W
Little Cumberland Mountain	Jackson	1,818 ft (554 m)	34°59′08″N 86°06′52″W
Frederick Hill	Calhoun	1,811 ft (552 m)	33°43′11″N 85°44′14″W
High Top	Madison	1,811 ft (552 m)	34°56′30″N 86°20′07″W
Pea Ridge	DeKalb	1,800 ft (550 m)	34°36′59″N 85°40′46″W
Skeleton Mountains	Calhoun	1,795 ft (547 m)	33°40′33″N 85°46′14″W
Wikoff Hill	Calhoun	1,795 ft (547 m)	33°42′01″N 85°44′39″W
Wilson Top	Jackson	1,795 ft (547 m)	34°59′22″N 86°12′10″W
Hodge Mountain	Madison	1,785 ft (544 m)	34°56′48″N 86°16′00″W
Maxwell Mountain	Madison	1,785 ft (544 m)	34°55′33″N 86°16′24″W
Bice Mountain	Madison	1,781 ft (543 m)	34°52′03″N 86°20′45″W
Hogyard Ridge	Jackson	1,770 ft (540 m)	34°58′13″N 86°12′16″W
Bear Den Point	Jackson	1,768 ft (539 m)	34°58′19″N 86°03′56″W
Buffalo Point	Jackson	1,768 ft (539 m)	34°58′46″N 86°02′39″W
Miller Mountain	Jackson	1,765 ft (538 m)	34°56′57″N 86°11′25″W
Letson Point	Jackson	1,762 ft (537 m)	34°55′48″N 86°03′23″W
Doctor Knob	Jackson	1,759 ft (536 m)	34°56′25″N 86°07′31″W
Little Coon Mountain	Jackson	1,759 ft (536 m)	34°56′29″N 86°01′03″W
Sisk Point	Jackson	1,759 ft (536 m)	34°57′08″N 86°08′34″W
Larkin Mountain	Jackson	1,755 ft (535 m)	34°55′45″N 86°12′06″W
Putman Mountain	Madison	1,752 ft (534 m)	34°56′11″N 86°19′38″W
Warren Peak	Jackson	1,749 ft (533 m)	34°57′54″N 85°53′59″W
Middle Point	Jackson	1,729 ft (527 m)	34°54′18″N 86°04′32″W
Round Knob	Jackson	1,729 ft (527 m)	34°51′21″N 86°05′57″W
Davis Hill	Calhoun	1,726 ft (526 m)	33°39′38″N 85°46′41″W
Bingham Mountain	Jackson	1,722 ft (525 m)	34°49′58″N 86°19′51″W
Turkey Heaven Mountain	Cleburne	1,722 ft (525 m)	33°32′51″N 85°27′59″W
Cagle Point	Madison	1,719 ft (524 m)	34°52′37″N 86°21′41″W
Oak Hill	Cleburne	1,719 ft (524 m)	33°30′12″N 85°48′08″W
Sharp Mountain	Madison	1,719 ft (524 m)	34°49′05″N 86°20′55″W
Brewer Mountain	Jackson	1,716 ft (523 m)	34°54′29″N 86°11′38″W
Potato Knob	Madison	1,716 ft (523 m)	34°50′51″N 86°22′40″W
High Rock Point	Jackson	1,713 ft (522 m)	34°58′38″N 86°02′24″W
Jacobs Mountain	Jackson	1,713 ft (522 m)	34°49′31″N 86°11′27″W
Backbone Ridge	Jackson	1,709 ft (521 m)	34°56′50″N 86°12′31″W
Chimney Peak	Calhoun	1,709 ft (521 m)	33°50′14″N 85°43′58″W
Oak Mountain	Calhoun	1,703 ft (519 m)	33°37′15″N 85°52′18″W
The Knob	Jackson	1,703 ft (519 m)	34°57′01″N 86°10′09″W
Robinson Mountain	Clay	1,699 ft (518 m)	33°23′57″N 85°50′11″W
Crow Mountain	Jackson	1,696 ft (517 m)	34°51′50″N 86°01′18″W
Summers Top	Jackson	1,696 ft (517 m)	34°57′04″N 85°58′18″W
Coldwater Mountain	Calhoun	1,693 ft (516 m)	33°37′39″N 85°53′25″W
Coldwater Peak	Calhoun	1,693 ft (516 m)	33°37′39″N 85°53′25″W
Russell Point	Jackson	1,690 ft (515 m)	34°58′31″N 85°49′13″W
Evans Ridge	Jackson	1,686 ft (514 m)	34°54′18″N 86°00′53″W
Montague Mountain	Jackson	1,683 ft (513 m)	34°58′31″N 85°49′14″W
Rattlesnake Mountain	Cleburne	1,680 ft (512 m)	33°45′21″N 85°37′21″W
Wilkinson Mountain	Cleburne	1,677 ft (511 m)	33°45′21″N 85°37′21″W
Brooks Mountain	Jackson	1,670 ft (510 m)	34°49′47″N 86°15′21″W
Mount Brandon	DeKalb	1,670 ft (510 m)	34°23′07″N 85°45′13″W
Fork Mountain	Jackson	1,670 ft (509 m)	34°48′39″N 86°08′57″W
Deer Lick Bluff	Jackson	1,667 ft (508 m)	34°57′48″N 86°11′22″W
Logan Point	Jackson	1,667 ft (508 m)	34°50′35″N 86°12′02″W
High Point	Jackson	1,660 ft (506 m)	34°55′42″N 85°59′06″W
Maxwell Mountain	Jackson	1,657 ft (505 m)	34°52′40″N 86°13′40″W
The Pinnacle	Talladega	1,657 ft (505 m)	33°19′10″N 86°02′06″W
Bogan Peak	Cherokee	1,654 ft (504 m)	34°16′10″N 85°29′55″W
Monte Sano Mountain	Madison	1,654 ft (504 m)	34°44′29″N 86°30′28″W
The Buzzard Roost	Jackson	1,644 ft (501 m)	34°49′56″N 86°04′20″W
Devils Saltcellar Ridge	DeKalb	1,634 ft (498 m)	34°22′26″N 85°45′38″W
Porter Bluff	Jackson	1,634 ft (498 m)	34°57′33″N 85°38′53″W
Bucklight Point	Jackson	1,631 ft (497 m)	34°46′21″N 86°20′32″W
Horseshoe Bend	Jackson	1,627 ft (496 m)	34°50′36″N 86°07′55″W
Rock Quarry Mountain	Cherokee	1,627 ft (496 m)	33°58′02″N 85°29′51″W
Threwer Point	Jackson	1,627 ft (496 m)	34°47′18″N 86°13′39″W
Nat Mountain	Jackson	1,624 ft (495 m)	34°42′00″N 86°14′55″W
Sampson Point	Jackson	1,624 ft (495 m)	34°49′43″N 86°12′47″W
Shinbone Ridge	Clay	1,624 ft (495 m)	33°24′15″N 85°46′16″W
Tater Hill Mountain	Clay	1,624 ft (495 m)	33°24′15″N 85°46′16″W
Big Bend	Jackson	1,621 ft (494 m)	34°49′40″N 86°08′41″W
Johns Mountain	Cleburne	1,614 ft (492 m)	33°31′11″N 85°27′38″W
Shiny Rock	Jackson	1,614 ft (492 m)	34°59′09″N 85°55′14″W
Steele Point	Jackson	1,614 ft (492 m)	34°57′28″N 85°56′31″W
Eagle Cliff	DeKalb	1,611 ft (491 m)	34°39′01″N 85°33′13″W
Bee Hill	Cleburne	1,610 ft (490 m)	33°31′43″N 85°27′49″W
Blessington Point	Jackson	1,604 ft (489 m)	34°45′55″N 86°08′27″W
Castle Rock	DeKalb	1,604 ft (489 m)	34°26′11″N 85°42′15″W
Rutledge Point	Jackson	1,604 ft (489 m)	34°48′21″N 86°12′33″W
Wolf Ridge	Cherokee	1,604 ft (489 m)	33°57′05″N 85°30′24″W
Reeves Hill	Calhoun	1,601 ft (488 m)	33°42′01″N 85°44′54″W
Chestnut Knob	Madison	1,594 ft (486 m)	34°43′27″N 86°28′44″W
Keel Mountain	Madison	1,588 ft (484 m)	34°38′40″N 86°21′49″W
Logan Point	Madison	1,588 ft (484 m)	34°45′12″N 86°30′28″W
Step Point	Jackson	1,588 ft (484 m)	34°59′09″N 86°01′24″W
Round Top Mountain	Madison	1,585 ft (483 m)	34°43′02″N 86°32′21″W
Summerhouse Mountain	Jackson	1,585 ft (483 m)	34°57′44″N 85°46′27″W
Wooten Hill	DeKalb	1,585 ft (483 m)	34°21′30″N 85°46′18″W
McCrary Point	Jackson	1,581 ft (482 m)	34°53′22″N 86°01′57″W
Peter Gold Point	Jackson	1,581 ft (482 m)	34°46′31″N 86°07′05″W
Wilson Ridge	Cleburne	1,581 ft (482 m)	33°55′26″N 85°30′25″W
Bald Rock Mountain	St. Clair	1,578 ft (481 m)	33°36′14″N 86°25′18″W
Skillet Handle	Jackson	1,578 ft (481 m)	34°54′31″N 86°14′30″W
Thompson Hill	DeKalb	1,578 ft (481 m)	34°20′37″N 85°47′00″W
Trenton Point	Jackson	1,578 ft (481 m)	34°45′36″N 86°15′30″W
Ben White Point	Calhoun	1,570 ft (480 m)	33°46′47″N 85°42′39″W
Big Tank Ridge	Cleburne	1,570 ft (480 m)	33°54′55″N 85°31′36″W
Noyes Hill	Calhoun	1,570 ft (480 m)	33°44′05″N 85°44′36″W
Piney Point	Jackson	1,568 ft (478 m)	34°52′13″N 86°02′21″W
Sherman Cliffs	Clay	1,565 ft (477 m)	33°16′15″N 86°05′12″W
Signal Mountain	Shelby	1,565 ft (477 m)	33°23′51″N 86°34′52″W
Hale Mountain	Madison	1,558 ft (475 m)	34°59′17″N 86°21′12″W
Huntsville Mountain	Madison	1,555 ft (474 m)	34°40′17″N 86°31′01″W
Sand Steps	Jackson	1,555 ft (474 m)	34°56′58″N 85°50′17″W
Austin Point	Jackson	1,552 ft (473 m)	34°55′25″N 85°50′41″W
Big Mountain	Etowah	1,549 ft (472 m)	34°08′23″N 85°52′10″W
Backbone Mountain	Madison	1,545 ft (471 m)	34°55′00″N 86°22′22″W
Flagpole Mountain	Talladega	1,545 ft (471 m)	33°24′42″N 86°12′27″W
Sleeping Giant	Talladega	1,545 ft (471 m)	33°24′42″N 86°12′27″W
Winding Stairs	Jackson	1,545 ft (471 m)	34°49′17″N 86°12′08″W
Blount Mountain	Blount	1,540 ft (470 m)	33°55′56″N 86°19′20″W
Sand Bluff	Jackson	1,535 ft (468 m)	34°51′42″N 86°10′37″W
Mount Royal	Calhoun	1,529 ft (466 m)	33°39′48″N 85°47′28″W
Round Knob	Jackson	1,529 ft (466 m)	34°48′53″N 86°13′42″W
Sand Mountain	Shelby	1,529 ft (466 m)	33°25′21″N 86°32′50″W
Sand Point	Madison	1,529 ft (466 m)	34°42′07″N 86°31′33″W
Gizzard Point	Jackson	1,526 ft (465 m)	34°47′02″N 86°06′16″W
Indian Mountain	Cherokee	1,519 ft (463 m)	34°01′21″N 85°27′21″W
Jasper Point	Madison	1,519 ft (463 m)	34°46′21″N 86°23′06″W
Bishop Point	Jackson	1,516 ft (462 m)	34°54′23″N 86°07′00″W
London Mountain	Clay	1,516 ft (462 m)	33°18′38″N 85°57′27″W
Rebecca Mountain	Clay	1,516 ft (462 m)	33°09′27″N 86°09′02″W
Red Mountain	Calhoun	1,512 ft (461 m)	33°50′27″N 85°37′32″W
Cahaba Mountain	St. Clair	1,510 ft (460 m)	33°44′42″N 86°31′39″W
McCoy Mountain	Jackson	1,510 ft (460 m)	34°39′35″N 86°12′35″W

== See also ==
- Geography of Alabama
