= Cheaha State Park =

State park in Alabama, United States

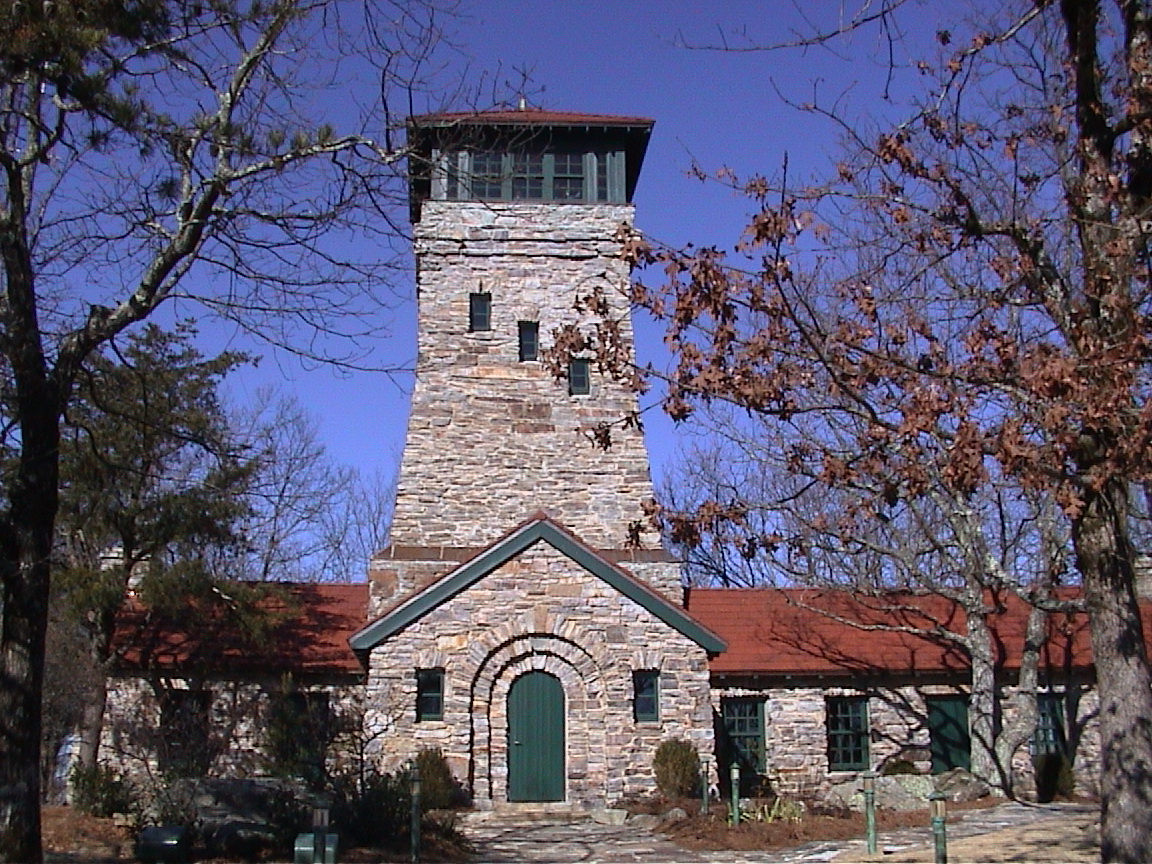
- Bunker Tower

- Location within Alabama
- Interactive map of Cheaha State Park
- Location: Clay County and Cleburne County, Alabama, United States
- Coordinates: 33°29′07″N 85°48′30″W
- Area: 2,799 acres (1,133 ha)
- Elevation: 2,405 ft (733 m)
- Established: 1933
- Administrator: Alabama Department of Conservation and Natural Resources
- Website: Official website

Cheaha State Park is a public recreation area located in Clay and Cleburne counties in Alabama, US. The park's 2,799 acres (1,133 ha) include Cheaha Mountain, the highest point in the state. The park adjoins Talladega National Forest and is managed by the Alabama Department of Conservation and Natural Resources. It is Alabama's oldest continuously operating state park. Facilities include lodgings, a restaurant, campsites, and hiking trails.

== History ==
The park opened to the public in 1933. From 1933 to 1939, the Civilian Conservation Corps was active in the park creating Cheaha Lake and building numerous structures including a stone bathhouse, eleven stone cabins, two stone pavilions, Bunker Tower, the Bald Rock Group Lodge, and several hiking trails. A hotel, restaurant, and five chalets were added to the park in 1973.

On January 4, 1944, a P-38 Lightning warplane, piloted by 2nd Lieutenant Chester R. Gunkel of Milwaukee, Wisconsin, was flying from Love Field, Dallas, Texas, to Atlanta, Georgia, and crashed into Bald Rock. A machine gun was recovered from the crash site and was subsequently donated to the park museum in 2023.

In 2020, the park's Doug Ghee Accessible Trail was named a National Recreation Trail.

== Awards ==
In September 2020, Cheaha State Park was one of eleven Alabama State Parks awarded Tripadvisor's Traveler's Choice Award, which recognizes businesses and attractions that earn consistently high user reviews.

== Activities and amenities ==
- Day-use: The park has day-use areas for picnicking, swimming, and fishing.
- Scenic overlooks: Cheaha Mountain is topped with Bunker Tower, a stone building with an observation deck on top. A wheelchair-accessible wooden walkway on the Bald Rock Trail provides another overlook of the surrounding region.
- Hiking: The park features the Cheaha Trailhead of the Pinhoti Trail system which weaves through the Talladega National Forest and connects to the Appalachian Trail.
- Overnight stays: The park has 73 modern campsites and a smaller number of semi-primitive campsites. Accommodations also include a 30-room hotel, chalets, and cabins. The Bald Rock Group Lodge is used for conferences and weddings.

== See also ==
- Cheaha Wilderness
