= Cheaha Wilderness =

Wilderness area in Alabama, United States

- IUCN category Ib (wilderness area)
- Location within the United States
- Location: Clay County, Alabama, USA
- Nearest city: Anniston, Alabama
- Coordinates: 33°25′08″N 85°49′38″W
- Area: 7,245 acres (29.32 km^{2})
- Established: 3 January 1983
- Governing body: U.S. Forest Service

The 7,245-acre (2,932 ha) Cheaha Wilderness lies next to Cheaha State Park, near the Talladega Mountains in Alabama, United States. It lies within the Talladega National Forest and is administrated by the US Forest Service. Congress designated the area on January 3, 1983 and expanded it in 1988.

From the stone tower on the summit of Cheaha Mountain, Alabama's highest point at 2,407 feet (734 m), a dense second-growth woodland stretches south across Cheaha State Park and into Cheaha Wilderness.

Best known for its elevated terrain and overlooks with panoramic views, the Cheaha Wilderness attracts hikers to its section of the Pinhoti Trail This stretch of the trail runs from northeast to southwest across the entire Wilderness, a distance of about 10 miles (16 km). Primarily following a ridge system through Talladega National Forest, the Pinhoti crosses the top of Cheaha Mountain.

In total, the 100-mile (160 km) long Pinhoti Trail passes through both the Cheaha and Dugger Mountain Wilderness areas, and connects with the Appalachian Trail in Georgia.
