= State park =

Protected area managed at the federated state level

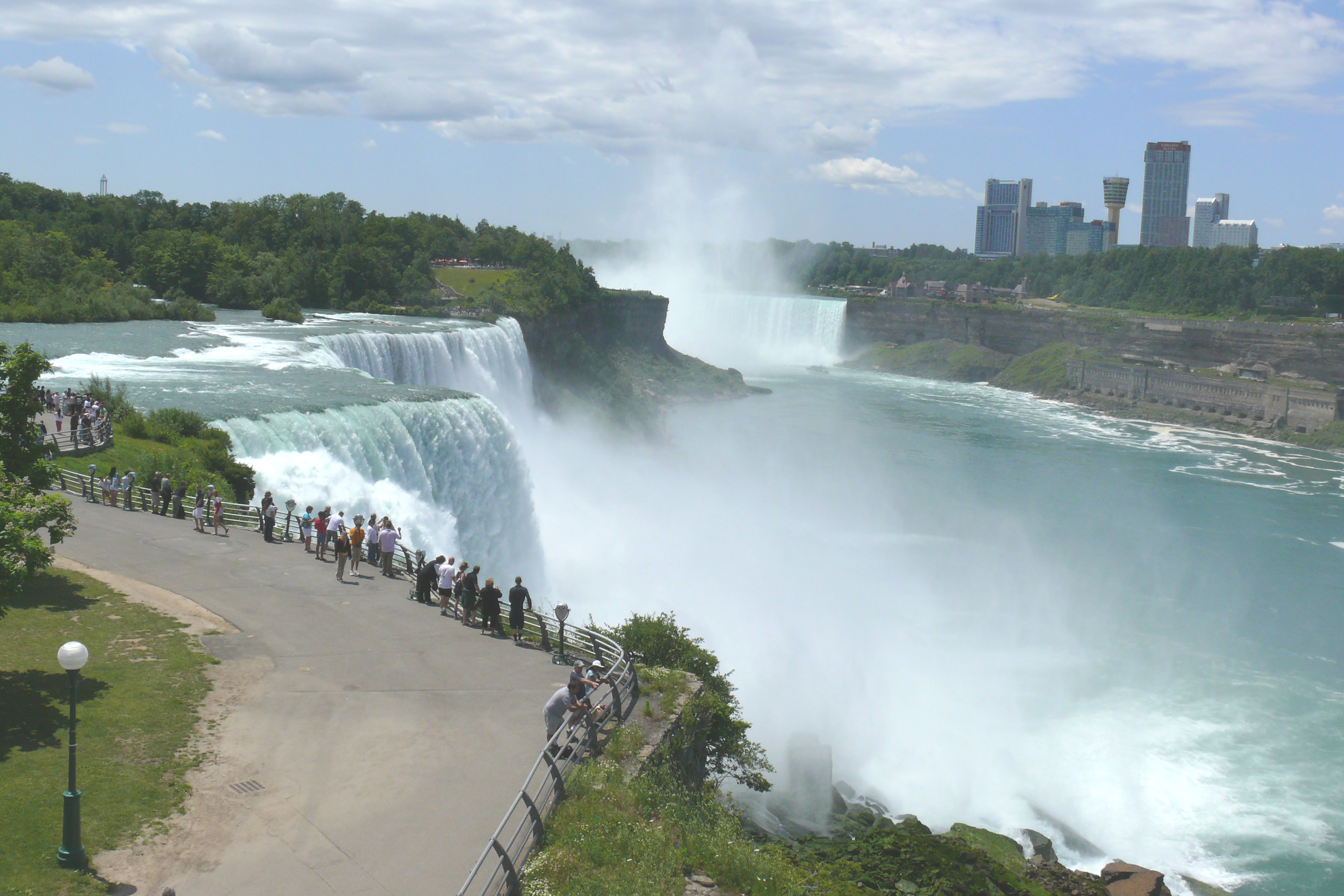
Niagara Falls State Park, New York, United States

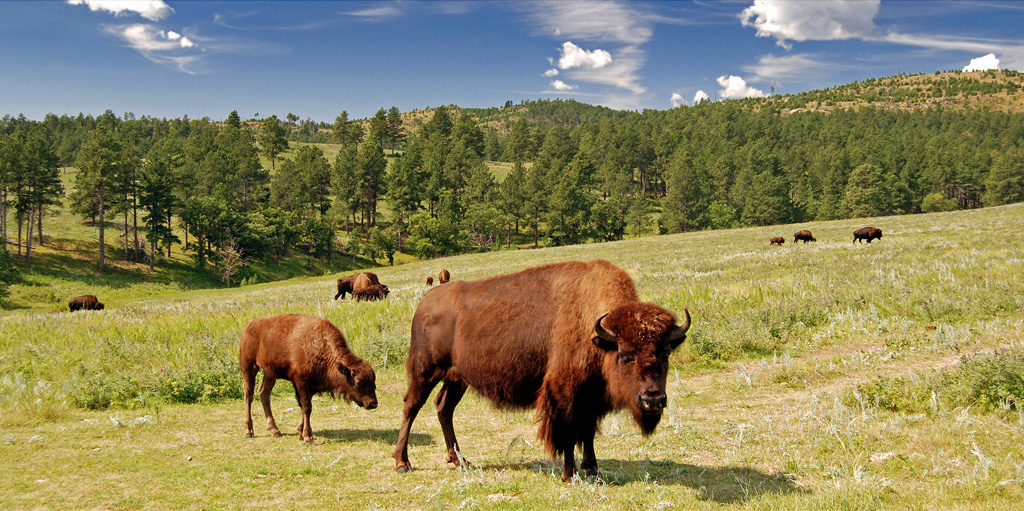
American bison in Custer State Park, South Dakota, United States

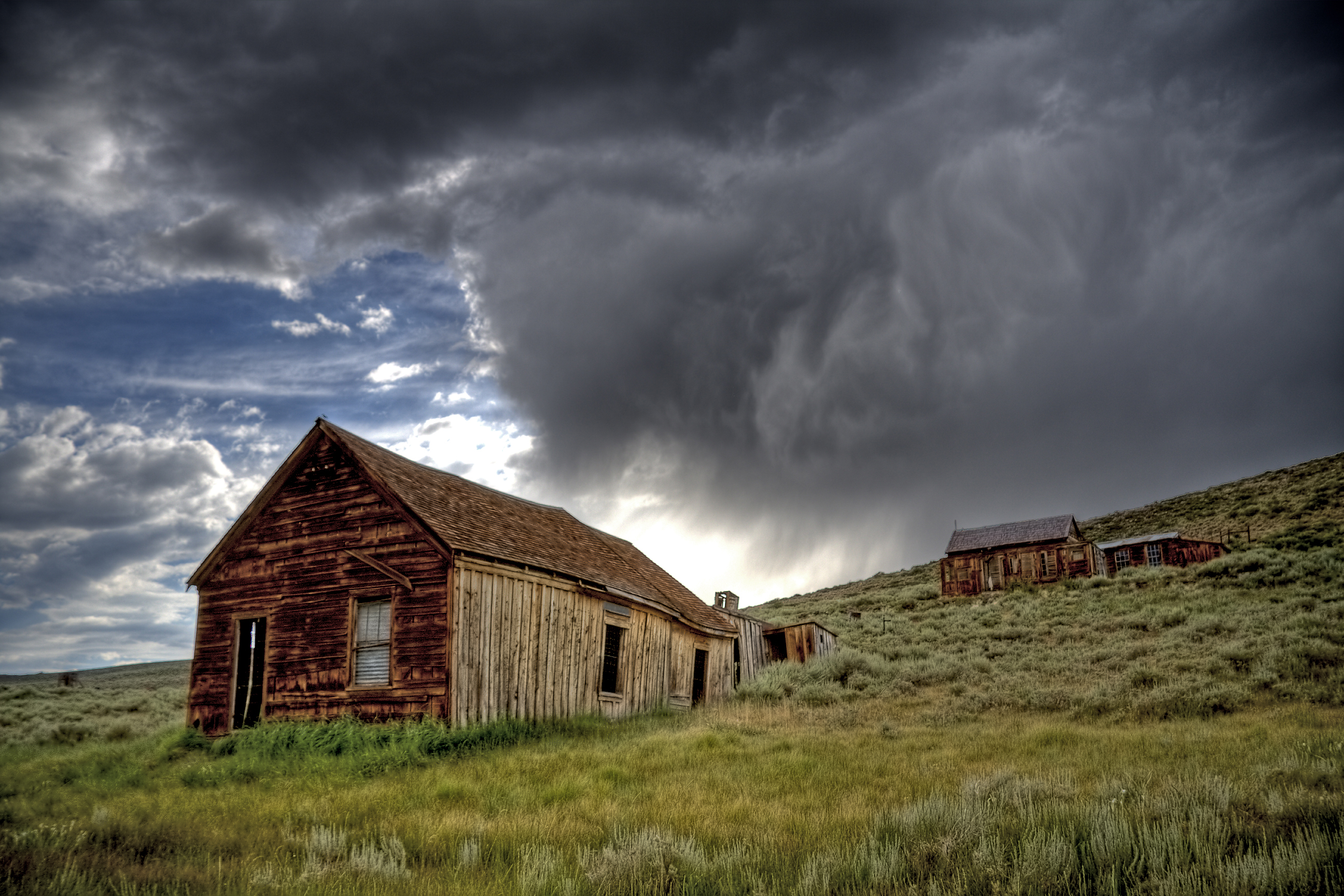
Bodie State Historical Park, California, United States

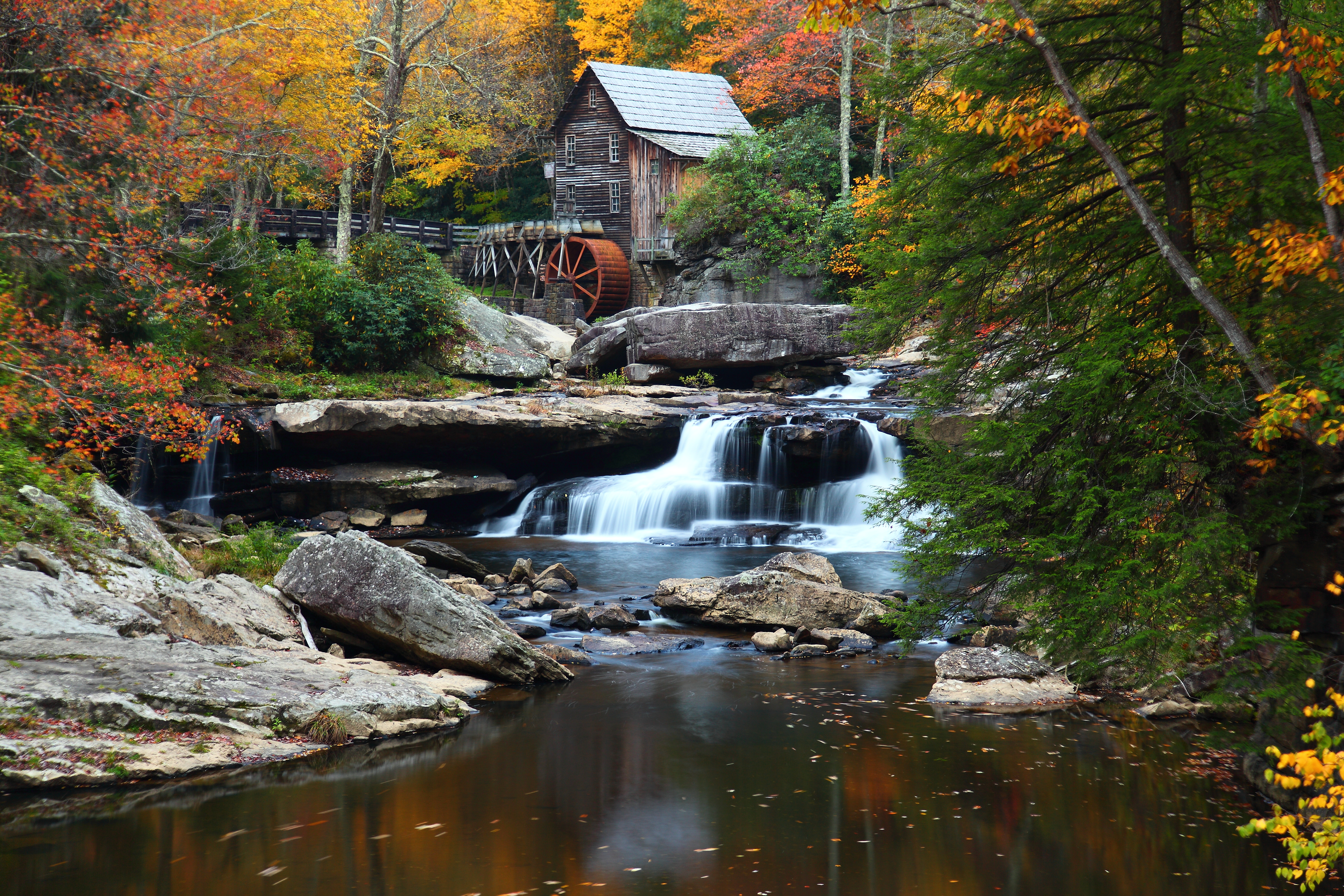
Babcock State Park, West Virginia, United States

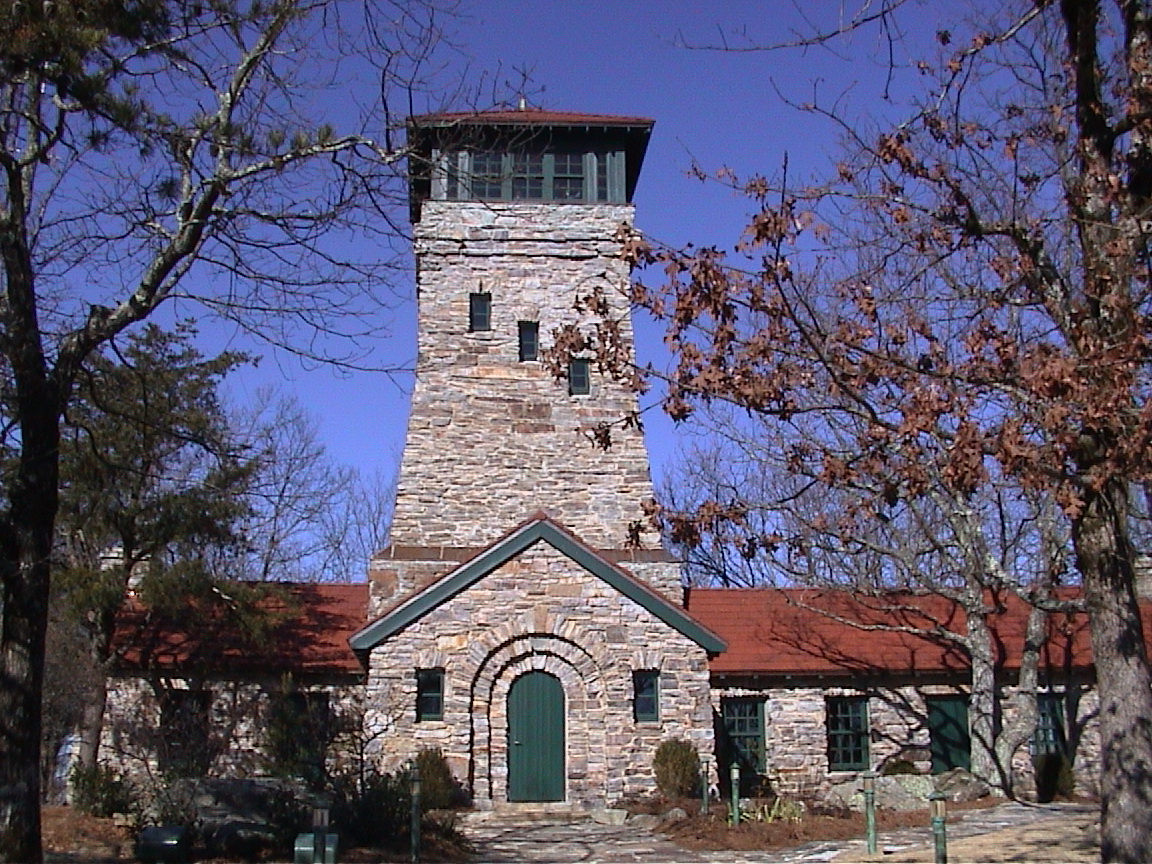
An example of New Deal developments in U.S. state parks: Bunker Tower, Cheaha State Park, Alabama, United States

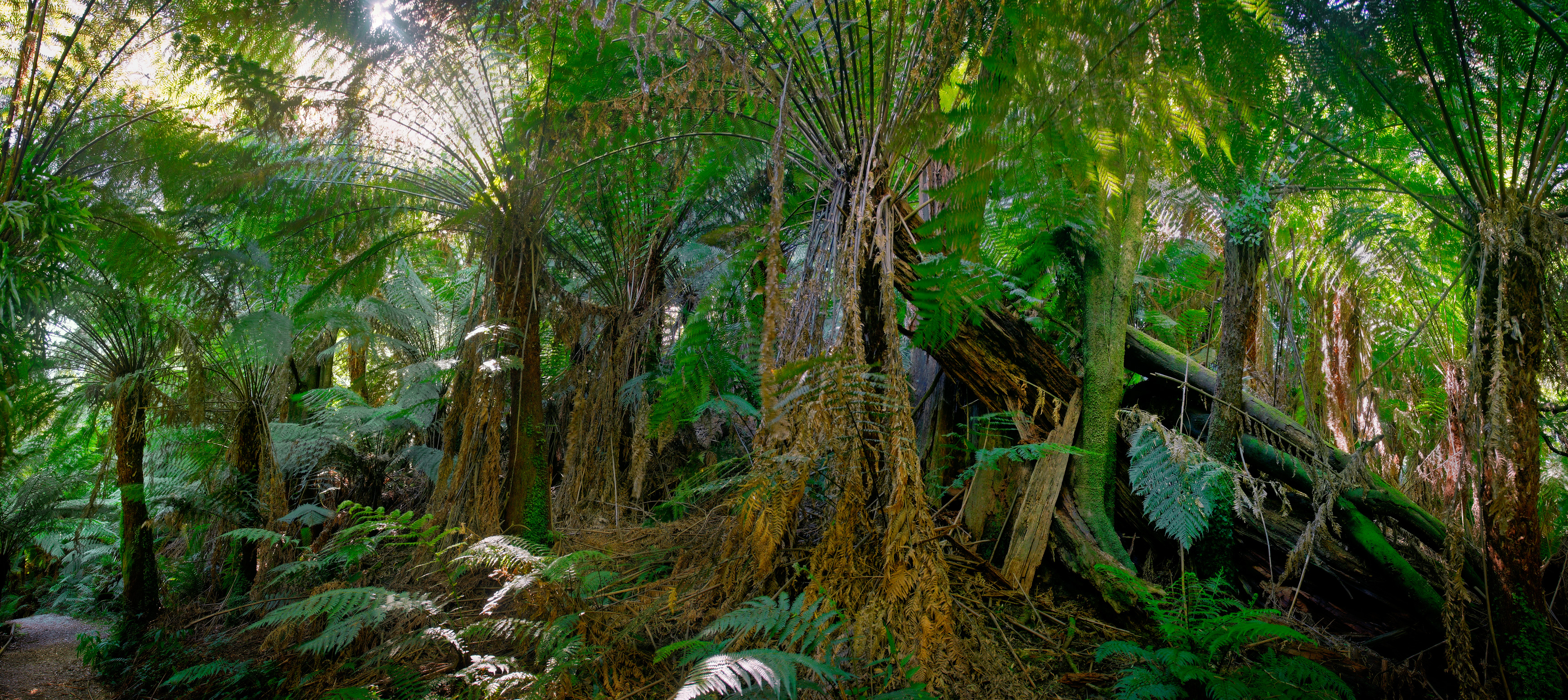
Mount Worth State Park. Victoria, Australia

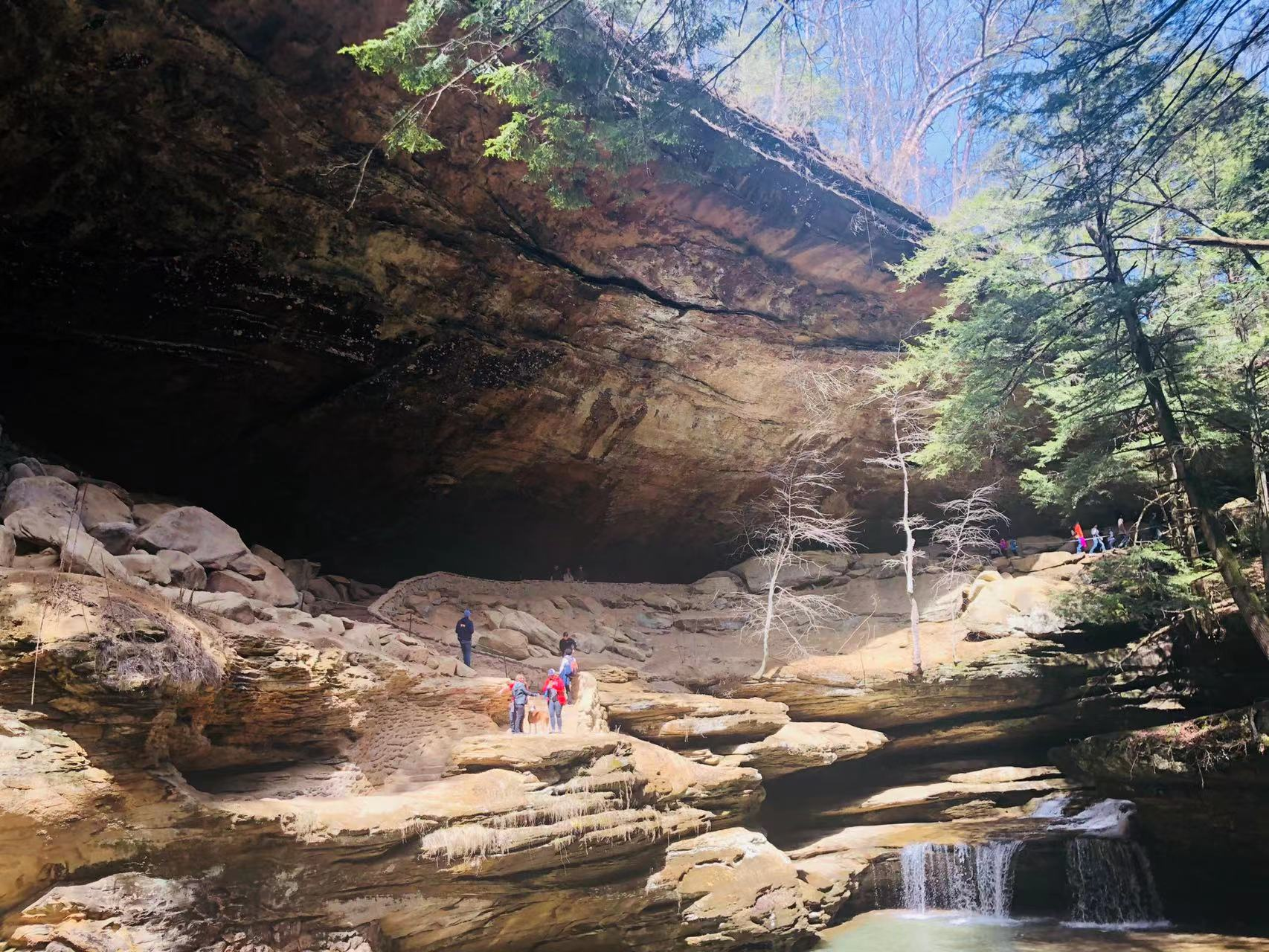
Old Man's Cave in Hocking Hills State Park, Ohio, United States

State parks are parks or other protected areas managed at the sub-national level within those nations which use "state" as a political subdivision. State parks are typically established by a state to preserve a location on account of its natural beauty, historic interest, or recreational potential. There are state parks under the administration of the government of each U.S. state, some of the Mexican states, and in Brazil. The term is also used in the Australian states of Victoria and New South Wales. The equivalent term used in Canada, Argentina, South Africa, and Belgium, is provincial park. Similar systems of local government maintained parks exist in other countries, but the terminology varies.

State parks are thus similar to national parks, but under state rather than federal administration. Similarly, local government entities below state level may maintain parks, e.g., regional parks or county parks. In general, state parks are smaller than national parks, with a few exceptions such as Anza-Borrego Desert State Park in California, Wood-Tikchik State Park in Alaska, or Adirondack State Park in New York, the largest state park in the United States.

In addition to preserving natural landscapes and providing recreational opportunities, many state parks also serve as important educational resources. They often offer guided tours, interpretive programs, and exhibits that help visitors learn about the local flora, fauna, geology, and cultural history of the area. These programs are designed not only to enhance the visitor experience but also to promote conservation awareness and encourage responsible enjoyment of natural resources.

== State parks by country ==
=== United States ===
There are 6,792 state park units in the United States, according to the National Association of State Park Directors (NASPD). There are some 813 million annual visits to the country's state parks. The NASPD further counts over 43,000 miles (69,000 km) of trail, 217,367 campsites, and 8,277 cabins and lodges across U.S. state parks. The largest state park system in the United States is Alaska State Parks, with over 100 sites encompassing 3.3 million acres.

Many states include designations beyond "state park" in their state parks systems. Other designations might be state recreation areas, state beaches, and state nature reserves. Some state park systems include long-distance trails and historic sites. To encourage tourism in rural areas, several states have simple lodges, inns, hotels, or motels (usually with a restaurant) for lodging at some parks. These typically use "Resort" in the name, such as "_____ Resort State Park" in West Virginia state parks and "_____ State Resort Park" in neighboring Kentucky state parks, which has 17 such resort parks, the most of any state. Other states use the Resort name inconsistently (like DeGray Lake Resort State Park, the only one out of three resorts in Arkansas state parks), or have only one such park (South Carolina state parks' Hickory Knob State Resort Park), or do not use the designation at all (such as the lodges of Georgia state parks). The term "lodge" may also refer to a hiking lodge, essentially a large cabin for hikers rather than a large facility with private rooms and a restaurant. Other lodging may include yurts and tipis.

Some parks are called "State Natural Areas", for example in the Wisconsin State Natural Areas program.

Not all parks owned by a state are necessarily part of its state-park system, such as Stone Mountain Park near Atlanta. Some Texas state parks are a land lease from the U.S. government, while Mackinac National Park was handed down to become the first of the Michigan state parks. As with national parks, facilities at state parks are often leased to concessionaires to operate. Breaks Interstate Park is operated under an interstate compact by Virginia state parks, although it is also one of the Kentucky state parks, straddling both sides of the state line. Other multi-state parks are legally two separate parks with the same name and more informal cooperation between them.

==== History ====
The title of oldest state park in the United States is claimed by Niagara Falls State Park in New York, established in 1885. Several public parks previously or currently maintained at the state level pre-date it. Indian Springs State Park has been operated continuously by the state of Georgia as a public park since 1825, although it did not gain the title "State Park" until 1931. In 1864 Yosemite Valley and Mariposa Grove were ceded by the federal government to California until Yosemite National Park was proclaimed in 1890. In 1878 Wisconsin set aside a vast swath of its northern forests as "The State Park" but, needing money, sold most of it to lumber companies within 20 years. Mackinac National Park was established in 1875 as the second U.S. national park before being converted to a state park in 1895. The first state park with the designation of "state park" was Itasca State Park in Minnesota, established in 1891.

Many state park systems date to the 1930s, when around 800 state parks (and several national ones) across the country were developed with assistance from federal job-creation programs like the Civilian Conservation Corps and Works Progress Administration.

On February 24, 2025, Google said that it would change all parks labelled "state parks" in Canada to "provincial parks" on Google Maps. This issue predated the Trump administration but gained attention after Trump stated that he would like Canada to become the 51st state.

== See also ==
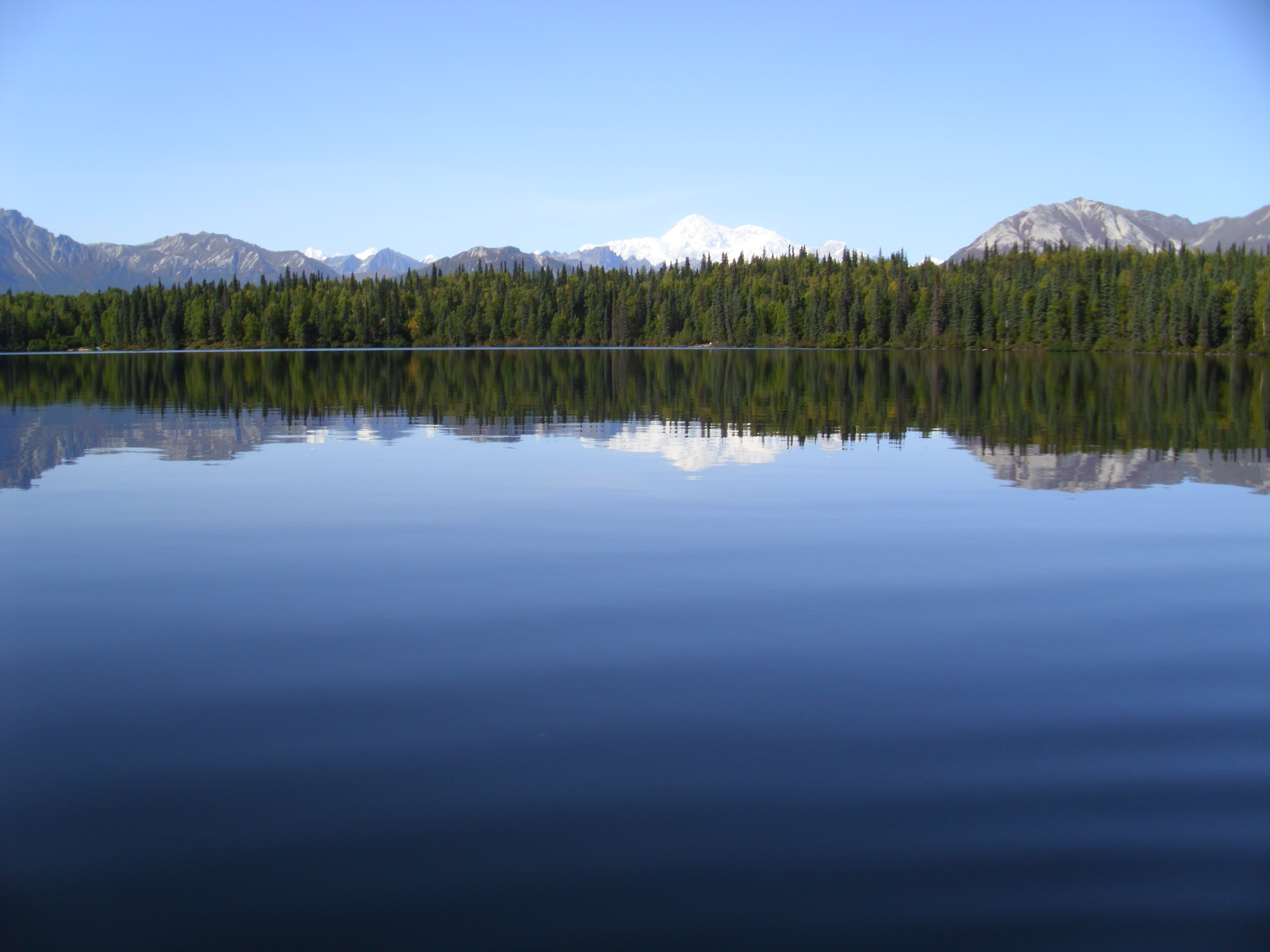
Denali State Park, Alaska

- Lists of state parks by U.S. state
- National Wilderness Preservation System (United States)
- State forest
- Regional park
- Open space reserve
