= Bunker Tower =

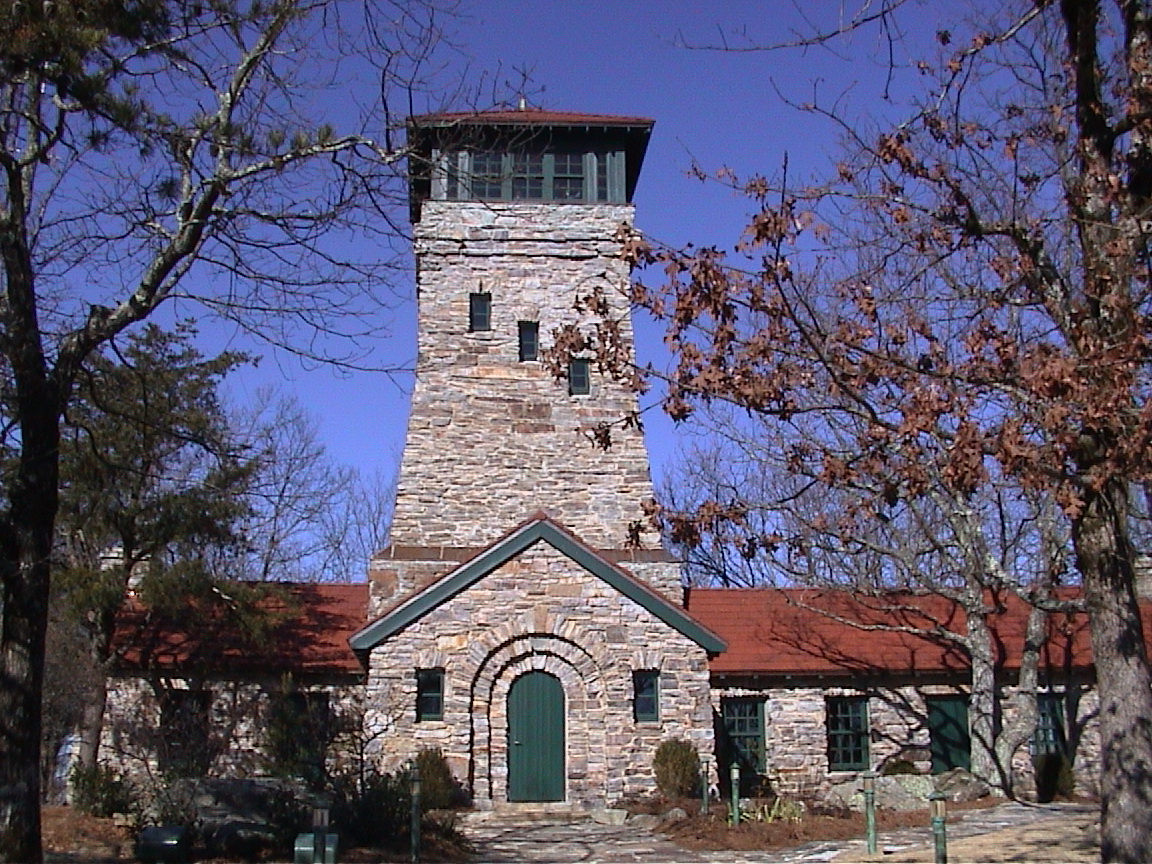
- Bunker Tower atop Mount Cheaha
- Interactive map of the Bunker Tower area
- Former names: Bunker Observation Tower

General information
- Type: Observation tower
- Architectural style: Rustic architecture
- Location: Cheaha Mountain, Alabama
- Coordinates: 33.485556°N 85.809167°W
- Construction started: 1933
- Completed: 1934
- Owner: State of Alabama

Technical details
- Structural system: rubble masonry

Alabama Register of Landmarks and Heritage
- Designated: December 15, 1989

Bunker Tower is a native rubble stone building serving as an observation tower on Cheaha Mountain in Cleburne County, Alabama's Cheaha State Park. The tower is located on Cheaha's tallest peak. At 2,407 feet (734 m) above sea level, it is the highest point in Alabama. The tower, built in a rustic architectural style, was completed in 1934 by the Civilian Conservation Corps. Park offices and a gift shop originally occupied the first floor wings connected to either side of the tower.

The tower is immediately adjacent to a tall Alabama Public Television WCIQ transmitter tower which aids as a landmark among the trees and foliage atop Mount Cheaha. Bunker Tower was added to the Alabama Register of Landmarks and Heritage on December 15, 1989.
