= Alabama Public Television =

PBS member network serving Alabama, United States

- Type: Non-commercial educational broadcast television network
- Branding: APT PBS
- Country: United States
- First air date: January 7, 1955
- Broadcast area: statewide Alabama
- ERP: See table below
- Owner: Alabama Educational Television Commission
- Parent: Government of Alabama
- Digital channel: See table below
- Virtual channel: See table below
- Sister Stations: WLRH-FM Huntsville
- Callsign meaning: See table below intelligence quotient
- Affiliation: PBS
- Former affiliations: NET (1955–1970)
- Official website: www.aptv.org

Alabama Public Television (APT) is a state network of PBS member television stations serving the U.S. state of Alabama. It is operated by the Alabama Educational Television Commission (AETC), an agency of the Alabama state government which holds the licenses for all of the PBS member stations licensed in the state. The broadcast signals of the nine stations cover almost all of the state, as well as parts of Florida, Georgia, Mississippi and Tennessee. The network produces public affairs, cultural, natural history, and documentary programming; broadcast and online education programs for classroom use and teacher professional development; and electronic field trips serving K-12 students.

APT's offices and network operations center are located in Birmingham. The network also maintains studios adjacent to Patterson Field in the state capital of Montgomery, as well as a small secondary studio in the basement of the Alabama State House (not to be confused with the capitol building). APT also operated a studio in Washington, D.C., in partnership with the Folger Shakespeare Library. The AETC has operated a single public radio station, WLRH (89.3 FM) in Huntsville, since 1977.

== History ==
Alabama was one of the earliest states to enter into educational television broadcasting when the Alabama Legislature created the Alabama Educational Television Commission in 1953. In an unusual move at the time, the Commission requested allocations for four stations that would air the same programming at all times, fed from a central studio in Birmingham. At the time, it was apparent that much of the state outside of Birmingham, Montgomery, and Mobile was too poor and too rural to support stand-alone educational stations. The Commission thus wanted to ensure that all of the state's children would have access to educational television.

After two years of preparation, the AETC began the nation's ninth educational television station, WEDM in Munford, serving the eastern central part of the state. The transmitter was located atop Cheaha Mountain, the highest point in Alabama. When WBIQ in Birmingham came online in April 1955, Alabama became the first state in the nation with an educational television network. Alabama Educational Television made its first broadcast as a network shortly after WBIQ signed on. Since then, 25 other states have started public television networks, most based on Alabama's model. The network changed its name to the Alabama Public Television Network in the late 1960s, and shortened the name to simply Alabama Public Television in 1988.

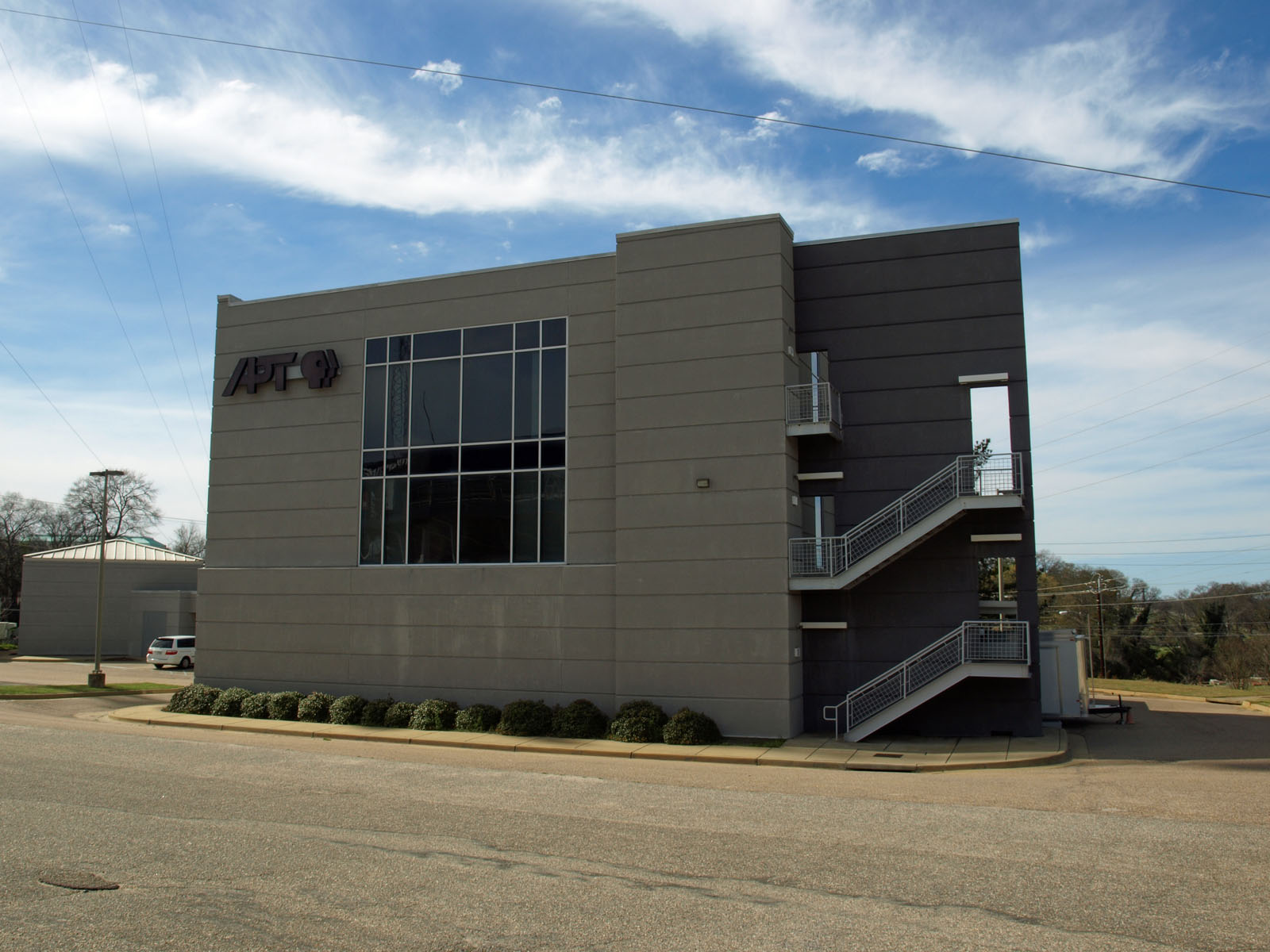
APT's studio in Montgomery

WAIQ in Andalusia (now WDIQ in Dozier) went on the air in August 1956, bringing APT to southern Alabama for the first time before being reassigned to Montgomery in December 1962. WAAY-TV (channel 25) was issued a construction permit in Huntsville in 1962, but never signed on the air (the owners at the time would buy WAFG-TV, on channel 31, instead in 1963). Channel 25 in Huntsville would later become WHIQ in 1965. WAIQ was the first APT station to broadcast a digital signal in 2003, on UHF channel 14, but that signal was later moved to channel 27 on account of Montgomery station WSFA airing its digital signal on channel 14. Commercially licensed station WALA-TV in Mobile donated its former transmitter in Spanish Fort to APT in 1964, allowing WEIQ to bring the network to Alabama's Gulf Coast counties that November. WEIQ's transmitter power was increased during the 1980s.

AETC eventually built a network of nine transmitters covering the state for 16 years ending in 1970. In the 1970s and 1980s, several stations in the metropolitan areas of Alabama aired weekly "cutaway" programs, produced by local entities instead of APT, of interest to their particular viewing areas, but those were eliminated in the 1990s. Since then, all APT stations air the same programming at all times.

The AETC took over the operation of Huntsville public radio station WLRH in 1977, assuming control from the public library system, which had started the station the previous year but found itself unable to manage or fund it properly.

In January 1982, a major ice storm caused the collapse of the WCIQ tower, which was then rebuilt.

In August 2004, APT began datacasting on its digital broadcast signals to distribute digital multimedia content to ten elementary and secondary schools, in a pilot program. The datacasting model was replaced by APTPLUS, an online distribution of multimedia content that became available to every school in Alabama via the Internet. Every public school in Alabama registered to use APTPLUS within its first year of operation. Many private school teachers and home-schooling families are also registered users.

For more than a quarter century, Alabama Public Television aired a nightly public affairs program, For the Record, covering statewide news and Alabama politics. The longest-running program of its kind on a PBS member station or regional or state network, it won an award for Best Local News Program from the National Educational Telecommunications Association (NETA), an organization of public television stations. Capitol Journal succeeded For the Record in 2008 and is produced at APT's State House studio in Montgomery.

APT began broadcasting a high definition channel (APT HD) in 2005. In December 2006 it launched a digital "how-to" channel featuring established cooking, gardening, decorating, crafts, and sewing programs called APT Create. A third digital channel, APT IQ, debuted in March 2007. Originally called APT IQ, the channel became APT World in October 2012 and offers news and documentary programming. 2017 brought the addition of PBS Kids statewide.

== Stations ==
Alabama Public Television stations
Station	City of license (Note: Aside from their transmitters, the APT stations (except WAIQ and WBIQ) do not maintain any physical presence in their cities of license.) (Other cities served)	Channels TV / RF	First air date	Second letter's meaning	ERP	HAAT	Transmitter coordinates	Facility ID	Public license information
WAIQ (Note: WAIQ used the call sign WDIQ during its construction permit from July to October 1961.)	Montgomery (Selma)	26; 27 (UHF)	December 18, 1962	Alabama	600 kW	178.7 m (586 ft)	32°22′55″N 86°17′33″W	706	Public file LMS
WBIQ (Note: WBIQ used the call sign WEDB during its construction permit from 1954 to 1955.)	Birmingham (Tuscaloosa)	10; 10 (VHF)	April 28, 1955	Birmingham	3 kW	426.2 m (1,398 ft)	33°29′4.8″N 86°48′25.2″W	717	Public file LMS
WCIQ (Note: WCIQ used the call sign WEDM ("Educational Munford") from January to March 1955, and then WTIQ (T for Talladega) to 1959. Also, the station's city of license was previously Munford (near Cheaha Mountain) from its 1955 sign-on to 1960, and then, Cheaha State Park, where the station's transmitter is located on the mountain. Because the tower is located in Cleburne County, Nielsen Media Research and therefore the FCC, considers the station to be a part of the Atlanta, Georgia, television market.)	Mount Cheaha (Anniston/Gadsden/Heflin)	7; 12 (VHF)	January 7, 1955	Cheaha	46 kW	598.7 m (1,964 ft)	33°29′6.4″N 85°48′31.9″W	711	Public file LMS
WDIQ (Note: WDIQ used the call sign WAIQ (A for Andalusia) from its 1956 sign-on to 1961. This station's city of license was Andalusia from its 1956 sign-on to 1962.)	Dozier	2; 10 (VHF)	August 8, 1956	Dozier	30 kW	224.8 m (738 ft)	31°33′16.6″N 86°23′31.9″W	714	Public file LMS
WEIQ	Mobile (Pensacola/Fort Walton Beach, FL)	42; 30 (UHF)	November 18, 1964	Educational	427 kW	185.2 m (608 ft)	30°39′34″N 87°53′33″W	721	Public file LMS
WFIQ	Florence (The Shoals)	36; 22 (UHF)	August 9, 1967	Florence	418.8 kW	207.6 m (681 ft)	34°34′41″N 87°47′2″W	715	Public file LMS
WGIQ (Note: The WGIQ transmitter is in Texasville, but WGIQ is licensed to Louisville, Alabama.)	Louisville (Texasville/Dothan/Eufaula/ Phenix City/Columbus, GA)	43; 30 (UHF)	September 9, 1968	Greater Alabama	702 kW	262 m (860 ft)	31°43′5″N 85°26′3″W	710	Public file LMS
WHIQ	Huntsville (Decatur)	25; 24 (UHF)	November 15, 1965	Huntsville	396 kW	344.9 m (1,132 ft)	34°44′12.6″N 86°31′45.1″W	713	Public file LMS
WIIQ	Demopolis (Meridian, MS)	41; 19 (UHF)	September 13, 1970	Informational	1,000 kW	325.3 m (1,067 ft)	32°21′45.5″N 87°52′30.5″W	720	Public file LMS

=== Coverage areas ===
Station	Signal reach
WAIQ	Montgomery and the southern portion of the geographical center of the state
WBIQ	Birmingham and the northern portion of the geographical center of Alabama and the west central counties of the state including the city of Tuscaloosa
WCIQ	Talladega, Anniston, Gadsden and Auburn and the east central portion of the state to western Georgia including the western outskirts of Metro Atlanta; also provides secondary signal for Birmingham
WDIQ	The south central portion of the state to Interstate 10 in the Florida Panhandle
WEIQ	Mobile and Baldwin counties along Alabama's Gulf Coast and several counties to the north as well as parts of southeastern Mississippi and the far western Florida Panhandle and the city of Pensacola
WFIQ	Florence and the northwestern portion of the state and some counties in southern central Tennessee and northeastern Mississippi; secondary signal for Decatur
WGIQ	Dothan and most of the southeastern portion of the state and some parts of southwestern Georgia; closest APTV signal to Phenix City
WHIQ	Huntsville, Decatur and most of the north central and northeastern portion of the state as well as some counties in southern central Tennessee; secondary signal for Gadsden
WIIQ	Much of southwestern Alabama in the region known as the "Black Belt" as well as Meridian and some counties in eastern central Mississippi; secondary signal for Tuscaloosa and Selma

== Technical information ==
=== Subchannels ===
All APT stations broadcast the same subchannels x.1 to x.4:

Subchannels of Alabama Public Television transmitters
Subchannel	Res.	Short name	Programming
x.1	1080i	WxIQ HD	PBS
x.2	480i	PBSKIDS	PBS Kids
x.3	480i	CREATE	Create
x.4	480i	WORLD	World
25.5	480i	ETV	Huntsville ETV (WHIQ only)

=== Analog-to-digital conversion ===
Although the DTV Delay Act extended the mandatory deadline to June 12, 2009, APT shut down the analog signals of all ten stations as originally scheduled on February 17, 2009.

- WAIQ shut down its analog signal, over UHF channel 26; the station's digital signal remained on its pre-transition UHF channel 27, using virtual channel 26.
- WBIQ shut down its analog signal, over VHF channel 10; the station's digital signal relocated from its pre-transition UHF channel 53, which was among the high band UHF channels (52–69) that were removed from broadcasting use as a result of the transition, to its analog-era VHF channel 10.
- WCIQ shut down its analog signal, over VHF channel 7; the station's digital signal relocated from its pre-transition UHF channel 56, which was among the high band UHF channels (52–69) that were removed from broadcasting use as a result of the transition, to its analog-era VHF channel 7.
- WDIQ shut down its analog signal, over VHF channel 2; the station's digital signal relocated from its pre-transition VHF channel 11 to channel 10, using virtual channel 2.
- WEIQ shut down its analog signal, over UHF channel 42; the station's digital signal remained on its pre-transition UHF channel 41, using virtual channel 42.
- WFIQ shut down its analog signal, over UHF channel 36; the station's digital signal remained on its pre-transition UHF channel 22, using virtual channel 36.
- WGIQ shut down its analog signal, over UHF channel 43; the station's digital signal remained on its pre-transition UHF channel 44, using virtual channel 43.
- WHIQ shut down its analog signal, over UHF channel 25; the station's digital signal remained on its pre-transition UHF channel 24, using virtual channel 25.
- WIIQ shut down its analog signal, over UHF channel 41; the station's digital signal remained on its pre-transition UHF channel 19, using virtual channel 41.

On July 29, 2010, WBIQ received a construction permit to move its digital channel from channel 10 to channel 39. The station has returned to its analog-era VHF channel 10 during the 2019 television repack.

During the 2019 television repack, WCIQ moved to VHF channel 12, while WEIQ and WGIQ relocated to UHF channel 30.

== Controversies ==
In 1976, the Federal Communications Commission (FCC) delayed the renewal of, then briefly revoked, AETC's licenses due to APT's refusal to air programs about the Vietnam War or the African-American community. APT management feared that airing these types of programs would cause angry public officials to cut the network's funding and put the network's future in jeopardy. Therefore, APT followed orders by state officials not to air certain programming during the 1960s and 1970s. However, it has taken a more independent stance over the last 40 or so years.

In May 2019, APT became one of two PBS state networks, along with the Arkansas Educational Television Network, to decline to broadcast an episode of the animated children's series Arthur because it features a same-sex wedding; APT opted to air a rerun of an earlier episode instead. The program director, Mike McKenzie, said that it would be "a violation of trust" for the station to broadcast the episode, and said that the decision was made because some children might watch the episode without their parents, and some children younger than the episode's target demographic might watch the segment. Alabama Public Television had also rejected an episode of the spin-off Postcards from Buster that depicted a same-sex couple in 2005. PBS offered free online streaming of the episode for a limited time to families desiring to view it.

== See also ==
- List of television stations in Alabama
- Discovering Alabama – APT's natural history program
