= Discovering Alabama =

Television series on Alabama Public Television

Discovering Alabama is a series on Alabama Public Television about Alabama's natural history. It is hosted by Doug Phillips, a naturalist-educator with the Alabama Museum of Natural History which produces the show. Broadcast since 1985, the show has won four Southeast Emmy Awards. It is the longest running show on Alabama Public Television and one of the station's most popular.

The show has aired more than 100 episodes in its 40-year history. As of 2019, 76 episodes were digitized and posted online.

The show has a partnership with the Alabama Department of Education.

Phillips wrote the 2002 book Discovering Alabama Wetlands with photographs by Robert P. Falls and a foreword by Edward O. Wilson. In 2006 Phillips book Discovering Alabama Forests was published. He was inducted into the university of Alabama Hall of Fame in 2023 for his work on the show.

== Selected episodes ==
- Alabama's state capitals (2023)
- Whooping cranes (2023)
- "Tuscaloosa" (2019), about the history of Tuscaloosa
- Flint River (2016)
- Alabama in Space (2010), regional Emmy Award winner 2010
- Wildlife history (2004)
- Long Leaf Ecosystem (1998)
