= Conecuh National Forest =

National Forest in Alabama, US

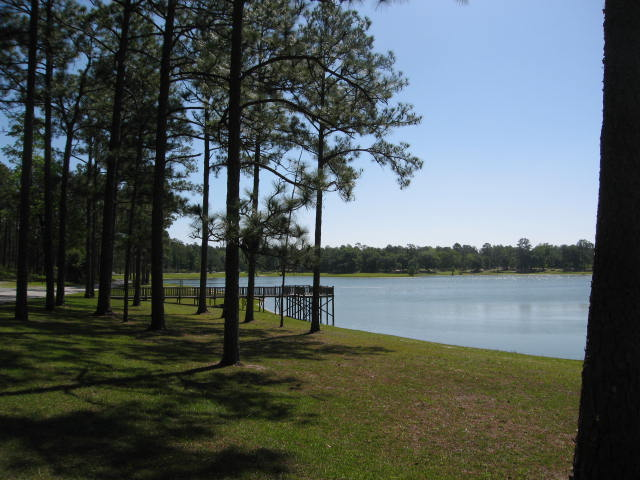
- Open Pond Recreation Area in Conecuh National Forest

- Location within the United States
- Location: Covington / Escambia counties, Alabama, USA
- Nearest city: Andalusia, AL
- Coordinates: 31°5′54″N 86°38′18″W
- Area: 83,861 acres (339.37 km^{2})
- Max. elevation: 339 ft. (103 m), 31.1359, -86.5967
- Established: July 17, 1936
- Governing body: U.S. Forest Service
- Website: Official website

The Conecuh National Forest in southern Alabama covers 83,000 acres (340 km^{2}), along the Alabama - Florida line in Covington and Escambia counties. Topography is level to moderately sloping, broad ridges with stream terraces and broad floodplains.

The Conecuh Trail winds 20 miles (30 km) through Alabama's coastal plain. The trail was built by the Youth Conservation Corps. Each year, beginning in 1976, the young people of the Corps extend the trail through park-like longleaf pine stands, hardwood bottomlands, and other plant communities of the Conecuh National Forest.

The name Conecuh is believed to be of Muskogee origin. It means "land of cane," which is appropriate because the trail runs through canebrakes in several sections.

Situated just above the Florida panhandle, the forest has a distinct southern flavor of mist-laden hardwood swamps, pitcher plant bogs, and southern coastal plain pine forest. These hilly coastal plains are also home to longleaf pine, upland scrub oak, and dogwood, as well as an aquatic labyrinth of winding creeks and cypress ponds.

Clear-cut in the 1930s, the Conecuh was reforested with slash pine that reduced the number of nesting trees for the endangered red-cockaded woodpecker. The forest is currently undergoing a reforestation from slash pine to the native longleaf. In time, this should increase the number of red-cockaded woodpeckers as the trees mature.

The forest is headquartered in Montgomery, as are all four of Alabama's National Forests. The other National Forests in this state are Talladega, Tuskegee, and William B. Bankhead. There are local ranger district offices located in Andalusia.

== Recreational Facilities ==
There are two developed National Forest recreation areas in Conecuh National Forest. Both are located along Alabama State Road 137 north of the community of Wing.

=== Open Pond Recreation Area ===
Open Pond Recreation Area is a 450-acre area set aside for hiking, fishing, bicycling, and camping. It is located about eight miles north of the Alabama/Florida State line along Alabama State Road 137. At the center of the recreation area is Open Pond, a natural sinkhole lake. Several other lakes are in the immediate vicinity of the facilities and can be reached by trail or on unpaved roads. Open Pond itself is available for freshwater fishing. Two piers are available, and non-motorized or electric motorized boats are permitted on the lake (two boat ramps are available for launching). An Alabama fishing license is required. Also available is a large picnic shelter for group gatherings. This shelter was constructed by the Civilian Conservation Corps in 1938, according to a plaque in the log and stone structure. No swimming is allowed at Open Pond.

==== Fees ====
Day use fees at Open Pond are US$5 per vehicle. This allows for all recreational uses (picnics, hiking, bicycling, fishing, etc.). These fees may be waived if someone in the vehicle possesses a valid Federal Interagency Recreation Pass. Camping fees for non-electric sites are US$6, and US$12 for electric/water sites. Discounts are available for camping fees when using the senior citizen Federal Interagency Recreation Passes. With the senior Interagency Recreation Pass, camping fees are US$3 for non-electric sites, and US$8 for electric/water sites. Those paying for campsites do not have to pay day use fees. Day use fees paid at Open Pond may also be used to enter the Blue Lake Recreation Area two miles north of Open Pond.

==== Camping ====
Seventy-five campsites are available on a first-come, first-served basis at the Open Pond Campground. Campsites are found on the waterfront as well as in woodlands. There are four campground loops (A, B, C, and D). Roadways along all loops are paved.

The "A Loop" is primarily for tent camping, and water is available at spigots in the loop. There are no electric hookups in the A Loop. Restrooms and showers are available within the "A Loop". There are ten campsites available.

The "B Loop" is a group camping area. There are no hookups, restrooms, or showers in the "B Loop". The group camping area generally consists of a large field surrounded by woodlands, clearly separated from the developed camping loops. A trail connects to water supplies in the "A Loop". Restrooms and showers are a short hike away in the "C Loop".

The "C and D Loops" are both similar in that they provide recreational vehicles (RV) water electric hookups. 15, 30, and 50 Amp receptacles are available. Each site consists of a fine gravel pad for an RV, a pad for a tent, picnic table, and lantern hangar. Several sites are entirely concrete and are primarily for, but not limited to, use as handicapped accessible. These loops contain modern restrooms and bath houses with private hot showers. Forty campsites are located in the "C Loop", while twenty-five sites are in the "D Loop".

An RV dump station is located at the entrance to the Open Pond Recreation Area.

Trails connect the "D Loop" of the campground to additional small sinkhole ponds and the day-use picnic areas. By using the roadway that begins at the picnic areas, hiking and bicycling around Open Pond is possible. The trail is blazed with small white diamond reflective signs attached to trees and posts.

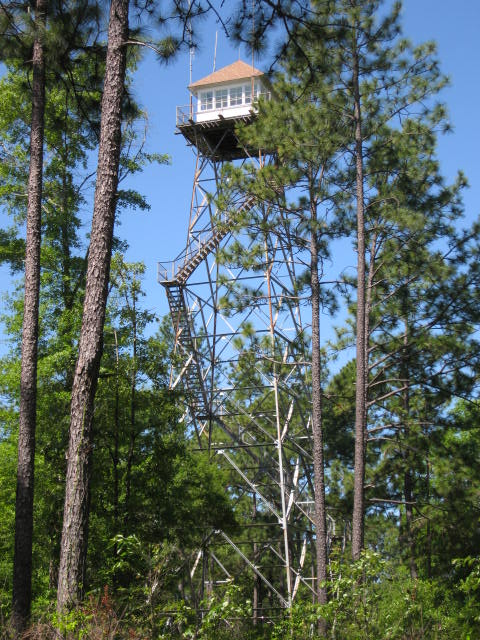
Open Pond Fire Lookout Tower

==== Open Pond Fire Tower ====
The Open Pond Fire Tower is located on the north side of the Open Pond Recreation Area. According to a plaque at the bottom of the tower, the tower was built in 1938. The plaque indicates the tower is registered as U.S. Tower #97 on the National Historic Lookout Register. According to the Register, the tower was constructed between 1938 and 1939 by the Civilian Conservation Corps. The tower is one of two such towers in Conecuh National Forest.

=== Blue Lake Recreation Area ===
Blue Lake Recreation Area is located about nine miles north of the Alabama/Florida State line off of Alabama State Road 137. This day use area, located along the north shore of Blue Lake, provides the only official location in Conecuh National Forest where swimming is permitted. A bath house is provided, along with picnic tables and a small sandy beach. Limited non-motorized boating is permitted, and two boat launches are available.

==== Fees ====
There is a day use fee of US$5 per vehicle. This allows for all recreational uses available at Blue Lake. These fees may be waived if someone in the vehicle possesses a valid Federal Interagency Recreation Pass. Day use fees paid at Blue Lake may also be used to enter the Open Pond Recreation Area (day use only) two miles south of Blue Lake.

==== Adjacent Land Use ====
The south, west, and eastern shores of Blue Lake are privately held by the Alabama-West Florida Conference of the United Methodist Church under the name "Blue Lake Methodist Assembly".

== See also ==
- List of national forests of the United States
