= Pinhoti National Recreation Trail =

Recreational trail in Alabama and Georgia, United States

Coordinates: 32.9781°N 86.3547°W

Pinhoti Trail
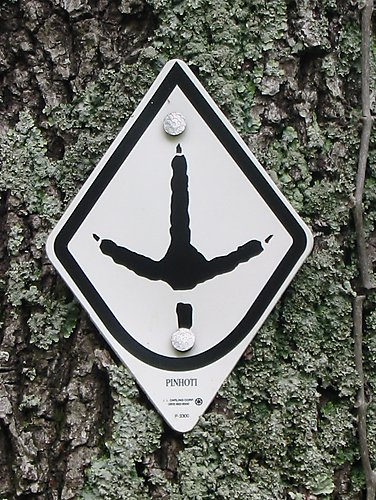
- Pinhoti Trail Marker / Blaze
- Length: 351 mi (565 km)
- Location: Georgia and Alabama, United States
- Designation: National Recreation Trail (1977) 103.6 miles (166.7 km) in the Talladega National Forest
- Trailheads: Flagg Mountain in Alabama / Benton MacKaye Trail in Georgia
- Use: Hiking & MTB
- Grade: 8%
- Season: all
- Months: all
- Surface: Soil

The Pinhoti Trail is a Southern Appalachian Mountains long-distance trail, 335 miles (540 km) in length, located in the United States within the states of Alabama and Georgia. The trail's southern terminus is on Flagg Mountain, near Weogufka, Alabama, the southernmost peak in the state that rises over 1,000 feet (300 m). (The mountain is often called the southernmost Appalachian peak, though by most geological reckonings, the actual Appalachian range ends somewhat farther north in Alabama.) The trail's northern terminus is where it joins the Benton MacKaye Trail. The trail's highest point is Buddy Cove Gap, with an elevation of 3164 feet near the Cohutta Wilderness. Its lowest point above sea level is close to Weogufka Creek near Weogufka State Forest at 545 feet.

The Pinhoti Trail is a part of the Eastern Continental Trail and the Great Eastern Trail, both very long-distance US hiking trails connecting multiple states.

== Geographic characteristics ==
The north terminus is approximately 26 miles (40 km) northwest of Springer Mountain, which is the southern terminus of the Appalachian Trail.

Georgia has about 164 miles (260 km) of the trail, and Alabama contains the other 171 miles (280 km) of the 335-mile-long (540 km) trail.

== History ==
From the Pinhoti Trail Alliance. The PTA Facebook account has the most history and current trail conditions online.

"The Pinhoti Trail is considered the realization of forester Benton MacKaye's original 1921 vision of a trail extending the length of the Appalachian Mountain chain, connecting several existing trails, and sprinkled with permanent camps and constructed to "stimulate every line of outdoor non-industrial endeavor," including recreation, recuperation, agriculture and study. He hoped to spark a "back to the land" movement to relieve the ills of urban industrial life."

From the Georgia Pinhoti Trail Association website:

The original plan for the Appalachian Trail was laid out in 1925 at the first Appalachian Trail Conference. This plan showed a main trail running from Cohutta Mountain in north Georgia to Mount Washington in New Hampshire. This plan also proposed a spur trail from Mt. Washington to Mount Katahdin in Maine and one from the Georgia Mountains into Northern Alabama. The spur in Maine was completed in 1940, while the spur into Alabama has yet to be blazed. However, the effort to make this Alabama spur trail a reality is underway and is the result of persistent work of many groups, individuals, agencies and organizations.

Construction of the Alabama Pinhoti Trail began in 1970 within the Talladega National Forest in east central and northeast Alabama. In 1977, the Talledega National Forest portions of the trail were designated a National Recreation Trail. By 1983, 60 miles (100 km) of trail had been constructed and Mike Leonard of the Alabama Wilderness Coalition along with Al Shumaker, Richard Lindsey, Pete Conroy and Bruce Hutchinson proposed connecting the Pinhoti to the Appalachian Trail in Georgia. The U.S. Forest Service and Alabama's Forever Wild land trust aided in the acquisition of major wilderness tracts. The Pinhoti Trail currently travels through some of those acquired lands and others in which it is planned to go through.

The Pinhoti Trail was initially completed in February 2008, and officially opened to the public on March 16, 2008. Efforts continue to improve the trail, mainly involving moving road walk sections of the trail onto trails away from the road. A new southern terminus of the trail at the base of Flagg Mountain, opened in March 2015.

=== Appalachian Trail designation ===
Occasionally, a small but vocal group of Alabama hiking groups have been advocating to officially designate the Pinhoti Trail as a part of the Appalachian Trail — a move that would make Flagg Mountain the southern terminus of the AT. However, these attempts have garnered a significant amount of backlash from Facebook communities dedicated to the Alabama Pinhoti Trail, though the effort has extensive support among Alabama citizens and Alabama State Government.

== Trails used in the system ==
- Johns Mountain Trail and the Keown Falls loop trail
- Simms Mountain Rail Trail
- The Pinhoti joins the Chief Ladiga Trail, a 33-mile-long (53 km) rail trail, for a short portion.

== Connecting trails ==
- The northeastern terminus is the Benton MacKaye Trail.
- Heflin Spur (3.5 miles) established in August 2018 connecting with the Pinhoti at FS 500 parking lot to Heflin City Hall.
- Chinnabee Silent Trail (8.0 miles) established in 1977 connecting with the Pinhoti at Little Caney Head in the Cheaha Wilderness to the Chinnabee Lake Recreation Area.

== Public lands traversed ==
- Weogufka state forest
- Talladega National Forest including the Cheaha Wilderness and the Dugger Mountain Wilderness. Talledega National Forest has 140 miles (230 km) of trail in its boundaries.
- Most of the Georgia Pinhoti Trail is in the Chattahoochee National Forest.
- Indian Mountain Complex managed by Alabama's Forever Wild

== See also ==
- List of Hiking Trails in Alabama
