= Tuskegee National Forest =

US National Forest in Alabama

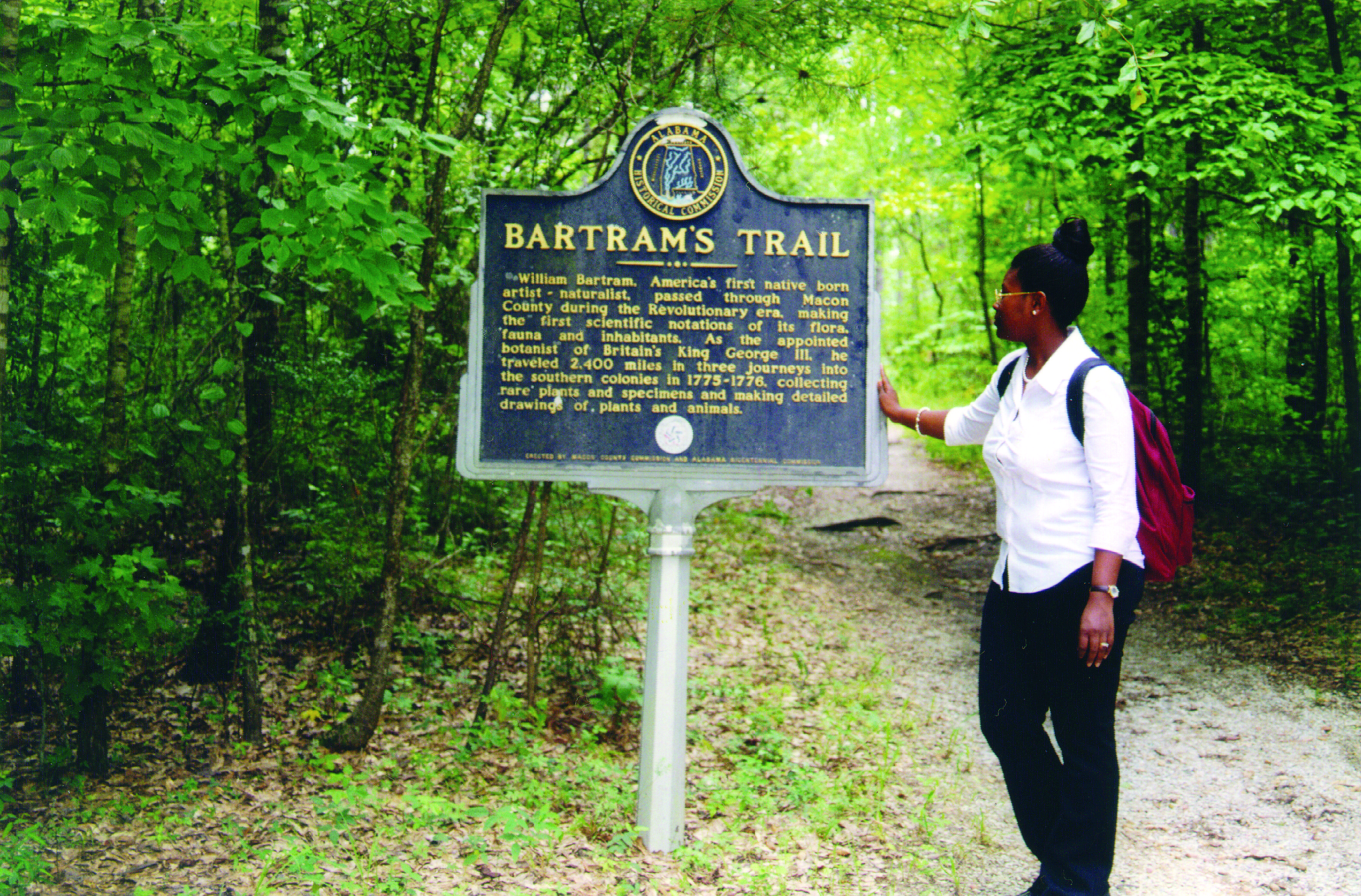
- Visitor on Bartram's Trail, Tuskegee National Forest, July 2015

- Location within the United States
- Location: Macon County, Alabama, U.S.
- Nearest city: Tuskegee, AL
- Coordinates: 32°28′35″N 85°36′26″W
- Area: 11,252 acres (45.54 km^{2})
- Max. elevation: 568 ft. (173 m), 32.4853, -85.5592
- Established: November 27, 1959
- Governing body: U.S. Forest Service
- Website: Official website

The Tuskegee National Forest is a U.S. National Forest located in Macon County, Alabama, just north of Tuskegee and west of Auburn. The topography is level to moderately sloping, with broad ridges with stream terraces and broad floodplains.

Tuskegee National Forest is the smallest national forest in the U.S. (and one of only six that is contained entirely within a single county), but supports many outdoor activities.

The forest is headquartered in Montgomery, as are all four of Alabama's National Forests. The other National Forests in the state are Conecuh, Talladega and William B. Bankhead. There are local ranger district offices located in Tuskegee.

== Outdoor activities ==
There are four main hiking trails within the National Forest and three of these are also mountain biking trails. In particular, part of the Bartram Trail runs through the National Forest. There are also horse trails, two fish ponds, the Uchee Shooting Range, Tsinia Wildlife Viewing Area, primitive camping and the Taska Recreation Area.

== See also ==
- List of national forests of the United States
