= Talladega National Forest =

Forest in Alabama, United States

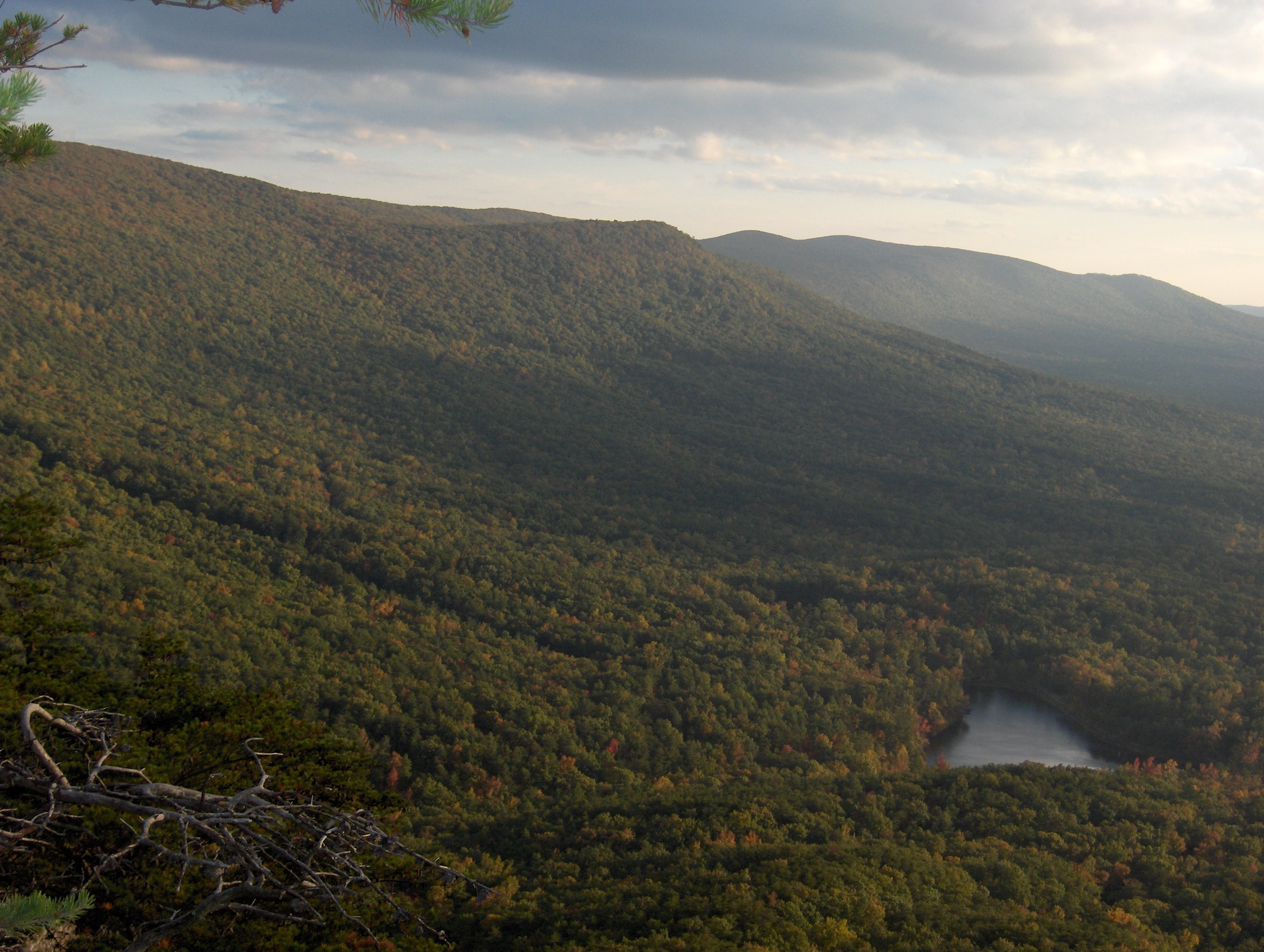
- Cheaha Mountain, Alabama's highest point, is located in Talladega National Forest.

- Location within the United States
- Location: Alabama, U.S.
- Nearest city: Talladega, Alabama
- Coordinates: 33°11′46″N 86°27′45″W
- Area: 392,567 acres (1,588.66 km^{2})
- Established: July 17, 1936
- Governing body: U.S. Forest Service
- Website: http://www.fs.usda.gov/r08/alabama

The Talladega National Forest is located in the U.S. state of Alabama and covers 392,567 acres (613.39 sq mi, or 1,588.66 km^{2}) at the southern edge of the Appalachian Mountains.

Before it was bought by the federal government in the 1930s, the area that composes the Talladega was extensively logged and represented some of the most abused, eroded wastelands in all of Alabama. Pine forest regrowth now hosts a diverse eco-system.

The tiny 7,400 acre (30 km^{2}) Cheaha Wilderness preserves a portion of this natural wealth on Talladega Mountain. The forest's second wilderness area, the Dugger Mountain Wilderness, protects the area around Alabama's second-highest mountain peak.

Indigenous animals inhabiting this forest include coyote, black bear, white-tailed deer, two species of fox, bobwhite quail, two species of squirrel, turkey, rabbit, raccoon, and various waterfowl. Talladega National Forest is home to several threatened, endangered, and sensitive species including the seepage salamander, eastern spotted skunk, and the red-cockaded woodpecker. The critically endangered American Chestnut has also been found in the Talladega National Forest.

This forest is headquartered in Montgomery, as are all four of Alabama's National Forests. The other National Forests in the state are Conecuh, Tuskegee, and William B. Bankhead. The Talladega National Forest is physically separated into two areas, and divided into three Ranger Districts:

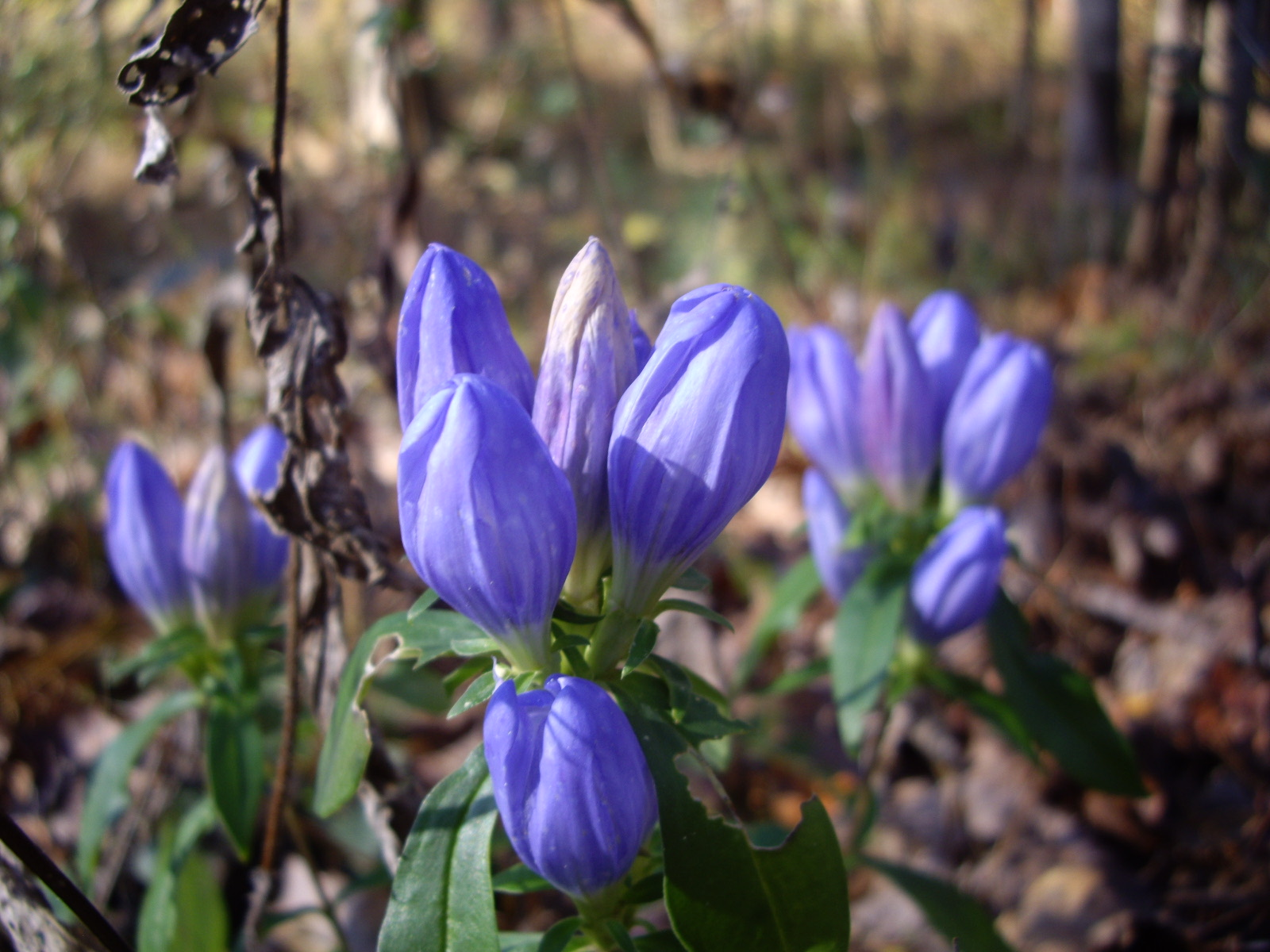
Alabama Gentians in Talladega National Forest

- Oakmulgee District lies in the central part of the state, east of Tuscaloosa in Hale, Tuscaloosa, Bibb, Perry, Chilton, and Dallas Counties. It consists of level to moderately sloping, broad ridges with stream terraces and broad floodplains. The ranger station is located in Brent. This district lies within the Southeastern mixed forests ecoregion and supports mixed forests of pine and oak.
- The Shoal Creek and Talladega Districts are located in the northeastern part of the state in Cherokee, Calhoun, Cleburne, Talladega and Clay Counties. They consist of upland hills and low mountains with predominantly moderately steep slopes. They support Appalachian mixed mesophytic forests. The Shoal Creek ranger station is located in Heflin and the Talladega ranger station in its namesake city of Talladega.

The forest covers parts of eleven counties in Alabama. In descending order of forest land area they are Cleburne, Clay, Bibb, Talladega, Perry, Hale, Calhoun, Chilton, Tuscaloosa, Cherokee, and Dallas counties.

== See also ==
- Shoal Creek Church
- List of national forests of the United States
