= Dugger Mountain Wilderness =

Protected area in Alabama, US

- IUCN category Ib (wilderness area)
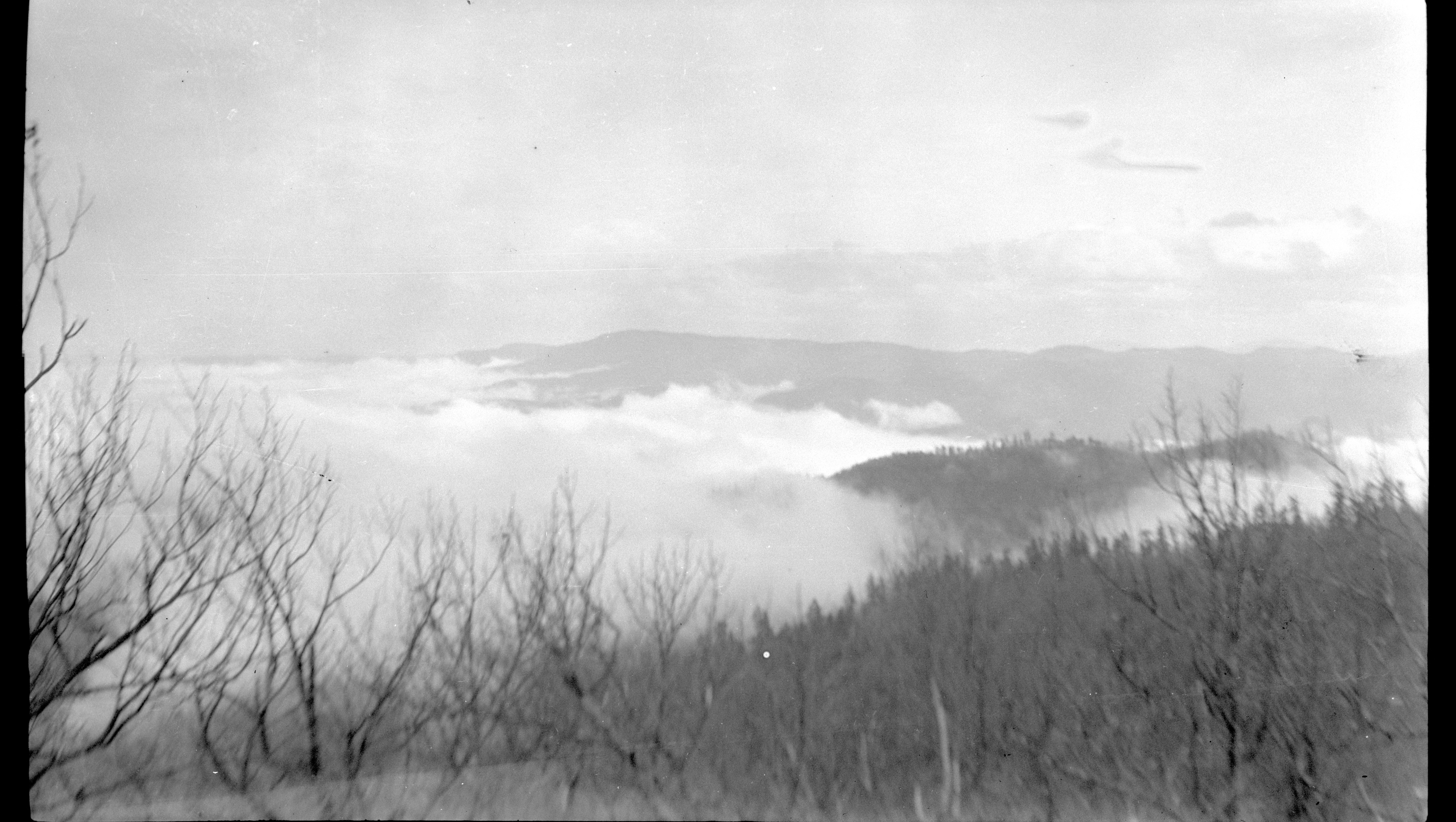
- View looking south from Dugger Mountain

- Location within Alabama Location within the United States
- Location: Cleburne and Calhoun counties, Alabama, USA
- Nearest city: Piedmont
- Coordinates: 33°52′02″N 85°36′04″W
- Area: 9,200 acres (37 km^{2})
- Established: April 1, 2000
- Governing body: U.S. Forest Service

Dugger Mountain Wilderness is Alabama's third and newest wilderness area. Dedicated April 2000, Dugger Mountain Wilderness covers 9,200 acres (3,700 ha) of Talladega National Forest in Calhoun County and Cleburne County in Alabama.

== Geography ==
Dugger Mountain, the second highest peak in Alabama with an elevation of 2,140 feet (650 m), is located between Anniston and Piedmont.

The wilderness encompasses some of the most rugged and mountainous terrain in Alabama, as well as numerous endangered and threatened plant communities. It is one of the last intact roadless areas in Alabama's National Forests. Most of the mountain's 16,000 acres (6,500 ha) were too steep to profitably timber harvest.

== Recreation ==
Backpackers can access Dugger Mountain via the Pinhoti National Recreation Trail, a long-distance (335 mi) backpacking trail that follows the lower Appalachian Mountains. The trail is general considered the only official trail in the Dugger Mountain Wilderness. Camping is allowed on dispersed, pre-established sites on the trail. ("Backpack Trail Guide: Dugger Mountain via the Pinhoti Trail".)

== Features ==
The Pinhoti National Recreation Trail winds through the wilderness area.
