= Cheaha Mountain =

Highest point in Alabama, United States

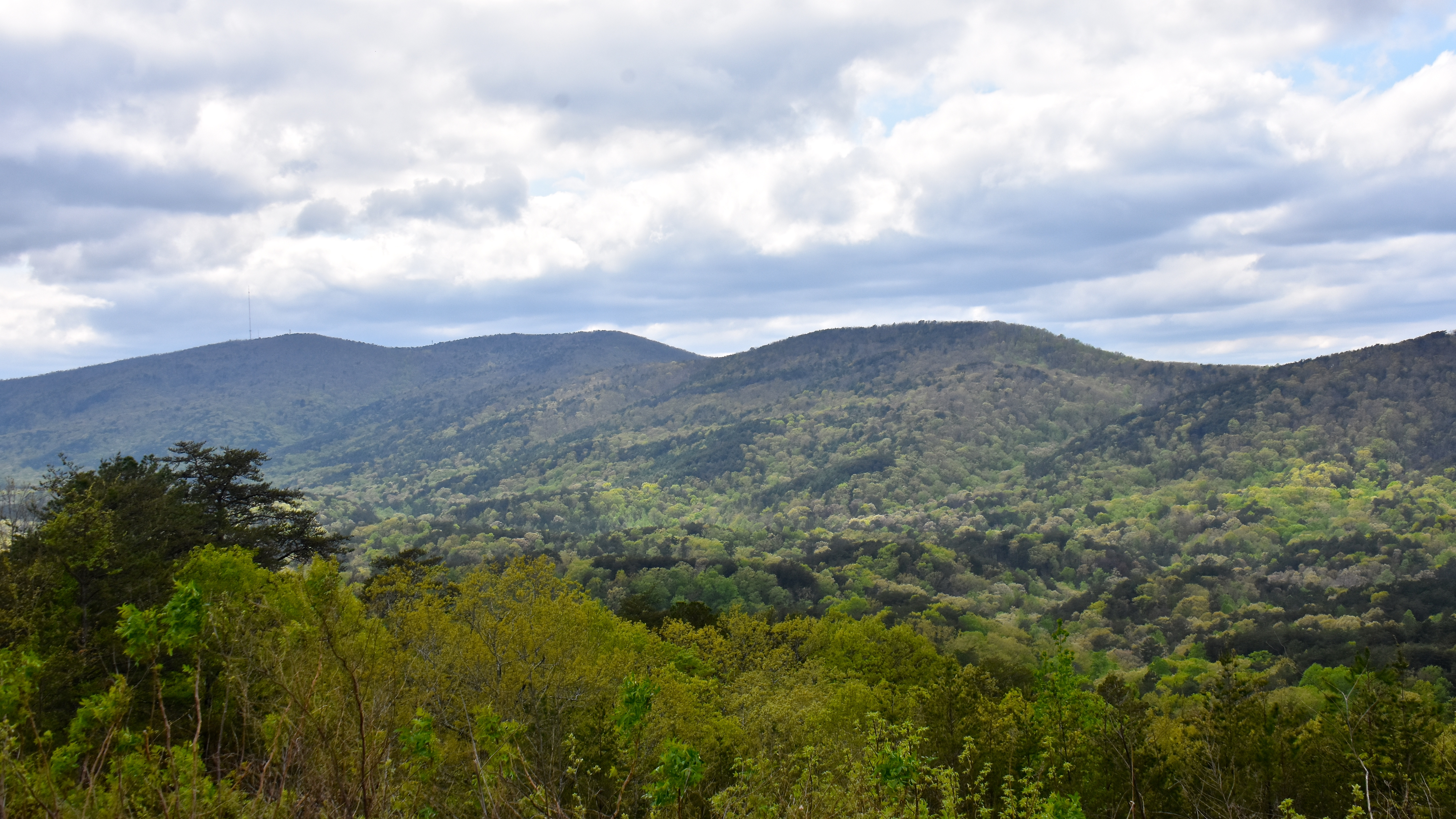
- Cheaha Mountain, the highest point in Alabama, viewed from Skyway Mountainway, April 2018

Highest point
- Elevation: 2,413 ft (735 m)
- Prominence: 1,445 ft (440 m)
- Listing: U.S. state high point 35th
- Coordinates: 33°29′08″N 85°48′31″W

Geography
- Location within Alabama
- Location: Cleburne County, Alabama, U.S.
- Parent range: Ridge-and-Valley Appalachians
- Topo map: USGS Cheaha Mountain

Geology
- Rock age: Devonian
- Mountain type: Metamorphic Plateau

Climbing
- First ascent: Unknown
- Easiest route: Road

Cheaha Mountain /ˈtʃiːhɔː/, often called Mount Cheaha, is the highest natural point in the U.S. state of Alabama. It is located a few miles northwest of the town of Delta in Cheaha State Park, which offers a lodge, a restaurant, and other amenities. The nearest higher peak is Brushy Top in Gilmer County, Georgia, 106.72 miles (171.75 km) away.

== Description ==
The highest point is marked with a USGS benchmark in front of Bunker Tower, a stone Civilian Conservation Corps building with an observation deck on top. The CCC also constructed a road to Cheaha, but the road has been closed for years. The old road is known as CC Road and contains interesting ruins. Near the peak is Bald Rock, which was recently improved with a wheelchair-accessible wooden walkway that provides an impressive overlook of the surrounding region. The mountain was opened to the public as part of Cheaha State Park on June 7, 1939.

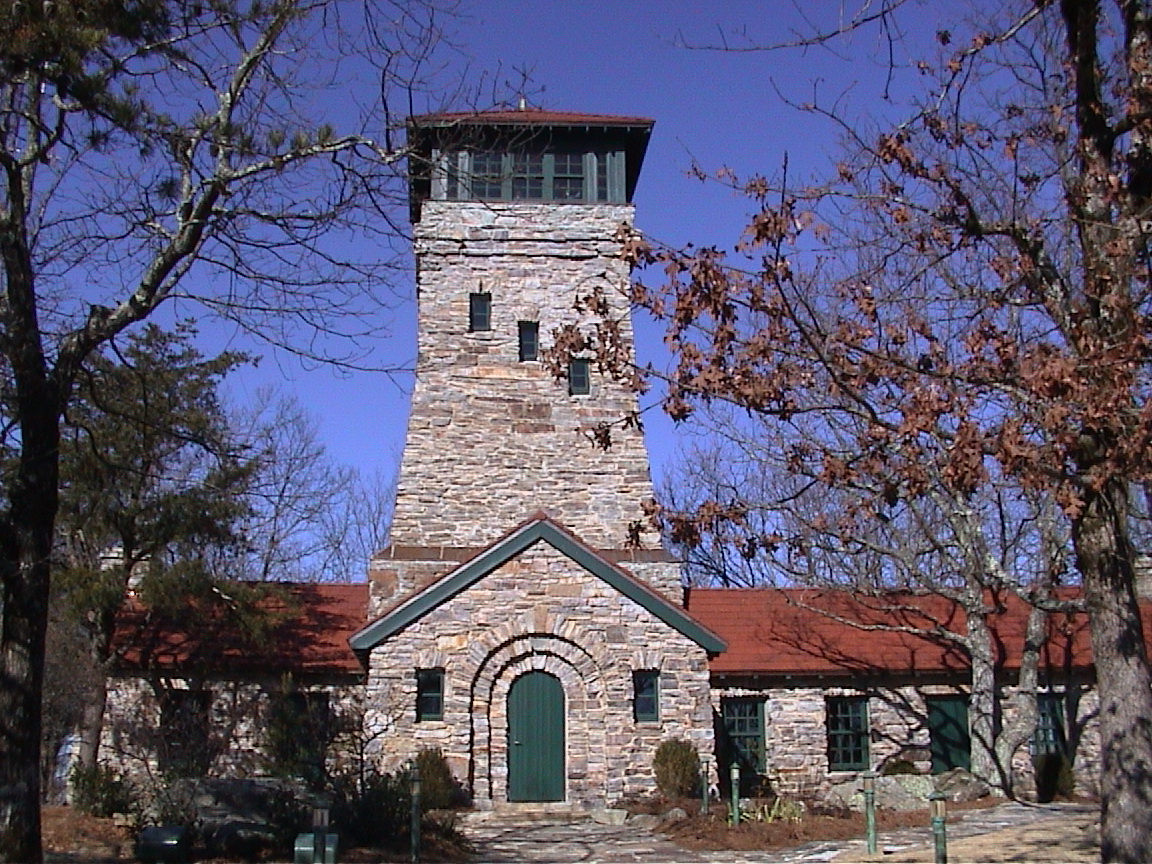
Bunker Tower on top of Cheaha Mountain, December 2003

The mountain is a host to several commercial and public service transmitters. These radio antennas, along with sundry structures dating back to commercial schemes by the state of Alabama in the 1970s, stand in stark contrast to the surrounding natural environment. The Calhoun County Amateur Radio Association has a repeater near the peak, and Alabama Public Television has its transmitter for WCIQ TV 7 on a tower 577 ft (176 m) tall, rebuilt after the January 1982 ice storm brought the previous one crashing to the ground.

== Etymology ==
The name Cheaha is thought to come from the Choctaw word chaha 'high'.

== Geology ==
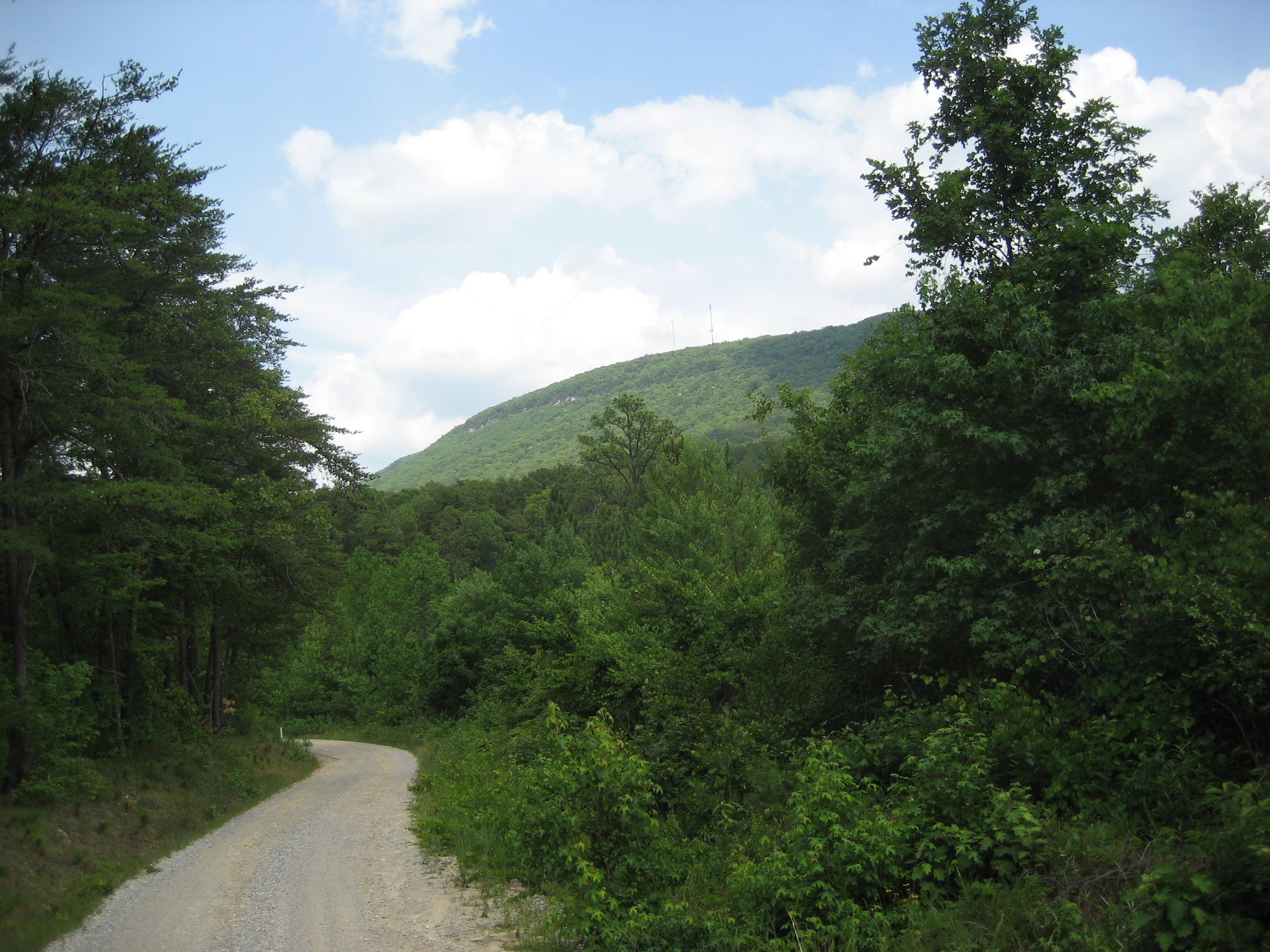
Cheaha Mountain from Kentuck Mountain, with the large Quartzite cliffs visible on the upper slopes of the mountain

Cheaha Mountain is part of the Talladega Mountains, a small section of the Ridge and Valley Mountains, unlike other elevations of the Appalachians in north Alabama, which are part of the Cumberland Plateau. The mountain is the highest point in the eastern portion of the Sun Belt (east of the Mississippi River, south of Interstate 20, and north of the Gulf of Mexico). The summit of the mountain gives an impression of being at a much higher elevation than it actually is, in part because of the relatively low elevation of the adjacent area to the west. For example, the summit of Cheaha Mountain (elevation 2,413 feet or 735 meters) measures roughly 1,725.72 feet (526 meters) above the city of Oxford (elevation 686 feet or 209 meters) near the base of the mountain. Geologically it is composed of weakly metamorphosed sandstones and conglomerates of the Cheaha quartzite, of Silurian / Devonian age, and stands high topographically due to the erosional resistance of these rocks. The soil, only moderately deep, is a brown stony silt loam of the Cheaha series; it is well drained and very strongly acidic.

== See also ==
- List of U.S. states by elevation
