= WWGA =

Coordinates: 33°39′03″N 85°17′41″W

- Tallapoosa, Georgia; United States
- Broadcast area: Carrollton, Georgia; Bremen, Georgia; Heflin, Alabama
- Frequency: 98.9 MHz
- Branding: Great Classics 98.9

Programming
- Format: Classic hits

Ownership
- Owner: WKNG, LLC
- Sister stations: WKNG WBTR-FM WCKS WLBB

History
- First air date: 2010
- Call sign meaning: Wonderful West GA

Technical information
- Licensing authority: FCC
- Facility ID: 183308
- Class: A
- ERP: 6,000 watts
- HAAT: 182 meters (597 ft)

Links
- Public license information: Public file; LMS
- Webcast: Listen live
- Website: WWGA Online

WWGA is a radio station airing a classic hits format licensed to Tallapoosa, Georgia, broadcasting on 98.9 FM. The station serves the areas of Carrollton, Georgia, Bremen, Georgia and Heflin, Alabama, and is licensed to WKNG, LLC. It is operated by Gradick Communications LLC.
