= Interstate 20 in Alabama =

Interstate Highway in Alabama, United States

Interstate 20
- I-20 highlighted in red

Route information
- Maintained by ALDOT
- Length: 214.7 mi (345.5 km)
- NHS: Entire route

Major junctions
- West end: I-20 / I-59 at the Mississippi border near Cuba
- Future I-85 near Cuba; I-359 / US 11 / SR 69 in Tuscaloosa; US 82 in Tuscaloosa; US 11 at various locations; I-459 near Bessemer and in Irondale; I-65 in Birmingham; US 31 / US 280 in Birmingham; I-59 in Birmingham; US 78 at various locations; US 431 in Oxford
- East end: I-20 at the Georgia line near Abernathy

Location
- Country: United States
- State: Alabama
- Counties: Sumter, Greene, Tuscaloosa, Jefferson, St. Clair, Talladega, Calhoun, Cleburne

Highway system
- Interstate Highway System; Main; Auxiliary; Suffixed; Business; Future; Alabama State Highway System; Interstate; US; State
← SR 19	→ SR 20

Interstate 20 (I-20) is a part of the Interstate Highway System that spans 1,539.38 miles (2,477.39 km) from Reeves County, Texas, to Florence, South Carolina. In Alabama, Interstate 20 travels 214.7 miles (345.5 km) through the center of the state. It enters the state from Mississippi near Cuba, and travels northeastward through Tuscaloosa and Birmingham. At Birmingham, I-20 turns eastward and heads through Oxford before crossing the Georgia state line near Lebanon. Other cities on the route include Livingston, Bessemer, and Pell City.

For approximately 130 miles (210 km), more than half its distance within the state, I-20 is concurrent with I-59 from the Mississippi state line to eastern Birmingham near Birmingham–Shuttlesworth International Airport. Mileage and exits on the concurrency are I-59's, although both highways have the same mileage for the Alabama concurrency.

== Route description ==
=== Western Alabama ===
After I-20/I-59 enters Alabama from Mississippi, they travel concurrently northeastward across the Tombigbee River and Black Warrior River delta country which is generally low-lying farmland until reaching Tuscaloosa. This area contains low population. U.S. Route 11 (US 11) parallels this route from Mississippi northeastward while it passes through small towns like York, Livingston, and Eutaw before reaching Tuscaloosa. From the Mississippi–Alabama state line to Tuscaloosa, I-20/I-59 is a four-lane route.

At Tuscaloosa, the highway connects with I-359 which travels northward into downtown Tuscaloosa and to the University of Alabama. After the I-359 junction, the route widens to become six lanes. From Tuscaloosa to Birmingham, the highway continues on an east-northeast heading traveling through rolling forested terrain until reaching I-459 southwest of Bessemer. All of the stretch from Tuscaloosa to the I-459 junction near Bessemer is six lanes. This stretch also hosts the Mercedes auto plant which is a large employer of residents primarily from Jefferson, Tuscaloosa, and Bibb counties. I-459 travels east and then northeast around the southern periphery of the Birmingham area before reconnecting first with I-20 near Irondale and then terminating at I-59 near Trussville. I-422 (Birmingham Northern Beltline) is slated to connect to I-20/I-59 at the I-459 interchange; however, this project is still years away from completion.

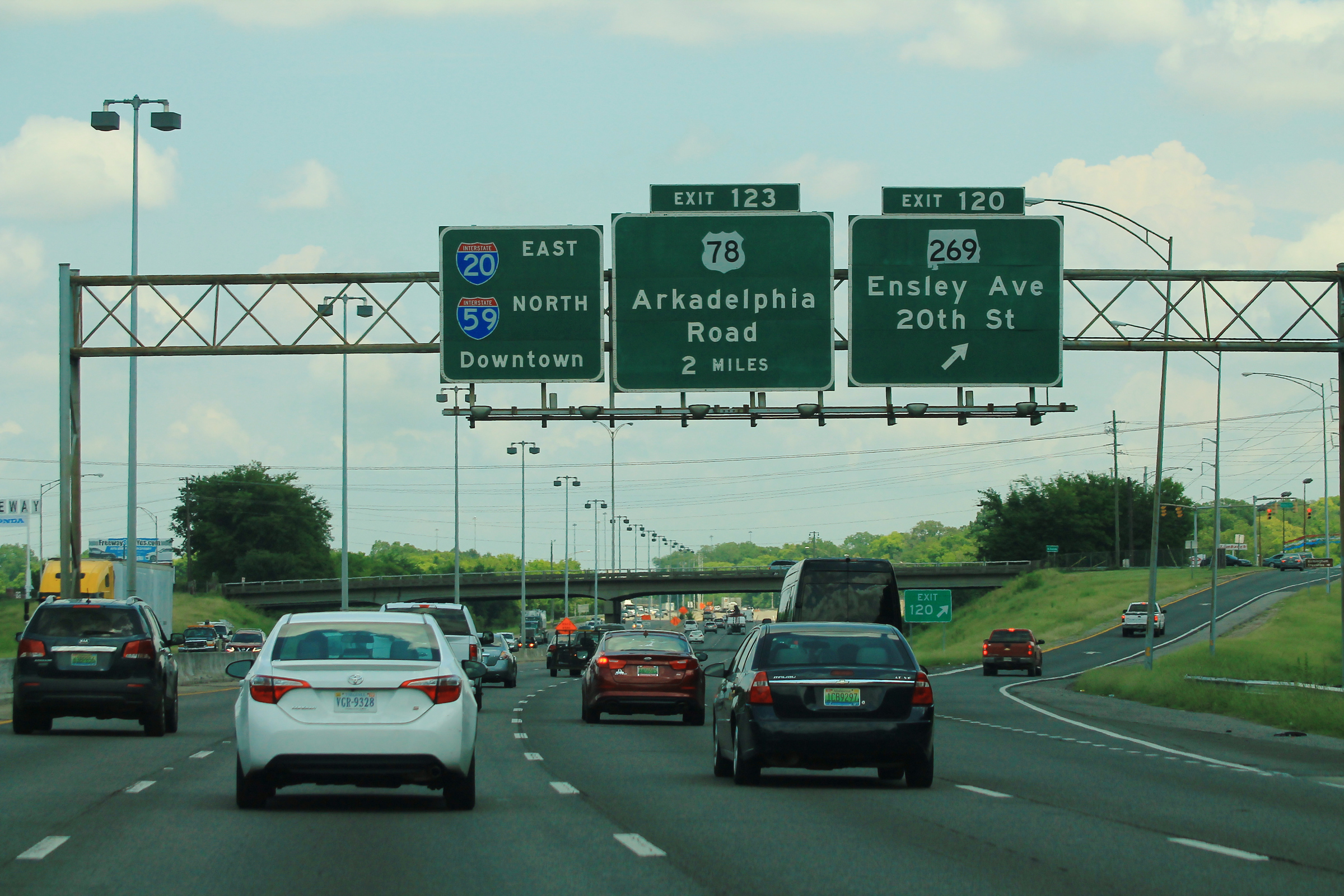
I-20/I-59 approaching Birmingham in Ensley

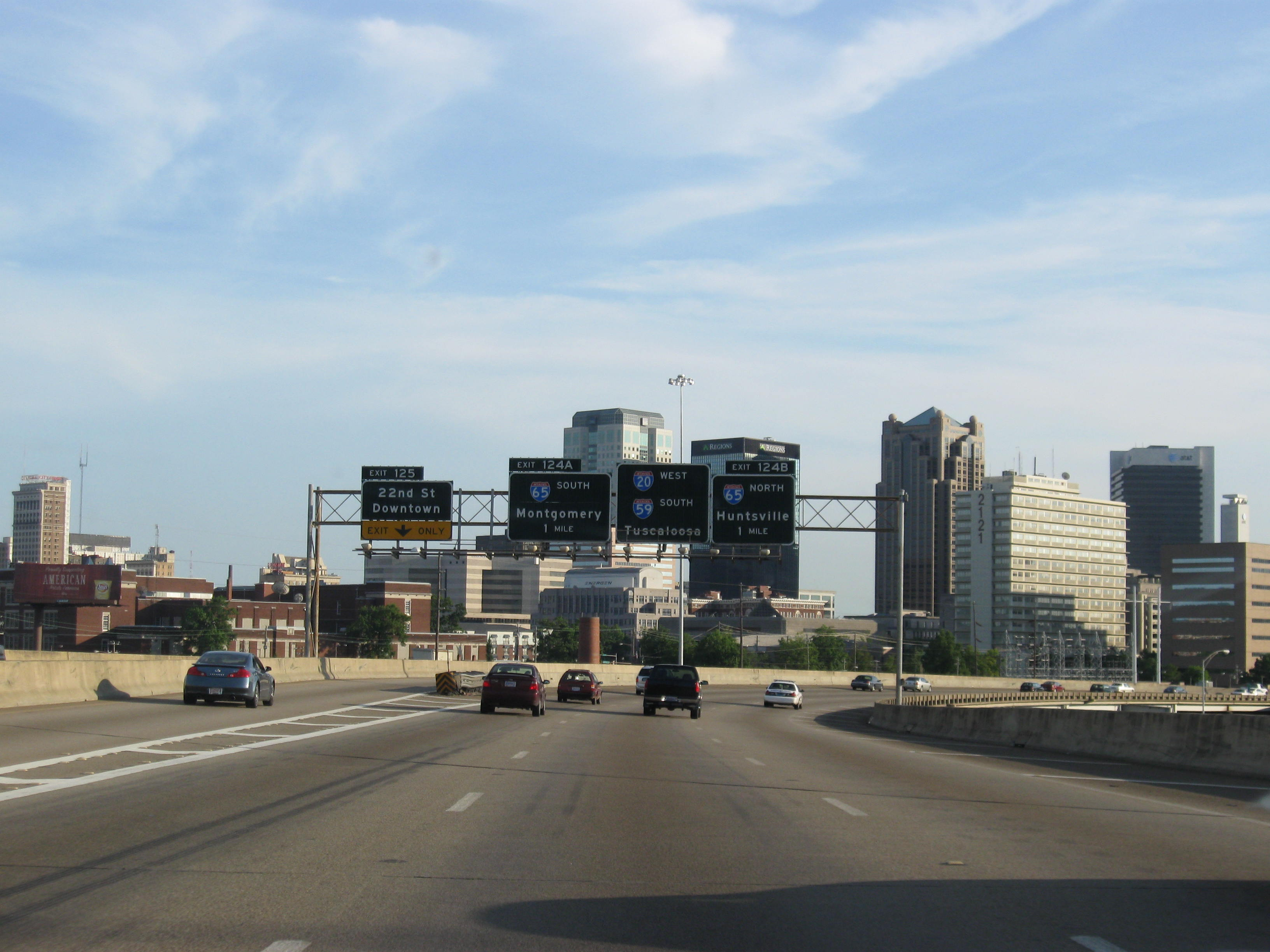
I-20/I-59 approaching I-65 in downtown Birmingham before the section of highway was rebuilt in 2019. This was sometimes referred to locally as Malfunction Junction.

=== Birmingham ===
After passing the I-459 interchange, the highway continues northeast as a four-lane highway through the Birmingham suburbs of Bessemer, Hueytown, and Fairfield before widening after exit 118 in Fairfield to at least six lanes as the interstate approaches Birmingham near the Ensley community. Most of this stretch is through urban areas including passing near the U.S. Steel plant near Fairfield, and visible from the Interstate looking north and northwest are several smokestacks which is all that remain of several large steel mills that used to dominate the Ensley community of Birmingham.

As I-20/I-59 travels eastward just past the Arkadelphia Road exit in the East Thomas community, the highway rises to the top of East Thomas hill, giving eastbound travelers an excellent view of the downtown Birmingham skyline just before reaching the interchange with I-65 (commonly called "Malfunction Junction").

As I-20/I-59 leaves the downtown area, the highway has an interchange with the Elton B. Stephens Expressway, also known locally as the Red Mountain Expressway, which travels south across the downtown area and into the southern Birmingham suburbs.

The highway continues east-northeast through downtown before reaching the Birmingham–Shuttlesworth International Airport where I-59 continues northeast toward Gadsden and I-20 turns eastward toward Atlanta.

Once I-20 turns away from I-59, it begins an eastbound journey toward Georgia. The first two miles (3.2 km) are a four-lane bridge of east Birmingham neighborhoods before reaching the shopping areas formerly known as Eastwood Mall and Century Plaza.

I-20 is a six-lane freeway from exit 132 to exit 162. This highway travels through rolling suburban country and crosses I-459 near Irondale.

=== "Bloody 20" ===
The section of I-20 between Leeds and Pell City was one of the most dangerous stretches of Interstate Highway in Alabama. The terrain is significantly hilly as the route passes across the extreme southern end of the Appalachian Mountains. There are two significant uphill grades in each direction which slows down truck traffic. However, due to the heavy volumes of truck traffic, combined with speeding car traffic, accidents were frequent and sometimes deadly. This part of I-20 was sometimes called "Bloody 20". Between 2010 and 2014, work was completed to add one additional lane in each direction along I-20.

=== Eastern Alabama ===
The highway continues as a six-lane highway until reaching the Coosa River bridge near Riverside. This bridge was scheduled to be replaced when the stretch between the Coosa River and milemarker 172 is widened to six lanes from four lanes. However, no timetable for this project has been announced. Exits 165 and 168 serve the Honda Motor Company which has a plant at Lincoln. Exits 168 and 173 serve the Talladega Superspeedway which hosts two NASCAR racing weeks each year. The terrain east of milemarker 155 until reaching milemarker 191 is the relatively flat Coosa River valley.

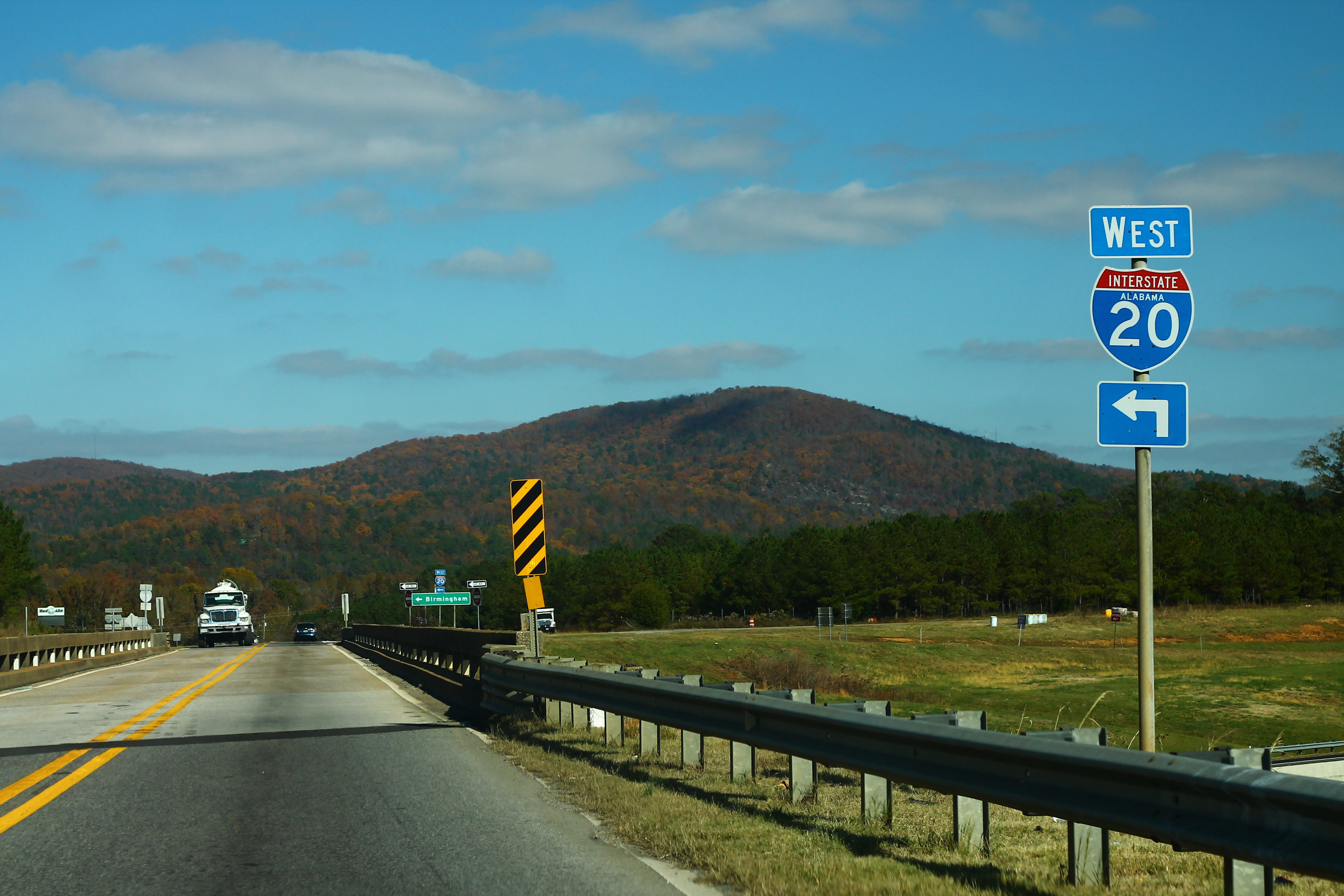
SR 202 at I-20 at exit 179

East of milemarker 172 until milemarker 188, the route is once again six lanes. From exit 188 to exit 205, I-20 narrows again to four lanes. East of exit 205, I-20 becomes a six-lane route until it reaches exit 210. However, in this area, construction is ongoing to widen the last five miles (8.0 km) to six lanes to the Georgia state line. I-20 dives into Oxford from the west into its interchange with Alabama State Route 21 (SR 21). Here, you can see Quintard Mall and some of the highest mountains in Alabama, including Cheaha Mountain. The Anniston–Oxford metropolitan area is served by exits 179, 185, 188, and 191.

Just east of exit 191 is a significant uphill/downhill grade (uphill eastbound/downhill westbound) approximately two miles (3.2 km) long. Truck traffic is significantly slowed by this hill, causing occasional traffic backups. East of this incline, the route travels through generally rural forested rolling country until the Georgia state line, continuing roughly 50 miles (80 km) to Atlanta.

This stretch of Interstate contains multiple parclo Interchanges.

East of Birmingham, US 78 serves as the parallel U.S. Route.

== History ==
The completion of I-20 in Alabama was done in numerous stages. Few segments were completed in such a way that they had interchanges with existing segments. The first section to be opened was a 21-mile-long (34 km) segment between Leeds and Riverside in the early 1960s. The next section to open was a 28-mile-long (45 km) segment between the Tuscaloosa and the Tuscaloosa–Jefferson county line in the mid-1960s.

The next section of I-20 to open in Alabama was a four-mile-long (6.4 km) stretch between Avenue I in Ensley and Arkadelphia Road (US 78/SR 5) near Birmingham–Southern College. This was the first segment of Interstate Highway to open in Birmingham. This segment, as well as a one-mile-long (1.6 km) segment from the Mississippi state line to what is now exit 1, leading to Cuba opened in the late 1960s.

The early 1970s saw more sections of I-20 completed in Alabama, including a 50-mile-long (80 km) segment between Epes and Tuscaloosa, a three-mile-long (4.8 km) segment between Fairfield and Ensley, a two-mile-long (3.2 km) segment between US 78 and I-65, a six-mile-long (9.7 km) segment between US 78 in Riverside and SR 77 in Lincoln, then an additional 13 miles (21 km) leading to SR 21 at Oxford.

During the mid-1970s, I-20 was extended further east in Birmingham. The first segment to open east of I-65 was a short segment leading to 17th Street in downtown, then another segment that extended the route to 22nd Street near the Birmingham–Jefferson Civic Center. The opening of additional segments continuing eastward led to temporary ends of I-20 at SR 79 (Tallapoosa Street) near Birmingham–Shuttlesworth International Airport, then at US 78 in Irondale. Also, the segment of the highway between Bessemer and Fairfield was completed. In the eastern part of the state, I-20 was extended east from Oxford to SR 9 near Heflin.

During the late 1970s, I-20 was completed in east Alabama; however, only six miles (9.7 km) of the highway was opened since it was not complete in Georgia. The segment between the Georgia state line and Douglasville was among the final segments of Interstate Highway to be completed in Georgia. The temporary end of I-20 in Alabama was at SR 46. Also, the final section of I-20 connecting Tuscaloosa and Birmingham was completed, as the section of US 11 between the Tuscaloosa–Jefferson county line and Bessemer was upgraded from an expressway to a limited-access highway.

In the early 1980s, segments connecting Cuba and Livingston and then Livingston and Epes completed I-20 between the Mississippi state line and Birmingham. The final segment of the route to be completed was an eight-mile-long (13 km) section between Irondale and Leeds. This segment opened in 1985.

I-20 has no three-digit spur routes in Alabama, although at one time there was discussion of a spur northward from Oxford into Anniston which would also serve as a connection to the US Army base at Fort McClellan as well as to Gadsden. The closing of the base as well as a lack of population between Anniston and Gadsden eliminated the necessity of such a route. I-459 south of Birmingham connects to I-20 east and west of the city, continuing to I-59 northeast of the routes' split.

On January 21, 2019, along the concurrency with I-59, a segment of the Interstate, as well as an interchange with I-65 locally known as "Malfunction Junction" was closed for demolition; it will be converted to a redesigned stack interchange with right-side exits.

== Exit list ==
County	Location	mi	km	Exit	Destinations	Notes
Sumter		0.000	0.000		I-20 west / I-59 south – Meridian	Continuation into Mississippi
Sumter	Cuba	0.804	1.294	1	To US 80 east (SR 8 east) – Cuba, Demopolis	
Sumter				3	I-85 north – Montgomery	Proposed interchange; future southern terminus of I-85
Sumter	York	8.041	12.941	8	SR 17 – York	
Sumter	Livingston	17.059	27.454	17	SR 28 – Livingston, Boyd	
Sumter		23.141	37.242	23	CR 20 to SR 39 – Gainesville, Epes	
Greene	Boligee	32.229	51.868	32	CR 20 – Boligee, West Greene	
Greene	Eutaw	40.766	65.607	40	SR 14 – Aliceville, Eutaw	
Greene		45.334	72.958	45	CR 208 – Union	
Greene	Knoxville	52.244	84.079	52	US 11 / US 43 (SR 7 / SR 13) – Knoxville	
Tuscaloosa		62.466	100.529	62	SR 300 – Fosters	
Tuscaloosa		68.033	109.489	68	Joe Mallisham Parkway	
Tuscaloosa	Tuscaloosa	71.367	114.854	71	I-359 / SR 69 (US 11 / SR 7) – Tuscaloosa, Moundville	Exit 0 on I-359 southbound; signed as exits 71A (SR 69 south) & 71B (I-359/SR 69 north); southern terminus of I-359; parclo interchange
Tuscaloosa	Tuscaloosa	73.003	117.487	73	US 82 / SR 6 (McFarland Boulevard)	Luther Stancel Pate III Memorial Bridge
Tuscaloosa	Tuscaloosa	75.961	122.247	76	US 11 / SR 7 (Skyland Boulevard)	
Tuscaloosa	Tuscaloosa	77.102	124.084	77	Buttermilk Road	Formerly signed for Cottondale
Tuscaloosa	Tuscaloosa	79.895	128.579	79	US 11 (SR 7) – Coaling, Cottondale	
Tuscaloosa	Tuscaloosa	86.295	138.878	86	Brookwood, Vance	
Tuscaloosa	Tuscaloosa	89.253	143.639	89	Mercedes Drive	
Tuscaloosa		97.138	156.328	97	US 11 south / SR 5 south (SR 7 south) – West Blocton, Centreville	South end of US 11/SR 5 concurrency
Tuscaloosa		100.292	161.404	100	SR 216 – Lake View	Eastern terminus of SR 216
Jefferson		104.159	167.628	104	Rock Mountain Lake Road	Access via McAshan Drive
Jefferson	McCalla	106.201	170.914	106	I-459 north – Gadsden, Atlanta, Montgomery Future I-422 north	Exits 0A-B on I-459 southbound; proposed interchange with I-422; southern terminus of I-459; future southern terminus of I-422; trumpet interchange for now
Jefferson	Bessemer	108.396	174.446	108	US 11 north / SR 5 north / SR 7 north (Academy Drive)	North end of US 11/SR 5 concurrency
Jefferson	Bessemer	110.021	177.062	110	Splash Adventure Parkway	
Jefferson	Bessemer	112.341	180.795	112	18th Street / 19th Street	
Jefferson	Brighton	113.280	182.306	113	18th Avenue – Brighton	
Jefferson	Midfield	115.520	185.911	115	Allison–Bonnett Memorial Drive / Jaybird Road	
Jefferson	Fairfield	118.304	190.392	118	Valley Road – Fairfield	
Jefferson	Fairfield	119.025	191.552	119	Lloyd Nolan Parkway	Signed as exit 119A southbound
Jefferson	Ensley	119.727	192.682	119B	Avenue I	Southbound exit and northbound entrance
Jefferson	Ensley	120.934	194.624	120	SR 269 (20th Street Ensley) / Ensley Avenue	Southern terminus of SR 269
Jefferson	Ensley	121.238	195.114	121	Bush Boulevard	Southbound exit and northbound entrance
Jefferson	Birmingham	123.374	198.551	123	US 78 / SR 4 (Arkadelphia Road)	
Jefferson	Birmingham	124.740	200.750	124A	6th Avenue North – Downtown	Eastbound exit only
Jefferson	Birmingham	124.740	200.750	124B-C	I-65 – Montgomery, Huntsville	Signed as exits 124B (south) and 124C (north); I-65 exits 261B-C; hybrid interchange
Jefferson	Birmingham	125.221	201.524	124D	17th Street N. – Downtown	Eastbound exit and westbound entrance
Jefferson	Birmingham	125.639	202.196	125B	22nd Street – Downtown	Closed; was signed as exit 125 westbound
Jefferson	Birmingham	126.239	203.162	126A	US 31 south / US 280 east (SR 3 south) Carraway Boulevard to US 31 north (SR 3 north)	Western terminus of US 280
Jefferson	Birmingham	126.825	204.105	126B	31st Street N. / 25th Street N. – Birmingham–Jefferson Convention Complex	
Jefferson	Birmingham	128.257	206.410	128	SR 79 (Tallapoosa Street)	
Jefferson	Birmingham	129.621	208.605	129	Airport Boulevard	
Jefferson	Birmingham	130.301	209.699	130A	I-59 north – Gadsden	Eastern end of I-59 concurrency; I-59 exit 130
Jefferson	Birmingham	130.571	210.134	130	US 11 / SR 7 (1st Avenue North)	Eastbound exits and westbound entrance; signed as exits 130A (south) and 130B (north)
Jefferson	Birmingham	130.571	210.134	130B	1st Avenue South to US 11 (SR 7)	Westbound exit and eastbound entrance
Jefferson	Birmingham	132.416	213.103	132A	Oporto-Madrid Boulevard	Westbound exit and eastbound entrance via exit 132
Jefferson	Birmingham	132.738	213.621	132B	Montevallo Road	Signed as exit 132 westbound
Jefferson	Irondale	133.847	215.406	133	US 78 (SR 4) / Kilgore Memorial Drive	
Jefferson	Irondale	136.308	219.366	135	Old Leeds Road to US 78 (SR 4)	
Jefferson	Irondale	137.027	220.524	136	I-459 – Montgomery, Tuscaloosa, Gadsden	I-459 exit 29
Jefferson	Leeds	140.108	225.482	140	US 78 (SR 4) – Leeds	
St. Clair	Leeds–Moody line	144.546	232.624	144	US 411 (SR 25) – Leeds, Moody, Odenville	Signed as exits 144A (south) and 144B (north)
St. Clair	Moody	147.300	237.056	147	Moody	Access via Kelley Creek Road
St. Clair		152.140	244.846	152	Cook Springs	
St. Clair	Chulavista	153.733	247.409	153	US 78 west (SR 4 west) – Chula Vista	Western end of US 78/SR 4 concurrency
St. Clair	Pell City	156.564	251.965	156	US 78 east (SR 4 east) – Eden, Pell City, Odenville	Eastern end of US 78/SR 4 concurrency
St. Clair	Pell City	158.817	255.591	158	US 231 (SR 53) – Ashville, Pell City	
St. Clair	Riverside	162.913	262.183	162	US 78 (SR 4) – Riverside, Pell City	
Coosa River		164.748	265.136	Bridge		
Talladega	Lincoln	165.094	265.693	165	CR 207 – Embry, Lincoln	
Talladega	Lincoln	168.108	270.544	168	SR 77 – Talladega, Lincoln	
Talladega		173.124	278.616	173	CR 5 – Eastaboga	
Talladega	Oxford	179.729	289.246	179	SR 202 east – Munford, Coldwater	Western terminus of SR 202
Calhoun	Oxford	185.537	298.593	185	SR 21 (Quintard Drive) – Oxford, Anniston, Jacksonville	
Calhoun	Oxford	188.034	302.611	188	US 431 north (SR 1 north) to US 78 (SR 4) – Oxford, Anniston	Northern end of US 431 concurrency
Calhoun		191.859	308.767	191	US 431 south (SR 1 south) SR 301 north to US 78 (SR 4)	Southern end of US 431 concurrency
Cleburne	Heflin	199.374	320.861	199	SR 9 (Almon Street) – Heflin, Hollis	
Cleburne	Heflin	205.054	330.002	205	SR 46 – Ranburne	
Cleburne	Tallapoosa River	209.312	336.855	Bridge		
Cleburne	Abernathy	210.268	338.394	210	CR 49 – Ranburne, Muscadine	
Cleburne		214.778	345.652		I-20 east (SR 402) – Atlanta	Continuation into Georgia
1.000 mi = 1.609 km; 1.000 km = 0.621 mi: Concurrency terminus; Incomplete access; Unopened

== See also ==
Interstate 20
Previous state: Mississippi	Alabama	Next state: Georgia
