= WLBB (disambiguation) =

WLBB is a radio station (1330 AM) licensed to serve Carrollton, Georgia, United States.

WLBB may also refer to:

- Wiener Lokalbahnen Busbetrieb, an Austrian bus service run by Wiener Lokalbahnen
- UDP-2-acetamido-3-amino-2,3-dideoxy-glucuronate N-acetyltransferase (WlbB), an enzyme
