= WKNG =

WKNG may refer to:

- WKNG-FM, a radio station (89.1 FM) licensed to Heflin, Alabama, United States
- WKNG (AM), a radio station (1060 AM) licensed to Tallapoosa, Georgia, United States
