= WCKS =

- Fruithurst, Alabama; United States
- Broadcast area: Carrollton, Georgia; West Georgia; East Alabama
- Frequency: 102.7 MHz
- Branding: Kiss 102.7

Programming
- Format: Top 40

Ownership
- Owner: Gradick Communications; (WCKS, LLC)
- Sister stations: WBTR-FM, WKNG, WKNG-FM, WLBB, WWGA, WCKA

History
- First air date: 1994
- Call sign meaning: Carrollton's Kiss 102.7

Technical information
- Licensing authority: FCC
- Facility ID: 63409
- Class: A
- ERP: 6,000 watts
- HAAT: 200 meters
- Transmitter coordinates: 33°40′5″N 85°17′9″W

Links
- Public license information: Public file; LMS
- Webcast: Listen Live
- Website: kiss1027.com

WCKS (102.7 FM, "Kiss 102.7") is a radio station licensed to the community of Fruithurst, Alabama, United States, and serving Carrollton, Georgia, as well as West Georgia and East Alabama. The station is owned by Gradick Communications and the broadcast licensee is WCKS, LLC. This is a local and independently owned and operated radio station.

== Programming ==
The station plays a Contemporary Hit Radio music format. It has the slogan of "Your Music Station." Beginning in 2023 the new morning show, "Start Your Day with Jessica Kay" from 6:00am-10am EST can be heard. Paula C. hosts Kiss 102.7 during mid afternoons from 10am-2pm EST. On Saturday you can hear vetted voice talent, Steve Jones, get you through Saturday Mornings. Music from today, the aughts, nineties, and late eights are heard on Kiss 102.7.

This includes but isn't limited to: Ed Sheeran, Justin Timberblake, Taylor Swift, Maroon 5, Pharrell Williams, Train, Shakira, Harry Styles, The Cranberries, and the like.

== History ==
"Kiss 102.7" was established in Carrollton, Georgia, in July 1994. Known by the simple call sign WCKS, the station was forced to use WCKS-FM from 2004 through 2006 when AM radio station WNSI was acquired by the Gradick family and its call sign changed to WCKS. On November 29, 1996, the AM station became WCKA so on December 12, 2006, this FM station was able to resume its WCKS identification.
