= WBPD =

WBPD may refer to:

- UDP-2-acetamido-3-amino-2,3-dideoxy-glucuronate N-acetyltransferase, an enzyme
- Westhampton Beach Police Department
