= Eastwood Mall (disambiguation) =

Eastwood Mall is an indoor shopping center in Niles/ Howland Township, Ohio.

Eastwood Mall may also refer to:

- Eastwood Mall (Birmingham) or Eastwood Village, a now-demolished shopping mall in Birmingham, Alabama
- Algo Centre Mall or Eastwood Mall, a now-collapsed mall in Elliot Lake, Ontario
- Eastwood Mall, a development in Eastwood City By Megaworld Corporation, in, Libis, Quezon City, Philippines
- Eastwood Towne Center, a shopping mall in Lansing, Michigan
