= Alabama State Route 46 =

State highway in Alabama, United States

State Route 46

Route information
- Maintained by ALDOT
- Length: 21.074 mi (33.915 km)

Major junctions
- West end: US 78 in Heflin
- I-20 in Heflin
- East end: SR 166 at Georgia state line east of Ranburne

Location
- Country: United States
- State: Alabama
- Counties: Cleburne

Highway system
- Alabama State Highway System; Interstate; US; State
← US 45	→ SR 47

State Route 46 (SR 46) is a 21.074-mile-long (33.915 km) state highway in Cleburne County in the eastern part of the U.S. state of Alabama. The western terminus of the highway is at an intersection with U.S. Route 78 (US 78) (which also carries the unsigned SR 4) in Heflin. The eastern terminus of the route is at the Georgia state line, east of Ranburne, where the roadway continues as Georgia State Route 166.

From the late 1920s to the mid-to-late-1930s, the highway was designated as US 78S, a divided U.S. highway. When that highway was decommissioned, it was redesignated as US 78 Alt.

== Route description ==
SR 46 begins at an intersection with US 78 (unsigned SR 4) in downtown Heflin. It travels to the east-northeast for approximately 750 feet (230 m) before curving to the east-southeast. During this stretch, the highway is only about two blocks south of Cleburne County Jail. Just before intersecting the eastern terminus of Haley Road, SR 46 curves back to the east-northeast. A short distance later, it curves to the southeast and has a brief due-east routing. Just prior to intersecting Winstead Road, SR 46 curves to the northeast. Almost immediately after intersecting Chapel Hill Road, the highway crosses over Cane Creek; then, it intersects Hale Road and curves back to the southeast. Approximately 0.5 miles (0.80 km) past Happy Hill Cemetery, SR 46 has an interchange with Interstate 20 (I-20) at exit 205. Just past this interchange, the highway leaves the city limits of Heflin. Approximately 1,500 feet (460 m) later, it curves to the south-southeast and then crosses over Johnywady Creek. After that, it curves to the southeast and intersects the western terminus of County Route 62 (CR 62) before a due-south routing change that takes it to the northern terminus of CR 71 before crossing over the Tallapoosa River. The highway then curves to the southwest before beginning a fairly sharp curve back to the southeast. Along this curve, it intersects the eastern terminus of CR 18. After curving to a nearly due-south direction, SR 46 intersects the eastern terminus of CR 42. After a curve to the southeast, the roadway crosses over Verdin Creek; then intersects the southern terminus of CR 43. SR 46 passes the Wise Chapel Cemetery. Slightly to the west of Crumbleys Chapel Cemetery, it curves to the south-southeast and intersects the northern terminus of CR 63. After that, it curves to the east-southeast just before intersecting the northern terminus of CR 10, northeast of Union Hill Cemetery. Approximately 1,000 feet (300 m) past Cleburne Memorial Garden, the highway curves to the southeast. Just before entering the city limits of Ranburne, it crosses over Lost Creek. In town, it passes just south of Ranburne Elementary School and then Ranburne High school. The highway widens to four lanes, with two in each direction and curves to the east-northeast just before intersecting the western terminus of Pollard Street. Just over 400 feet (120 m) after the curve, the highway intersects the southern terminus of CR 49 (Frank Ledbetter Drive). One block later is the northern terminus of CR 68 (Lake Street). Here, SR 46 begins to curve to the northeast. Less than 200 feet (61 m) from 3rd Avenue North, the highway narrows back to two lanes. The highway continues to the northeast, through rural parts of town and leaves the city limits just before reaching the Georgia state line. It is here that SR 46 meets its eastern terminus, and the roadway continues as Georgia State Route 166. The present purpose of SR 46 is to serve as a connecting route between Heflin and communities in western Georgia such as Bowdon and Carrollton. The route travels through rural areas of Cleburne County as it leads into Georgia. SR 46 is not part of the National Highway System, a system of roadways important to the nation's economy, defense, and mobility.

== History ==
Between 1927 and 1934, the route was designated as US 78S, while the present route of US 78 was designated as US 78N. In 1934, US 78S was redesignated as US 78 Alternate. In 1954, US 78S Alternate was redesignated as SR 46.

== Major intersections ==
The entire route is in Cleburne County.

Location	mi	km	Destinations	Notes
Heflin	0.0	0.0	US 78 (SR 4)	Western terminus
Heflin	4.7	7.6	I-20 – Atlanta, Birmingham	I-20 exit 205
Ranburne	21.0	33.8	SR 166 east – Bowdon	Georgia state line
1.000 mi = 1.609 km; 1.000 km = 0.621 mi
