= WKNG-FM =

Radio station in Heflin–Anniston, Alabama

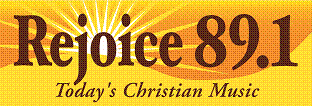
- Heflin, Alabama; United States
- Broadcast area: Anniston, Alabama
- Frequency: 89.1 MHz
- Branding: Rejoice 89.1

Programming
- Format: Contemporary Christian

Ownership
- Owner: Covenant Communications, Inc.
- Sister stations: WBTR-FM, WCKA, WCKF, WCKS-FM, WKNG, WLBB

History
- First air date: October 2005
- Call sign meaning: KNG = "King"

Technical information
- Licensing authority: FCC
- Facility ID: 92876
- Class: A
- ERP: 1,000 watts
- HAAT: 228 meters
- Transmitter coordinates: 33°33′18″N 85°27′25″W

Links
- Public license information: Public file; LMS
- Webcast: Listen Live
- Website: rejoice891.com

WKNG-FM (89.1 FM, "Rejoice 89.1") is a non-commercial educational radio station licensed to serve Heflin, Alabama, United States. It broadcasts a Contemporary Christian format.

The station is licensed to Covenant Communications, Inc. WKNG FM is operated by Gradick Communications LLC which is owned 100% by Steven L. Gradick. Gradick Communications LLC also operates WKNG AM, WCKS FM, WLBB, WBTR-FM, WCKA.

== History ==
More than three years after filing their initial application, this station received its original construction permit from the Federal Communications Commission on May 16, 2002. The new station was assigned the call letters WKNG-FM by the FCC on March 2, 2005. WKNG-FM received its license to cover from the FCC on August 24, 2005.

Rejoice 89.1 started broadcasting a split format of Southern Gospel music during the day and Contemporary Christian music at night when the station signed on in 2005 and kept the format for 10 years. On September 7, 2015 (Labor Day), the format changed to Contemporary Christian.

== The future ==
On April 4, 2006, the FCC granted this station a construction permit to upgrade to a class C3 facility with 1,000 watts of effective radiated power from an antenna placed at a height above average terrain of 254 meters (833 feet).
