= WBTR =

WBTR may refer to:

- KBTR-CD, a television station (channel 36) licensed to Baton Rouge, Louisiana, United States, whose on-air identity is WBTR
- WBTR-FM, a radio station (92.1 FM) licensed to Carrollton, Georgia, United States
