= Abernathy, Alabama =

Unincorporated community in Alabama, United States

- Unincorporated community
- Location within Alabama Location within the United States
- Coordinates: 33°39′02″N 85°24′27″W
- Country: United States
- State: Alabama
- County: Cleburne
- Elevation: 1,024 ft (312 m)
- Time zone: UTC-6 (Central (CST))
  - Summer (DST): UTC-5 (CDT)
- Area code: 256
- GNIS feature ID: 155975

Abernathy is an unincorporated community in Cleburne County, Alabama, United States

== Demographics ==
=== Abernathy Precinct (1880-1950) ===
Abernathy village has never reported a population figure separately on the U.S. Census as an unincorporated community. However, the 8th beat/precinct of Cleburne County bore its name from 1880 to 1950. In the 1930 and 1940 returns, when the census recorded racial statistics for the precincts, both times reported a White majority for the precinct. In 1960, the precincts were merged and/or reorganized into census divisions (as part of a general reorganization of counties) and it was consolidated into the census division of Ranburne.

Historical population
Census	Pop.	Note	%±
1880	1,126		—
1890	1,364		21.1%
1900	1,348		−1.2%
1910	1,421		5.4%
1920	1,683		18.4%
1930	1,422		−15.5%
1940	1,564		10.0%
1950	1,144		−26.9%
U.S. Decennial Census
