= Will Payne (television producer) =

American television producer (born 1974)

- Born: William Owens Payne; March 9, 1974 (age 52); Anniston, Alabama, U.S.
- Occupations: Documentary/TV/Film director producer
- Years active: 1997–present

William "Will" Payne (born March 9, 1974, in Anniston, Alabama) is a producer, writer, and director for television and documentary film. His creative credits include Ten Years of Tomb Raider: A GameTap Retrospective, an expansive look at one of the most successful franchises in videogame history, shot in a dozen cities across five countries.

Payne grew up in Heflin in Cleburne County, Alabama.

While attending Columbia University, Payne played American football.
