= WCKF =

- Ashland, Alabama; United States
- Broadcast area: Clay, Randolph, Talladega, Cleburne, Calhoun, St. Clair, Tallapoosa, Coosa
- Frequency: 100.7 MHz
- Branding: Alabama 100

Programming
- Format: Country
- Affiliations: PRN

Ownership
- Owner: WCKF, LLC

History
- First air date: December 17, 2007

Technical information
- Licensing authority: FCC
- Facility ID: 165962
- Class: A
- ERP: 1,900 watts
- HAAT: 180 meters (591 feet)
- Transmitter coordinates: 33°19′14″N 85°51′39″W

Links
- Public license information: Public file; LMS
- Website: alabama100.com

WCKF (100.7 FM, "Alabama 100") is a radio station licensed to serve Ashland, Alabama. The station is owned L.E. GRADICK, WCKF, LLC.

== Programming ==
WCKF programming includes a tradio program named Trade Line, PRN NASCAR programming, and Alabama Crimson Tide football and basketball.

== History ==
This 100.7 MHz frequency became available after WHMA-FM, an unrelated country formatted station at 100.5 MHz, known as "Alabama 100", moved to Atlanta in early 2001, and WANZ in Northport, Alabama, changed its dial position from 100.7 MHz to 100.5 MHz and began broadcasting from a taller tower near Vance, Alabama, in April 2003.

The new 100.7 MHz station was assigned the WCKF call letters by the Federal Communications Commission on November 28, 2006. WCKF came on the air as a sister station to co-owned WCKA (810 AM) at the end of January 2008. The station received its license to cover from the FCC on January 25, 2008. On May 1, 2010, Alabama 100.7 WCKF, became their own LLC: WCKF, LLC.
