= Riverside, Alabama =

- City
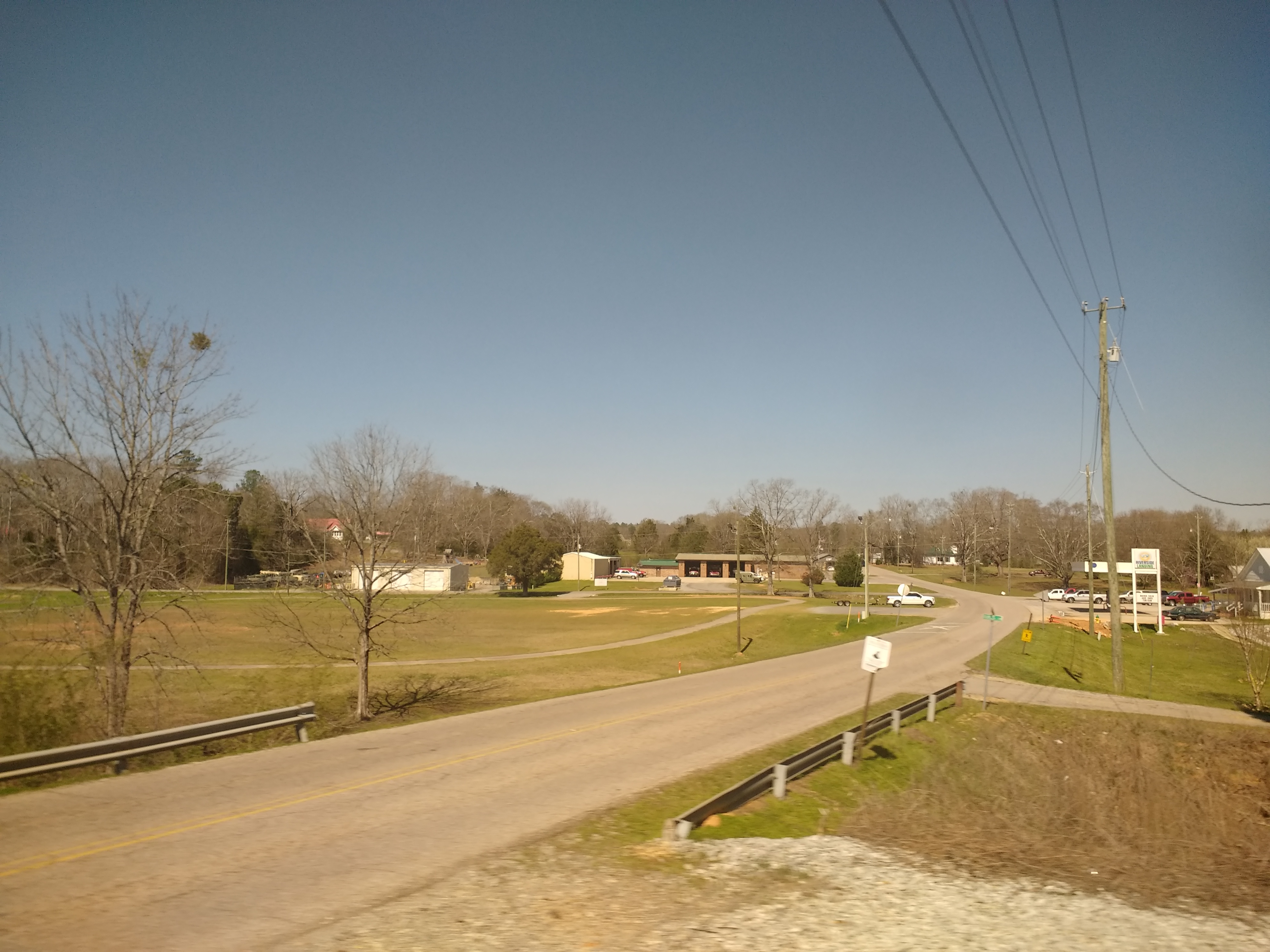
- Entering Riverside

- Location of Riverside in St. Clair County, Alabama.
- Coordinates: 33°37′42″N 86°11′32″W
- Country: United States
- State: Alabama
- County: St. Clair

Area
  - Total: 10.41 sq mi (26.96 km^{2})
  - Land: 8.66 sq mi (22.44 km^{2})
  - Water: 1.74 sq mi (4.51 km^{2})
- Elevation: 525 ft (160 m)

Population (2020)
  - Total: 2,227
  - Density: 257.0/sq mi (99.23/km^{2})
- Time zone: UTC-6 (Central (CST))
  - Summer (DST): UTC-5 (CDT)
- ZIP code: 35135
- Area codes: 205, 659
- FIPS code: 01-64920
- GNIS feature ID: 2407224
- Website: http://www.riverside-al.com/

Riverside is a city in St. Clair County, Alabama, United States. It incorporated in 1886. As of the 2020 census, Riverside had a population of 2,227.

== Geography ==
According to the U.S. Census Bureau, the town has a total area of 10.6 square miles (27 km^{2}), of which 8.9 square miles (23 km^{2}) is land and 1.6 square miles (4.1 km^{2}) (15.42%) is water.

The city is located along the Coosa River just east of Pell City along Interstate 20, which runs west to east through the southern part of the city. Access to the city can be found from exit 162. Via I-20, Birmingham is west 39 mi (63 km), and Atlanta is east 110 mi (177 km). U.S. Route 78 also runs through the city.

== Demographics ==
Historical population
| Census | Pop. | Note | %± |
|---|---|---|---|
| 1900 | 300 | | — |
| 1910 | 277 | | −7.7% |
| 1920 | 240 | | −13.4% |
| 1930 | 131 | | −45.4% |
| 1940 | 135 | | 3.1% |
| 1950 | 116 | | −14.1% |
| 1960 | 159 | | 37.1% |
| 1970 | 351 | | 120.8% |
| 1980 | 849 | | 141.9% |
| 1990 | 1,004 | | 18.3% |
| 2000 | 1,564 | | 55.8% |
| 2010 | 2,208 | | 41.2% |
| 2020 | 2,227 | | 0.9% |
U.S. Decennial Census; 2013 Estimate

=== 2020 census ===
As of the 2020 census, Riverside had a population of 2,227. The median age was 42.4 years. 21.4% of residents were under the age of 18 and 16.6% of residents were 65 years of age or older. For every 100 females there were 97.3 males, and for every 100 females age 18 and over there were 92.5 males age 18 and over.

38.3% of residents lived in urban areas, while 61.7% lived in rural areas.

There were 905 households in Riverside, of which 31.4% had children under the age of 18 living in them. Of all households, 53.3% were married-couple households, 17.7% were households with a male householder and no spouse or partner present, and 22.1% were households with a female householder and no spouse or partner present. About 22.8% of all households were made up of individuals and 8.7% had someone living alone who was 65 years of age or older.

There were 1,024 housing units, of which 11.6% were vacant. The homeowner vacancy rate was 1.5% and the rental vacancy rate was 7.6%.

Riverside racial composition
| Race | Num. | Perc. |
|---|---|---|
| White (non-Hispanic) | 1,800 | 80.83% |
| Black or African American (non-Hispanic) | 257 | 11.54% |
| Native American | 3 | 0.13% |
| Asian | 21 | 0.94% |
| Pacific Islander | 1 | 0.04% |
| Other/Mixed | 92 | 4.13% |
| Hispanic or Latino | 53 | 2.38% |

=== 2010 census ===
At the 2010 census there were 2,208 people, 864 households, and 640 families in the town. The population density was 248.1 inhabitants per square mile (95.8/km^{2}). There were 987 housing units at an average density of 110.9 per square mile (42.8/km^{2}). The racial makeup of the town was 87.5% White, 10.6% Black or African American, 0.2% Native American, 0.7% Asian, 0.1% from other races, and .9% from two or more races. 1.1% of the population were Hispanic or Latino of any race. Of the 864 households 30.6% had children under the age of 18 living with them, 61.0% were married couples living together, 9.3% had a female householder with no husband present, and 25.9% were non-families. 21.9% of households were one person and 7.2% were one person aged 65 or older. The average household size was 2.56 and the average family size was 2.99.

The age distribution was 24.2% under the age of 18, 6.8% from 18 to 24, 27.7% from 25 to 44, 30.2% from 45 to 64, and 11.1% 65 or older. The median age was 39.6 years. For every 100 females, there were 101.8 males. For every 100 females age 18 and over, there were 97.2 males.

The median household income was $59,250 and the median family income was $65,057. Males had a median income of $52,300 versus $31,713 for females. The per capita income for the town was $27,452. About 6.4% of families and 9.0% of the population were below the poverty line, including 14.2% of those under age 18 and 6.0% of those age 65 or over.

=== 2000 census ===
At the 2000 census there were 1,564 people, 663 households, and 464 families in the town. The population density was 174.8 inhabitants per square mile (67.5/km^{2}). There were 793 housing units at an average density of 88.6 per square mile (34.2/km^{2}). The racial makeup of the town was 85.10% White, 12.40% Black or African American, 0.83% Native American, 0.13% Asian, 0.51% from other races, and 1.02% from two or more races. 0.96% of the population were Hispanic or Latino of any race. Of the 663 households 29.3% had children under the age of 18 living with them, 56.7% were married couples living together, 10.7% had a female householder with no husband present, and 29.9% were non-families. 25.9% of households were one person and 8.4% were one person aged 65 or older. The average household size was 2.36 and the average family size was 2.83.

The age distribution was 23.8% under the age of 18, 6.9% from 18 to 24, 30.1% from 25 to 44, 27.8% from 45 to 64, and 11.4% 65 or older. The median age was 38 years. For every 100 females, there were 94.8 males. For every 100 females age 18 and over, there were 89.6 males.

The median household income was $34,813 and the median family income was $43,456. Males had a median income of $32,604 versus $21,920 for females. The per capita income for the town was $18,932. About 10.2% of families and 12.5% of the population were below the poverty line, including 18.0% of those under age 18 and 12.4% of those age 65 or over.
