= WBTR-FM =

WBTR
- Carrollton, Georgia; United States
- Broadcast area: Carrollton, Georgia, West Georgia and East Alabama
- Frequency: 92.1 MHz
- Branding: B-92.1 Country

Programming
- Format: country

Ownership
- Owner: Gradick Communications; (WYAI, LLC)
- Sister stations: WCKS, WKNG, WKNG-FM, WLBB, WCKA, WWGA

History
- First air date: 1964
- Call sign meaning: BeTerRadio 92.1FM

Technical information
- Licensing authority: FCC
- Facility ID: 9118
- Class: A
- ERP: 6,000 watts
- HAAT: 194 meters
- Transmitter coordinates: 33°33′54″N 85°01′2″W

Links
- Public license information: Public file; LMS
- Website: http://www.B92country.com

WBTR-FM (92.1 FM, "B-92.1 Country") is a radio station licensed in the city of Carrollton, Georgia, located west-southwest of Atlanta. The station plays a country music format. WBTR-FM is "Your Radio Home Of The Dawgs & Braves Baseball!" and "Today's Best Country And All Your Favorites". The licensee is WYAI, Inc.

Current notable on-air personalities include "Tex Carter in the Mornings", Michael Vincent (middays), and Steve Jones (afternoons). The station is an affiliate of the Atlanta Braves radio network, and Georgia Football Radio Network.

== History ==
B-92 Country was established in Carrollton, Georgia, in 1964 with a signal strength of 3,000 watts. WBTR-FM is the only FM commercial station licensed to Carrollton, serving west Georgia and east Alabama, including Carroll, Haralson, Heard, Coweta, Douglas, Randolph, and Cleburne counties.

The station was once owned by the Tarkenton family.
