= Heflin, Alabama =

City in Alabama, United States

Heflin
- City
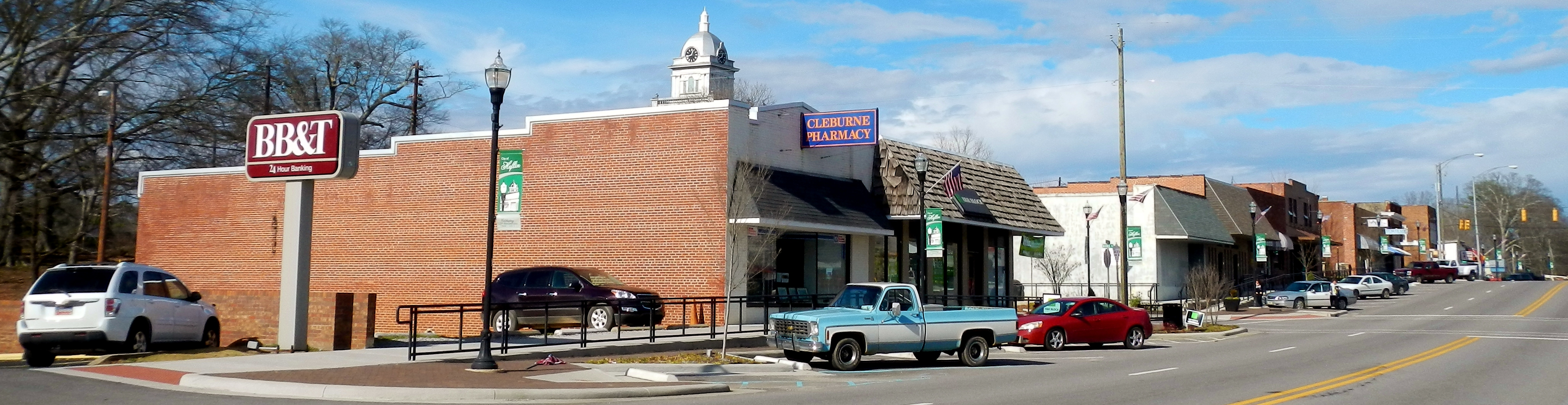
- Heflin, Alabama

- Logo
- Motto: "A Great Place to Call Home."
- Location of Heflin in Cleburne County, Alabama.
- Coordinates: 33°38′30″N 85°34′12″W
- Country: United States
- State: Alabama
- County: Cleburne
- Incorporated: 1886

Government
  - Type: City Council/Mayor

Area
  - Total: 16.31 sq mi (42.23 km^{2})
  - Land: 16.13 sq mi (41.77 km^{2})
  - Water: 0.18 sq mi (0.46 km^{2})
- Elevation: 984 ft (300 m)

Population (2020)
  - Total: 3,431
  - Density: 212.7/sq mi (82.14/km^{2})
- Time zone: UTC−6 (Central (CST))
  - Summer (DST): UTC−5 (CDT)
- ZIP code: 36264
- Area code: 256
- FIPS code: 01-33976
- GNIS feature ID: 2404675
- Website: https://www.cityofheflin.org/

Heflin is a city in and the county seat of Cleburne County, Alabama, United States. At the 2020 census, the population was 3,431. It is located approximately halfway between Birmingham and Atlanta along Interstate 20.

== History ==
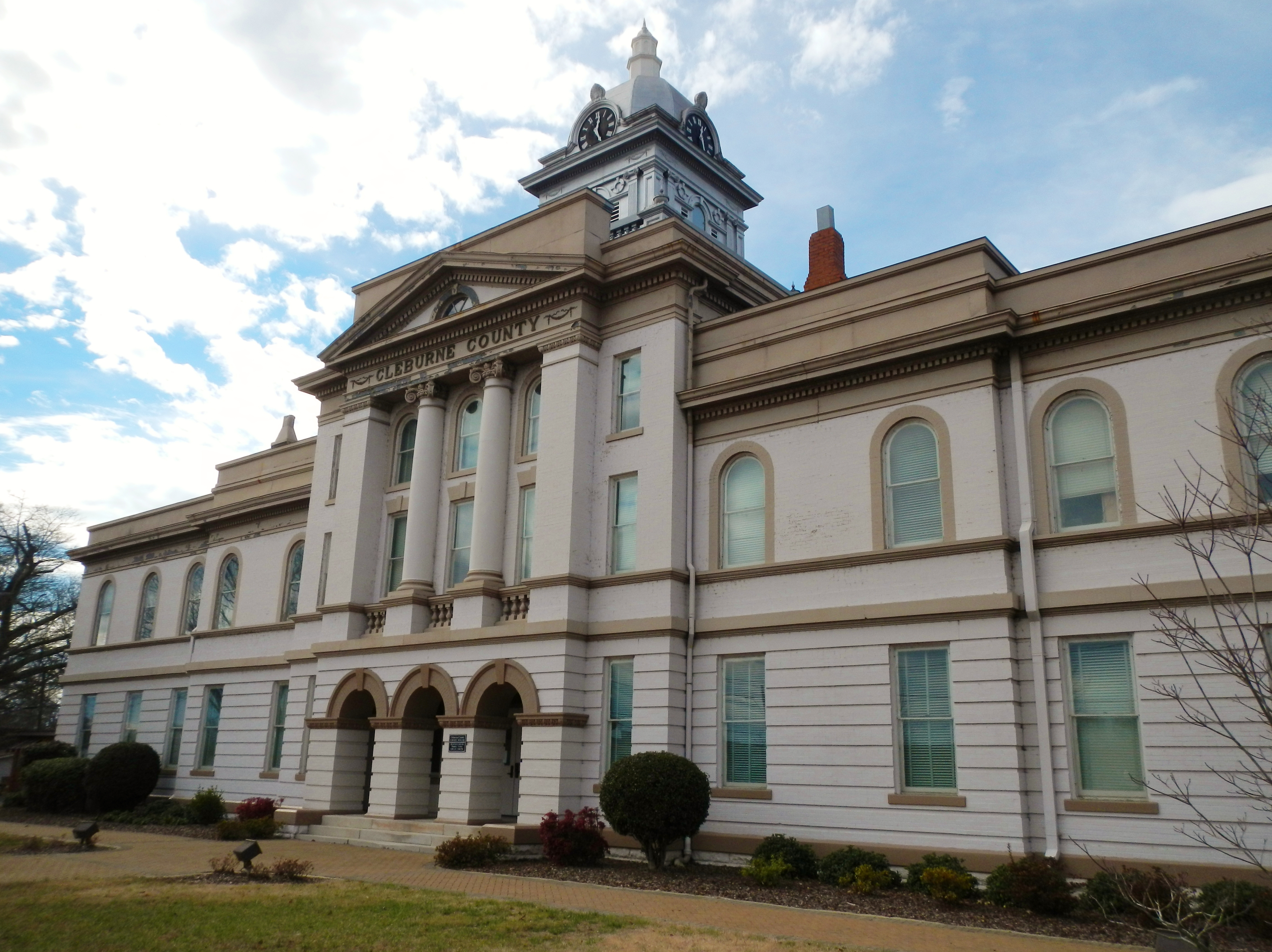
Cleburne County Courthouse in Heflin, January 2012.

Heflin was first settled in 1882 as a station on the railroad line from Atlanta. The town quickly grew and was incorporated in 1886. Until 1905, the County Seat of Cleburne County had been located at Edwardsville. In 1905, an election was held to move the county seat from Edwardsville to Heflin. The election results favored Heflin and were appealed to and upheld by the Alabama Supreme Court on July 1, 1906.

== Geography ==
According to the U.S. Census Bureau, the city has a total area of 12.0 square miles (31 km^{2}), of which 11.8 square miles (31 km^{2}) is land and 0.2 square miles (0.52 km^{2}) (1.50%) is water.

The city is located in the east central part of the state approximately 15 mi west of the Alabama-Georgia state line. Interstate 20 runs west to east through the southern part of the city. Access to the city can be found from exits 199 and 205. Via I-20, Birmingham is 76 mi (122 km) west, and Atlanta is 72 mi (116 km) east. U.S. Route 78 also runs through the city, along with two state routes (Alabama State Route 9 and Alabama State Route 46).

=== Climate ===
Climate data for Heflin, AL (1991–2020 normals, extremes 1956–present)
Month	Jan	Feb	Mar	Apr	May	Jun	Jul	Aug	Sep	Oct	Nov	Dec	Year
Record high °F (°C)	79 (26)	83 (28)	87 (31)	90 (32)	98 (37)	106 (41)	107 (42)	105 (41)	100 (38)	95 (35)	87 (31)	78 (26)	107 (42)
Mean maximum °F (°C)	71.0 (21.7)	73.5 (23.1)	80.7 (27.1)	84.5 (29.2)	88.0 (31.1)	92.3 (33.5)	94.3 (34.6)	93.9 (34.4)	91.2 (32.9)	85.1 (29.5)	78.5 (25.8)	71.7 (22.1)	95.6 (35.3)
Mean daily maximum °F (°C)	53.3 (11.8)	57.6 (14.2)	65.6 (18.7)	73.4 (23.0)	79.9 (26.6)	85.3 (29.6)	88.5 (31.4)	87.9 (31.1)	83.5 (28.6)	74.5 (23.6)	64.0 (17.8)	55.7 (13.2)	72.4 (22.4)
Daily mean °F (°C)	41.5 (5.3)	45.1 (7.3)	52.2 (11.2)	59.6 (15.3)	67.4 (19.7)	74.2 (23.4)	77.7 (25.4)	77.0 (25.0)	71.7 (22.1)	61.2 (16.2)	50.6 (10.3)	44.2 (6.8)	60.2 (15.7)
Mean daily minimum °F (°C)	29.7 (−1.3)	32.6 (0.3)	38.8 (3.8)	45.9 (7.7)	54.9 (12.7)	63.1 (17.3)	66.9 (19.4)	66.1 (18.9)	59.9 (15.5)	47.9 (8.8)	37.3 (2.9)	32.7 (0.4)	48.0 (8.9)
Mean minimum °F (°C)	13.3 (−10.4)	17.5 (−8.1)	23.2 (−4.9)	30.4 (−0.9)	40.1 (4.5)	52.9 (11.6)	59.4 (15.2)	57.9 (14.4)	46.8 (8.2)	32.7 (0.4)	23.2 (−4.9)	19.1 (−7.2)	11.2 (−11.6)
Record low °F (°C)	−4 (−20)	1 (−17)	8 (−13)	22 (−6)	30 (−1)	38 (3)	47 (8)	49 (9)	29 (−2)	21 (−6)	10 (−12)	−10 (−23)	−10 (−23)
Average precipitation inches (mm)	5.58 (142)	5.85 (149)	5.60 (142)	4.83 (123)	4.67 (119)	4.58 (116)	5.39 (137)	4.36 (111)	3.33 (85)	3.36 (85)	4.51 (115)	5.35 (136)	57.41 (1,458)
Average snowfall inches (cm)	0.4 (1.0)	0.1 (0.25)	0.5 (1.3)	0.0 (0.0)	0.0 (0.0)	0.0 (0.0)	0.0 (0.0)	0.0 (0.0)	0.0 (0.0)	0.0 (0.0)	0.0 (0.0)	0.2 (0.51)	1.2 (3.0)
Average precipitation days (≥ 0.01 in)	12.7	12.6	11.2	10.1	9.7	11.2	12.0	10.4	8.0	8.3	8.9	12.7	127.8
Average snowy days (≥ 0.1 in)	0.3	0.2	0.0	0.0	0.0	0.0	0.0	0.0	0.0	0.0	0.0	0.2	0.7
Source: NOAA

== Demographics ==
Historical population
Census	Pop.	Note	%±
1890	383		—
1900	460		20.1%
1910	839		82.4%
1920	1,026		22.3%
1930	1,231		20.0%
1940	1,684		36.8%
1950	1,982		17.7%
1960	2,400		21.1%
1970	2,872		19.7%
1980	2,996		4.3%
1990	2,906		−3.0%
2000	3,002		3.3%
2010	3,480		15.9%
2020	3,431		−1.4%
U.S. Decennial Census; 2013 Estimate

=== Racial and ethnic composition ===
Heflin city, Alabama – Racial and ethnic composition Note: the US Census treats Hispanic/Latino as an ethnic category. This table excludes Latinos from the racial categories and assigns them to a separate category. Hispanics/Latinos may be of any race. Hispanics/Latinos may be of any race. Race and ethnicity were not reported in Alabama for populations under 2,500 in 1980 and under 1,000 in 1990.
Race / Ethnicity (NH = Non-Hispanic)	Pop 1980	Pop 1990	Pop 2000	Pop 2010	Pop 2020	% 1980	% 1990	% 2000	% 2010	% 2020
White alone (NH)	2,629	2,498	2,544	3,000	2,930	87.75%	85.96%	84.74%	86.21%	85.40%
Black or African American alone (NH)	367	400	354	328	302	12.25%	13.76%	11.79%	9.43%	8.80%
Native American or Alaska Native alone (NH)	0	3	7	16	12	0.00%	0.10%	0.23%	0.46%	0.35%
Asian alone (NH)	0	4	10	4	5	0.00%	0.14%	0.33%	0.11%	0.15%
Native Hawaiian or Pacific Islander alone (NH)	x	x	0	1	1	x	x	0.00%	0.03%	0.03%
Other race alone (NH)	0	0	0	1	3	0.00%	0.00%	0.00%	0.03%	0.09%
Mixed race or Multiracial (NH)	x	x	29	47	145	x	x	0.97%	1.35%	4.23%
Hispanic or Latino (any race)	0	1	58	83	33	0.00%	0.03%	1.93%	2.39%	0.96%
Total	2,996	2,906	3,002	3,480	3,431	100.00%	100.00%	100.00%	100.00%	100.00%

=== 2020 census ===
As of the 2020 census, Heflin had a population of 3,431 and 1,400 households, of which 677 were families.

The median age was 42.2 years; 21.9% of residents were under the age of 18 and 20.9% were 65 years of age or older. For every 100 females there were 90.1 males, and for every 100 females age 18 and over there were 85.7 males age 18 and over.

0.0% of residents lived in urban areas, while 100.0% lived in rural areas.

There were 1,400 households in Heflin, of which 29.9% had children under the age of 18 living in them. Of all households, 43.0% were married-couple households, 17.8% were households with a male householder and no spouse or partner present, and 33.4% were households with a female householder and no spouse or partner present. About 34.0% of all households were made up of individuals and 16.2% had someone living alone who was 65 years of age or older.

There were 1,621 housing units, of which 13.6% were vacant. The homeowner vacancy rate was 2.3% and the rental vacancy rate was 7.4%.

=== 2010 census ===
As of the census of 2010, there were 3,480 people in 1,384 households, including 925 families, in the city. The population density was 216.9 inhabitants per square mile (83.7/km^{2}). There were 1,531 housing units at an average density of 93.9 per square mile (36.3/km^{2}). The racial makeup of the city was 87.3% White, 9.4% Black or African American, 0.5% Native American, 0.1% Asian, 1.0% from other races, and 1.6% from two or more races. 2.4% of the population were Hispanic or Latino of any race.

Of the 1,384 households 28.0% had children under the age of 18 living with them, 48.5% were married couples living together, 13.2% had a female householder with no husband present, and 33.2% were non-families. 29.3% of households were one person and 14.4% were one person aged 65 or older. The average household size was 2.39 and the average family size was 2.94.

The age distribution was 22.6% under the age of 18, 8.6% from 18 to 24, 24.9% from 25 to 44, 26.1% from 45 to 64, and 17.8% 65 or older. The median age was 40.5 years. For every 100 females, there were 90.5 males. For every 100 females age 18 and over, there were 97.5 males.

The median household income was $29,821, and the median family income was $37,050. Males had a median income of $41,932 versus $25,714 for females. The per capita income for the city was $16,909. About 15.6% of families and 22.0% of the population were below the poverty line, including 29.5% of those under age 18 and 15.9% of those age 65 or over.

=== 2000 census ===
As of the census of 2000, there were 3,002 people in 1,218 households, including 824 families, in the city. The population density was 254.0 inhabitants per square mile (98.1/km^{2}). There were 1,330 housing units at an average density of 112.5 per square mile (43.4/km^{2}). The racial makeup of the city was 85.88% White, 11.83% Black or African American, 0.23% Native American, 0.33% Asian, 0.77% from other races, and 0.97% from two or more races. 1.93% of the population were Hispanic or Latino of any race.

Of the 1,218 households 28.9% had children under the age of 18 living with them, 52.3% were married couples living together, 11.7% had a female householder with no husband present, and 32.3% were non-families. 29.1% of households were one person and 15.7% were one person aged 65 or older. The average household size was 2.38 and the average family size was 2.94.

The age distribution was 22.4% under the age of 18, 8.5% from 18 to 24, 24.9% from 25 to 44, 25.2% from 45 to 64, and 19.1% 65 or older. The median age was 40 years. For every 100 females, there were 91.1 males. For every 100 females age 18 and over, there were 88.4 males.

The median household income was $28,398 and the median family income was $38,600. Males had a median income of $29,545 versus $20,676 for females. The per capita income for the city was $15,452. About 11.9% of families and 16.3% of the population were below the poverty line, including 27.0% of those under age 18 and 18.4% of those age 65 or over.

== Entertainment ==
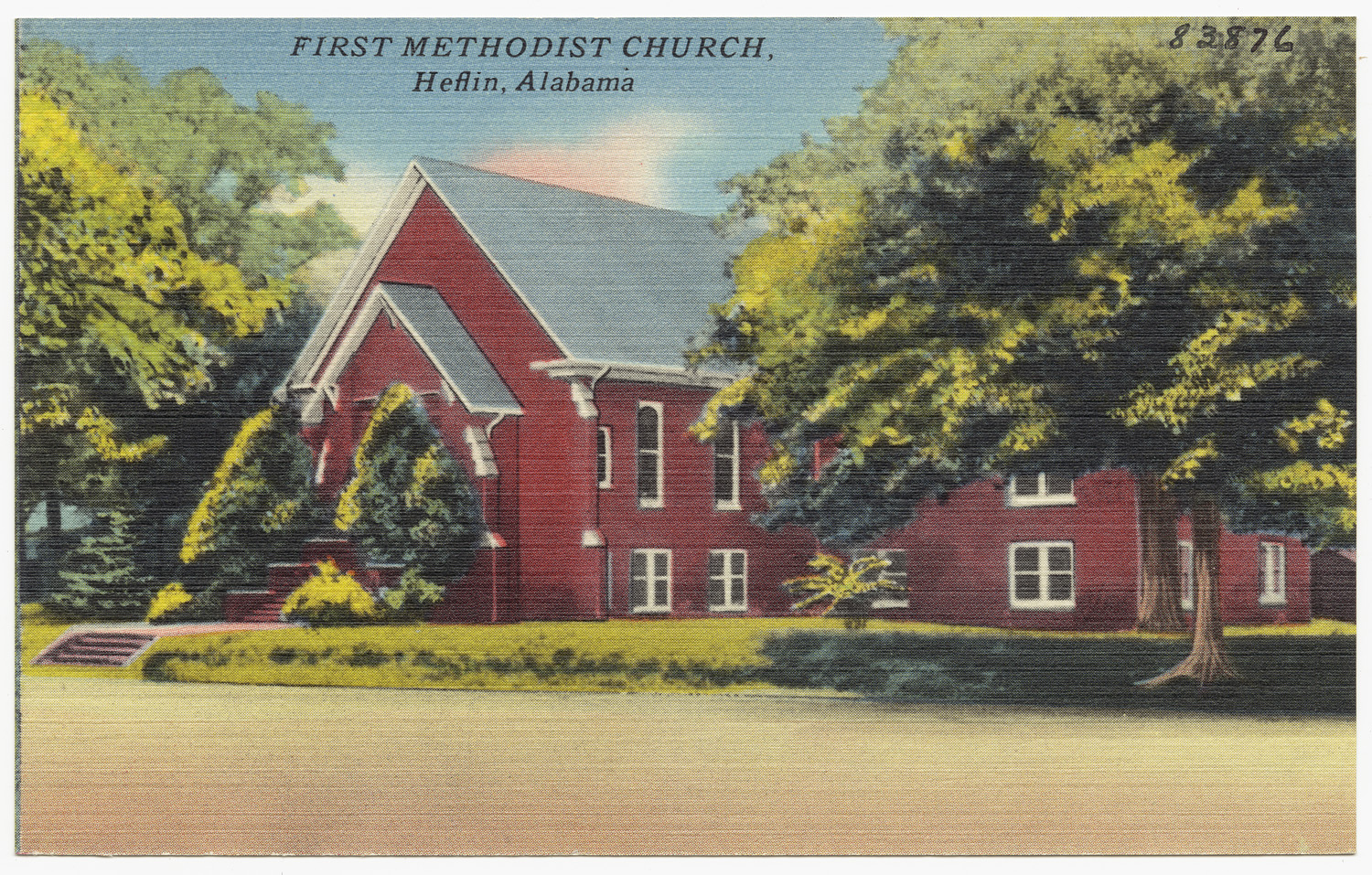
Postcard of First Methodist Church in Heflin (c. 1930-1945)

Heflin is home to the Hollis Speedway.

== Education ==
Public education is provided in Heflin by the Cleburne County School District. Public schools in Heflin include:

Cleburne County High School (grades 8 through 12)
Cleburne County Career Technical School (grades 9 through 12)
Cleburne County Middle School (grades 5 through 7)
Cleburne County Elementary School (grades K through 6)
Pleasant Grove Elementary School (grades K through 6)

== Media ==
- Radio stations

WKNG-FM 89.1 FM (Southern Gospel / Worship Music)
WPIL 91.7 FM (Southern Gospel / Classic Country/Bluegrass)

- Newspaper

Cleburne News (weekly)

- Television

WSB (ABC affiliate) Atlanta
WAGA (FOX affiliate) Atlanta
WBRC (FOX affiliate) Birmingham
WCIQ (PBS affiliate) Mt. Cheaha State Park
WXIA (NBC affiliate) Atlanta
WVTM (NBC affiliate) Birmingham
WGWW-DT2 (ABC affiliate) Anniston
WIAT (CBS affiliate) Birmingham
WUPA (CBS affiliate) Atlanta

== Notable people ==
- Paul D. Adams, a Commanding General of the Third United States Army
- Charlie Brown, former NFL and CFL player
- John Merrill, Secretary of State of Alabama
- Will Payne, producer, writer and director
- Tyrone Prothro, former wide receiver for the University of Alabama
- Chad Robertson, member of the Alabama House of Representatives, resident of Helfin.
