= Eastwood Village =

- Location: Birmingham, Alabama, United States
- Coordinates: 33.53°N 86.72°W
- Opened: 1960 (mall), 2007 (shopping center)
- Closed: 2006 (mall)
- Floors: 1

Eastwood Village, formerly Eastwood Mall, was a shopping mall located in Birmingham, Alabama, United States. Its location was between Montclair Road and Crestwood Boulevard (U.S. Highway 78), adjacent to I-20, between Mountain Brook and Irondale.

When it opened on August 25, 1960, Eastwood Mall was the second enclosed shopping mall in the Southeastern United States, being built after North Carolina's Charlottetown Mall, which opened on October 28, 1959. It remained one of the leading malls in Birmingham for nearly three decades and continued to hold its own into the 1990s.

== History ==
Eastwood Mall was the creation of Newman H. Waters, who owned a chain of drive-in theaters in the Birmingham area, including one adjacent to where Eastwood was built. Eastwood Mall's original tenant list included J.J. Newberry and S.S. Kresge Corporation dime stores, as well as J.C. Penney, a Kroger supermarket, and Colonial Stores supermarket, (which became a Hill's Food Store, and eventually evolved into Winn-Dixie). The mall had no major department stores until the mid-to-late 1960s. Anchors that have been connected to the center over time include the local chains Parisian, Pizitz, and Yielding's, as well as Service Merchandise.

A movie theater opened on Christmas Day 1964 and was equipped to show Cinerama movies such as 2001: A Space Odyssey and Ice Station Zebra. Eastwood Mall Theatre was also the site of the world premiere of the 1976 film Stay Hungry, which was set and filmed in Birmingham.

In 1967, Newman Waters sold Eastwood Mall to Alabama Farm Bureau (today known as ALFA), which owned the property until the mid-1980s. A competing mall, Century Plaza, opened across the street in 1975.

== Decline ==
In 1989, Eastwood Mall received a facelift, adding a food court with a glass atrium and a wall of video screens that made one big image, a Books-A-Million, and a larger space for Parisian. When larger cinemas came into favor, the Eastwood Mall Theatre was closed.

However, the renovations came with a cost. Mismanagement involved with the mall renovations led to overcharged rents, which drove many of Eastwood's old-time tenants out, therefore turning the mall into a virtual dead mall.

Walmart bought the property from Lehman Brothers (the last owner of Eastwood Mall), and demolition of the mall began on June 23, 2006. It was completed about 10 weeks later. A Walmart Supercenter opened on the site on October 22, 2007. This replaced the smaller Walmart in Irondale.

It serves as one of the anchors of what is now called Eastwood Village. Other anchors are: Party City, Ross Dress For Less, Office Depot, and Shoe Carnival. Inside the "Retail Center" entrance of Walmart is a historical tribute to Eastwood Mall that contains a brief history of the mall, as well as several photos. The display was the work of Friends of Eastwood Mall in cooperation with Walmart. Many Eastwood Mall fans, as well as the Friends of Eastwood Mall, hope to see an official historical marker placed on the site of Eastwood Village honoring Eastwood Mall.

As of November 2014, the western portion of the Eastwood Village shopping center has been sold. MAP Eastwood LLC sold the portion of the mall west of the Walmart, along with an out parcel to Eastwood Village Shopping Center LLC for $17 million, according to Jefferson County public records.

The 134,000-square-foot purchase at 1600 Montclair Road did not include the Walmart or anything east of the retail chain.

Phil Sambazis and Thomas Ladt of Sambazis Retail Group in Marcus & Millichap's San Diego office represented the seller. Andrew Chason of the firm's Mobile, Ala. office also provided representation. Zachary Taylor and Don McMinn, vice presidents investments in the firm's Atlanta office, represented the buyer.

Sambazis said the mall is over 90 percent full and in good condition, and the buyer acquired the property as an investment.

T-Mobile and Starbucks occupy the out parcel sold, and Ross Dress for Less, Office Depot, Party City, Tuesday Morning and Shoe Carnival are tenants in the main portion that was acquired.

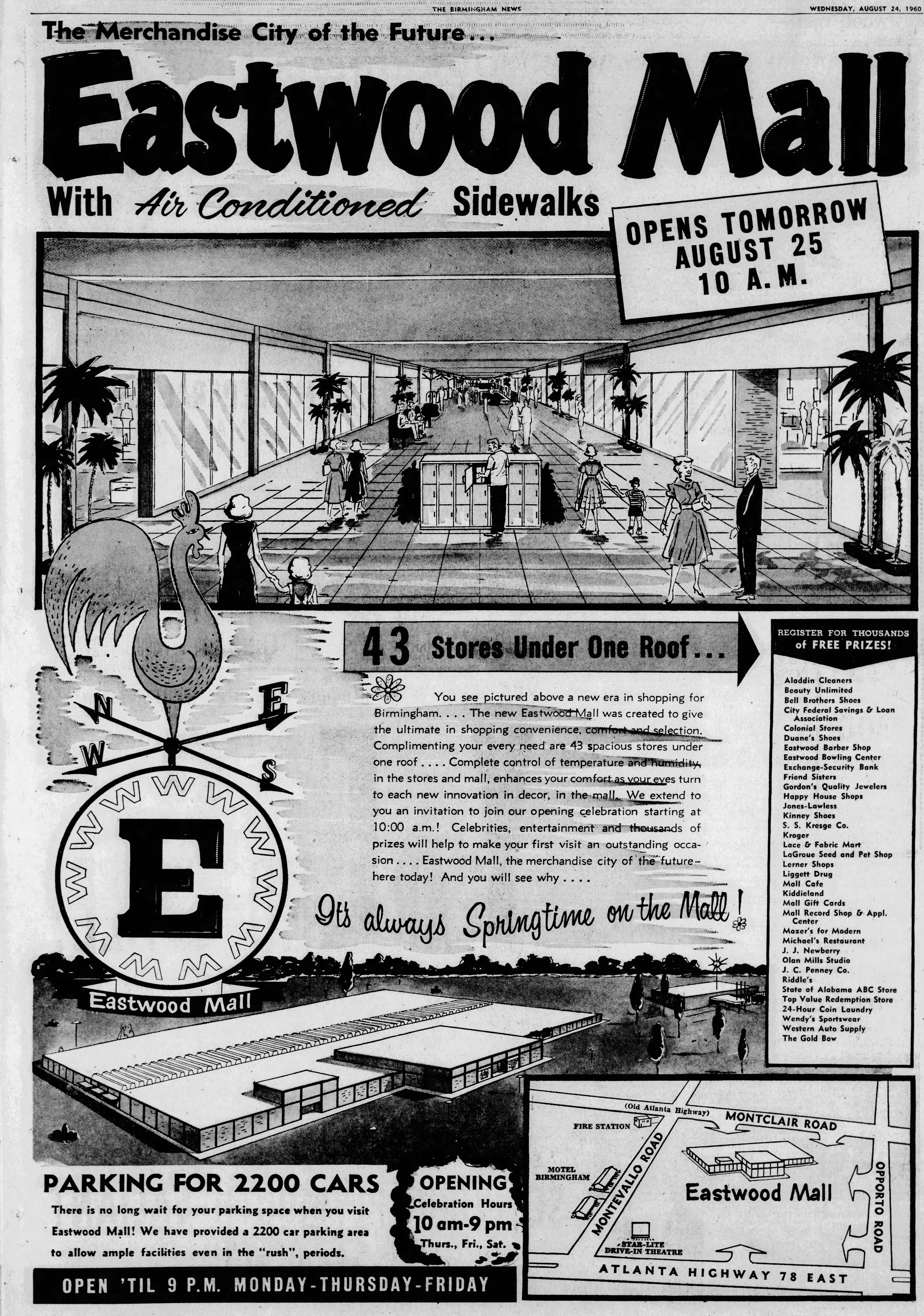
Grand opening ad from August 24th, 1960

== See also ==
- Dead mall
