= WKNG (AM) =

- Tallapoosa, Georgia; United States
- Broadcast area: Atlanta and Birmingham metropolitan areas
- Frequency: 1060 kHz
- Branding: King Country

Programming
- Format: Real Country
- Affiliations: Fox News, Georgia News Network

Ownership
- Owner: Gradick Communications; (WKNG, LLC)
- Sister stations: WBTR-FM, WCKS, WKNG-FM, WLBB

History
- First air date: 1977
- Call sign meaning: WKiNG

Technical information
- Licensing authority: FCC
- Facility ID: 73183
- Class: D
- Power: 15,000 watts day 5,000 watts critical hours
- Transmitter coordinates: 33°44′6.00″N 85°15′8.00″W
- Translator: 93.7 W229CI (Tallapoosa) 101.9 W270AS (Carrollton)

Links
- Public license information: Public file; LMS
- Webcast: Listen Live
- Website: wkng.com

WKNG (branded as King Country) is a daytime operation only AM radio and FM radio station that is located in Tallapoosa, Georgia. The station broadcasts a real country format and focuses on local programming within the West Georgia and East Alabama area. WKNG airs national and world news updates from Salem News, and local news that comes from sister station WLBB. Local programs featured are Tradeline, a show for people to buy, swap, sell, trade or give away items; Petline, for people who are selling, buying, looking for animals, locating a lost animal or finding an animal and wanting to find its owner. Community calendar events are announced every hour along with weather updates.
