= UDP-2-acetamido-3-amino-2,3-dideoxy-glucuronate N-acetyltransferase =

Identifiers
- EC no.: 2.3.1.201

Databases
- IntEnz: IntEnz view
- BRENDA: BRENDA entry
- ExPASy: NiceZyme view
- KEGG: KEGG entry
- MetaCyc: metabolic pathway
- PRIAM: profile
- PDB structures: RCSB PDB PDBe PDBsum
Search
- PMC: articles
- PubMed: articles
- NCBI: proteins

UDP-2-acetamido-3-amino-2,3-dideoxy-glucuronate N-acetyltransferase (EC 2.3.1.201, WbpD, WlbB) is an enzyme with systematic name acetyl-CoA:UDP-2-acetamido-3-amino-2,3-dideoxy-alpha-D-glucuronate N-acetyltransferase. This enzyme catalyses the following chemical reaction

acetyl-CoA + UDP-2-acetamido-3-amino-2,3-dideoxy-alpha-D-glucuronate $\rightleftharpoons$ CoA + UDP-2,3-diacetamido-2,3-dideoxy-alpha-D-glucuronate

This enzyme participates in the biosynthetic pathway for UDP-alpha-D-ManNAc3NAcA (UDP-2,3-diacetamido-2,3-dideoxy-alpha-D-mannuronic acid).
