= WLBB =

Radio station in Carrollton, Georgia

- Carrollton, Georgia; United States
- Broadcast area: West Georgia and Eastern Alabama
- Frequency: 1330 kHz
- Branding: Newstalk 1330/ FM 106.3

Programming
- Format: News Talk Information
- Affiliations: Premiere Networks; SRN News; Westwood One; Atlanta Braves Radio Network

Ownership
- Owner: Gradick Communications; (WYAI, Inc.)
- Sister stations: WBTR-FM, WCKS, WKNG, WKNG-FM

History
- First air date: 1977
- Former call signs: WPPI (1977–1997); WBTR (1997–2001)

Technical information
- Licensing authority: FCC
- Facility ID: 54515
- Class: D
- Power: 1,000 watts day 34 watts night
- Transmitter coordinates: 33°34′17.00″N 85°3′2.00″W
- Translator: 106.3 W292EW (Carrollton)

Links
- Public license information: Public file; LMS
- Website: newstalk1330.com

WLBB (1330 AM, "Newstalk 1330/ FM 106.3") is a radio station broadcasting a News Talk Information format. Licensed to Carrollton, Georgia, United States, it serves the Carrollton area. The station is currently owned by Gradick Communications and licensed to WYAI, Inc. WLBB features programming from Premiere Networks, SRN News, and Westwood One.

The station is an affiliate of the Atlanta Braves radio network and broadcasts syndicated programs that include Glenn Beck, Clay & Buck, Sean Hannity, Mark Levin, Eric Metaxas, Bill O'Reily, and Charlie Kirk .

The local news department is headed up by veteran/ award winning radio journalist Colin E. Worthington, who has been recognized region-wide for bringing listener concerns to light.
