= Ranburne, Alabama =

- Town
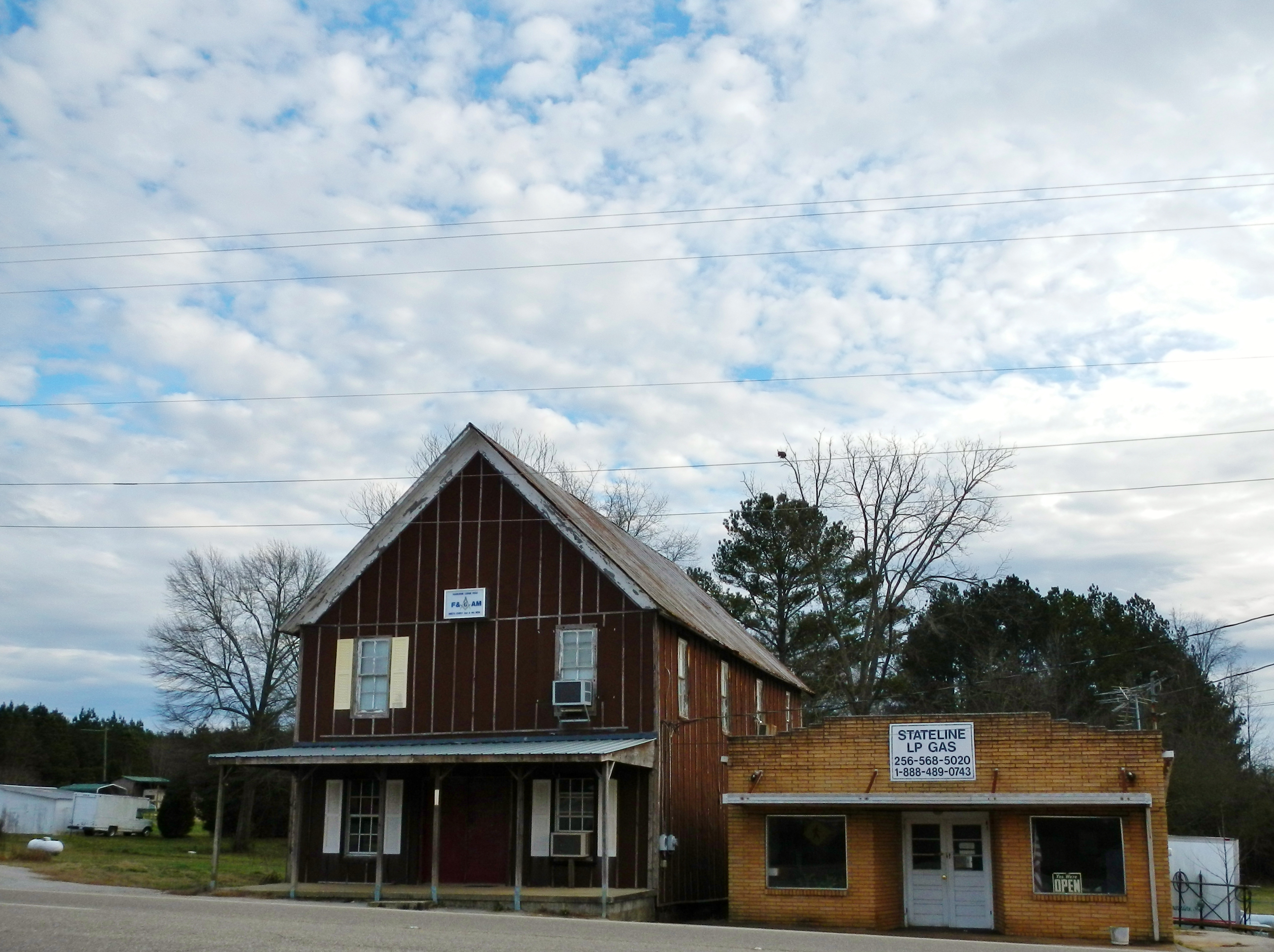
- Ranburne, Alabama

- Location of Ranburne in Cleburne County, Alabama.
- Coordinates: 33°31′33″N 85°20′20″W
- Country: United States
- State: Alabama
- County: Cleburne

Area
  - Total: 1.59 sq mi (4.11 km^{2})
  - Land: 1.59 sq mi (4.11 km^{2})
  - Water: 0 sq mi (0.00 km^{2})
- Elevation: 1,034 ft (315 m)

Population (2020)
  - Total: 422
  - Density: 266.1/sq mi (102.73/km^{2})
- Time zone: UTC-6 (Central (CST))
  - Summer (DST): UTC-5 (CDT)
- ZIP code: 36273
- Area code: 256
- FIPS code: 01-63408
- GNIS feature ID: 2407173
- Website: https://ranburnealabama.com/

Ranburne is a town in Cleburne County, Alabama, United States. At the 2020 census the population was 422.

== Geography ==
Ranburne is located near the southeast corner of Cleburne County.

According to the U.S. Census Bureau, the town has a total area of 1.6 square miles (4.1 km^{2}), all land.

== Demographics ==
Historical population
Census	Pop.	Note	%±
1960	317		—
1970	371		17.0%
1980	417		12.4%
1990	447		7.2%
2000	459		2.7%
2010	409		−10.9%
2020	422		3.2%
U.S. Decennial Census; 2013 Estimate

As of the census of 2000, there were 459 people, 186 households, and 137 families residing in the town. The population density was 289.9 inhabitants per square mile (111.9/km^{2}). There were 211 housing units at an average density of 133.2 per square mile (51.4/km^{2}). The racial makeup of the town was 100.00% White.

There were 186 households, out of which 31.7% had children under the age of 18 living with them, 65.1% were married couples living together, 5.4% had a female householder with no husband present, and 26.3% were non-families. 24.2% of all households were made up of individuals, and 12.4% had someone living alone who was 65 years of age or older. The average household size was 2.47 and the average family size was 2.91.

In the town, the population was spread out, with 23.5% under the age of 18, 6.1% from 18 to 24, 29.0% from 25 to 44, 24.8% from 45 to 64, and 16.6% who were 65 years of age or older. The median age was 38 years. For every 100 females, there were 95.3 males. For every 100 females age 18 and over, there were 93.9 males.

The median income for a household in the town was $31,979, and the median income for a family was $40,250. Males had a median income of $29,167 versus $20,000 for females. The per capita income for the town was $19,708. About 5.6% of families and 7.1% of the population were below the poverty line, including 3.8% of those under age 18 and 17.3% of those age 65 or over.

== Notable people ==
- Ben Buchanan, Currently signed to WWE where he performs on the NXT brand under the ring name Brooks Jensen.
- Chase Whitley, MLB Free Agent pitcher

== Gallery ==
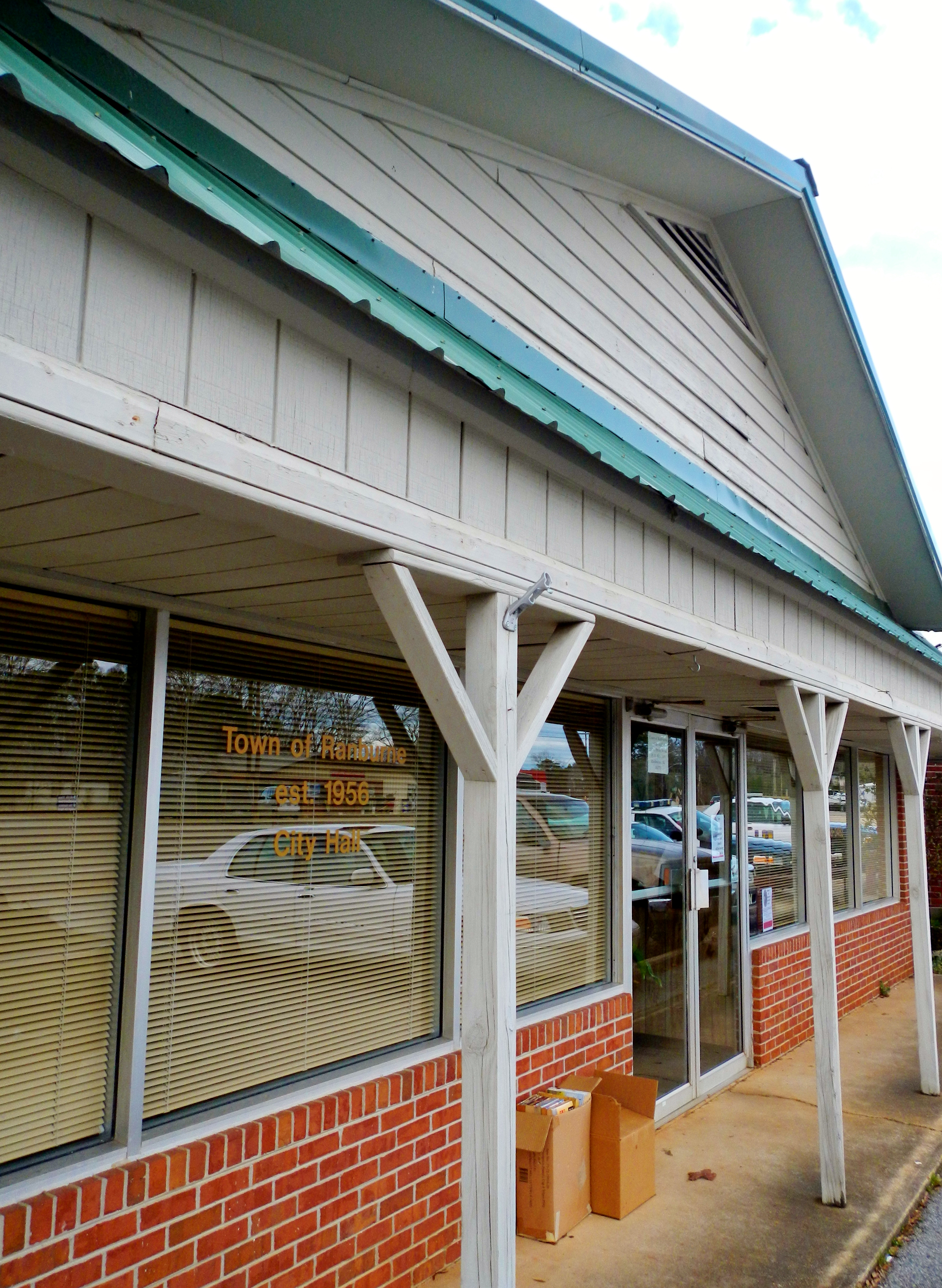
Town of Ranburne City Hall

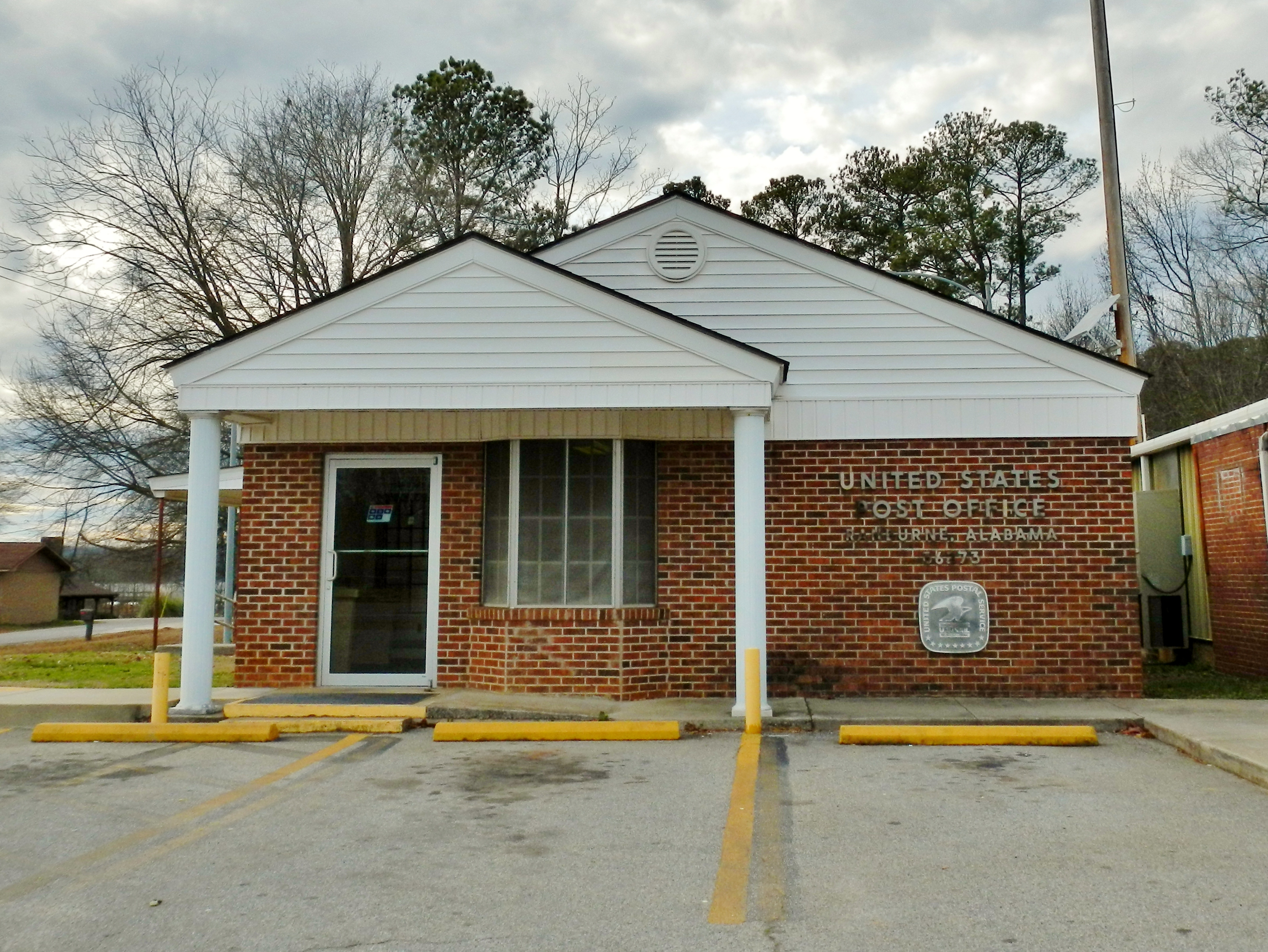
Ranburne Post Office (ZIP code: 36273)

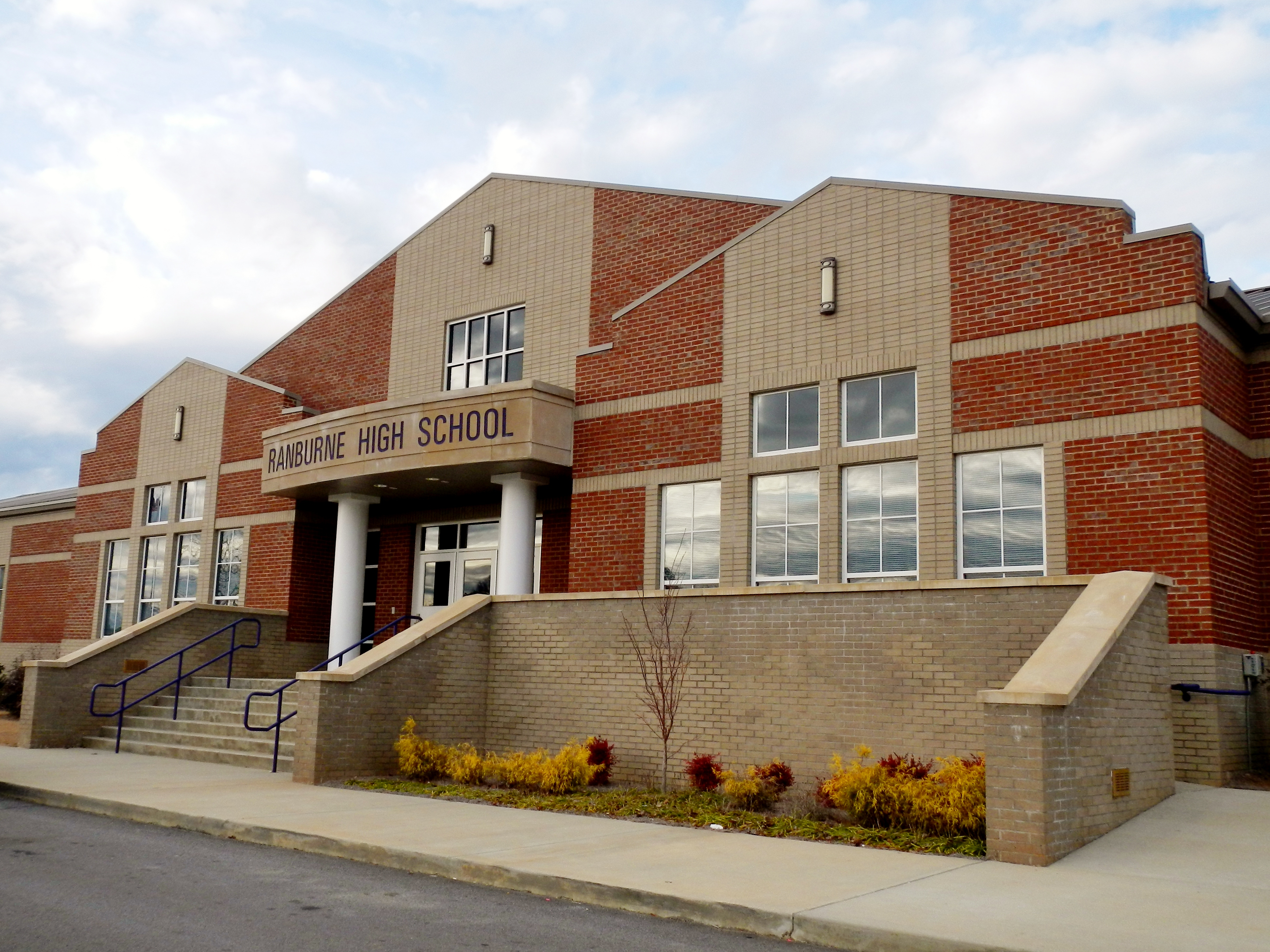
Ranburne High School

== See also ==
- List of towns in Alabama
