= WCKA =

- Jacksonville, Alabama; United States
- Broadcast area: East Alabama/ West Georgia
- Frequency: 810 kHz
- Branding: Real Country WCKA 94.3, 97.1 & am810

Programming
- Format: Country

Ownership
- Owner: Steven L. Gradick; (Alabama 810 LLC)

History
- First air date: March 19, 1987 (as WJXL)
- Former call signs: WJXL (1987–1996); WNSI (1996–2004); WCKS (2004–2006)

Technical information
- Licensing authority: FCC
- Facility ID: 7898
- Class: B
- Power: 50,000 watts day 500 watts night
- Transmitter coordinates: 33°50′58.4″N 85°45′45.9″W
- Translators: 94.3 W232BS (Jacksonville); 97.1 W246DB (Anniston)

Links
- Public license information: Public file; LMS
- Webcast: Listen Live
- Website: wckaradio.com

WCKA (810 AM, "Real Country") is a radio station licensed to serve Jacksonville, Alabama, United States. The station is owned by Steven L. Gradick and licensed to Alabama 810 LLC. It airs a Country music format.

Programming is simulcast on translators W232BS 94.3 FM (Jacksonville) and W246DB 97.1 FM (Anniston).

== Programming ==
Real Country WCKA 94.3, 97.1 & am810 broadcasts a country format 24 hours a day. On air personalities include Brother Rodney and Roger Allen.

== History ==
In March 1988, HMS Broadcasting Company of Jacksonville, Alabama, reached an agreement to sell WJXL to Bussey Hayes Communications, Inc. The deal was approved by the Federal Communications Commission on April 29, 1988, and the transaction was consummated on May 2, 1988.

In July 1995, Bussey Hayes Communications, Inc., reached an agreement to sell WJXL to People's Network Inc. The deal was approved by the FCC on September 12, 1995, and the transaction was consummated on December 21, 1995.

The station's callsign was changed from WJXL to WNSI on January 22, 1996.

In May 1996, People's Network Inc., reached an agreement to sell WNSI to United Broadcasting Network, Inc. The deal was approved by the FCC on July 19, 1996, and after an FCC-approved time extension the transaction was consummated on December 23, 1996.

In October 2003, United Broadcasting Network, Inc. (Ron Gettelfinger, president) reached an agreement to sell WNSI to Steven L. Gradick's Alabama 810, LLC, for a reported sale price of $235,000. The deal was approved by the FCC on November 25, 2003, and the transaction was consummated on November 26, 2003. At the time of the sale, the station broadcast a news/talk format. The new owners of WNSI petitioned the FCC for new call letters and the station was assigned WCKA on February 5, 2004.

Former logo

In December 2005, control of Alabama 810 LLC was transferred from Steven L. Gradick to Leslie E. Gradick. And in 2019 when Leslie E. Gradick passed the station Alabama 810 LLC was transferred back to Steven L. Gradick.
