= 2023 Old Kingston–Lake Martin tornado =

2023 EF3 tornado in Alabama, USA

- The tornado as it tracked through rural portions of northwestern Elmore County, Alabama.

Meteorological history
- Formed: January 12, 2023, 12:40 p.m. CST (UTC−06:00)
- Dissipated: January 12, 2023, 2:08 p.m. CST (UTC−06:00)
- Duration: 1 hour, 28 minutes

EF3 tornado
- on the Enhanced Fujita scale
- Highest winds: 150 mph (240 km/h)

Overall effects
- Casualties: 7 fatalities, 16 injuries
- Damage: Unknown
- Areas affected: Central Alabama, especially Autauga County and Coosa County
- Part of the Tornado outbreak of January 12, 2023 and Tornadoes of 2023

During the afternoon hours of Thursday, January 12, 2023, a large, strong, and deadly EF3 tornado moved through parts of central Alabama, causing severe damage in and around numerous communities. The tornado, known as the Old Kingston-Lake Martin Tornado by the National Weather Service (NWS), tracked 82 miles (132 km) through multiple counties and communities over a time span of 1 hour and 28 minutes, killing seven people and injuring a further 16. The tornado produced damage that was rated mid-range EF3 intensity on the Enhanced Fujita scale by the NWS in Birmingham, Alabama, and was part of an early season, larger single-day tornado outbreak that produced 42 tornadoes in total across the Southeastern United States.

Prior to the Old Kingston-Lake Martin tornado, the parent supercell, having initiated in Louisiana, also produced a high-end EF2 tornado that moved through the southern side of Selma, injuring two people. After the dissipation of the Old Kingston-Lake Martin tornado, another large, high-end EF2 tornado struck the community of Standing Rock before moving into Georgia and passing near Covered Bridge. The supercell produced nine more tornadoes as part of a tornado family in west-central Georgia, including four EF2-rated tornadoes and an extremely large high-end EF3 tornado that moved through parts of Griffin and Experiment. (Note: The tornado reached maximum winds of up to 155 mph (249 km/h), which is typically only considered mid-range, however, the National Weather Service observed during a reanalysis that the tornado was of high-end EF3 strength stating that, "The damage along West Road in particular garnered a slight upgrade in the wind speed to high end EF3 damage per a reanalysis.") The supercell dissipated while still in Georgia.

The tornado began near Independence in Autauga County, initially causing minor damage before rapidly intensifying to EF3 strength and its peak strength as it moved through Old Kingston. Numerous manufactured homes were obliterated, and all 7 fatalities associated with the tornado occurred there. The tornado passed to the east of Browntown, then struck both Oak Grove and the Marbury neighborhood of Wadsworth at EF2 strength. The tornado fluctuated between EF1-EF2 strength as it passed through Elmore County, then reached EF3 strength twice in Coosa County near Speed & Equality as it debarked trees and severely damaged homes. As it continued through Tallapoosa County, the tornado caused EF2 damage in the Lake Martin community of River Bend, damaging numerous residential buildings before moving directly through Sessions at EF1 strength. The tornado then entered Chambers County, causing minor damage near Union Hill before dissipating shortly thereafter near Penton. The tornado was on the ground for 1 hour and 28 minutes over an 82 mile long path.

== Meteorological synopsis ==
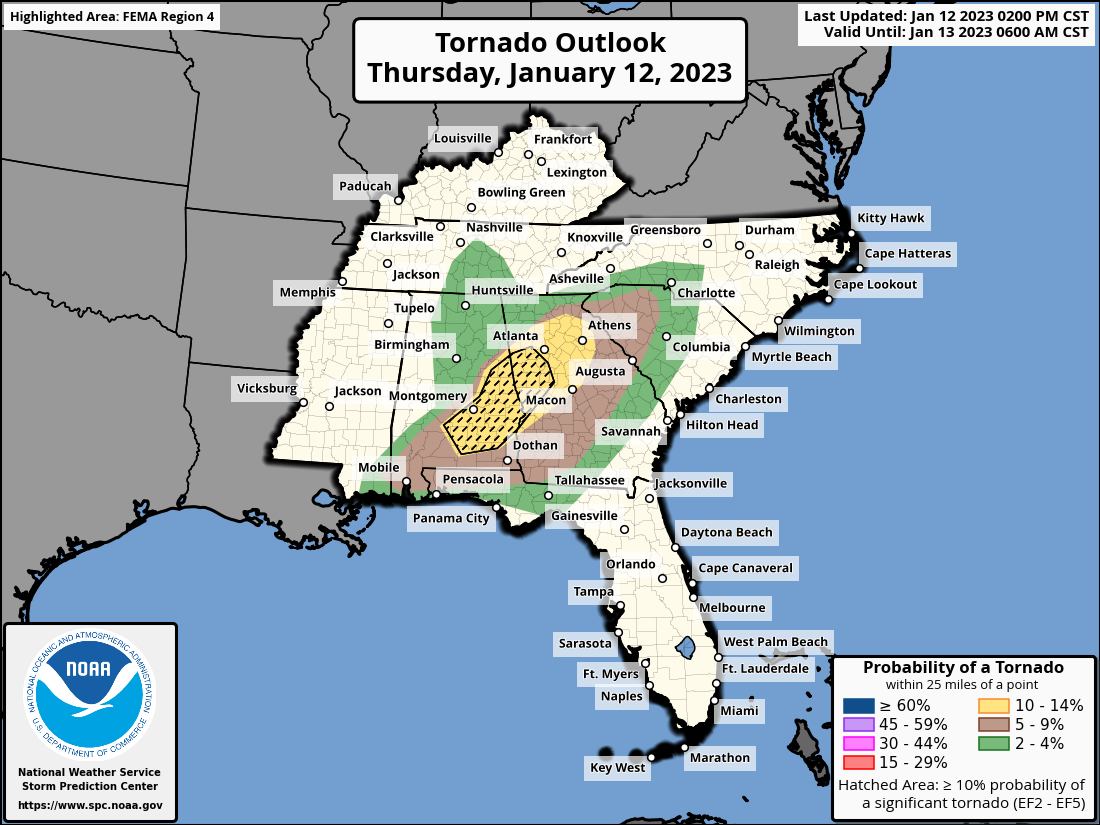
The 20:00 UTC tornado outlook for January 12, 2023. The Old Kingston tornado was nearing dissipation at this time.

One day prior to the event on January 11, the Storm Prediction Center (SPC) denoted a Marginal risk across parts of the Mid-South preceding the overnight and early morning hours. The environment was initially capped, although conditions were expected to become increasingly supportive of severe weather as a mid-level trough approached the region, alongside a moistening airmass. On January 12, the SPC introduced a 0600 UTC Day 1 Enhanced risk over parts of east-central Alabama and north-central Georgia, driven primarily by the risk of damaging winds as the threat of severe weather grew substantially. In the region, numerical weather prediction models indicated the presence of 6.5 C/km mid-level lapse rates and 500-1000 J/kg convective available potential energy (CAPE) values supportive of transient supercells and bowing segments. However, it also found only modest low-level moisture, causing the SPC to outline a large 5% risk for tornadoes over the majority of the lower Tennessee Valley, including the majority of Alabama and Georgia, western Mississippi, southeastern Tennessee, southwestern North Carolina, and northwestern South Carolina.

As the day progressed, advanced potential for tornadic development became apparent along a focused corridor over east-central Alabama and northwestern Georgia. There, effective storm-relative helicity, a measure of the potential for updrafts in supercells, exceeded 300 m^{2}/s^{2}, and CAPE values rose into the 1,000-1,500 J/kg range. Accordingly, the SPC increased their tornado threat to a 10% over the aforementioned areas in their 1300 UTC outlook. However, they did not include the potential of strong tornadoes in the outlook, as the primary threat was still thought to be damaging winds. During the morning hours, a defined line consisting of severe thunderstorms with embedded supercell structures and numerous discrete supercells developed and moved through the highlighted area. Multiple tornadoes, some significant, formed and prompted tornado emergencies for multiple counties as they caused extensive damage. As the day progressed, the SPC hatched part of their 10% risk for tornadoes across east-central Alabama and western Georgia in their 20:00 UTC outlook, outlining the possibility of strong (EF2+) tornadoes. The long-tracked supercell that produced the Old Kingston-Lake Martin tornado tracked from Louisiana to Georgia, producing a total of 12 tornadoes before dissipating during the night hours.

== Tornado summary ==
=== Formation & peak intensity in Autauga County ===
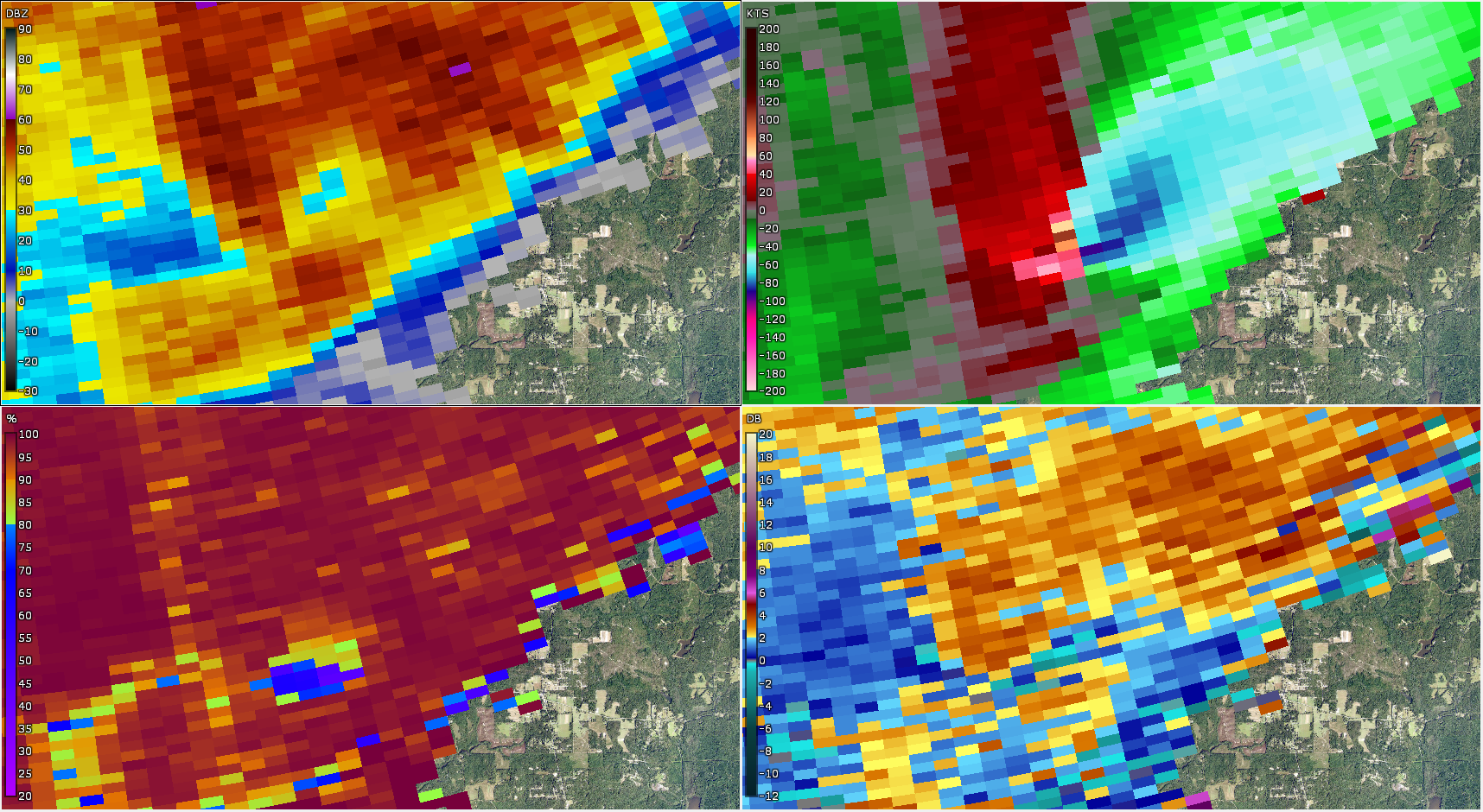
NEXRAD radar scan of the tornado at peak strength in Old Kingston

Nine minutes after producing a high-end EF2 tornado that struck Selma, the parent supercell crossed into Autauga County from Dallas County, and produced a multiple-vortex tornado at 12:40 p.m. CDT, 1.7 miles (2.7 km) to the west of Independence. Moving northeastwards at speeds up to 55 mph through mainly rural areas at EF0 strength, The tornado initially caused minor damage to timber on farms. Crossing US 82 to the south of Joffre, the tornado intensified to EF1 strength, causing severe roof and wall damage to a house, then snapping trees, blowing a shed, and rolling a manufactured home across the adjacent County Road 40. Continuing northeastwards, the tornado entered the community of Old Kingston, which had been struck by an EF0 tornado just nine days prior, and rapidly intensified to low-end EF3 strength as it began to widen substantially along County Road 40 W, blowing away a manufactured home and denuding & partially debarking trees behind the property.

Moving along County Road 43, the tornado further intensified to its peak mid-range EF3 strength. There, at least three manufactured homes were obliterated, their frames stripped bare and thrown up to 100 yards downwind, and a nearby truck was sent airborne for 120 yards, landing with such force that it left a shallow crater in the ground upon its impact. Along the nearby Sandy Ridge Road, the tornado obliterated numerous manufactured homes, both single wide & double wide. The frame of one manufactured home was thrown 250 yards north-northeastwards into an open field, and trees in the area were snapped & partially debarked. A total of five people were killed along Sandy Ridge Road across three separate residences, four from the same family. Just downwind, numerous manufactured homes in a cluster were shredded and thrown considerable distances.

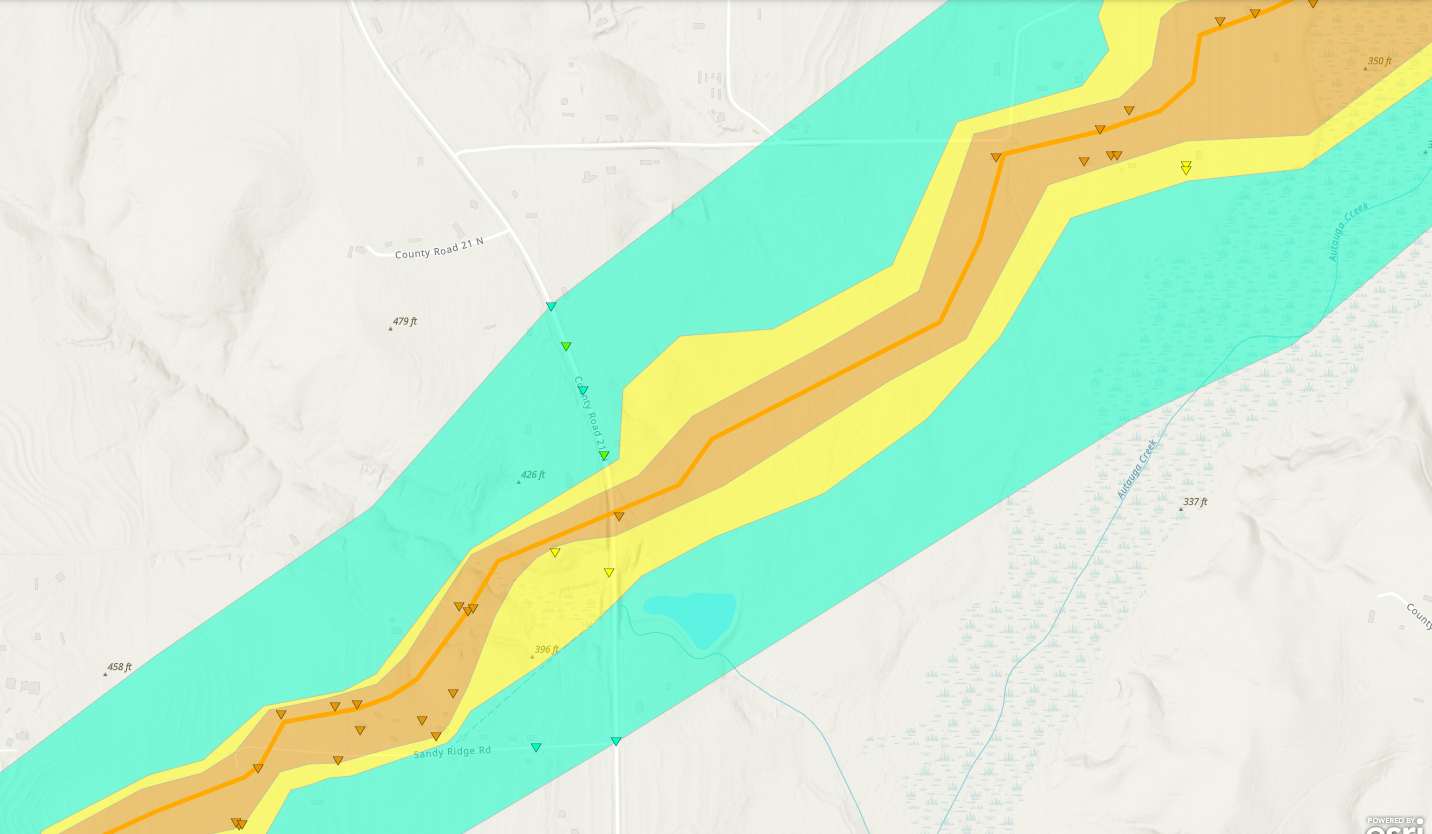
Track and intensity map of the tornado through Old Kingston. Key EF0 65–85 mph EF1 86–110 mph EF2 111–135 mph EF3 136–165 mph

Crossing County Road 21 N, the tornado snapped trees, damaged houses, and damaged metal power poles. Maintaining EF3 strength, the now large tornado struck County Road 140, blowing away at least five manufactured homes and throwing their frames considerable distances. Multiple vehicles were lofted and thrown, including a pickup truck that had its cab separated from the bed by the force of the tornado. Two more fatalities occurred on the eastern end of the road at two adjacent manufactured homes, one of which was anchored and was sucked into the center of the tornado, thrown 80 yards to the north into thick trees with the occupant inside. The other was blown away, similar to many others in the Old Kingston community.

Continuing northeastwards, the tornado narrowed slightly and caused widespread severe tree damage along Autauga Creek and County Road 42 as it snapped, denuded, and debarked numerous hardwood trees. In the three mile stretch of most severe damage wrought by the tornado from County Road 43 to County Road 42, wind speeds reached up to 150 miles per hour (240 km/h). Based on the damage scene and contextual evidence, the National Weather Service in Birmingham stated that it was possible that winds exceeding 150 mph were present in the area. However, with only manufactured homes in the path during its peak strength, which can only be given a maximum rating of EF3 on the Enhanced Fujita scale, there were no damage indicators supportive of a higher rating.

Exiting the Old Kingston community, the tornado followed County Road 57, collapsing the exterior walls of a two-story house on the western side of the road at low-end EF3 strength with winds up to 140 miles per hour (230 km/h) before weakening to mid-range–high-end EF2 strength as it moved directly through Oak Grove. There, softwood trees were snapped, and two homes sustained major damage to their roof systems, one of which was removed entirely. On the adjacent County Road 62, a house had most of its exterior walls collapsed before the tornado briefly weakened back to EF1 strength, snapping & uprooting numerous trees. At around the same time, a strong TVS signature on weather radar prompted a tornado emergency for the northeastern portions of Autauga County.

The tornado approached and crossed I-65 and US 31, veering towards the east-northeast. There, the tornado briefly attained EF2 strength and caused roof damage to several homes in the Pine Level community and rolled a manufactured home off of its foundation onto County Road 68. Just downwind, the tornado uprooted numerous trees in the Pine Flat community before moving through the southern outskirts of Marbury and directly through the neighborhood of Wadsworth. One manufactured home along County Road 68 E was destroyed, hospitalizing an occupant, another house sustained roof damage, and widespread tree damage occurred as many were uprooted and snapped. The tornado removed the roof structure of a home as it intensified to EF2 strength once again near the Elmore County line, causing major roof damage to multiple site-built homes along County Road 68. At around the same time, the Storm Prediction Center issued a mesoscale discussion noting that a "strong to intense" tornado was likely ongoing across Autauga County, and would pose a wind damage threat after its dissipation. The tornado crossed Wolf Creek into Elmore County shortly thereafter, for which another tornado emergency was issued alongside Chilton and Coosa counties.

=== Track in Elmore County & Coosa County ===
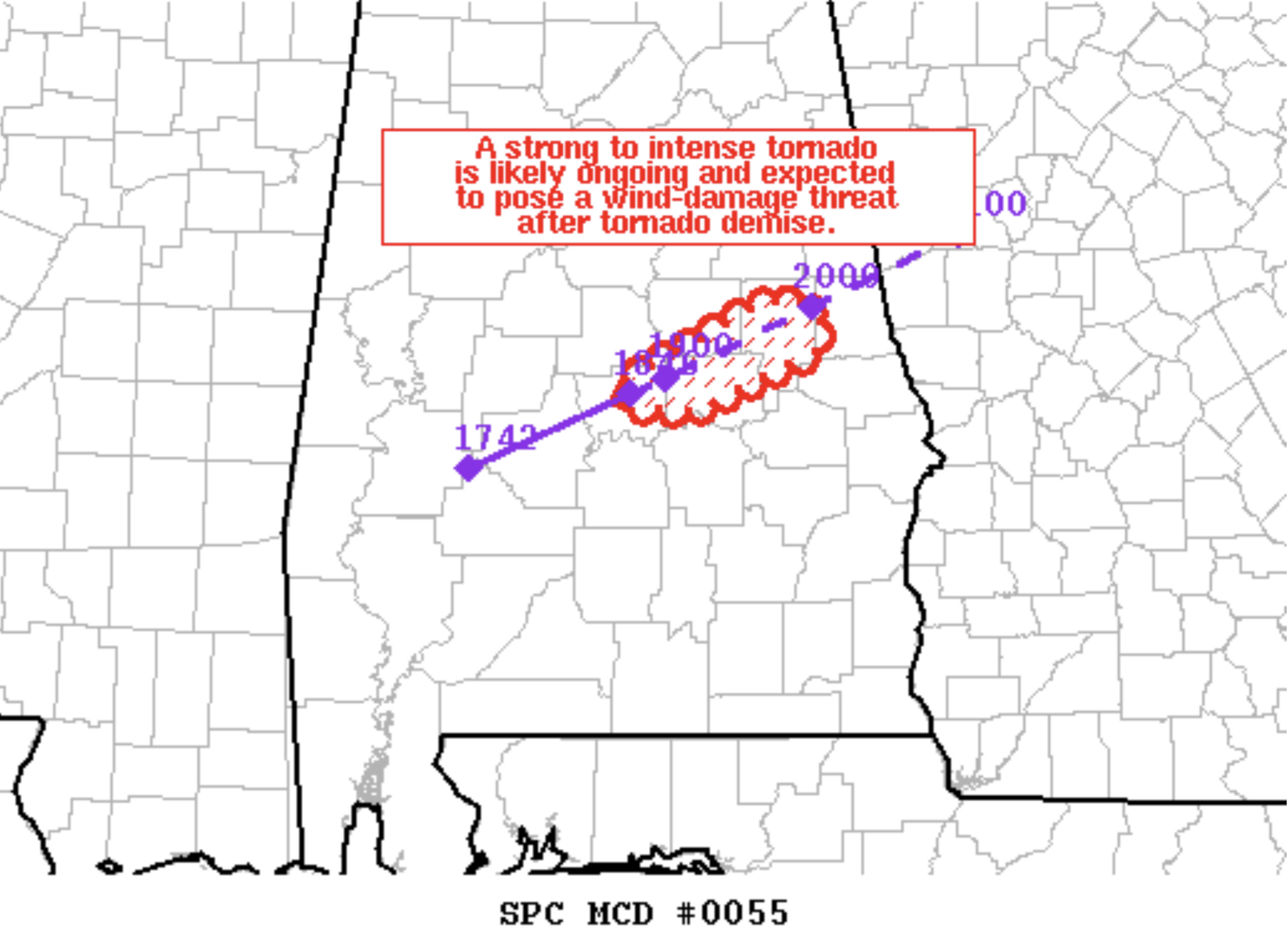
SPC Mesoscale Discussion 55, denoting an ongoing tornado across Autauga County alongside a risk of damaging winds following its dissipation.

Upon entering the northwestern edge of Elmore County, the tornado caused major roof damage to a house on Tram Road before briefly weakening back to EF1 strength, uprooting trees along Johnson Road. Crossing over Trough Creek, the tornado attained EF2 strength once again before throwing a manufactured home into the tree, rolling & destroying another, and removing the majority of the roof structure from a house at the intersection of Lightwood Road and Coosa River Road. Numerous trees in the area were downed as the tornado narrowed in size and approached & crossed the Coosa River, weakening to EF1 strength. There, the tornado struck Neely Road on the west bank and Kelly Road on the east bank, and several homes lost portions of their roofs. Continuing northeastwards, the tornado struck a house along Titus Road/Highway 29, briefly attaining EF2 strength as it removed a significant portion of its roof system. The tornado weakened once again, then regained EF2 strength as it uprooted and snapped numerous pine trees along Grays Ferry Road. Approaching Weoka Creek, the tornado weakened back to EF1 strength, snapping & uprooting trees as it continued through rural, sparsely populated areas of Elmore County. The tornado entered southern Coosa County just to the west of US 231.

Upon entering Coosa County, the tornado regained EF2 strength as it passed to the south of Speed, snapping & uprooting trees and causing minor roof damage to a house. Crossing McKissic Road to the northeast, the tornado briefly intensified to low-end EF3 strength, snapping and partially debarking an extensive swath of pine trees. At the same time, weather radar observations denoted a debris ball from the ongoing tornado. At the intersection of County Roads 14 & 18 northwest of Equality, the tornado continued to cause severe tree damage, removing parts of the roof structure from several homes and flipping cars. A stick-built house along County Road 18 was flattened by the tornado at low-end EF3 intensity, and numerous site-built homes nearby were destroyed. In the area, the tornado reached maximum winds of up to 142 miles per hour (229 km/h). Rapidly weakening to EF1 strength and narrowing in size, the tornado caused roof damage to a manufactured home along SR 9 before continuing through rural areas of Coosa County, snapping and uprooting numerous hardwood & softwood trees. The tornado passed to the south of Fishpond, causing less intense tree damage before entering Tallapoosa County near County Road 54, which had been outlined in a third tornado emergency preceding the tornado's arrival.

=== Track in Tallapoosa County & dissipation in Chambers County ===
The tornado continued to snap & uproot trees upon entering Tallapoosa County, tracking through sparsely populated areas before crossing SR 63 and moving directly through the community of Mount Zion at EF1 strength. There, widespread but lesser tree damage occurred. Continuing northeastwards, the tornado began to widen substantially as it approached and struck the Wind Creek State Park area and crossed Elkahatchee Creek south of Alexander City. The tornado snapped and uprooted numerous trees along Coven Abbett Highway/SR 128, reaching its peak width of 1,500 yards (0.85 mi). Numerous homes sustained damage, some significant as roofs were blown off, boat houses were destroyed, and dozens of large hardwood trees were snapped and uprooted. Along the shore of the Tallapoosa River, the tornado narrowed greatly in size and briefly intensified to EF2 strength for a final time as houses had their roof systems removed and outbuildings were slid or overturned entirely. The tornado crossed the Tallapoosa River along the north side of Lake Martin near the US 280 bridge, then struck the lakeside community of River Bend at high-end EF2 strength. There, the tornado removed the roof & exterior wall of a house and shifted it off of its foundation, and numerous others in the area had their roof structures removed and exterior walls collapsed with winds up to 130 miles per hour (210 km/h). Dozens of trees in the area were blown down, snapped or uprooted by the tornado. The particular damage seen in this area was likely in part to the tornado's interaction with the lake surface, as well as the exposed nature of the houses, as the majority of the structures farther inland appeared to be "sheltered" by surrounding heavily forested areas.

Continuing east-northeastwards, the tornado rapidly but briefly weakened to EF0 strength, snapping and uprooting trees as it passed to the north of Jackson's Gap. Crossing Grimes Ferry Road, the tornado regained EF1 strength, snapping trees before striking Sessions, where trees were downed and an outbuilding lost some of its roof panels. Widespread tree damage and sporadic structural damage continued as the tornado tracked towards the Chambers County border, weakening back to EF0 intensity along Miller Creek. Passing through the northern outskirts of Buttston, the tornado caused minor roof damage to two manufactured homes, shifting slightly to the northeast before turning back to the east-northeast as it regained EF1 strength near the Hampton area, uprooting trees. The tornado followed Anders Cemetery Road and entered Chambers County.

Upon entering Chambers County, the tornado passed to the south of Tillers Crossroads, continuing to cause widespread tree damage as it snapped and uprooted trees. Weakening back to EF0 strength, the tornado began to narrow in size, causing minor damage to outbuildings and trees before dissipating just to the east of Penton and 3.5 miles west-northwest of White Plains at 2:08 p.m. CDT.

The tornado tracked 82.31 miles (132.47 km) across Central Alabama over a timespan of 1 hour and 28 minutes, making it the sixth longest tracked tornado in Alabama history. It reached a peak width of 1,500 yards (0.85 mi) wide. 7 people were killed, all in the Old Kingston community of Autauga County, and a further 16 were injured along the path, 12 severely enough to be brought to hospitals.

== Aftermath ==
=== Damage & recovery efforts ===
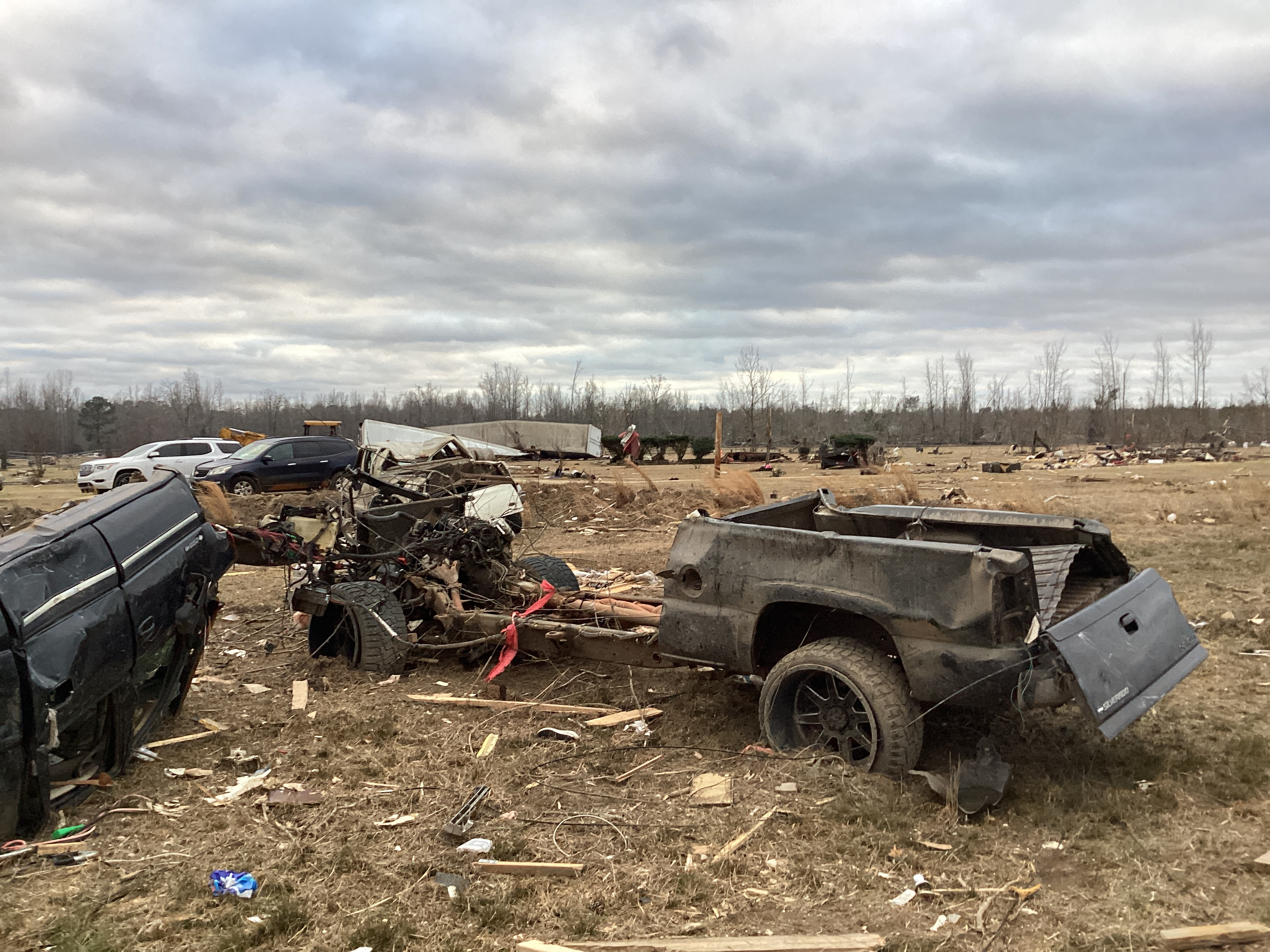
A truck in Old Kingston that had its cab violently ripped out by the force of the tornado.

Immediately following the tornado, an estimated 40 homes were damaged or destroyed in Autauga County; the sheriff's office stated that "hundreds" of homes were damaged or destroyed across the communities of Old Kingston, Posey's Crossroads, White City, and Marbury by January 14. Dozens of manufactured homes were destroyed in Old Kingston alone, one of the hardest hit communities in Autauga County and among the entire path of the tornado. In Marbury, nearly every house along County Road 68 was damaged if not destroyed outright. On January 15, president Joe Biden declared that federal disaster assistance had been made available to Alabama, allowing federal funding to be provided to people affected by the tornado in Autauga County.

FEMA provided over $7.6 million (2023 USD) to Autauga, Coosa, Dallas, Elmore, Greene, Hale, Mobile, Sumter, and Tallapoosa counties. The Central Alabama Community Foundation created the Autauga County Disaster Relief Fund to assist people impacted by the tornado. Additionally, the nearby city of Prattville provided a disaster relief drop-off location, and the Whitewater Camp also located in Prattville opened its doors to tornado survivors. Alabama Power and the Central Alabama Electric Corporation worked to restore power and replace broken power poles & transformers.

=== Casualties ===
The tornado killed seven people, four of which were related, all in manufactured homes within the Old Kingston community. It was the deadliest tornado of the entire outbreak and the third deadliest tornado of 2023, only behind the Bethel Springs–Adamsville, Tennessee tornado on March 31 and the Rolling Fork, Mississippi tornado on March 24. At least 16 other people were injured by the tornado, 12 severely enough to be transported to hospitals by emergency responders.

List of fatalities from the Old Kingston-Lake Martin tornado, all in Old Kingston
Name	Age	Location of death	State	County	Area	Refs.
Robert Gardner Jr	70	Manufactured home	Alabama	Autauga	Sandy Ridge Road	
Deanna Marie Corbin	59	Manufactured home	Alabama	Autauga	Sandy Ridge Road	
Christopher Allen Corbin Jr	46	Manufactured home	Alabama	Autauga	Sandy Ridge Road	
Tessa Celeste Desmet	21	Manufactured home	Alabama	Autauga	Sandy Ridge Road	
Carmen Cox Autery	59	Manufactured home	Alabama	Autauga	Sandy Ridge Road	
Andrea Sue Taylor	61	Manufactured home	Alabama	Autauga	County Road 140	
Solomon Antonio Smith	50	Manufactured home	Alabama	Autauga	County Road 140	

== See also ==
- Tornadoes in Alabama
- Tornadoes of 2023
- List of F3, EF3, and IF3 tornadoes (2020–present)
