= Mordellistena indistincta =

Scientific classification
- Domain: Eukaryota
- Kingdom: Animalia
- Phylum: Arthropoda
- Class: Insecta
- Order: Coleoptera
- Suborder: Polyphaga
- Infraorder: Cucujiformia
- Family: Mordellidae
- Genus: Mordellistena
- Species: M. indistincta

Binomial name
- Mordellistena indistincta Smith, 1862

Species of beetle

Mordellistena indistincta is a species of beetle in the family Mordellidae. It is in the genus Mordellistena. It was discovered in 1882, and is found in New York.
