= Amplirhagada =

Scientific classification
- Kingdom: Animalia
- Phylum: Mollusca
- Class: Gastropoda
- Order: Stylommatophora
- Family: Camaenidae
- Genus: Amplirhagada; Iredale, 1933

Genus of gastropods

Amplirhagada is a genus of air-breathing land snails, terrestrial pulmonate gastropod mollusks in the family Camaenidae. This genus is endemic to the Kimberley region in northwesternmost Western Australia, where it represents the most species-rich genus of land snails.

== Characteristic features ==
Amplirhagada-species exhibit variable shells ranging from broadly conical to highly turreted in shape. Shells are comparatively large, ranging from about 10 to 25 mm in height and from about 15 to 30 mm in diameter. Shells are often banded but uniformly brown species are also known. The umbilicus is narrowly winding and open, partly or completely concealed by the columellar reflection. Typical features of the genital organs comprise presence of penial sheath and penial verge and absence of an epiphallus.

== Species ==
Currently, 56 species are known. These include:

- Amplirhagada alta Solem, 1981
- Amplirhagada anderdonensis Köhler, 2010
- Amplirhagada astuta (Iredale, 1939)
- Amplirhagada basilica Köhler, 2010
- Amplirhagada berthierana Köhler, 2010
- Amplirhagada boongareensis Köhler, 2010
- Amplirhagada buffonensis Köhler, 2010
- Amplirhagada burnerensis (E.A. Smith, 1894)
- Amplirhagada burrowsena Iredale, 1939
- Amplirhagada cambridgensis Solem, 1988
- Amplirhagada camdenensis Köhler, 2010
- Amplirhagada carinata Solem, 1981
- Amplirhagada castra Solem, 1981
- Amplirhagada combeana Iredale, 1938
- Amplirhagada confusa Solem, 1981
- Amplirhagada crystalla (Solem, 1981)
- Amplirhagada decora Köhler, 2010
- Amplirhagada depressa (Solem, 1981)
- Amplirhagada descartesana Köhler, 2010
- Amplirhagada drysdaleana Solem, 1981
- Amplirhagada dubitabile Köhler, 2010
- Amplirhagada elevata Solem, 1981
- Amplirhagada euroa Köhler, 2010
- Amplirhagada gemina Köhler, 2010
- Amplirhagada gibsoni Köhler, 2010
- Amplirhagada herbertena Iredale, 1939
- Amplirhagada imitata (E.A. Smith, 1894)
- Amplirhagada indistincta Köhler, 2010
- Amplirhagada intermedia (Solem, 1981)
- Amplirhagada kalumburuana Solem, 1981
- Amplirhagada katerana Solem, 1981
- Amplirhagada kessneri Köhler, 2010
- Amplirhagada kimberleyana Köhler, 2010
- Amplirhagada lamarckiana Köhler, 2010
- Amplirhagada mckenziei Köhler, 2010
- Amplirhagada mitchelliana Solem, 1981
- Amplirhagada montalevitensis (E.A. Smith, 1894)
- Amplirhagada montesqieuana Köhler, 2010
- Amplirhagada napierana Solem, 1981
- Amplirhagada novelta Iredale, 1939
- Amplirhagada osmondi Solem, 1988
- Amplirhagada percita (Iredale, 1939)
- Amplirhagada ponderi Köhler, 2010
- Amplirhagada puescheli Köhler, 2010
- Amplirhagada pusilla Solem, 1981
- Amplirhagada questroana Solem, 1981
- Amplirhagada regia Köhler, 2010
- Amplirhagada solemiana Köhler, 2010
- Amplirhagada sphaeroidea Köhler, 2010
- Amplirhagada sykesi (E.A. Smith, 1894)
- Amplirhagada tricenaria Köhler, 2010
- Amplirhagada uwinsensis Köhler, 2010
- Amplirhagada varia Solem, 1981
- Amplirhagada wilsoni Solem, 1981
- Amplirhagada yorkensis Köhler, 2010
