= John Shackelford =

John Shackelford may refer to

- John Williams Shackelford (1844–1883), American congressman from North Carolina
- John Shackelford (baseball) (1905–1964), American Negro league baseball player

== See also ==
- Shackelford (disambiguation)
