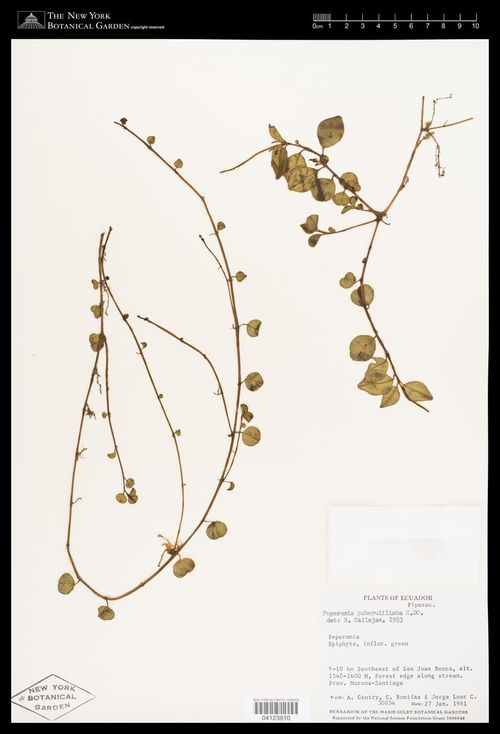

Scientific classification
- Kingdom: Plantae
- Clade: Tracheophytes
- Clade: Angiosperms
- Clade: Magnoliids
- Order: Piperales
- Family: Piperaceae
- Genus: Peperomia
- Species: P. puberulilimba

Binomial name
- Peperomia puberulilimba C. DC.

= Peperomia puberulilimba =

Species of epiphyte

Peperomia puberulilimba is a species of epiphyte in the genus Peperomia that is native to Colombia. It grows on wet tropical biomes. Its conservation status is Threatened.

== Description ==
The type specimen were collected at Santa Marta, Colombia, at an elevation of 5000 feet.

Peperomia puberulilimba has puberulous branchlets, rooting below, with the branchlets apparently erect, with the spike about 15 cm long, about 1 mm thick, flattened when dry. The leaves are alternate with moderate petioles 8–11 mm long, puberulous; the blade is ovate, unequal at the base, subacute at the apex, membranaceous when dry, puberulous on both sides, up to about 17 mm long and 13 mm wide, 3–5-nerved; the peduncle exceeds the petiole, puberulous, 2.5 cm long. The spike is terminal, mature, nearly exceeding the leaf blade, glabrous and sublaxly flowered, nearly 1 mm thick. The bract has an orbicular pelt, pedicellate at the center. The ovary is emergent, ovate, bearing a stigma at the very apex; the stigma is somewhat pilose. The mature berry is supported by a rather long process of the rachis.

== Taxonomy and naming ==
It was described in 1920 by Casimir de Candolle in the Annuaire du Conservatoire et du Jardin botaniques de Genève, from specimens collected by Herbert Huntingdon Smith. The epithet puberulilimba refers to the minutely pubescent leaf blade.

== Distribution and habitat ==
It is native to Colombia. It grows as a epiphyte and is a herb. It grows on wet tropical biomes.

== Conservation ==
This species is assessed as Threatened, in a preliminary report.
