= Bethel Grove =

Bethel Grove may refer to any of three places in the United States:

- Bethel Grove, Autauga County, Alabama
- Bethel Grove, Lauderdale County, Alabama
- Bethel Grove, New York
