= Washington, Alabama =

Ghost town in Autauga County, Alabama

- Ghost town
- Location in Alabama.
- Coordinates: 32°24′29″N 86°27′32″W
- Country: United States
- State: Alabama
- County: Autauga
- Elevation: 121 ft (37 m)
- Time zone: UTC-6 (Central (CST))
  - Summer (DST): UTC-5 (CDT)
- GNIS feature ID: 147664

Washington is a ghost town located in Autauga County, Alabama on the north bank of the Alabama River, just west of the mouth of Autauga Creek. Washington was founded by European American settlers in 1817 on the site of the former Autauga Indian town of Atagi and named in honor of George Washington. On November 22, 1819, the Alabama territorial legislature chose Washington as the county seat of Autauga County, which it remained until 1830. A courthouse, hotel, jail, post office and pillory were constructed to meet the needs of the county government.

Following growth in population, the county seat was moved to Kingston in 1830 in order to be closer to the geographic center of the jurisdiction. Soon after, many businesses and residents followed county businesses. Washington was deserted by 1879. The post office in Washington was operated from 1824 to 1854.

== Notable people ==
- Eugene Allen Smith, former Alabama state geologist and vice president of the Geological Society of America
