= Autauga County Schools =

School district in Alabama

Coordinates: 32°35′5″N 86°28′45″W

Autauga County School System, based in Autauga County, Alabama, has 13 schools and over 9,900 students as of 2007.

The schools are located in the communities of Billingsley, Pine Level, and Marbury, and the cities of Autaugaville and Prattville.

It is the sole school district of Autauga County. The district includes the Autauga County portions of Prattville and Millbrook.

By 2019, Autauga County Schools allowed Maxwell Air Force Base on post families to send their children to their schools. As of 2025 this stipulation applies at some schools and covers any student with a parent or guardian who is stationed at Maxwell AFB, no matter the residence. In August 2019, of the children who are dependents of military families attached to Maxwell AFB who were enrolled in public schools, 30.64% attended Autaga schools.

== Schools ==
Autaugaville

- Autaugaville School Enrollment 521 (Grades K-12) -- closed 2025

Deatsville

- Marbury High School Enrollment 705 (Grades 9–12)

Pine Level

- Pine Level Elementary Enrollment 1,192 (Grades K-5)

Marbury

- Marbury Middle School Enrollment 502 (Grades 6–8)

Billingsley

- Billingsley School Enrollment 749 (Grades K-12)

Prattville

- Autauga County Technology Center
- Daniel Pratt Elementary School (Grades 1–6)
- Prattville Kindergarten School (Grades Pre-K and Kindergarten)
- Prattville Primary School (Grades 1–2)
- Prattville Elementary School (Grades 3–4)
- Prattville Intermediate School (Grades 5–6)
- Prattville Junior High School (Grades 7–8)
- Prattville High School (Grades 9–12)
