= Jones, Alabama =

Unincorporated community in Alabama, United States

- Unincorporated community
- Location within the state of Alabama Jones (the United States)
- Coordinates: 32°35′2″N 86°53′50″W
- Country: United States
- State: Alabama
- County: Autauga
- Elevation: 200 ft (61 m)
- Time zone: UTC-6 (Central (CST))
  - Summer (DST): UTC-5 (CDT)
- ZIP code: 36749
- Area code: 334

Jones, originally Jones Switch, is an unincorporated community in Autauga County, Alabama, United States. The name was officially shortened on May 1, 1903. The community has a post office, with postmasters appointed from 1878 to 2006. The post office also serves unincorporated areas of Autauga County such as Vine Hill, Fremont, Bethel, Salem, Milton, and Fig Tree.

The community was founded in the 19th century and is located along Big Mulberry Creek. A coke oven at Jones continued in operation into the 20th century. Some sources indicate that the Jones community was previously known as Pleasant Valley or Hogg's Mill.

== Geography ==
Mulberry Creek is located to the west and rolling hills are located to the east.

== Emergency services ==
Fire protection is provided by the Jones Volunteer Fire Department.

Emergency Medical Services are provided by Haynes Ambulance.

Law enforcement agency is the Autauga County Sheriffs Office.
