= Deatsville Auxiliary Field =

Coordinates: 32°35′41.00″N 86°26′52″W

Deatsville Auxiliary Field is a former facility of the United States Army Air Forces located near Pine Level, Alabama. Constructed after 1941 as an auxiliary to the nearby Gunter Field, it was turned back into farmland after the war.

== See also ==
- Alabama World War II Army Airfields
- List of airports in Alabama
