= Amplirhagada questroana =

Conservation status
- Endangered (IUCN 2.3)

Scientific classification
- Kingdom: Animalia
- Phylum: Mollusca
- Class: Gastropoda
- Order: Stylommatophora
- Family: Camaenidae
- Genus: Amplirhagada
- Species: A. questroana

Binomial name
- Amplirhagada questroana Solem, 1981

Species of gastropod

Amplirhagada questroana is a species of air-breathing land snail, a terrestrial pulmonate gastropod mollusk in the family Camaenidae. This species is endemic to Australia.
