= Shacklefords =

Shacklefords may refer to:

- Shacklefords, Virginia
- Shacklefords Fork, Virginia
- For the band "The Shacklefords" see Marty Cooper (musician)

== See also ==
- Shackleford (disambiguation)
- Shackelford (disambiguation)
