= Edmund Meredith Shackelford =

Edmund Meredith Shackelford (September 26, 1786 – March 1, 1857) was an American brigadier general.

== Early life ==
Shackelford was born in Hancock County, Georgia, on September 26, 1786. He was one of ten children of John Shackelford (1736–1800), a soldier in the American Revolutionary War, and Frances Wade Butler (1736-unknown). He was a member of the large Roger Shackelford family that immigrated to Virginia before 1678.

Edmund Shackelford married Rebecca Power Brodnax in 1814. The Shackelfords and Brodnaxes were pioneers of Georgia and Alabama. The couple had four children.

Shackelford's home in Autauga County, Alabama, is now known as the community of Kingston, Alabama.

== Career ==
Edmund Shackelford was a 2nd lieutenant in the War of 1812. He served in the Georgia militia from August 23, 1812, through March 6, 1814. He served in Captain William E. Adams' Company of Riflemen in Major William Alexander's Rifle Battalion. On September 19, 1813, he was promoted to Brigade Inspector. In Pickett's History of Alabama on page 559, Shackelford is called a brigadier general. However, his proper rank of lieutenant is reflected in a letter to sisters Ann and Frances, and it is believed the assignation of general is revisionist based upon his later career in the area's Indian conflicts.

Shackelford served under General Andrew Jackson, later 7th President of the United States, at the Battle of New Orleans in January 1815. He continued serving with Jackson in the Indian wars in what was then America's frontier, now Alabama and Florida, including the Battle of Horseshoe Bend and the Battle of Pensacola.

Shackelford moved to Alabama by 1828, by which time he was a general in the Alabama militia. From 1831 to 1837, he was Sheriff of Autauga County, Alabama. During the 1836 Indian Wars along the Chattahoochee River, he worked with Generals Winfield Scott and Thomas Jesup. Notably, when General Scott was recalled to Washington in 1836 due to controversies over his leadership during the 2nd Seminole War, General Shackelford was in charge until General Jesup arrived later in the year to assume command.

In 1845, the year Andrew Jackson died, Shackelford wrote to him as a result of the continuing political controversies surrounding General Winfield Scott's removal from command. As Scott was soon to become the popular hero of the Mexican War, Shackelford's concerns seem justified:

"General Andrew Jackson, Hermitage, Near Nashville, Tennessee.
Nashville, Tennessee
May 30th 1845
General,
You are no doubt aware of the charges made against me for several years
past of having by a course of intrigue obtained the Command of the Army in the
Creek War in 1828 and of having in the same way caused the removal of General Scott
from the command of that army, and also from the direction of affairs in Florida.
These charges I understand have been recently revived. To put them down
I have to appeal to you for a statement of facts as you know them to have existed
at the time, as well in regard to my being placed in Command, as to the removal of
General Scott after he had the command. I therefore respectfully request you to
state whether you did not, yourself, designate me for the Command of the Army
employed against the Creeks without consulting me, and without solicitation on my
part or that of my friends on my behalf.
Whether General Scott was removed by your order from the Command of that Army
as consequence of any influence used or attempted to be used by me, or in consequence
of his own acts, as admitted in his official reports, and which acts you disapproved,
and whether I had any agency in his removal from the direction of affairs in Florida.
I regret, General, this to be compelled to trouble you. With my personal affairs
in the present state of your health, but there is no other recourse left me for the
defense of my reputation against the reiterated of my enemies.
With the highest Consideration
And regards I am,
Your Obliged Servant,
/s/ General SHACKELFORD"

Shackelford died in Leon County, Florida. It is believed he was on one of his plantations there. The body was taken back home by a descendant, and he was buried in Old Town Cemetery, Autauga County, Alabama.
