= Shackleford (disambiguation) =

Shackleford is a village in England.

Shackleford may also refer to:

- Shackleford, Missouri, a community in the United States
- Shackleford (horse) (born 2008), 2011 Preakness Stakes winner

== Surname ==
- Charles Shackleford, (1966–2017), American basketball player
- Dorsey W. Shackleford, (1853–1936), American politician
- James O. Shackleford (1809–1883), associate justice of the Tennessee Supreme Court
- Ken Shackleford, (born 1985), National Football League player
- Lynn Shackelford (born 1947), American basketball player and sports broadcaster
- Michael Shackleford, (born 1965), American mathematician
- Rusty Shackleford, alias of Dale Gribble from King of the Hill
- Thomas M. Shackleford (1859–1927), associate justice of the Florida Supreme Court

== Other ==
- Shackleford Act
- Shackleford Banks
- Shackleford pony, also known as the Banker horse.

== See also ==
- Shackelford (disambiguation)
- Shacklefords (disambiguation)
