= Marbury, Alabama =

- Unincorporated community Census-designated place
- Location of Marbury in Autauga County, Alabama.
- Coordinates: 32°41′05″N 86°29′16″W
- Country: United States
- State: Alabama
- County: Autauga

Area
  - Total: 23.23 sq mi (60.17 km^{2})
  - Land: 23.15 sq mi (59.97 km^{2})
  - Water: 0.077 sq mi (0.20 km^{2})
- Elevation: 453 ft (138 m)

Population (2020)
  - Total: 1,427
  - Density: 62/sq mi (23.8/km^{2})
- Time zone: UTC-6 (Central (CST))
  - Summer (DST): UTC-5 (CDT)
- ZIP code: 36051
- Area code: 334
- FIPS code: 01-46600
- GNIS feature ID: 2582686
- Other name: Bozeman

Marbury is an unincorporated community and census-designated place (CDP) in Autauga County, Alabama, United States. As of the 2020 census, its population was 1,426.

== Demographics ==
Historical population
Census	Pop.	Note	%±
2010	1,418		—
2020	1,427		0.6%
U.S. Decennial Census; 1850-1870 1870-1880; 1890-1910 1920 1930; 1940 1950 1960; 1970 1980 1990; 2000 2010

Marbury first appeared as a census designated place in the 2010 U.S. census.

=== Racial and ethnic composition ===
Marbury CDP, Alabama – Racial and ethnic composition Note: the US Census treats Hispanic/Latino as an ethnic category. This table excludes Latinos from the racial categories and assigns them to a separate category. Hispanics/Latinos may be of any race.
Race / Ethnicity (NH = Non-Hispanic)	Pop 2010	Pop 2020	% 2010	% 2020
White alone (NH)	1,280	1,247	90.27%	87.39%
Black or African American alone (NH)	54	42	3.81%	2.94%
Native American or Alaska Native alone (NH)	2	4	0.14%	0.28%
Asian alone (NH)	0	4	0.00%	0.28%
Native Hawaiian or Pacific Islander alone (NH)	0	0	0.00%	0.00%
Other race alone (NH)	1	1	0.07%	0.07%
Mixed race or Multiracial (NH)	27	77	1.90%	5.40%
Hispanic or Latino (any race)	54	52	3.81%	3.64%
Total	1,418	1,427	100.00%	100.00%

=== 2020 census ===
As of the 2020 census, Marbury had a population of 1,427. The median age was 42.1 years. 23.9% of residents were under the age of 18 and 14.8% were 65 years of age or older. For every 100 females there were 96.6 males, and for every 100 females age 18 and over there were 101.5 males age 18 and over.

0.0% of residents lived in urban areas, while 100.0% lived in rural areas.

There were 545 households in Marbury, of which 33.9% had children under the age of 18 living in them. Of all households, 51.6% were married-couple households, 17.8% were households with a male householder and no spouse or partner present, and 23.5% were households with a female householder and no spouse or partner present. About 21.6% of all households were made up of individuals and 8.8% had someone living alone who was 65 years of age or older.

There were 587 housing units, of which 7.2% were vacant. The homeowner vacancy rate was 0.7% and the rental vacancy rate was 1.6%.

== Education ==
Marbury is served by the Autauga County School System. Marbury High School was located in Marbury, Alabama, although it was turned into a junior high for the 2010-2011 school year. A new Marbury High School has been built just south of Marbury in Deatsville. The new MHS has top-of-the-line technology including laptops and smartboards in every room.

== Emergency Services ==
Fire protection is provided by the Marbury Volunteer Fire Department.

Emergency Medical Services are provided by Haynes Ambulance.

Law enforcement agency is the Autauga County Sheriffs Office.

== Marbury in movies ==
Tim Burton shot a scene in his movie Big Fish at a church in Marbury. The scene is when the main characters father is being buried.

== Notable people ==
- Dewayne White, who played seven seasons in the NFL from 2003 to 2009.
