= Amplirhagada astuta =

Conservation status
- Vulnerable (IUCN 3.1)

Scientific classification
- Kingdom: Animalia
- Phylum: Mollusca
- Class: Gastropoda
- Order: Stylommatophora
- Family: Camaenidae
- Genus: Amplirhagada
- Species: A. astuta

Binomial name
- Amplirhagada astuta Iredale, 1939

Species of mollusc

Amplirhagada astuta is a species of air-breathing land snail, a terrestrial pulmonate gastropod mollusk in the family Camaenidae. This species is endemic to Australia.
