= Billingsley High School =

Location
- 2446 County Road 77; Billingsley, Alabama 36006; United States

Information
- School type: Public
- School district: Autauga County
- CEEB code: 010325
- Principal: Jason Griffin
- Staff: 35.00 (FTE)
- Grades: 9th-12th
- Enrollment: 559 (2021–22)
- Student to teacher ratio: 15.97
- Colors: Black and gold
- Nickname: Bears
- Website: www.bsk12.net

Billingsley School is a grades K-12 school located in Billingsley, Alabama and is part of the Autauga County School District. As of 2022, enrollment is some 559 students. In 1931, the school was destroyed by fire. The building that replaced it housed both high school and elementary school. This building served until the 1990s when it was replaced by a new facility.

Billingsley's mascot is the Bears. From 1985 to 1997 the Bears won 11 Region Championships & played in 4 State Championships. Billingsley won the 1992 1A State Championship over Parrish High School 13-12 & the 1997 1A State Championship over Westbrook Christian Academy 28–8. In 2019, Billingsley hired Phillip Coggins to lead the program. Phillip Coggins was selected the Alabama Football Coaches Association coach of the year in 2018.

- Jason Griffin, Principal
- Janett Skinner, Assistant Principal
