= Pierre Warren =

American gridiron football player (born 1992)

No. 42
- Position: Safety

Personal information
- Born: August 16, 1992 (age 34); Montgomery, Alabama, U.S.
- Listed height: 6 ft 2 in (1.88 m)
- Listed weight: 200 lb (91 kg)

Career information
- High school: Marbury (Deatsville, Alabama)
- College: Jacksonville State
- NFL draft: 2014: undrafted

Career history
- New Orleans Saints (2014)*; Minnesota Vikings (2014)*; New Orleans Saints (2014); Ottawa Redblacks (2016)*
- * Offseason or practice squad member only

Awards and highlights
- First-team All-OVC (2013)

Career NFL statistics
- Total tackles: 30
- Forced fumbles: 1
- Fumble recoveries: 1
- Pass deflections: 4
- Interceptions: 2
- Stats at Pro Football Reference

Pierre Carmelle Warren (born August 16, 1992) is an American former professional football player who was a safety for the New Orleans Saints of the National Football League (NFL). He played college football for the Jacksonville State Gamecocks.

== Early life ==
Warren played high school football at Marbury High School in Deatsville, Alabama. He was a two-time all-metro selection and was an all-county selection as a senior. He was a four-year letterman, three-year starter and helped the Bulldogs advance to the state playoffs. Warren also lettered in basketball, where he was named the team's Most Valuable Player and was an all-area selection.

== College career ==
Warren played for the Gamecocks at Jacksonville State University from 2011 to 2013. He recorded career totals of 166 tackles, a sack, eight interceptions, two interception returns for touchdowns, 29 passes defensed, a forced fumble and five fumble recoveries. He was named First Team All-OVC in 2013.

== Professional career ==
Warren was rated the 12th best free safety in the 2014 NFL draft by NFLDraftScout.com. Nolan Nawrocki of NFL.com predicted that Warren would go undrafted and be a priority free agent. Nawrocki stated that Warren was "At his best in deep zone coverage, but deficient strength, physicality and instincts will turn some teams off, and he does not project as a core special-teams contributor."

Pre-draft measurables
Height	Weight	Arm length	Hand span	40-yard dash	10-yard split	20-yard split	20-yard shuttle	Three-cone drill	Vertical jump	Broad jump	Bench press
6 ft 0 in (1.83 m)	194 lb (88 kg)	33 1/4 in (0.84 m)	9 3/8 in (0.24 m)	4.59 s	1.59 s	2.71 s	4.51 s	7.38 s	35 in (0.89 m)	10 ft 5 in (3.18 m)	8 reps
All values from Jacksonville State Pro Day

Warren signed with the New Orleans Saints on May 12, 2014, after going undrafted in the 2014 NFL draft. He was released by the Saints on August 30 and signed to the team's practice squad on September 2, 2014. He was released again on September 18, 2014.

Warren was signed to the Minnesota Vikings' practice squad on October 7, 2014.

Warren was signed off the Vikings' practice squad by the Saints on November 18, 2014. He made his NFL debut on November 24, 2014, on Monday Night Football, starting against the Baltimore Ravens and recording seven tackles. He recorded his first two career interceptions against the Chicago Bears on December 15, 2014, on Monday Night Football. Warren was released by the Saints on September 5, 2015.

On February 3, 2016, Warren signed a contract with the Ottawa RedBlacks of the Canadian Football League. After participating in the first rookie practice, he informed general manager Marcel Desjardins that he no longer wanted to pursue professional football.

Warren participated in The Spring League in 2017.
