= Dewayne White =

American football player (born 1979)

No. 90, 99
- Position: Defensive end

Personal information
- Born: October 19, 1979 (age 47); Marbury, Alabama, U.S.
- Listed height: 6 ft 2 in (1.88 m)
- Listed weight: 273 lb (124 kg)

Career information
- High school: Marbury
- College: Louisville
- NFL draft: 2003: 2nd round, 64th overall pick

Career history
- Tampa Bay Buccaneers (2003–2006); Detroit Lions (2007–2009); Omaha Nighthawks (2010)

Awards and highlights
- C-USA Defensive Player of the Year (2001); Louisville Cardinals Ring of Honor

Career NFL statistics
- Total tackles: 217
- Sacks: 27
- Forced fumbles: 10
- Fumble recoveries: 11
- Interceptions: 3
- Defensive touchdowns: 2
- Stats at Pro Football Reference

Dewayne White (born October 19, 1979) is an American former professional football player who was a defensive end in the National Football League (NFL). He entered the league as the 64th overall pick in the second round by the Tampa Bay Buccaneers in the 2003 NFL draft. Tied a team record by recording at least half-a-sack in six consecutive games in 2004. During the end of 2005 season he gained notoriety when he blocked a crucial field goal against the Atlanta Falcons, and then scored his first NFL touchdown the following week on a sack and fumble return against the New Orleans Saints. On March 3, 2007, White signed a 5-year, $29 million contract with the Detroit Lions. The Lions released him to free agency on March 8, 2010.
