= Amplirhagada herbertena =

Conservation status
- Data Deficient (IUCN 3.1)

Scientific classification
- Kingdom: Animalia
- Phylum: Mollusca
- Class: Gastropoda
- Order: Stylommatophora
- Family: Camaenidae
- Genus: Amplirhagada
- Species: A. herbertena

Binomial name
- Amplirhagada herbertena Iredale, 1939

Species of land snail

Amplirhagada herbertena is a species of air-breathing land snail, a terrestrial pulmonate gastropod mollusk in the family Camaenidae. This species is endemic to Australia.
