= East Memorial Christian Academy =

- USA

Information
- School type: Private
- School district: Autauga County
- Grades: K-12
- Website: emcawildcats.org

East Memorial Christian Academy (EMCA) was a private K-12 Christian school located in unincorporated Autauga County, Alabama, near Prattville and in the Montgomery metropolitan area. It was founded in 2002.

According to the Montgomery Advertiser, Scott Phillips, a coach who led the school's American football program to its first playoff at the state level in years, was fired because he and his family stopped attending the East Memorial Baptist Church, affiliated with the school. Phillips said that his contract did not have a clause stating that he was required to go to the church.
