= Pine Level, Autauga County, Alabama =

Town in Alabama, United States

Pine Level, Alabama
- Town; Former Census-designated place
- Town of Pine Level
- Seal
- Motto: "A place to call home"
- Coordinates: 32°34′43″N 86°27′42″W
- Country: United States
- State: Alabama
- County: Autauga
- Incorporated: 2023

Government
  - Type: Mayor-council

Area CDP
  - Total: 25.22 sq mi (65.33 km^{2})
  - Land: 25.17 sq mi (65.20 km^{2})
  - Water: 0.050 sq mi (0.13 km^{2})
- Elevation: 561 ft (171 m)

Population (CDP 2020)
  - Total: 4,885
  - Density: 194.0/sq mi (74.92/km^{2})
- Time zone: UTC-6 (Central (CST))
  - Summer (DST): UTC-5 (CDT)
- ZIP code: CDP includes 36067,36066,36022
- Area code: 334
- GNIS feature ID: 2832591
- Website: www.pinelevelal.gov

Pine Level is a town and former census-designated place (CDP) in eastern Autauga County, Alabama, north of Prattville and west of Deatsville. As of the 2010 census, the CDP's population was 4,183. The town is part of the Montgomery Metropolitan Statistical Area.

== Geography ==
The town is located along U.S. Route 31, 18 mi (29 km) northwest of Montgomery and 77 mi (124 km) south of Birmingham, both via I-65. The Town's current boundaries center on the U.S. Route 31 and Autauga County Roads 40 and 107 vicinity.

The Town is located just south of a large (approximately 2 square mile) geographic flat in an otherwise moderately hilly region that gave the area and community its name.

== History ==
From 1941 to 1945, the large flat area adjacent to town was home to the Deatsville Auxiliary Field, an auxiliary Air Corps/Army Air Force pilot training air field associated with Gunter Field in Montgomery, Alabama. After WWII it was converted back to farmland.

The community of Pine Level held a local referendum on September 26, 2023. Of the 300-plus eligible voters in the Pine Level community, 59 voted for incorporation and 43 voted against. The ballots were tallied at the Autauga County Probate Office that evening. The outcome came after more than a year of work and campaigning. Residents who favored incorporation stated that the establishment of a town would help keep tax dollars local and prevent another municipality from annexing Pine Level. A census of the residents located within the town's proposed boundaries was subsequently conducted before municipal elections were ordered to be held on December 5, 2023. On that day, the inaugural mayor and five at-large town council members were elected. Mayor Zachary Bigley and the five council members were all were sworn into office on December 11, 2023.

== Education ==
Pine Level CDP is home to Pine Level Elementary School and Marbury High School, part of the Autauga County School System. Pine Level Elementary School has been annexed into the town. Marbury High School is located outside of the Town's official boundaries.

== Emergency Services ==
Fire protection is provided by the Pine Level Fire Department.

Emergency Medical Services are provided by Haynes Ambulance.

Law enforcement agency is the Autauga County Sheriffs Office.

== Demographics ==
Historical population
Census	Pop.	Note	%±
2010	4,183		—
2020	4,885		16.8%
U.S. Decennial Census; 1850-1870 1870-1880; 1890-1910 1920 1930; 1940 1950 1960; 1970 1980 1990; 2000 2010 2020

Pine level was first listed as a census designated place in the 2010 U.S. census.

Pine Level, Autauga County, Alabama – Racial and ethnic composition Note: the US Census treats Hispanic/Latino as an ethnic category. This table excludes Latinos from the racial categories and assigns them to a separate category. Hispanics/Latinos may be of any race.
Race / Ethnicity (NH = Non-Hispanic)	Pop 2010	Pop 2020	% 2010	% 2020
White alone (NH)	3,813	4,251	91.15%	87.02%
Black or African American alone (NH)	191	321	4.57%	6.57%
Native American or Alaska Native alone (NH)	9	12	0.22%	0.25%
Asian alone (NH)	19	10	0.45%	0.20%
Native Hawaiian or Pacific Islander alone (NH)	4	0	0.10%	0.00%
Other race alone (NH)	5	3	0.12%	0.06%
Mixed race or Multiracial (NH)	70	183	1.67%	3.75%
Hispanic or Latino (any race)	72	105	1.72%	2.15%
Total	4,183	4,885	100.00%	100.00%
