= Shackelford =

Shackelford may refer to

== Places ==
- Shackelford, California, a neighborhood of the city of Modesto
- Shackelford County, Texas, named in honor of Jack Shackelford

== Surname ==
- Brian Shackelford (born 1976), Baseball pitcher
- Douglas A. Shackelford, American academic, dean of the Kenan–Flagler Business School at the University of North Carolina at Chapel Hill
- Edmund Meredith Shackelford (1786–1857), American brigadier general
- Francis Shackelford (c. 1909 – 1973), US General Counsel of the Army and Assistant Secretary of the Army (General Management)
- Jack Shackelford (1790–1857), American doctor and soldier who fought in the Texas Revolution, survivor of the Goliad Massacre
- Jaden Shackelford (born 2001), American basketball player
- James B. Shackelford (1886–1969), American cinematographer
- James M. Shackelford (1827–1907), lawyer, judge and Union Army general during the American Civil War, first federal judge assigned to Indian Territory (now Oklahoma)
- Jane Dabney Shackelford (1895–1979), American educator and writer
- John W. Shackelford (1844–1883), U.S. Congressman from North Carolina
- John Shackelford (baseball), (born 1894), Negro league baseball player
- Kevin Shackelford (born 1989), American baseball player
- Lottie Shackelford, African-American politician, first woman mayor of Little Rock, Arkansas
- Lynn Shackelford (born 1947), American basketball player
- Sonny Shackelford (born 1985), American football player
- Ted Shackelford (born 1946), American actor
- Thomas Shackelford (died 1877), Chief Justice of the Supreme Court of Mississippi
- Todd K. Shackelford (born 1971), American psychologist

== Fictional ==
- Shackelford, character in Clifford's Really Big Movie
- J.D. Shackelford, recurring character in Designing Women
- Ted Shackelford, name of the Man in the Yellow Hat in the 2006 film Curious George

== Given name ==
- Shackelford Miller, Jr. (1892–1965), United States federal judge

== See also ==
- Shackleford (disambiguation)
- Shacklefords (disambiguation)
