= Kingston, Autauga County, Alabama =

Unincorporated community in Alabama, United States

Kingston, Alabama Old Kingston
- Unincorporated community
- Location within Alabama
- Coordinates: 32°34′25″N 86°36′03″W
- Country: United States
- State: Alabama
- County: Autauga
- Elevation: 407 ft (124 m)
- Time zone: UTC-6 (Central (CST))
  - Summer (DST): UTC-5 (CDT)
- ZIP code: 36067
- Area code: 334
- GNIS feature ID: 152781

Kingston, also known as Old Kingston, is an unincorporated community in Autauga County, Alabama. Kingston served as the county seat of Autauga County from 1830 to 1868, when it was moved to Prattville. Kingston became a ghost town, until a new community was formed around the home of Edmund Meredith Shackelford, an officer who served in the War of 1812. A post office was operated in Kingston from 1830 to 1908.

The community was devastated by an intense EF3 tornado on January 12, 2023. Dozens of mobile homes were completely destroyed, seven people were killed, and 16 others were injured. The tornado came just 9 days after another tornado struck the area, although it was a much weaker one that was rated EF0.
