= Eugene Allen Smith =

American geologist

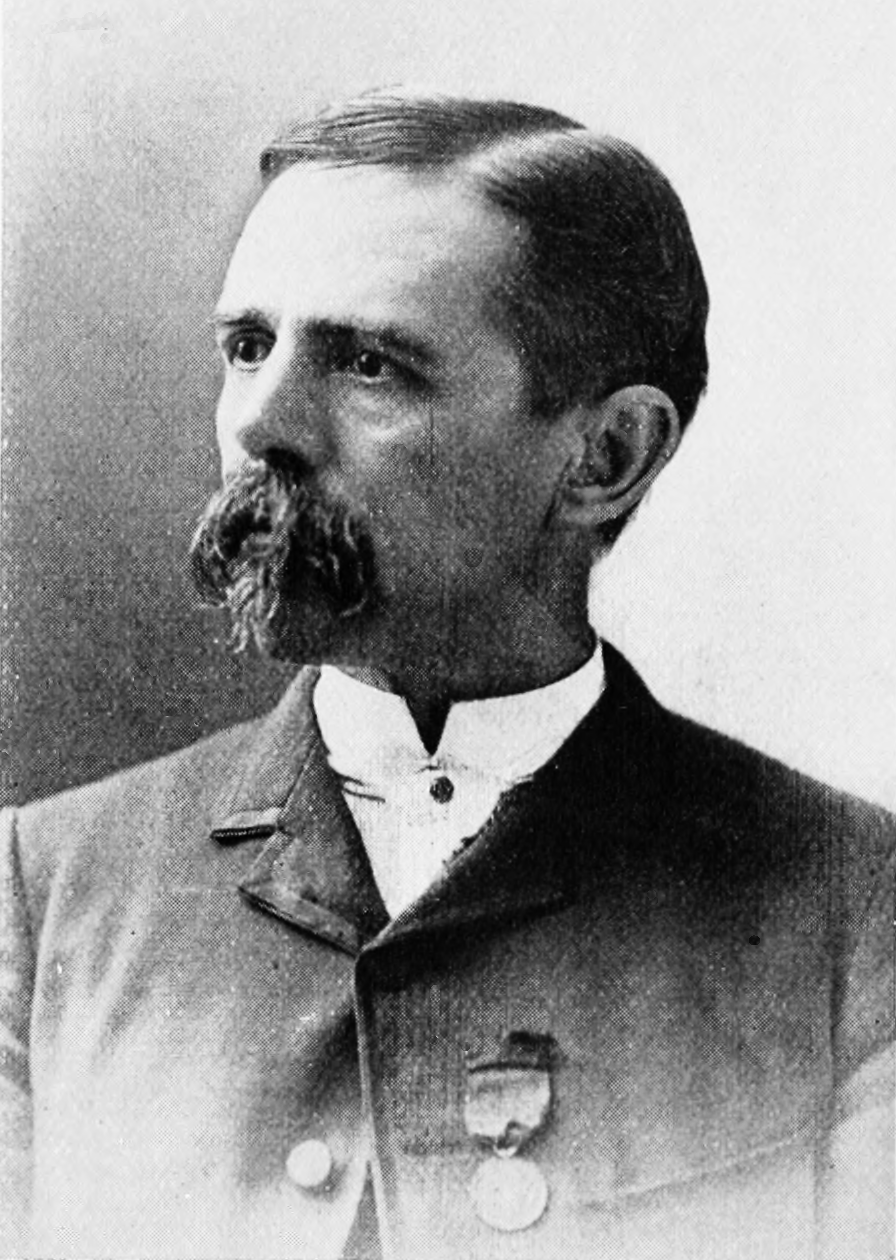
- Born: October 27, 1841; Washington, Alabama
- Died: September 7, 1927 (aged 85); Tuscaloosa, Alabama
- Education: University of Alabama; University of Heidelberg
- Occupation: Geologist
- Spouse: Jane Henry Meredith
- Children: Eugene Smith Jr. Julia Allyn Smith; Landon G. Smith; Truman Aldrich Smith; Merrill Pratt Smith
- Parent(s): Samuel Parrish Smith; Adelaide Julia Allen

Eugene Allen Smith (October 27, 1841 – September 7, 1927) was an American geologist. After serving in the American Civil War, he became the Alabama state geologist in 1873 and president of the Geological Society of America in 1913.

== Biography ==
He was born in the (now former) town of Washington, Alabama, in 1841, the son of Samuel Parrish Smith and his wife Adelaide Julia Allen. After an education in Prattville and a three-year stint at Central High School in Philadelphia, Eugene matriculated to the University of Alabama as a junior in 1860, where he graduated with an A.B. in 1862. With the American Civil War underway, Eugene enlisted as a private with the 33rd Regiment Alabama Infantry of the Confederate States Army, and was elected to the rank of 2nd lieutenant by the men. In December 1862, Eugene was appointed Instructor of Military Tactics at the University of Alabama by Jefferson Davis, president of the Confederate states. He remained in that post for the remainder of the war.

In 1865 he entered graduate school at the University of Berlin, followed by further studies at the University of Göttingen, and finally spent two years at the University of Heidelberg, where he was awarded a Ph.D. in 1868. Returning to the United States, Dr. Smith joined the University of Mississippi faculty as an instructor of chemistry. In addition to his teaching duties, he served as assistant state geologist for Mississippi from 1868–1871. In 1871 he was named professor of geology at the rebuilding University of Alabama. On July 10, 1872 he married Jane Henry Meredith Garland; the couple had a son, Merrill Smith.

Still on the staff of the University of Alabama, in 1873 Dr. Smith became Alabama state Geologist. He resumed a state geological survey that had been discontinued in 1857 with the death of Michael Tuomey, reporting on the mineral resources of Alabama. In 1878 he served as honorary commissioner for the state of Alabama to the Exposition Universelle in Paris, France. From 1884–1889 he served as a member of the American committee for the International Geological Congress. In 1904 he was a sectional vice president for the American Association for the Advancement of Science. He was vice president for the Geological Society of America in 1906 and served as president in 1913.

At the age of 86, he died at his home in Tuscaloosa eight days after surgery for a strangulated hernia. During his career, Dr. Smith had 116 publications in geological and scientific scholarly journals. Smith Hall on the University of Alabama campus is named after him; this building is now the Alabama Museum of Natural History. In 1953, he was made a member of the Alabama Hall of Fame.
