= Marbury High School =

Location
- 2360 Highway 31 North; Deatsville, Alabama 36022; United States; 32°42′01″N 86°28′28″W

Information
- School type: State/Federal, High School (9-15)
- Founded: 1910 (116 years ago)
- School district: Autauga County Schools
- CEEB code: 011710
- Chairperson: Superintendent: Lyman Woodfin
- Principal: Jimmy Lansdell
- Staff: 34.50 (FTE)
- Faculty: 31 full time faculty members.
- Enrollment: 584 (2023-2024)
- Average class size: 72 students
- Student to teacher ratio: 16.93
- Campus size: 709 (9-12)
- Campus type: Outer Suburban
- Colors: White and Royal Blue
- Slogan: Promoting a challenging and caring school community, and encouraging lifelong learning for all students
- Athletics: Jimmy Lansdell
- Athletics conference: (5A)
- Sports: Football, Soccer, Baseball, Basketball, Softball, Volleyball, Track & Field, Cheer, Bowling
- Mascot: Bulldog
- Team name: Marbury Bulldogs, Marbury Dawgs, Marbury Lady Dawgs
- Rival: Holtville High School (Elmore County.)
- Accreditation: SACS
- Yearbook: MARALA
- Graduates (2017): 118
- Performing Arts: Marching Band, Concert Band, Jazz Band, Pep Band, Choir, Theatre
- Website: www.marburyhighschool.com

Marbury High School in Autauga County, Alabama serves grades 9-12 and is part of the Autauga County School System. As of the 2017–2018 school year, the schools student body consisted of 590 high school students.

== Notable alumni ==
- Brandon Dickson, MLB player (St. Louis Cardinals)
- Pierre Warren, NFL player
- Dewayne White, NFL player
