= Billingsley, Alabama =

- Village
- Location of Billingsley in Autauga County, Alabama.
- Coordinates: 32°39′40″N 86°42′31″W
- Country: United States
- State: Alabama
- County: Autauga
- Incorporated: 1901

Government
  - Type: Mayor-council
  - Mayor: David Hanson

Area
  - Total: 1.18 sq mi (3.05 km^{2})
  - Land: 1.17 sq mi (3.04 km^{2})
  - Water: 0 sq mi (0.00 km^{2})
- Elevation: 417 ft (127 m)

Population (2020)
  - Total: 125
  - Density: 106.4/sq mi (41.09/km^{2})
- Time zone: UTC-6 (Central (CST))
  - Summer (DST): UTC-5 (CDT)
- ZIP code: 36006
- Area codes: 205, 659
- FIPS code: 01-06460
- GNIS feature ID: 2405265

Billingsley is a village in Autauga County, Alabama, United States. At the 2020 census, the population was 125. It is part of the Montgomery Metropolitan Statistical Area.

== History ==
Billingsley was initially referred to as Cartersville after the W. W. Carter family (the first settlers in the area) established a grist mill, a lumber company, and a cotton gin in the area. By the time the settlement had grown enough to warrant an official name, however, the Carter family was no longer the largest family, having been surpassed by the Billingsley family. Therefore, the town was named in honor of Clement Billingsley, who had served in the Revolutionary War. Billingsley was one of several war veterans from Virginia who moved west to present-day Autauga County. Upon Billingsley’s death in 1844, his assets, which included land, money, and enslaved African Americans, were divided among his children, thereby increasing the family’s prominence in the county. Billingsley is buried in the Gaines Cemetery in the town.

By the 1880s, Billingsley had a mail stop on a stagecoach route. In 1898, a Montgomery, Alabama branch of the Mobile and Ohio Railroad completed a line through town, bringing with it a construction and population boom. The town expanded enough to support six general stores among other businesses, and the local sawmill tripled its output. The town incorporated in 1901.

== Geography ==
The community is located approximately 37 mi (60 km) northwest of Montgomery, 69 mi (111 km) south of Birmingham, and 69 mi (111 km) southeast of Tuscaloosa via major roads in the area (I-65 and U.S. Route 82).

According to the U.S. Census Bureau, the town has a total area of 1.3 square miles (3.4 km^{2}), of which 0.0012 square miles (0.003 km^{2}), or 0.12%, is water.

=== Climate ===
The climate in this area is characterized by hot, humid summers and generally mild to cool winters. According to the Köppen Climate Classification system, Billingsley has a humid subtropical climate, abbreviated "Cfa" on climate maps.

== Demographics ==
Historical population
Census	Pop.	Note	%±
1910	256		—
1920	214		−16.4%
1930	189		−11.7%
1940	183		−3.2%
1950	158		−13.7%
1960	179		13.3%
1970	110		−38.5%
1980	106		−3.6%
1990	150		41.5%
2000	116		−22.7%
2010	144		24.1%
2020	125		−13.2%
U.S. Decennial Census

As of the census of 2000, there were 116 people, 46 households, and 33 families residing in the town. The population density was 98.6 inhabitants per square mile (38.1/km^{2}). There were 58 housing units at an average density of 49.3 per square mile (19.0/km^{2}). The racial makeup of the town was 90.52% White, 6.03% Black or African American, 1.72% Native American and 1.72% Pacific Islander.

There were 46 households, out of which 21.7% had children under the age of 18 living with them, 54.3% were married couples living together, 15.2% had a female householder with no husband present, and 26.1% were non-families. 19.6% of all households were made up of individuals, and 13.0% had someone living alone who was 65 years of age or older. The average household size was 2.52 and the average family size was 2.94.

In the town, the population was spread out, with 20.7% under the age of 18, 5.2% from 18 to 24, 29.3% from 25 to 44, 20.7% from 45 to 64, and 24.1% who were 65 years of age or older. The median age was 40 years. For every 100 females, there were 73.1 males. For every 100 females age 18 and over, there were 84.0 males.

The median income for a household in the town was $44,688, and the median income for a family was $46,000. Males had a median income of $30,625 versus $15,750 for females. The per capita income for the town was $14,713. There were 10.0% of families and 11.7% of the population living below the poverty line, including 14.8% of under eighteens and 4.8% of those over 64.

== Emergency Services ==
Fire protection is provided by the Billingsley Volunteer Fire Department.

Emergency Medical Services are provided by Haynes Ambulance.

Law enforcement agency is the Autauga County Sheriffs Office.

== Education facilities ==
The Billingsley High School provides the city for education.

== Notable people ==
- Lady Bird Johnson, wife of President Lyndon B. Johnson, lived in Billingsley with relatives as a child for a time after her mother died and spent summers there until she was about 20 years old.
