= Alabama Museum of Natural History =

Museum in Tuscaloosa, Alabama, United States

Coordinates: 33.212°N 87.544°W

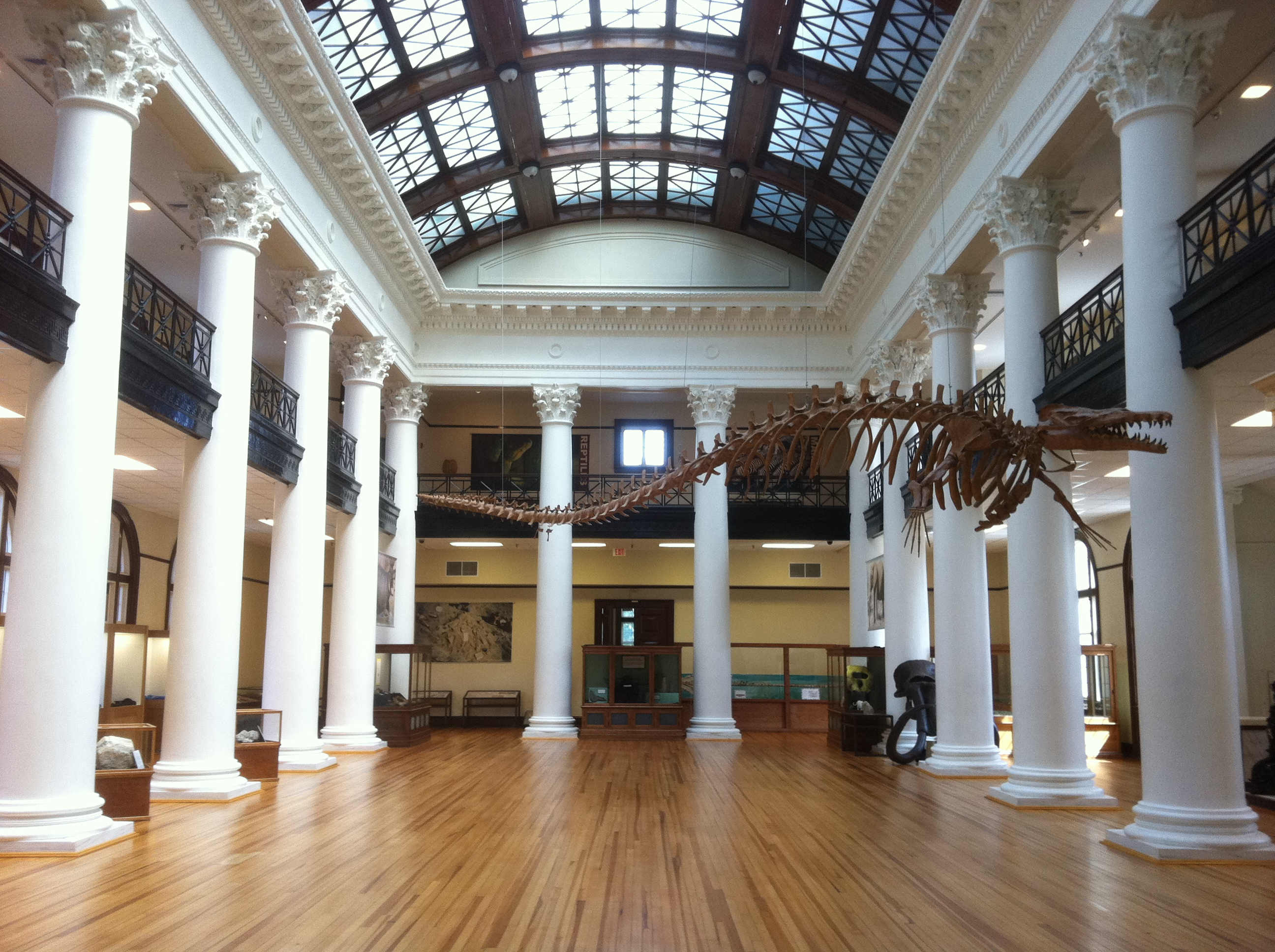
- View of the Grand Gallery of Smith Hall looking North.
- Established: 1831
- Location: Tuscaloosa, Alabama; United States
- Website: http://www.amnh.ua.edu

The Alabama Museum of Natural History is the official natural history museum of the state of Alabama, located in Smith Hall on the campus of the University of Alabama campus in Tuscaloosa. Established in 1831, it is the oldest museum in the state.

The exhibits depict the natural diversity of Alabama from the Age of Dinosaurs, the Coal Age, and the Ice Age. Collections include items relating to geology, zoology, mineralogy, paleontology, ethnology, history, and photography. The Grand Gallery Exhibition Hall houses a replica of a Basilosaurus cetoides, an Eocene whale that has been designated as the State Fossil.

Exhibits include the skull of an American mastodon dredged from the Tombigbee River near Demopolis and the Hodges meteorite. The latter hit a woman as it fell to earth near Sylacauga on November 30, 1954. The museum sponsors expeditions throughout the year, as it has since 1979.

== History ==
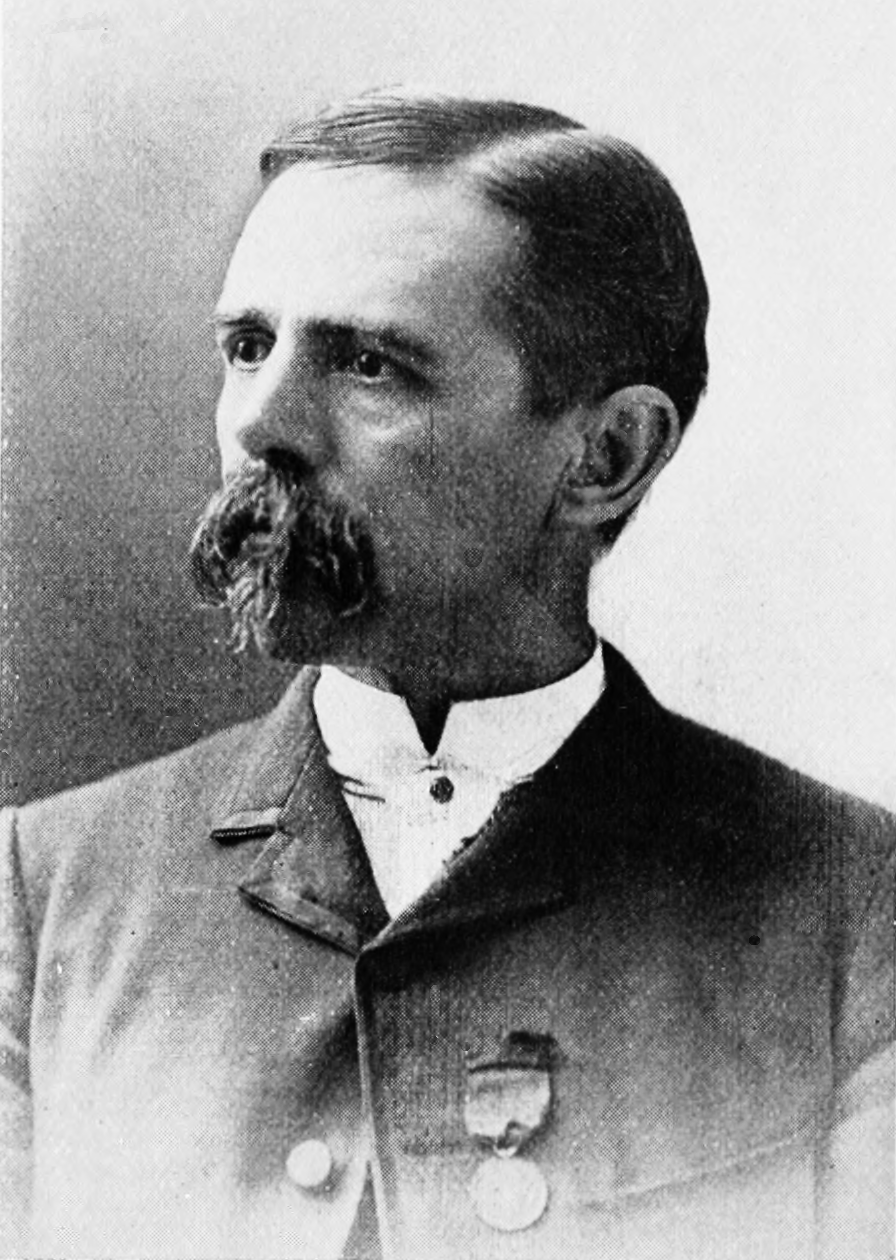
Eugene Allen Smith for whom Smith Hall is named

The Alabama Museum of Natural History was established in 1831, when the University of Alabama began assembling natural history specimens for research and teaching. The site of the Alabama Museum of Natural History, Smith Hall, is named for Eugene Allen Smith, who was appointed state geologist in 1873 and spent nearly forty years surveying, mapping and collecting scientific specimens throughout the state. The cornerstone for Smith Hall was laid on May 28, 1907. Construction was completed in the autumn of 1909 and it was formally dedicated on May 5, 1910.

Smith recruited collector Herbert Huntington Smith (no relation) as the museum's curator. Herbert H. Smith directed the Museum under Eugene Smith from 1910 till his death in 1919.

Herbert Smith's wife, Amelia Woolworth Smith was also a collector and worked for the museum, and replaced her husband as acting curator after he died.

== Architecture ==
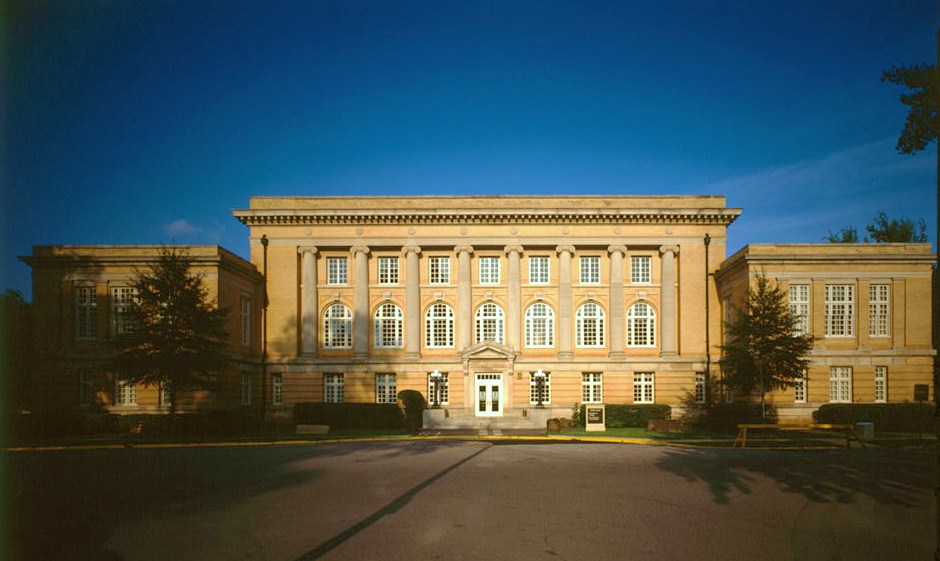
Smith Hall in 1993

Smith Hall consists of a three-story central block, built to house the Alabama Museum of Natural History, and adjoining two-story north and south wings. The north wing originally housed the Department of Biology with the south wing housing the Department of Geology. The Department of Geology currently occupies both wings. The architecture of Smith Hall mirrors on a smaller scale the design and layout of several large natural history museums that were also built during the early years of the 20th century in Chicago, New York City, and Washington, D.C.

The building is designed in a Classical Revival style known as Beaux-Arts. The exterior features an engaged colonnade of eight Ionic columns raised above a podium-like ground floor. The main entrance is at ground level through a pedimented stone doorway. Immediately inside the entrance is a center hall dominated by a sweeping staircase made of Alabama marble and supported by Alabama-manufactured iron. The staircase leads to the Grand Gallery Exhibition Hall on the second floor. The Grand Gallery is ringed by a colonnade of monumental Corinthian columns supporting an entablature and cornice. A barrel vaulted ceiling above the cornice contains skylights that provide the space with natural light.

== See also ==
- List of museums in Alabama
