= Autauga County, Alabama =

County in Alabama, United States

- County
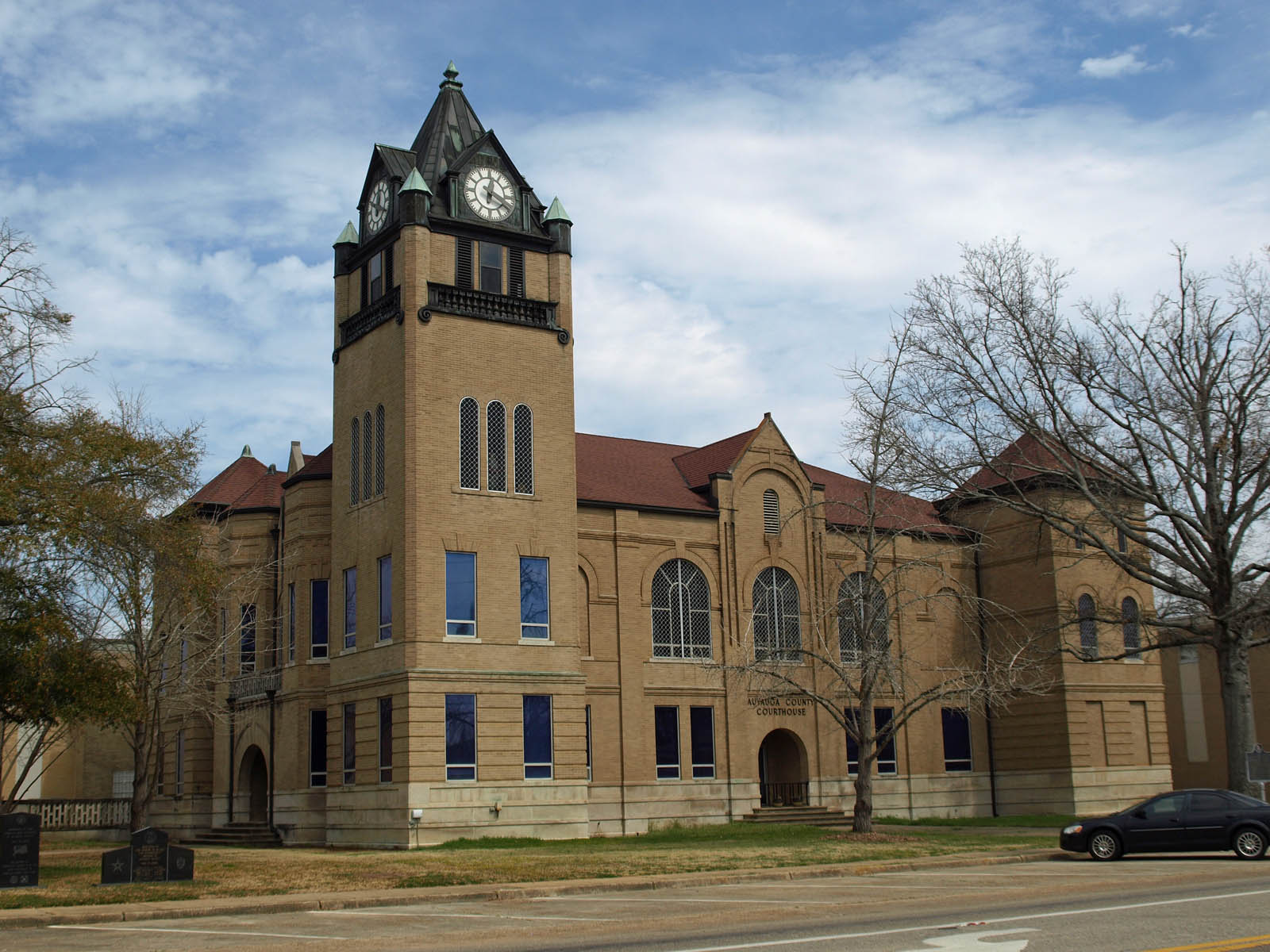
- Autauga County Courthouse in Prattville

- Seal Logo

- Location within the U.S. state of Alabama
- Coordinates: 32°32′12″N 86°38′54″W
- Country: United States
- State: Alabama
- Founded: November 21, 1818
- Seat: Prattville
- Largest city: Prattville

Area
  - Total: 604 sq mi (1,560 km^{2})
  - Land: 594 sq mi (1,540 km^{2})
  - Water: 10 sq mi (26 km^{2}) 1.6%

Population (2020)
  - Total: 58,805
  - Estimate (2025): 61,920 ▲
  - Density: 99.0/sq mi (38.2/km^{2})
- Time zone: UTC−6 (Central)
  - Summer (DST): UTC−5 (CDT)
- Congressional district: 6th
- Website: www.autaugaco.org
- County Number 04 on Alabama Licence Plates

Autauga County is a county located in the central portion of the U.S. state of Alabama. As of the 2020 census the population was 58,805. Its county seat is Prattville.

Autauga County is part of the Montgomery metropolitan area.

== History ==
Autauga County was established on November 21, 1818, by an act of the Alabama Territorial Legislature (one year before Alabama was admitted as a State). As established, the county included present-day Autauga County, as well as Elmore County and Chilton County. At the time, Autauga (aka, Tawasa) Indians lived here. They were concentrated at Atagi (meaning "pure water") village situated on the banks of a creek by the same name (called "Pearl Water Creek" by settlers); it is a tributary of the Alabama River. Other scholars suggest the Creek word atigi, meaning "border," as the source of the name Autauga.

The Autauga were a band of the Alibamu tribe, and named after their geographic location. The Alibamu eventually were absorbed into the Creek Confederacy. During Andrew Jackson's invasion of the area during the Creek War, as part of the War of 1812, the Autaga sent many warriors to resist. The county was part of the territory ceded in 1814 by the Creek Confederacy in the Treaty of Fort Jackson.

The territorial legislature designated the first county seat as Jackson's Mill, but the court met there only briefly, choosing to select a permanent seat at Washington. The new county seat was built on the former site of Atagi village in the southeast corner of the county. With population growth more in the west of the county, the county seat was moved to a more central location at Kingston in 1830. Losing business and residents to the new county seat, the town of Washington dwindled until it was completely deserted by the late 1830s.

Daniel Pratt arrived in Autauga County in 1833 and founded the new town of Prattville, north of Atagi on the fall line of Autauga Creek. His cotton gin factory quickly became the largest manufacturer of gins in the world; it was the first major industry in Alabama.

Pratt financially backed the recruitment at his factory of men for the Prattville Dragoons, a fighting unit for the Confederacy. It was organized in anticipation of the Civil War. Other units formed in Autauga County included the Autauga Rifles (Autaugaville), The John Steele Guards (western Autauga Co.) and the Varina Rifles (northern Autauga Co.). None of the fighting of the Civil War reached Autauga County. Pratt was able to secure payment of debts from Northern accounts soon after the war, lessening the disabling effects of the Reconstruction period in the county.

Immediately after emancipation in early 1863, Charles Atwood, a freedman who had formerly been enslaved by Daniel Pratt, bought a house in the center of Prattville. He became one of the founding investors in Pratt's South and North Railroad. It was exceptional for an African American to become so economically successful and prominent, and to own land in an Alabama city in this period.

In 1866 and 1868, the legislature established Elmore and Chilton counties from Autauga County. The county seat was newly designated as Prattville, which was the population center of the redefined jurisdiction. A new courthouse was completed there in 1870 by local builder George L. Smith. In 1906, a new and larger courthouse was erected a block north; it was designed in a modified Richardsonian Romanesque style. The building was designed by Bruce Architectural Co. of Birmingham and built by Dobson & Bynum of Montgomery.

== Geography ==
According to the United States Census Bureau, the county has a total area of 604 square miles (1,560 km^{2}), of which 594 square miles (1,540 km^{2}) is land and 10 square miles (26 km^{2}) (1.6%) is water. The county is mostly located in the Gulf Coastal Plain region, with a few rolling hills and forests due to its close proximity to the fall line of the eastern United States.

=== Climate ===
The county has a prevailing humid subtropical climate dominated by its location in the Southern Plains ecological sub-region of the United States.

=== Major highways ===
- Interstate 65
- U.S. Highway 31 / State Route 3 (unsigned)
- U.S. Highway 82 / State Route 6 (unsigned)
- State Route 14
- State Route 111
- State Route 143

=== Adjacent counties ===
- Chilton County - north
- Elmore County - east
- Montgomery County - southeast
- Lowndes County - south
- Dallas County - west

== Demographics ==
Historical population
Census	Pop.	Note	%±
1820	3,853		—
1830	11,874		208.2%
1840	14,342		20.8%
1850	15,023		4.7%
1860	16,739		11.4%
1870	11,623		−30.6%
1880	13,108		12.8%
1890	13,330		1.7%
1900	17,915		34.4%
1910	20,038		11.9%
1920	18,908		−5.6%
1930	19,694		4.2%
1940	20,977		6.5%
1950	18,186		−13.3%
1960	18,739		3.0%
1970	24,460		30.5%
1980	32,259		31.9%
1990	34,222		6.1%
2000	43,671		27.6%
2010	54,571		25.0%
2020	58,805		7.8%
2025 (est.)	61,920	▲	5.3%
U.S. Decennial Census; 1790–1960 1900–1990; 1990–2000 2010–2020

=== 2020 census ===
Autauga County, Alabama – Racial and ethnic composition Note: the US Census treats Hispanic/Latino as an ethnic category. This table excludes Latinos from the racial categories and assigns them to a separate category. Hispanics/Latinos may be of any race.
Race / Ethnicity (NH = Non-Hispanic)	Pop 1980	Pop 1990	Pop 2000	Pop 2010	Pop 2020	% 1980	% 1990	% 2000	% 2010	% 2020
White alone (NH)	24,603	26,997	34,823	42,154	41,582	76.27%	78.89%	79.74%	77.25%	70.71%
Black or African American alone (NH)	7,118	6,806	7,428	9,595	11,352	22.07%	19.89%	17.01%	17.58%	19.30%
Native American or Alaska Native alone (NH)	58	71	186	217	184	0.18%	0.21%	0.43%	0.40%	0.31%
Asian alone (NH)	82	118	194	467	873	0.25%	0.34%	0.44%	0.86%	1.48%
Native Hawaiian or Pacific Islander alone (NH)	x	x	12	22	22	x	x	0.03%	0.04%	0.04%
Other race alone (NH)	35	0	44	45	185	0.11%	0.00%	0.10%	0.08%	0.31%
Mixed race or Multiracial (NH)	x	x	374	761	2,490	x	x	0.86%	1.39%	4.23%
Hispanic or Latino (any race)	363	230	610	1,310	2,117	1.13%	0.67%	1.40%	2.40%	3.60%
Total	32,259	34,222	43,671	54,571	58,805	100.00%	100.00%	100.00%	100.00%	100.00%

As of the 2020 census, the county had a population of 58,805. The median age was 38.9 years. 24.3% of residents were under the age of 18 and 15.7% of residents were 65 years of age or older. For every 100 females there were 93.3 males, and for every 100 females age 18 and over there were 90.3 males age 18 and over.

The racial makeup of the county was 71.7% White, 19.5% Black or African American, 0.4% American Indian and Alaska Native, 1.5% Asian, 0.1% Native Hawaiian and Pacific Islander, 1.5% from some other race, and 5.4% from two or more races. Hispanic or Latino residents of any race comprised 3.6% of the population.

59.3% of residents lived in urban areas, while 40.7% lived in rural areas.

There were 22,412 households in the county, of which 34.9% had children under the age of 18 living with them and 27.3% had a female householder with no spouse or partner present. About 24.4% of all households were made up of individuals and 10.0% had someone living alone who was 65 years of age or older.

There were 24,350 housing units, of which 8.0% were vacant. Among occupied housing units, 73.8% were owner-occupied and 26.2% were renter-occupied. The homeowner vacancy rate was 1.1% and the rental vacancy rate was 6.9%.

=== 2010 census ===
As of the census of 2010, there were 54,571 people, 20,221 households, and 15,064 families residing in the county. The population density was 91 people per square mile (35 people/km^{2}). There were 22,135 housing units at an average density of 36 units per square mile (14 units/km^{2}). The racial makeup of the county was 78.5% White, 17.7% Black or African American, 0.4% Native American, 0.9% Asian, 0.1% Pacific Islander, and 1.6% from two or more races. 2.4% of the population were Hispanic or Latino of any race.

There were 20,221 households, out of which 34.9% had children under the age of 18 living with them, 56.2% were married couples living together, 13.7% had a female householder with no husband present, and 25.5% were non-families. 22.0% of all households were made up of individuals, and 8.0% had someone living alone who was 65 years of age or older. The average household size was 2.68, and the average family size was 3.13.

In the county, the population was spread out, with 26.8% under the age of 18, 8.5% from 18 to 24, 27% from 25 to 44, 25.7% from 45 to 64, and 12.0% who were 65 years of age or older. The median age was 37 years. For every 100 females, there were 94.9 males.

The median income for a household in the county was $53,682, and the median income for a family was $66,349. Males had a median income of $49,743 versus $32,592 for females. The per capita income for the county was $24,571. About 8.3% of families and 12.1% of the population were below the poverty line, including 17.5% of those under age 18 and 7.0% of those age 65 or over.

In 2000, the largest denominational groups were Evangelical Protestants (with 18,893 adherents) and Mainline Protestants (with 3,657 adherents). The largest religious bodies were The Southern Baptist Convention (with 14,727 members) and The United Methodist Church (with 3,305 members).

== Education ==
Autauga County contains one public school district. There are approximately 9,000 students in public K-12 schools in Autauga County.

=== Districts ===
School districts include:

- Autauga County School District

== Government ==
United States presidential election results for Autauga County, Alabama
Year	Republican		Democratic		Third party(ies)	
Year	No.	%	No.	%	No.	%
1824	68	12.71%	274	51.21%	193	36.07%
1828	43	6.74%	595	93.26%	0	0.00%
1836	609	51.87%	565	48.13%	0	0.00%
1840	591	50.73%	574	49.27%	0	0.00%
1844	475	42.87%	633	57.13%	0	0.00%
1848	553	54.00%	471	46.00%	0	0.00%
1852	196	27.11%	322	44.54%	205	28.35%
1856	0	0.00%	621	56.66%	475	43.34%
1860	0	0.00%	392	31.16%	866	68.84%
1868	1,505	63.88%	851	36.12%	0	0.00%
1872	1,593	70.42%	669	29.58%	0	0.00%
1876	1,576	66.22%	804	33.78%	0	0.00%
1880	974	49.52%	978	49.72%	15	0.76%
1884	877	49.02%	911	50.92%	1	0.06%
1888	519	36.76%	893	63.24%	0	0.00%
1892	81	4.13%	926	47.24%	953	48.62%
1896	289	17.20%	1,281	76.25%	110	6.55%
1900	537	34.36%	980	62.70%	46	2.94%
1904	73	8.95%	733	89.83%	10	1.23%
1908	97	12.90%	655	87.10%	0	0.00%
1912	43	5.07%	622	73.35%	183	21.58%
1916	99	11.15%	773	87.05%	16	1.80%
1920	210	18.44%	918	80.60%	11	0.97%
1924	146	15.30%	781	81.87%	27	2.83%
1928	683	43.61%	883	56.39%	0	0.00%
1932	138	9.37%	1,322	89.75%	13	0.88%
1936	84	5.19%	1,525	94.31%	8	0.49%
1940	99	5.69%	1,630	93.62%	12	0.69%
1944	117	8.58%	1,242	91.06%	5	0.37%
1948	110	8.55%	0	0.00%	1,176	91.45%
1952	787	34.10%	1,505	65.21%	16	0.69%
1956	857	37.47%	1,161	50.77%	269	11.76%
1960	1,149	45.27%	1,324	52.17%	65	2.56%
1964	2,969	85.83%	0	0.00%	490	14.17%
1968	606	7.79%	1,553	19.97%	5,617	72.24%
1972	5,367	75.17%	1,593	22.31%	180	2.52%
1976	4,512	48.32%	4,640	49.69%	186	1.99%
1980	6,292	56.87%	4,295	38.82%	476	4.30%
1984	8,350	70.07%	3,366	28.25%	201	1.69%
1988	7,828	67.17%	3,667	31.47%	159	1.36%
1992	8,715	55.92%	4,819	30.92%	2,051	13.16%
1996	9,509	61.66%	5,015	32.52%	898	5.82%
2000	11,993	69.69%	4,942	28.72%	273	1.59%
2004	15,196	75.67%	4,758	23.69%	127	0.63%
2008	17,403	73.61%	6,093	25.77%	145	0.61%
2012	17,379	72.49%	6,363	26.54%	231	0.96%
2016	18,172	72.77%	5,936	23.77%	865	3.46%
2020	19,838	71.44%	7,503	27.02%	429	1.54%
2024	20,484	72.43%	7,439	26.30%	358	1.27%

United States Senate election results for Autauga County, Alabama2
Year	Republican		Democratic		Third party(ies)	
Year	No.	%	No.	%	No.	%
2020	19,387	69.97%	8,277	29.87%	43	0.16%

United States Senate election results for Autauga County, Alabama3
Year	Republican		Democratic		Third party(ies)	
Year	No.	%	No.	%	No.	%
2022	13,359	75.30%	3,814	21.50%	567	3.20%

Alabama Gubernatorial election results for Autauga County
Year	Republican		Democratic		Third party(ies)	
Year	No.	%	No.	%	No.	%
2022	13,387	75.45%	3,515	19.81%	842	4.75%

The sheriff of Autauga County is Mark Harrell (R). The Revenue Commissioner for the county is Kathy Evans (R), the Probate Judge is Kim Kervin (R), the Circuit Clerk is Deb Hill (R), the Circuit Judge is Ben Fuller (R), the District Attorney is Randall Houston (R) and the District Judge is Joy Booth (R).

The legislature is the county commission which consists of five members all of whom are elected from single member districts. The current Commissioners are:

- District 1: Rusty Jacksland, Republican
- District 2: John L. Thrailkill, Republican
- District 3: Bill Tatum, Republican
- District 4: Jay Thompson, Republican - Chairman
- District 5: Larry Stoudemire, Democratic

Like much of the Southern U.S., Autauga County was historically a Democratic stronghold, voting for the party's presidential nominee in every election between 1880 and 1960. However, the county has switched in affiliation to the Republican Party over the past 50 years. The last Democrat to win the county in a presidential election is Jimmy Carter, who won it by a plurality in 1976.

=== Emergency Services ===
Fire protection in Autauga County is provided by several local fire departments.

Emergency Medical Services are provided by Haynes Ambulance, with the exception of the city of Prattville, where the Prattville Fire Department staffs Ambulances.

Law enforcement agencies are the Autauga County Sheriffs Office and the Prattville Police Department.

== Education ==
The Autauga County School System is the county's sole public school system.

East Memorial Christian Academy was located in an unincorporated area of the county, near Prattville. It closed June 30, 2020, after 16 years in operation.

== Places of interest ==
Autauga County is home to several parks, such as Wilderness Park, Cooters Pond Park, Pratt Park, Swift Creek Park, Newton Park, Spinners Park, Heritage Park, and Overlook Memorial Park.

== Communities ==
=== Cities ===
- Millbrook (mostly in Elmore County)
- Prattville

=== Towns ===
- Autaugaville
- Billingsley
- Pine Level

=== Census-designated place ===
- Marbury

=== Unincorporated communities ===
- Booth
- Evergreen
- Jones
- Kingston
- Mulberry

=== Ghost town ===
- Washington

=== County subdivisions ===
Historical census county divisions of Autauga County

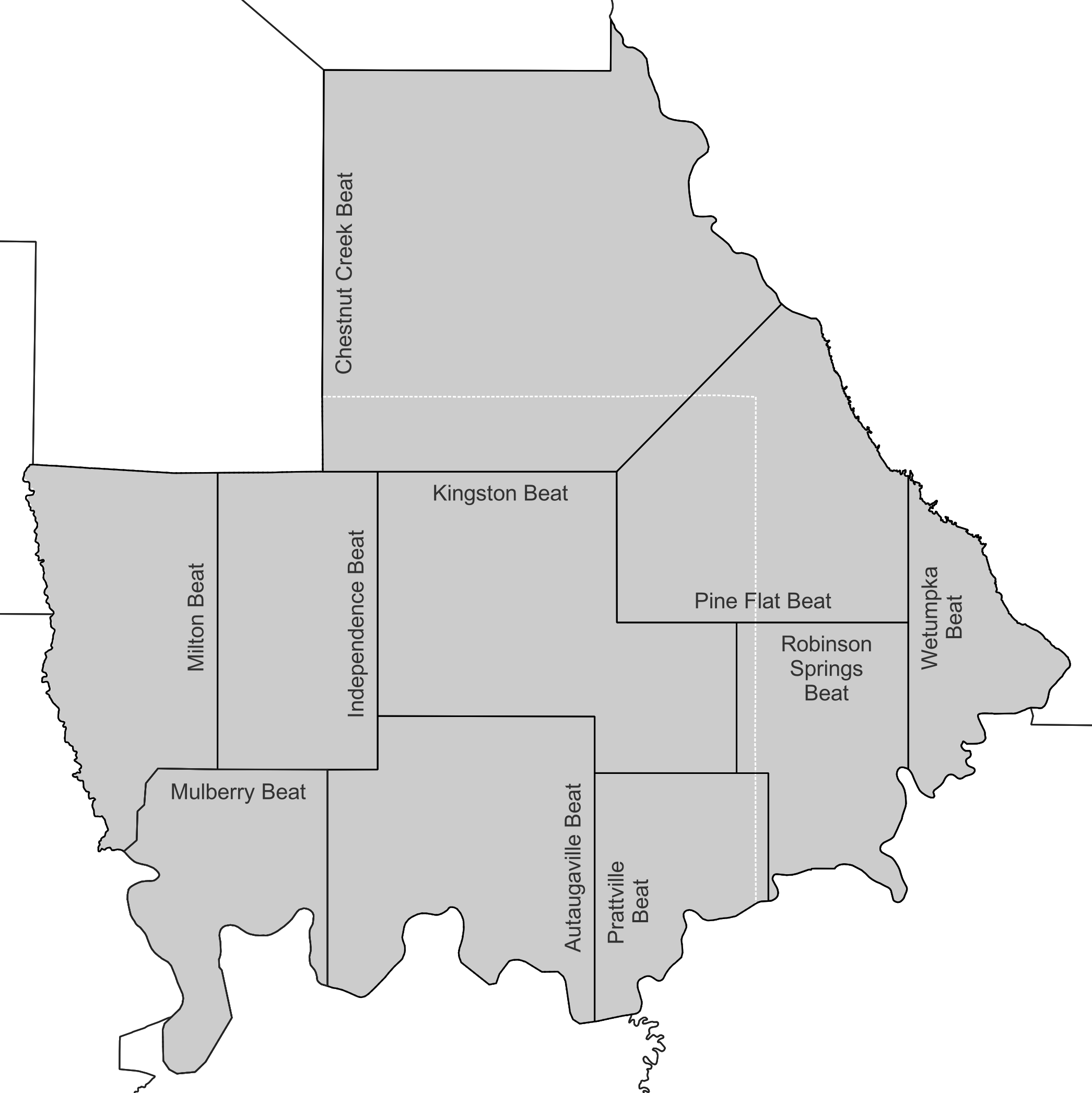
Approximate divisions used in the 1850 and 1860 censuses. The white dotted line represents the current county boundary.

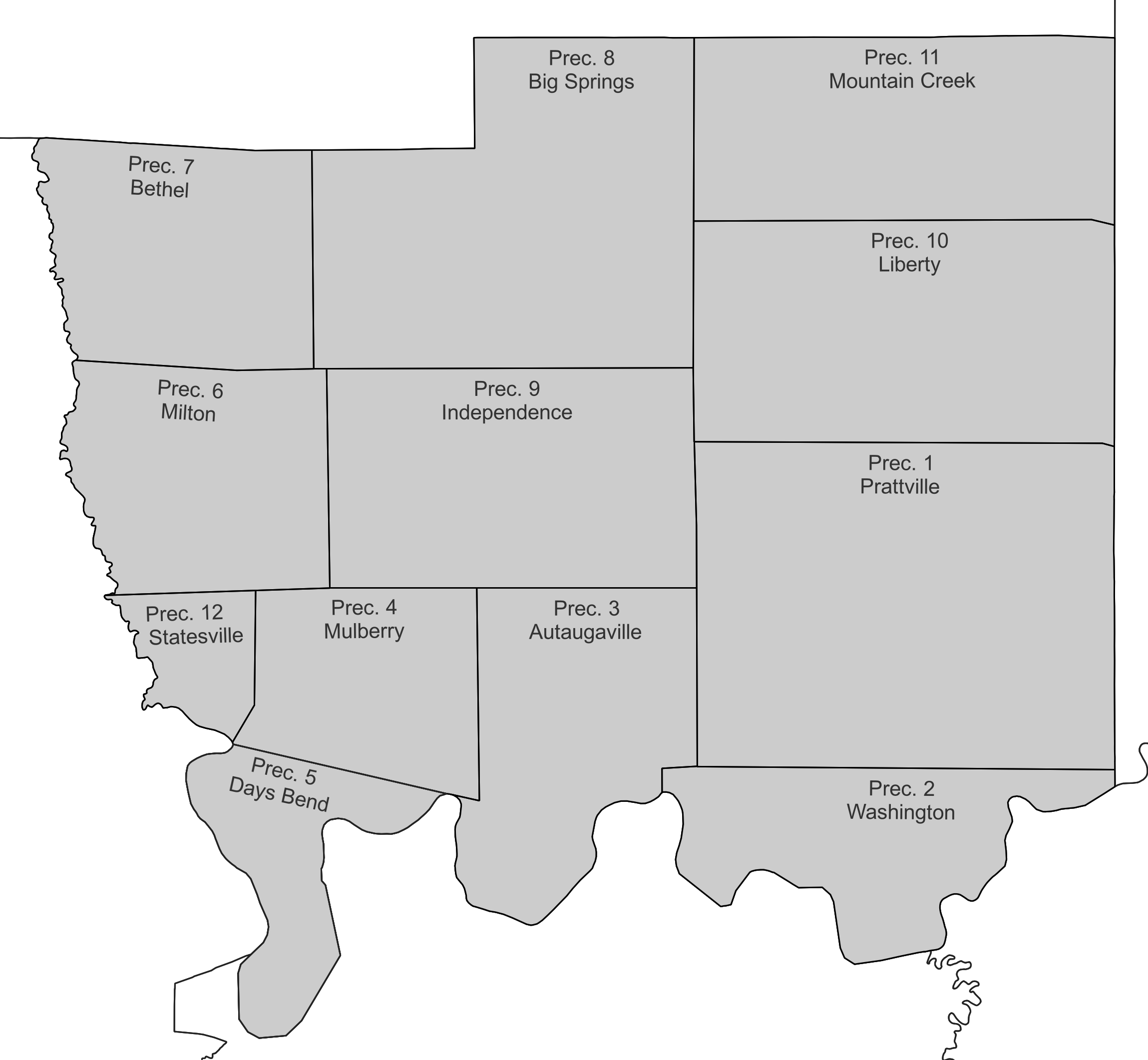
Approximate divisions used in the 1930 census. Similar to those used from 1900 to 1940.

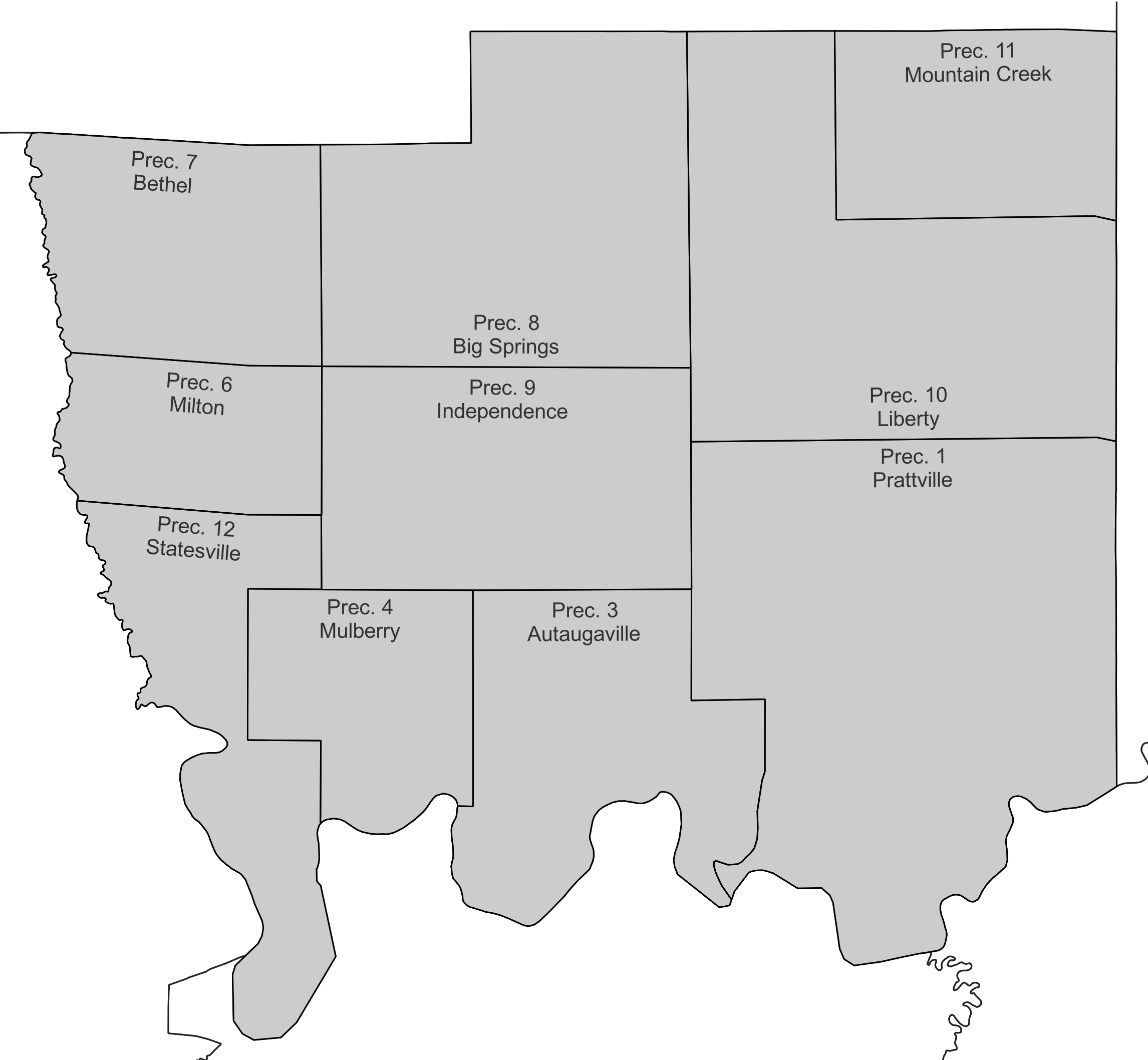
Approximate divisions used in the 1950 census.

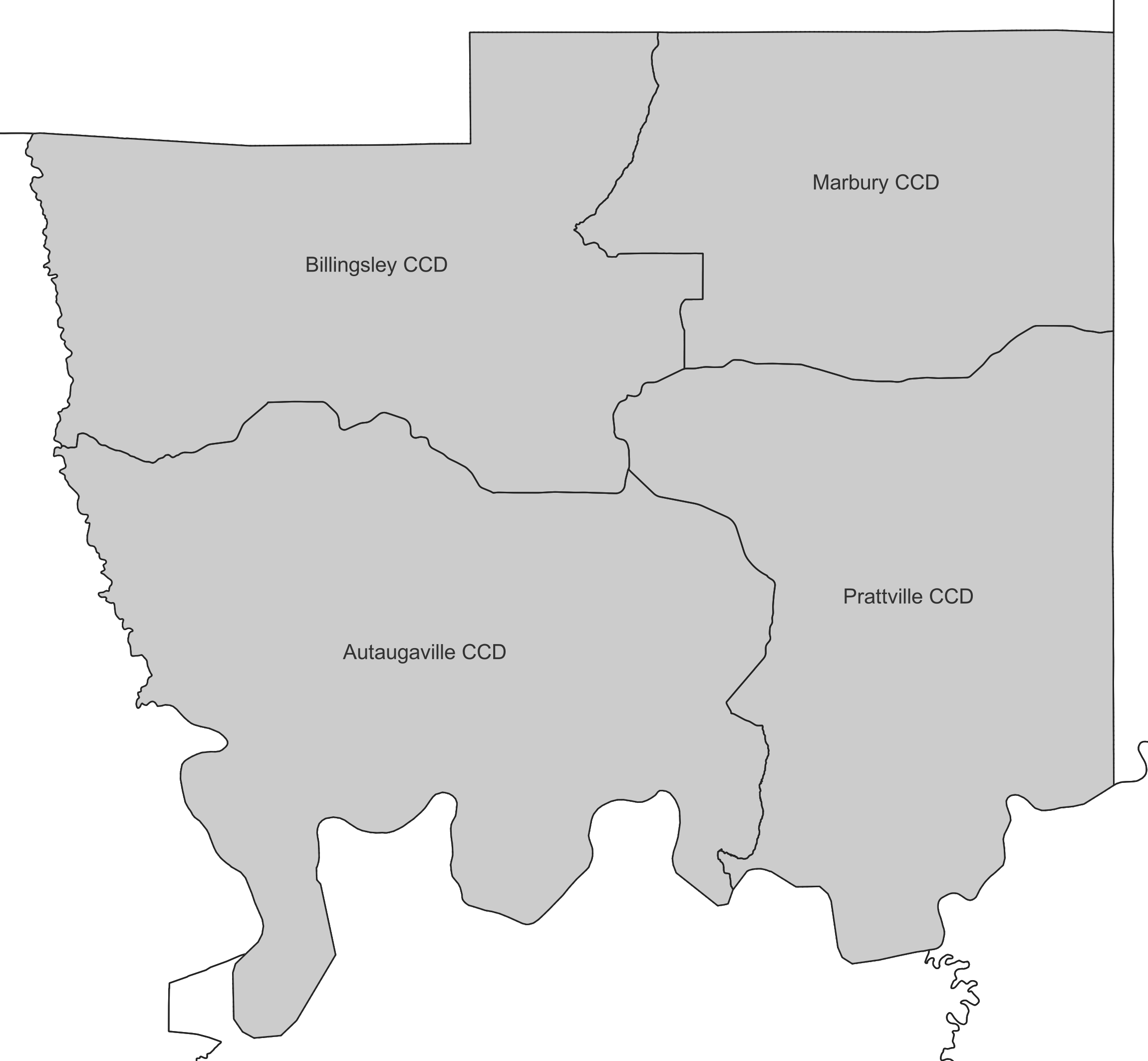
Current divisions as of the 2020 census, in use since at least 1990.

The United States Census Bureau divides counties into county subdivisions. In Autauga County, these are currently in to form of census county divisions. The county's historical subdivisions and their populations in the decennial censuses are as follows:

==== 1850–1880 ====
Subdivision	1850	1860	1870	1880
Beat 1, Prattville	672	3,260	3,675	4,236 (Note: In 1871, Beats 1 and 5 added parts of Beat 6, which was renamed.)
Beat 2, Autaugaville	82	2,119	2,387	2,385
Beat 3, Mulberry	1,366	1,598	1,551	1,764
Beat 4, Milton	1,393	1,125	1,595	2,030
Beat 5, Independence	1,270	800	1,137	1,102
Beat 6, Kingston (1850–1870); Beat 6, Pine Flat (1880)	351	1,960	1,278	1,591
Undefined	9,889 (Note: Includes population from areas lost to Elmore County in 1866 and Baker (Chilton) County in 1868–1869.)	5,887	—	—
County total	15,023	16,739	11,623	13,108

==== 1890–1950 ====
Subdivision	1890	1900	1910	1920	1930	1940	1950
Precinct 1, Prattville	3,143	4,679	5,745	5,102	5,838	7,272	8,550 (Note: Precinct 2 was annexed to Precinct 1 prior to the 1940 census, but were returned separately until the 1950 census.)
Precinct 2, Washington	1,037	1,611	1,552	1,457	1,284	860	—
Precinct 3, Autaugaville	2,025	2,273	2,257	2,411	2,405	1,904	1,641
Precinct 4, Mulberry	1,318	1,211	1,193	1,080	1,260	1,182	652
Precinct 5, Days Bend	448	499	391	343	308	480	— (Note: Precinct 5 was annexed to Precinct 12 prior to the 1940 census, but were returned separately until the 1950 census.)
Precinct 6, Milton	1,231	972 (Note: Precinct 12 was split from Precinct 6 prior to the 1900 census.)	781	704	695	835	401
Precinct 7, Bethel	639	1,061	1,247	1,141	991	946	808
Precinct 8, Big Springs (including Billingsley)	360	841	1,452	1,258	1,421	1,737	1,253
Precinct 9, Independence	892	1,228	1,154	1,265	1,023	1,592	1,125
Precinct 10, Liberty	1,235	1,804	2,095	1,964	2,628	1,927	1,993
Precinct 11, Mountain Creek	1,002	961	1,340	1,290	1,340	1,978	1,101
Precinct 12, Statesville	—	775	831	893	501	264	662
County total	13,330	17,915	20,038	18,908	19,694	20,977	18,186

==== 1960–present ====
Subdivision	1960	1970	1980	1990	2000	2010	2020
Autaugaville CCD	3,354	2,876	3,163	2,983	2,982	3,320	3,185
Billingsley CCD	2,131	1,952	2,172	2,282	2,677	2,894	2,645
Marbury CCD	2,476	2,198	2,835	3,590	4,629	5,675	6,359
Prattville CCD	10,778	17,434	24,089	25,367	33,383	42,682	46,616
County total	18,739	24,460	32,259	34,222	43,671	54,571	58,805

== Notable people ==
- Samuel Smith Harris (1841–1888), born in Autauga County, Presbyterian clergyman, founder and editor of Living Word magazine, and bishop of the Diocese of Michigan.
- William Henry Lanier (1855–1929), born in Autauga County, was a prominent educator who served as president of Alcorn A. and M. from 1899 to 1905. He also served as superintendent of Yazoo City and Jackson, Mississippi black schools.
- Wilson Pickett (1941–2006), born in Prattville, Alabama, American recording artist best known for singing In the Midnight Hour and Mustang Sally.

== In popular culture ==
- Autauga County is the main setting of Rita Williams-Garcia's novel Gone Crazy in Alabama.

== See also ==
- National Register of Historic Places listings in Autauga County, Alabama
- Properties on the Alabama Register of Landmarks and Heritage in Autauga County, Alabama
- List of counties in Alabama
