= Herbert Huntingdon Smith =

American entomologist (1851–1919)

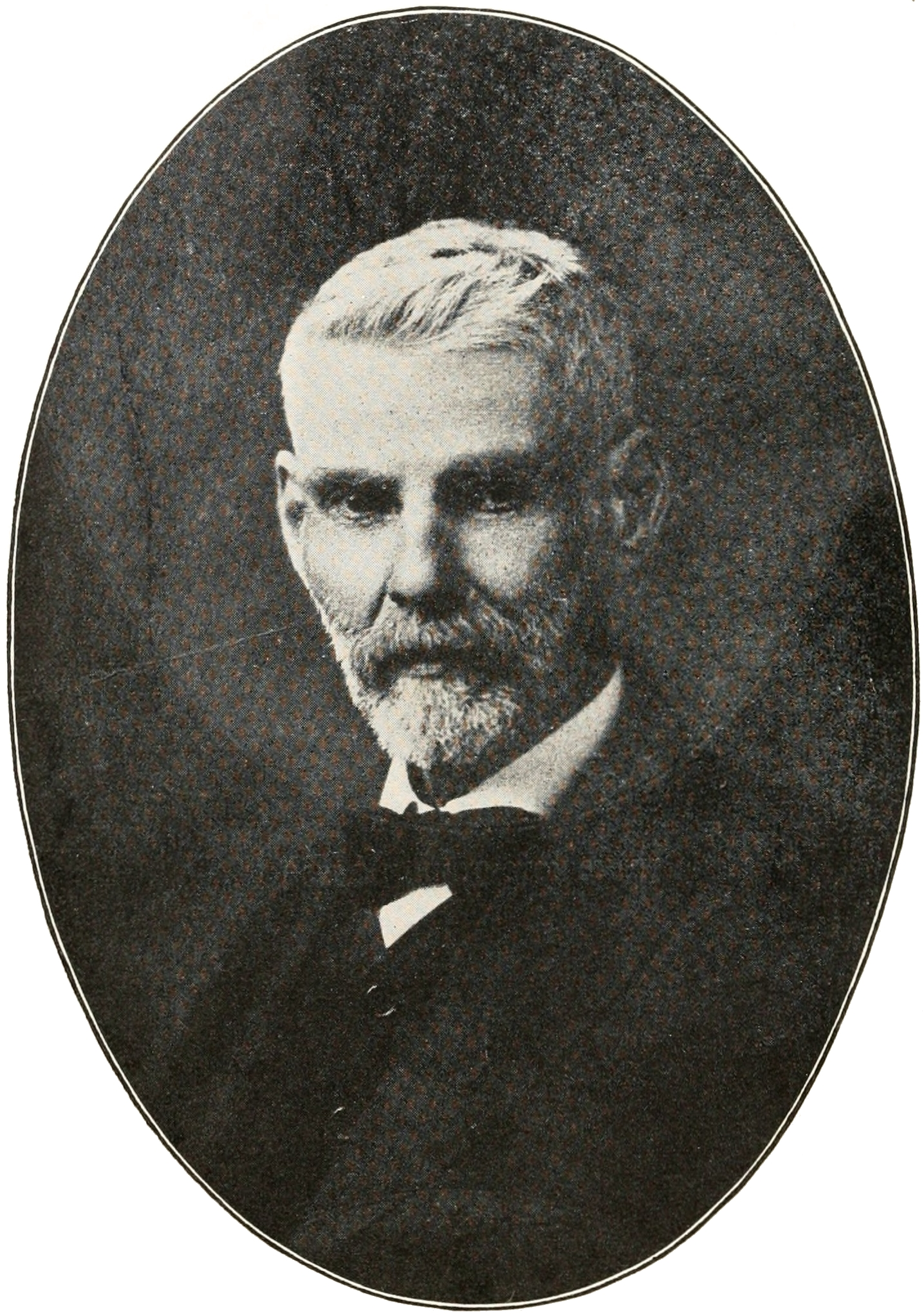
Herbert Huntington Smith

Herbert Huntingdon Smith or Herbert Huntington Smith (January 21, 1851 in Manlius, New York – March 22, 1919 in Tuscaloosa, Alabama) was an American naturalist and amateur conchologist who worked on the flora and fauna of Brazil. He wrote Brazil, the Amazons and the coast (C. Scribner's Sons, 1879) and Do Rio de Janeiro á Cuyabá: Notas de um naturalista (1922).

He first went to Brazil in 1870 on the J. P. Morgan expedition led by Charles Frederick Hartt. He returned to stay in Santarém from 1874 to 1876, and then spent a year exploring the Amazon and Tapajós Rivers.

Back in the United States, he began working for Scribner's Magazine, writing on Brazil and frequently returning, once with the artist James Wells Champney. In 1880, he married Amelia "Daisy" Woolworth, also a naturalist. They lived in Brazil until 1886, travelling widely and visiting Paraguay but spending most time at Chapada dos Guimarães, where intensive collecting (especially of insects) resulted in the discovery of many new species. After a few months in Rio de Janeiro, they returned to the United States.

The insect collections were purchased by William Jacob Holland and Frederick DuCane Godman. In 1889, Smith collected in Mexico for Godman, the results appearing in Biologia Centrali-Americana, with one route taking him from Mexico City down through Moreleos and Guerrero states to Acapulco on the Pacific, and another trip for the region of Southern Veracruz and Tabasco on the Atlantic. He was then commissioned by the Royal Society to collect in the West Indies (Saint Vincent and the Grenadines, Trinidad and the Windward Islands, 1889–1895). He then became Curator at the Carnegie Museum.

From 1898 to 1902, he collected in Colombia for the American Museum of Natural History, where two of his letters are kept, resuming curatorship of the Carnegie Museum on his return.

The couple then moved to Alabama, where they gathered freshwater and land mollusks to supply a "Shell Syndicate" consisting mainly of private collectors. Herbert Smith's abilities were eventually recognized by Eugene Allen Smith, the State Geologist of Alabama, and he was hired on as Curator of the Alabama Museum of Natural History in 1910.

The very many new species collected by Herbert Huntingdon and Amelia "Daisy" W. Smith were described by Frederick DuCane Godman and Herbert Druce (Lepidoptera); Samuel Wendell Williston (Diptera); William Harris Ashmead and Ezra Townsend Cresson (Hymenoptera); George Charles Champion (Coleoptera); Philip Reese Uhler, and William Lucas Distant (Hemiptera).

Smith's death was tragic. On his walk to work at the Alabama Museum of Natural History, the deaf naturalist, who had recently endured a bout of influenza, was hit by a train. The spot on the University of Alabama campus was known for many years as "Smith's Crossing."

Some of Smith's papers are preserved in the collections of the Geological Survey of Alabama. Unfortunately, the current whereabouts of his field notes are unknown.

== Amelia (Daisy) W. Smith ==
Herbert Smith's collections were, following his marriage, made jointly with his wife Daisy, an expert collector, specimen preparator, and taxidermist. Usually called Daisy, she was the daughter of New York missionaries. The couple had one son.

== Bibliography ==
- Smith. H. H. 1912. Directions for collecting land shells.
- Osborn, H. 1937 Fragments of Entomological History Including Some Personal Recollections of Men and Events. Columbus, Ohio, Published by the Author.
- Osborn, H. 1952 A Brief History of Entomology Including Time of Demosthenes and Aristotle to Modern Times with over Five Hundred Portraits. Columbus, Ohio, The Spahr & Glenn Company.
