= Tornado outbreak of January 12, 2023 =

Tornado outbreak in the Southern US

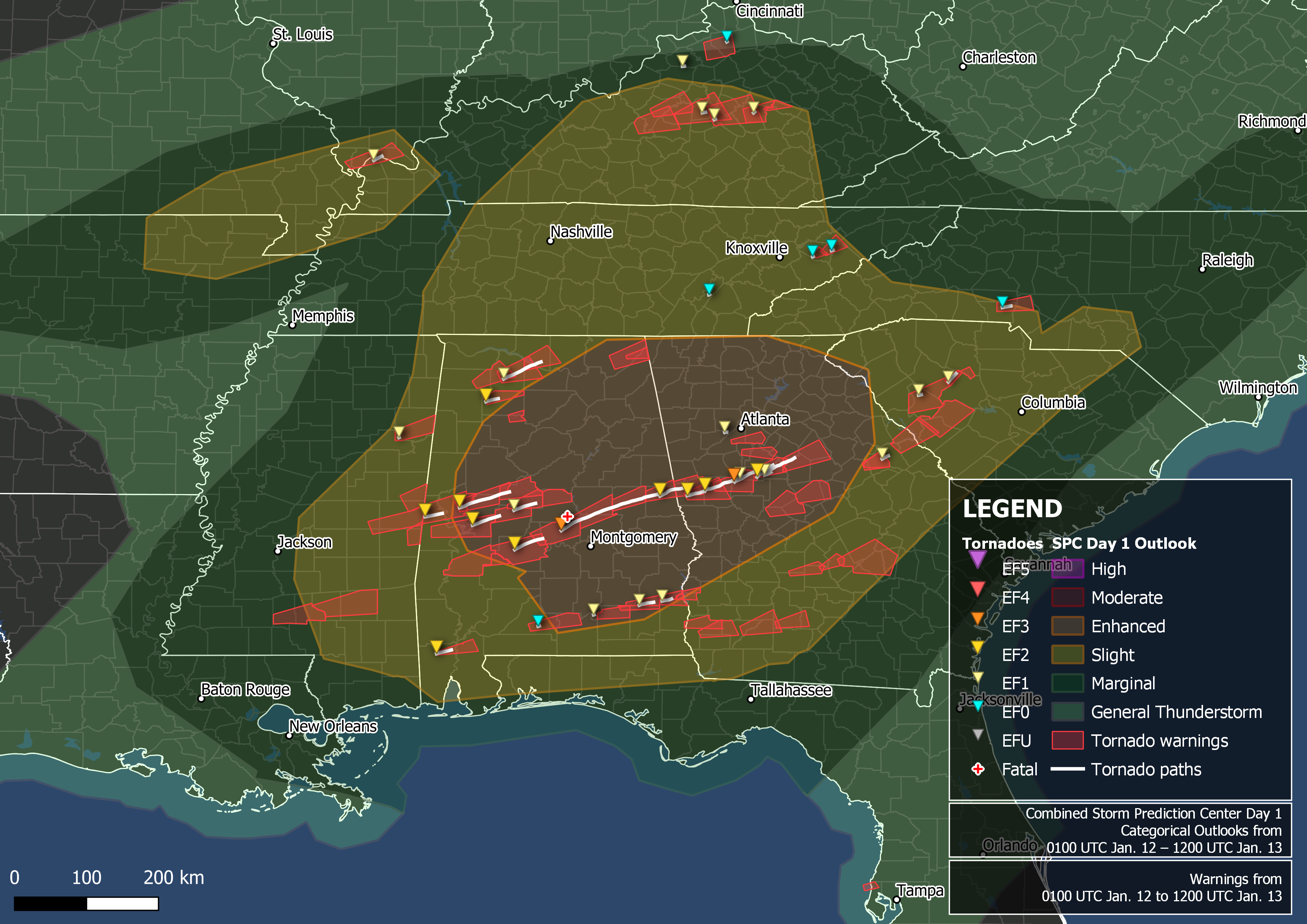
- Map of tornado warnings and confirmed tornadoes from the outbreak.

Meteorological history
- Date: January 12, 2023
- Duration: 15 hours, 24 minutes

Tornado outbreak
- Tornadoes: 42
- Max. rating: EF3 tornado
- Highest winds: 155 mph (249 km/h) (Griffin, Georgia EF3)
- Largest hail: 2 in (5.1 cm) in Elm Park, Arkansas on January 11

Overall effects
- Casualties: 8 fatalities (+1 indirect), 53 injuries
- Damage: $760 million (Estimated economic loss)
- Areas affected: Southeastern United States
- Power outages: 115,000
- Part of the tornado outbreaks of 2023

An early-season tornado outbreak impacted the Southeastern United States on January 12, 2023. The result of a mid-level trough moving through, moisture and the presence of a strong low-level jet aided in the development of numerous severe and tornadic thunderstorms. Early in the outbreak, a strong EF2 tornado caused considerable damage in Winston County, Alabama, while another EF2 tornado struck just south of Greensboro. A destructive high-end EF2 tornado struck Selma, causing widespread damage and two injuries. The same storm produced a long-lived EF3 tornado that moved through or near Old Kingston, Titus, Equality, and Lake Martin, resulting in seven fatalities and several injuries in Autauga County alone. Another EF2 tornado from the storm struck areas in or around Five Points and Standing Rock before crossing into Georgia. After the dissipation of that tornado, nine more tornadoes, five of which were strong, caused heavy damage across west-central Georgia, especially in LaGrange, Griffin, and Experiment, the second one of which was impacted by four tornadoes in the span of 10 minutes, including two that were rated EF2 and EF3 respectively. Another EF2 tornado from the storm caused major damage and another fatality in the Jackson Lake area as well; an indirect death from the tornado also occurred the following day. Elsewhere, other tornadoes caused damage in Sumter and Mobile counties in Alabama, as well as parts of Mississippi, Tennessee, Kentucky, Illinois, and the Carolinas. In all, 42 tornadoes were confirmed.

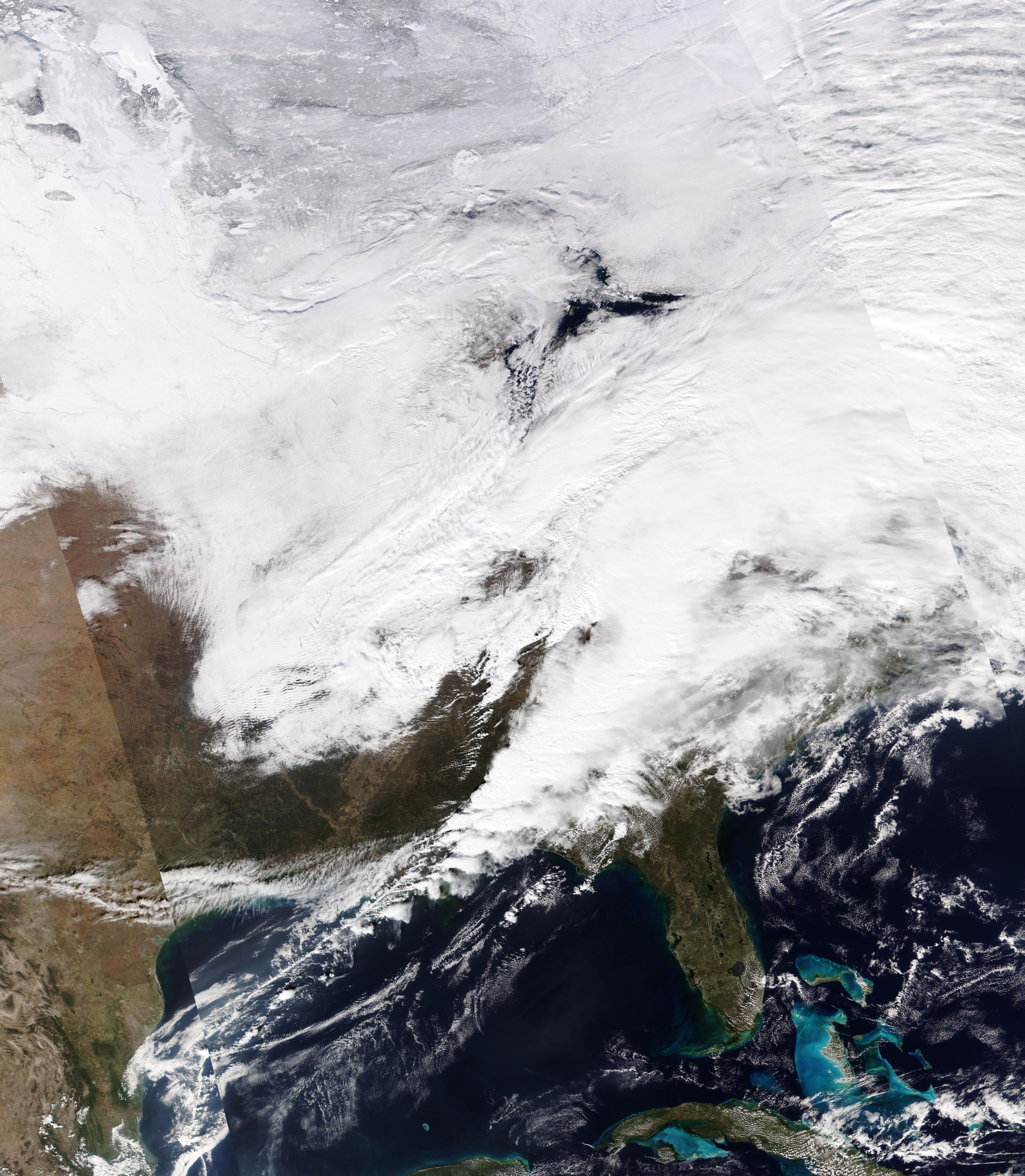
Satellite image of the storm system responsible for the tornado outbreak that occurred on January 12, 2023.

== Meteorological synopsis ==
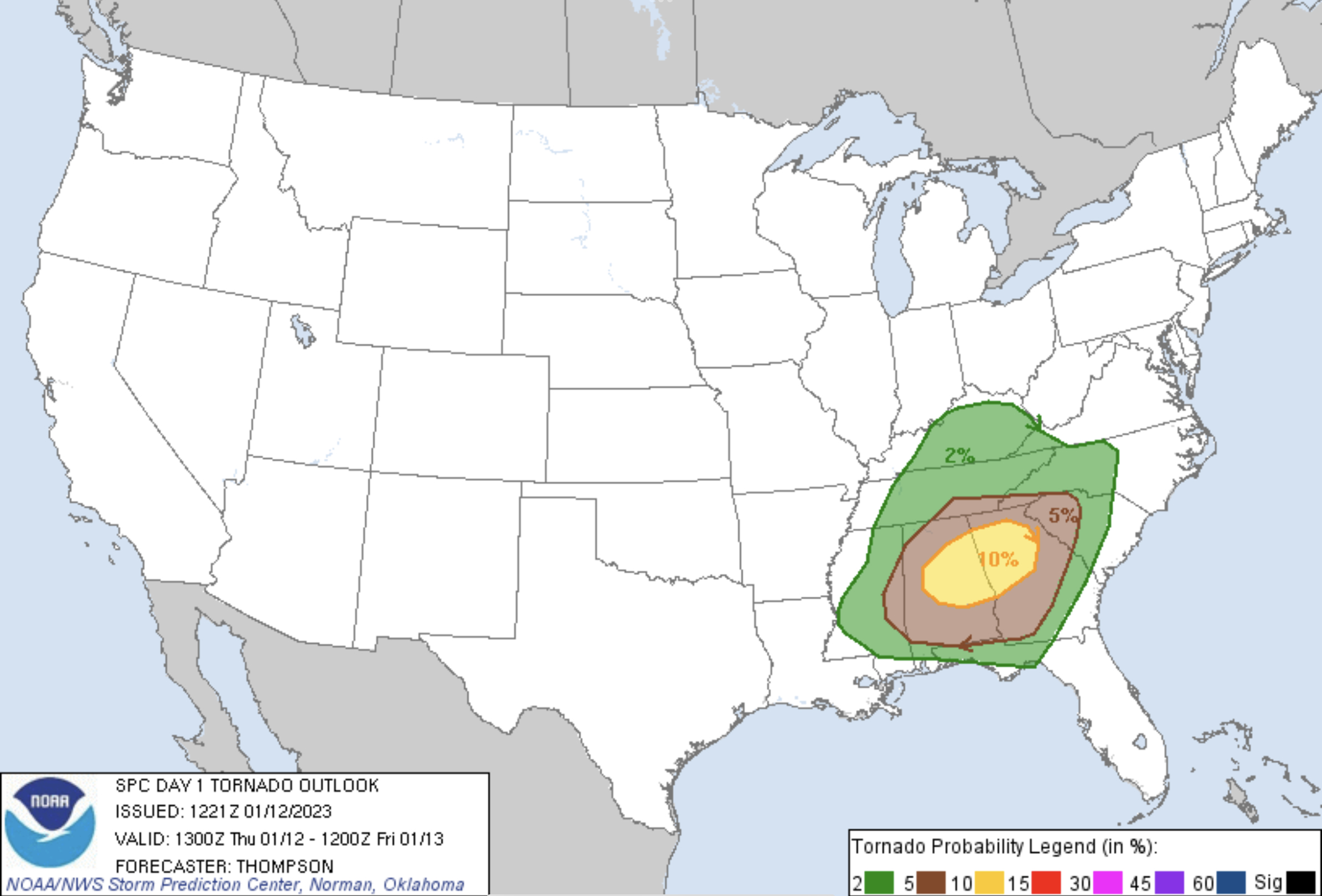
SPC tornado outlook for the morning of January 12 (13:00 UTC)

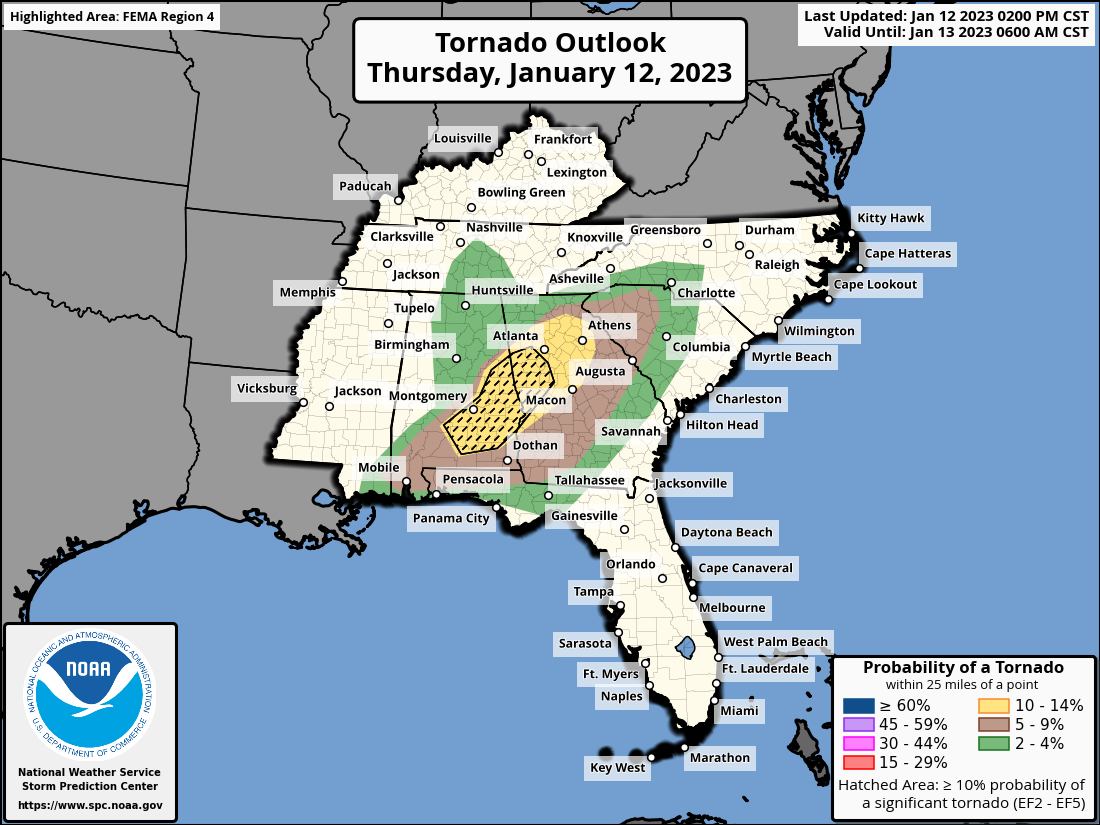
Afternoon outlook update for the evening of January 12 (20:00 UTC)

On January 11, the Storm Prediction Center outlined a level 1/Marginal risk across the Mid-South valid for the overnight and early morning hours. Although the environment was initially capped, conditions were expected to become more conducive for severe weather given the approach of a mid-level trough and a gradually moistening airmass. A more substantive threat for organized severe weather evolved on January 12 and the SPC outlined a level 3/Enhanced risk for 30% risk of damaging winds centered along central and eastern Alabama and northwestern portions of Georgia in their 0600 UTC outlook update. Here, numerical weather prediction models indicated the presence of 6.5 C/km mid-level lapse rates and 500-1000 J/kg convective available potential energy (CAPE) values supportive of transient supercells and bowing segments. However, it also depicted only modest low-level moisture. As such, a large 5% risk for tornadoes was introduced for most of the lower Tennessee Valley, including portions of Mississippi, Alabama, Georgia, southern Tennessee, and northwestern South Carolina for at least a conditional threat of brief tornadoes.

Radar loop of a QLCS and supercells along with severe warnings in the Southeast during the afternoon of January 12

As the day advanced, a more focused corridor for enhanced tornado potential became evident across central Alabama and northwestern Georgia, where effective storm-relative helicity – a measure of the potential for updrafts in supercells – topped 300 m^{2}/s^{2} and CAPE values rose into the 1,000-1,500 J/kg range. The SPC upped the threat for tornadoes to 10% in their 1300 UTC outlook as a result, although the possibility for strong tornadoes, above EF2 intensity, was not included in this outlook as damaging winds were still seen as the primary hazard. However, as the morning advanced, a defined line of severe thunderstorms with embedded supercell structures and multiple discrete supercells developed across the highlighted area. Multiple tornadoes, some of which were significant, touched down and caused extensive damage. Numerous PDS tornado warnings were issued for the towns of Heiberger, Selma, and Movico in Alabama as large and destructive tornadoes were reported. The same storm that hit Selma prompted tornado emergencies for Autauga, Elmore, Chilton, Coosa, and Tallapoosa counties before crossing the Alabama–Georgia border to continue northeast into Georgia. As the event unfolded, the SPC hatched part of the 10% risk for tornadoes in their 20:00 UTC outlook across east-central Alabama and western Georgia, indicating the possibility of strong (EF2+) tornadoes. The long-tracked supercell (originating in Louisiana) that produced the Selma tornado, as well as the deadly Autauga County tornado, produced more tornadoes as it progressed to the northeast; these included an EF2 tornado that crossed from Chambers County, Alabama into Troup County, Georgia, another EF2 tornado that caused severe damage in the southern part of LaGrange, and a third EF2 tornado that caused severe damage in Meriwether County. The storm's mesocyclone than broadened out and produced four tornadoes on the west side of Griffin, including one that was rated high-end EF2 and another that was rated high-end EF3. (Note: 155 mph (249 km/h) is typically not considered “high-end”, but the National Weather Service stated it was high-end saying, “The damage along West Road in particular garnered a slight upgrade in the wind speed to high end EF3 damage per a reanalysis.”) By the evening, the severe storms had entered a less favorable environment and weakened and dissipated during the overnight hours. In total, the National Weather Service issued 221 severe thunderstorm warnings, 68 tornado warnings, and three tornado emergencies during the severe weather outbreak.

== Confirmed tornadoes ==
Confirmed tornadoes by Enhanced Fujita rating
EFU	EF0	EF1	EF2	EF3	EF4	EF5	Total
0	8	21	11	2	0	0	42

=== January 12 event ===
List of confirmed tornadoes – Thursday, January 12, 2023 (Note: All dates are based on the local time zone where the tornado touched down; however, all times are in Coordinated Universal Time for consistency.)
EF#	Location	County / Parish	State	Start Coord.	Time (UTC)	Path length	Max width
EF1	SE of Monkey's Eyebrow, KY to W of Joppa, IL	Ballard (KY), McCracken (KY), Massac (IL)	KY, IL	37.18°N 88.99°W	08:03–08:10	6.5 mi (10.5 km)	200 yd (180 m)
EF1	Pieces of roofing and siding were ripped from a few homes and multiple metal roof panels were blown off two large barns by this low-end EF1 tornado. A church sustained damage to its fencing and the top half of a clay tile silo was destroyed.						
EF1	S of Muldon	Monroe	MS	33.7182°N 88.6716°W	12:29–12:33	2.44 mi (3.93 km)	50 yd (46 m)
EF1	A home sustained loss of its porch and had several windows broken. The garage door and a substantial portion of the roof was also removed. An adjacent large workshop was demolished, another outbuilding was damaged, and two power poles were snapped. Trees were downed as well.						
EF1	Northern Pleasureville	Henry	KY	38.3529°N 85.1327°W	13:47–13:49	1.27 mi (2.04 km)	100 yd (91 m)
EF1	A brief high-end EF1 tornado significantly damaged or destroyed several barns and outbuildings near Pleasureville with debris speared into the ground. In the northern part town, some homes sustained considerable roof damage, one of which also sustained damage to a brick façade exterior wall. Open-air garages and carports were destroyed and one carport was thrown 50 yards (46 m) into trees. Two mobile homes were damaged and one was also moved from its concrete foundation blocks. Power lines were damaged and trees were snapped or uprooted, a few of which landed on homes in town.						
EF1	Northern Harrodsburg	Mercer	KY	37.77°N 84.91°W	14:01–14:05	3.6 mi (5.8 km)	80 yd (73 m)
EF1	One barn was demolished with its roofing material thrown 200 yards (180 m) away, while a second barn sustained significant roof and side panel damage. Two homes also sustained significant roof and gutter damage, with pieces of roofing were impaled into the ground. The tornado moved into the north side of Harrodsburg before dissipating, where two bleachers were flipped at Kenneth D. King Middle School and a power pole was damaged. Numerous trees were snapped, toppled, or twisted along the path as well.						
EF2	E of Delmar to N of Double Springs	Winston	AL	34.1658°N 87.5864°W	14:05–14:18	9.18 mi (14.77 km)	425 yd (389 m)
EF2	A strong tornado destroyed two large chicken coops and three other small buildings at a farm. Five homes were damaged, a detached garage was destroyed, an RV was overturned, and hundreds of trees were downed.						
EF1	SW of Moulton to Northern Decatur to NNW of Mooresville	Lawrence, Morgan, Limestone	AL	34.4494°N 87.3637°W	14:09–14:45	30.32 mi (48.80 km)	325 yd (297 m)
EF1	This weak but long-tracked tornado began over a ridge to the southwest of Moulton, snapping or uprooting numerous trees. A few homes sustained roof damage and one had an associated large metal workshop almost completely destroyed. As the tornado moved directly through Moulton, relatively minor damage occurred at the high school baseball fields and roofing was blown off of Lawrence Medical Center. Tree and roof damage occurred elsewhere in town as well and a motel had much of its sheet metal roofing removed. The tornado caused intermittent minor tree damage as it continued to the northeast into Morgan County, passing south of Trinity. It then moved through the north edge of Decatur, damaging a law enforcement marina, power lines, and several mobile homes at the Kimberly Pines mobile home park. Several large campers were flipped or displaced, trees and fences were downed, and a tractor-trailer was blown off the road along I-65. A couple of homes sustained minor roof damage in town and some metal shipping containers were knocked over. After crossing the Tennessee River, it caused additional damage to the campus of Calhoun Community College and its baseball complex before lifting. One person was injured.						
EF1	NE of Danville	Boyle	KY	37.6878°N 84.7367°W	14:10–14:11	0.84 mi (1.35 km)	125 yd (114 m)
EF1	A large, well-built garage sustained significant damage to its roof and side wall with debris thrown 150 yards (140 m) to the east and impaled into the ground. Another well-built barn lost several of its roof panels and many trees were snapped or uprooted. Widespread straight-line wind damage occurred on either side of the tornado.						
EF0	NW of Williamstown	Grant	KY	38.6581°N 84.5797°W	14:23–14:24	0.27 mi (0.43 km)	50 yd (46 m)
EF0	Several homes sustained roof damage as a result of this high-end EF0 tornado, one of which had a small part of its roof ripped off. A street sign was bent to the ground and several trees were downed. A metal warehouse building had part of its roof lifted and damaged and two door frames on opposite sides of the building were blown in.						
EF2	W of Emelle to S of Gainesville	Sumter	AL	32.7288°N 88.3463°W	15:24–15:40	12.87 mi (20.71 km)	440 yd (400 m)
EF2	This strong tornado touched down just west of Emelle before moving directly through the town. A mobile home and a grain bin were destroyed, homes and outbuildings suffered roof damage, and trees were snapped. Elsewhere along the path, an outbuilding and another mobile home were destroyed, a house had its roof torn off, and a few other homes had roof damage. Numerous trees were snapped or uprooted along the path and one person was injured.						
EF1	NE of Richmond	Madison	KY	37.7719°N 84.2458°W	15:42–15:45	1.2 mi (1.9 km)	80 yd (73 m)
EF1	A hay barn was severely damaged and a dog run and a chicken coop were damaged along with the roofs of several homes. A travel trailer was lifted and tossed over a car which resulted in the travel trailer being flipped on its side and rotated 90 degrees from its original orientation. A pipe and a piece of wood were speared into the ground and many trees were damaged as well.						
EF2	Western Eutaw to N of Stewart to SSE of Duncanville	Greene, Hale, Tuscaloosa, Bibb	AL	32.842°N 87.9158°W	15:54–16:43	39.02 mi (62.80 km)	675 yd (617 m)
EF2	This strong and long-tracked tornado formed from the same storm that spawned the EF2 Emelle tornado. It first touched down in Eutaw, where dozens of homes sustained roof damage, one of which had part of its roof torn off. A rooftop observation structure was taken off of another home and thrown across the street, a field house and some fencing was damaged at Robert Brown Middle School, and many trees were snapped or uprooted in town. The tornado continued east-northeast along the Black Warrior River and struck the small community of Oak Village, where a home sustained destruction of its roof, attached garage, and multiple walls. Other nearby homes were damaged to a lesser degree, outbuildings were destroyed, a dock was thrown, and many trees were snapped or uprooted. The tornado then weakened significantly, causing only intermittent minor tree damage as it passed near Stewart and over SR 69 before re-intensifying as it entered the Talladega National Forest, where numerous trees were downed. After crossing into Tuscaloosa County, the tornado rapidly intensified to its peak intensity of high-end EF2, where a large swath of trees was completely mowed down, with most trees near the center of the path being snapped near the base. The tornado then weakened as it approached and then crossed US 82. Additional tree damage was observed and two homes suffered minor structural damage before the tornado dissipated. The path of the tornado moved over the entire track of an EF1 tornado that struck the same area on November 29, 2022, as well as an EF3 tornado that passed through the Talladega National Forest on March 25, 2021.						
EF0	SSW of Decatur	Meigs	TN	35.4993°N 84.8038°W	16:50–16:51	0.57 mi (0.92 km)	150 yd (140 m)
EF0	A brief, weak tornado embedded within an area of damaging straight-line winds uprooted trees and inflicted roof damage to multiple homes. One person was injured.						
EF2	SSE of Forkland to S of Greensboro to SW of Marion	Hale, Perry	AL	32.6221°N 87.7543°W	16:47–17:15	21.9 mi (35.2 km)	500 yd (460 m)
EF2	This tornado first touched down near the Greene-Hale county line and moved northeastward through unpopulated areas, downing numerous trees. The most significant damage occurred as the tornado passed just south of Greensboro, where a house was unroofed, a single-wide mobile home was rolled and destroyed, numerous trees were snapped or uprooted, and a few other structures sustained less severe damage. Additional tree damage occurred farther along the path before the tornado dissipated.						
EF1	NNE of Heiberger to NNW of Lawley	Perry, Bibb	AL	32.8027°N 87.2421°W	17:30–17:51	17.34 mi (27.91 km)	500 yd (460 m)
EF1	After the previous tornado dissipated, the supercell produced this tornado soon after. It reached EF1 intensity as it snapped and uprooted trees along a ridge. As it neared SR 219 after crossing into Bibb County, it weakened before dissipating after it crossed US 82.						
EF2	NE of Orrville to Selma to SE of Burnsville	Dallas	AL	32.3173°N 87.2278°W	18:04–18:31	23.22 mi (37.37 km)	950 yd (870 m)
EF2	See article on this tornado – Two people were injured.						
EF0	SW of Dandridge	Jefferson	TN	35.9767°N 83.509°W	18:14–18:15	0.43 mi (0.69 km)	30 yd (27 m)
EF0	A brief, weak tornado caused minor tree damage.						
EF2	SSE of Citronelle to Movico	Mobile	AL	31.0196°N 88.203°W	18:15–18:33	11.41 mi (18.36 km)	200 yd (180 m)
EF2	This tornado moved through areas of dense forest near Citronelle, snapping or uprooting many large trees. The tornado struck the small town of Movico before dissipating, tossing and destroying two tied-down mobile homes and snapping several large trees in town.						
EF0	E of Baneberry	Jefferson	TN	36.0514°N 83.2732°W	18:26–18:28	1.11 mi (1.79 km)	100 yd (91 m)
EF0	Trees and power lines were downed.						
EF3	SE of Evergreen to Old Kingston to N of Equality to E of Penton	Autauga, Elmore, Coosa, Tallapoosa, Chambers	AL	32.5212°N 86.7312°W	18:40–20:08	82.31 mi (132.47 km)	1,500 yd (1,400 m)
EF3	7 deaths – See article on this tornado – 16 people were injured.						
EF0	E of Nymph	Conecuh	AL	31.3616°N 86.9346°W	19:54–19:55	0.94 mi (1.51 km)	100 yd (91 m)
EF0	Several trees were uprooted and several tree limbs were downed.						
EF2	SW of Five Points, AL to NW of LaGrange, GA	Chambers (AL), Troup (GA)	AL, GA	32.9871°N 85.4131°W	20:08–20:31	20.74 mi (33.38 km)	1,600 yd (1,500 m)
EF2	This large and strong tornado touched down as the long-tracked, deadly EF3 Old Kingston tornado was dissipating. It initially caused sporadic tree damage as it moved northeastward from near White Plains into Five Points, where a home sustained minor damage and trees were uprooted. Northeast of Five Points, the tornado widened and strengthened, snapping and uprooting a large swath of trees and causing roof damage to a house and some barns. It strengthened further near Standing Rock, where a mobile home was completely destroyed, other mobile homes were pushed off their foundations or suffered major damage, a few frame homes had roof damage, and large tree trunks were snapped. The tornado moved over West Point Lake along the state line into Georgia, where many additional large trees were snapped or uprooted and some homes suffered roof damage. The tornado then steadily weakened, causing additional tree damage and inflicting roof shingle and gutter damage to a few homes before dissipating.						
EF1	NE of Red Level to N of Gantt	Covington	AL	31.43°N 86.57°W	20:23-20:28	5.05 mi (8.13 km)	200 yd (180 m)
EF1	A tornado discovered by satellite imagery tracked east across forested areas. It produced intermittent tree damage before peaking where a narrow swath of forest was significantly damaged. The tornado then quickly weakened and lifted, with damage fading from view on imagery. Initially rated EFU due to limited data, later high-resolution analysis determined it reached high-end EF1 intensity in July 2025.						
EF1	Southern Mableton	Douglas, Cobb	GA	33.783°N 84.607°W	20:30–20:33	1.46 mi (2.35 km)	150 yd (140 m)
EF1	A high-end EF1 tornado quickly formed within a line of severe thunderstorms in the western suburbs of Atlanta. An industrial automotive business lost a portion of its exterior wall and dozens of trees were knocked down onto homes, some of which sustained roof and structural damage.						
EF2	Southern LaGrange to Mountville to NW of Greenville	Troup, Meriwether	GA	32.9927°N 85.0735°W	20:34–20:47	18.83 mi (30.30 km)	1,060 yd (970 m)
EF2	This large, strong tornado was produced by the Selma supercell and first touched down in the southern part of LaGrange, where several metal industrial buildings and warehouses were damaged or destroyed. Roughly one-third of one large warehouse was completely destroyed, with anchor bolts bent or pulled out of the concrete foundation. More than 30 homes sustained significant damage in residential areas of town as multiple homes had roofs and some exterior walls torn off, and a few sustained the destruction of their second stories. Many other homes in LaGrange had considerable roof, siding, and window damage, debris was scattered throughout neighborhoods, and many trees were snapped or uprooted. The tornado then weakened as it exited town and moved to the east-northeast, downing some trees and tree limbs. More trees were snapped or uprooted in Mountville, where four people were injured. As the tornado crossed into Meriwether County, numerous more trees were downed before lifting.						
EF2	NE of Mountville to NW of Hollonville	Meriwether, Pike	GA	33.0517°N 84.8527°W	20:45–21:17	24.55 mi (39.51 km)	1,500 yd (1,400 m)
EF2	This large, long-tracked tornado touched down as the previous EF2 tornado was dissipating. A double-wide mobile home had its roof blown off and was pushed 20 yards (18 m) off its foundation, tearing the structure in half, while two single-wide mobile homes were completely destroyed. Some other mobile homes were also heavily damaged and pushed off their foundations, a frame home had its roof torn off, and a large two-story barn was destroyed. Thousands of large trees were snapped or uprooted along the path, including within the small community of Alps. Some of the trees landed on houses and caused major damage. The tornado dissipated as the EF3 Griffin tornado became the dominant circulation within the parent supercell.						
EF1	WNW of Pine Level	Crenshaw	AL	31.505°N 86.2428°W	20:46–20:47	0.35 mi (0.56 km)	80 yd (73 m)
EF1	A brief tornado snapped or uprooted dozens of trees.						
EF3	W of Hollonville to Experiment to NNE of Locust Grove	Pike, Spalding, Henry	GA	33.1654°N 84.4785°W	21:10–21:45	32.8 mi (52.8 km)	2,200 yd (2,000 m)
EF3	See section on this tornado – 18 people were injured.						
EF2	NW of Hollonville to W of Griffin	Spalding, Pike	GA	33.1959°N 84.4845°W	21:13–21:22	9.26 mi (14.90 km)	1,000 yd (910 m)
EF2	This large tornado snapped or uprooted hundreds of trees, destroyed outbuildings, and damaged a house at the beginning of its path. It then merged with the 2116 UTC EF1 tornado, which increased its intensity to high-end EF2. Several homes and outbuildings were heavily damaged or destroyed and hundreds of additional trees were snapped or uprooted. The tornado then caused further tree damage along with minor to moderate damage to homes before being absorbed by the EF3 Griffin tornado.						
EF1	Mayfield to Southern Camak to NW of Thomson	Hancock, Warren, McDuffie	GA	33.3632°N 82.8028°W	21:15–21:39	18.33 mi (29.50 km)	150 yd (140 m)
EF1	This tornado first touched down in Mayfield where a few trees and tree limbs were downed. The tornado strengthened to high-end EF1 intensity and moved to the northeast, snapping and uprooting many trees, one of which fell onto a house. Two old outbuildings were destroyed as well. As the tornado struck the outskirts of Camak, it uprooted several trees and damaged an old cinder block building. Elsewhere along the path, a metal work shed and an outdoor kitchen were destroyed and several homes had roof and fascia damage.						
EF1	N of Hollonville	Spalding, Pike	GA	33.2147°N 84.4352°W	21:16–21:20	2.66 mi (4.28 km)	300 yd (270 m)
EF1	This tornado snapped trees before being absorbed by the 2113 UTC EF2 tornado. A barn was also damaged, although this may have been due to the EF3 Griffin tornado and not this one.						
EF1	NE of Hollonville to W of Griffin	Pike, Spalding	GA	33.1958°N 84.4144°W	21:17–21:24	6.03 mi (9.70 km)	800 yd (730 m)
EF1	This tornado formed just to the east of the 2113 UTC EF2 tornado. It damaged homes and storage buildings, destroyed storage bins, and snapped or uprooted hundreds of trees before being absorbed by the EF3 Griffin tornado.						
EF2	ESE of East Griffin to Jenkinsburg to S of Mansfield	Spalding, Butts, Newton, Jasper	GA	33.2252°N 84.2021°W	21:27–22:01	31.99 mi (51.48 km)	1,400 yd (1,300 m)
EF2	1 death – See section on this tornado – 10 people were injured.						
EF1	NE of Ariton to Blue Springs	Barbour	AL	31.625°N 85.673°W	21:25–21:38	10.96 mi (17.64 km)	900 yd (820 m)
EF1	Hundreds of trees were downed or damaged, including one that fell on a home. Farm structures were damaged as well.						
EF1	SSW of Jenkinsburg	Butts	GA	33.2502°N 84.1095°W	21:35–21:38	5.81 mi (9.35 km)	150 yd (140 m)
EF1	This low-end EF1 tornado was on the ground simultaneously with the EF3 Griffin tornado and the EF2 Jenkinsburg tornado. It formed south of SR 16 before crossing I-75 and tracking along SR 16 for the rest of its path. A large warehouse had sections of its roof torn off and thrown northeastward into the parking lot. Many trees were snapped or uprooted as well.						
EF0	NE of Pisgah	Jackson	AL	34.7083°N 85.8125°W	21:38–21:41	2.34 mi (3.77 km)	70 yd (64 m)
EF0	A farm building and a home suffered roof damage and trees were uprooted.						
EF1	W of Edwin to N of Lawrenceville	Henry	AL	31.6778°N 85.3872°W	21:45–21:56	7.07 mi (11.38 km)	150 yd (140 m)
EF1	A low-end EF1 tornado inflicted heavy roof and structural damage to several barns and outbuildings and removed some roof shingles from a home. Many trees were downed as well.						
EF1	NE of Jenkinsburg to Worthville to NW of Prospect	Butts, Newton	GA	33.3649°N 83.9775°W	21:49–21:57	9.93 mi (15.98 km)	500 yd (460 m)
EF1	This tornado formed from the remnant circulation of the EF3 Griffin tornado and tracked just to the west of the EF2 Jenkinsburg tornado. A barn was destroyed, a car wash was partially unroofed, and a greenhouse and a few homes were damaged. Many trees were snapped and uprooted along the path as well.						
EF1	Joanna to W of Whitmire	Laurens	SC	34.4123°N 81.8154°W	22:42–22:52	9.05 mi (14.56 km)	100 yd (91 m)
EF1	A weak, but extended-tracked tornado touched down in Joanna, destroying a car wash, and damaging the garage door of a fire station. Continuing northeast of town, the tornado strengthened and snapped or uprooted numerous trees, including some that fell on houses. The tornado then knocked down some more large trees as it crossed SC 72, before dissipating after crossing a railway track in Sumter National Forest.						
EF0	Southern Stanley	Gaston	NC	35.342°N 81.14°W	23:10–23:18	6.06 mi (9.75 km)	25 yd (23 m)
EF0	A weak tornado caused scattered tree damage along its path through the south side of Stanley.						
EF1	N of Greenwood	Greenwood	SC	34.247°N 82.186°W	23:23–23:26	2.07 mi (3.33 km)	75 yd (69 m)
EF1	Many trees were downed at the Greenwood County Airport, and in nearby neighborhoods as well. Some trees fell on homes, two of which were significantly damaged.						
EF1	E of Pineview	Wilcox	GA	32.066°N 83.381°W	00:00–00:05	3.13 mi (5.04 km)	100 yd (91 m)
EF1	This tornado struck a farmstead where several large trees were uprooted and a silo was moved and twisted off its foundation, damaging several metal bracers. A barn and two sheds were destroyed and the home on the property suffered moderate structural damage with several structural pillars and columns displaced. The tornado, which was on the ground simultaneously with the tornado below, moved into inaccessible areas and dissipated.						
EF0	E of Pineview	Wilcox	GA	32.086°N 83.392°W	00:03–00:07	2.2 mi (3.5 km)	200 yd (180 m)
EF0	This tornado was on the ground simultaneously with the tornado above. Dozens of trees were snapped along the path before the tornado moved into inaccessible areas and dissipated.						

=== Selma, Alabama ===
Selma, Alabama
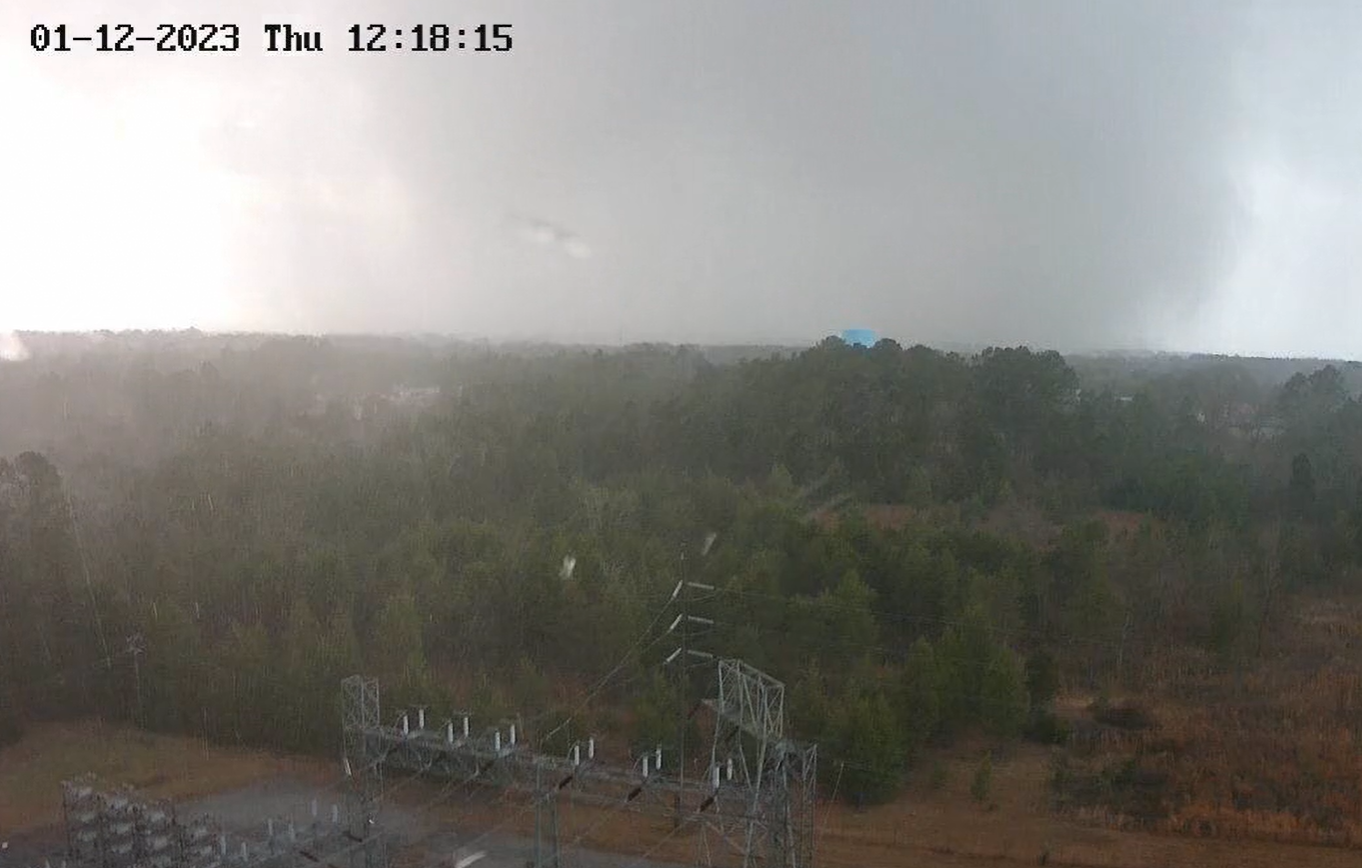
- The tornado at EF2 intensity in downtown Selma, seen from an Alabama Power sky camera.

Meteorological history
- Formed: January 12, 2023, 12:04 p.m. CST (UTC−06:00)
- Dissipated: January 12, 2023, 12:31 p.m. CST (UTC−06:00)
- Duration: 27 minutes

EF2 tornado
- on the Enhanced Fujita scale
- Highest winds: 130 mph (210 km/h)

Overall effects
- Casualties: 2 injuries

This large, destructive high-end EF2 tornado caused major damage in the city of Selma. The tornado first touched just northeast of Orrville near the intersection of SR 22 and County Road 999 at 12:04 p.m. CST (18:04 UTC). Moving northeastward along SR 22, the tornado damaged several mobile homes and pushed them off their foundations. A frame home sustained minor damage, some trees and power poles were downed in this area as well, and damage along this initial segment of the path was rated EF1. EF1 damage continued as the tornado impacted Beloit, where a church had its steeple and part of its roof blown off, homes sustained roof damage, and trees were snapped. After causing additional tree damage along SR 22, the tornado began to rapidly intensify as it approached the southwestern city limits of Selma, and many large hardwood and softwood trees were snapped at EF2 intensity in this area. The now strong tornado then crossed SR 219 as it entered the southwest side of Selma, causing significant damage along Old Orville Road. Multiple houses were heavily damaged and had their roofs torn off along this corridor, and a few sustained some loss of exterior walls. Severe tree damage occurred as well, as many large trees were snapped or uprooted in residential areas. Reaching high-end EF2 strength, the tornado struck the Crosspoint Christian Daycare along Cooper Drive, inflicting severe structural damage to the building, which sustained collapse of its roof and several brick exterior walls. At the time of the tornado, 70 children were inside the daycare along with staff workers. One baby received a minor cut from the tornado, with no other injuries occurring at that location. The nearby Crosspoint Christian Church had a substantial amount of metal roofing torn off, and debris was scattered throughout the area. EF2 damage continued beyond this point as the tornado moved northeastward along West Dallas Avenue, inflicting significant structural damage to homes. An ophthalmologist's office near Office Park Circle was severely damaged and had much of its roof torn off, while many large trees were snapped or uprooted, some of which landed on houses.

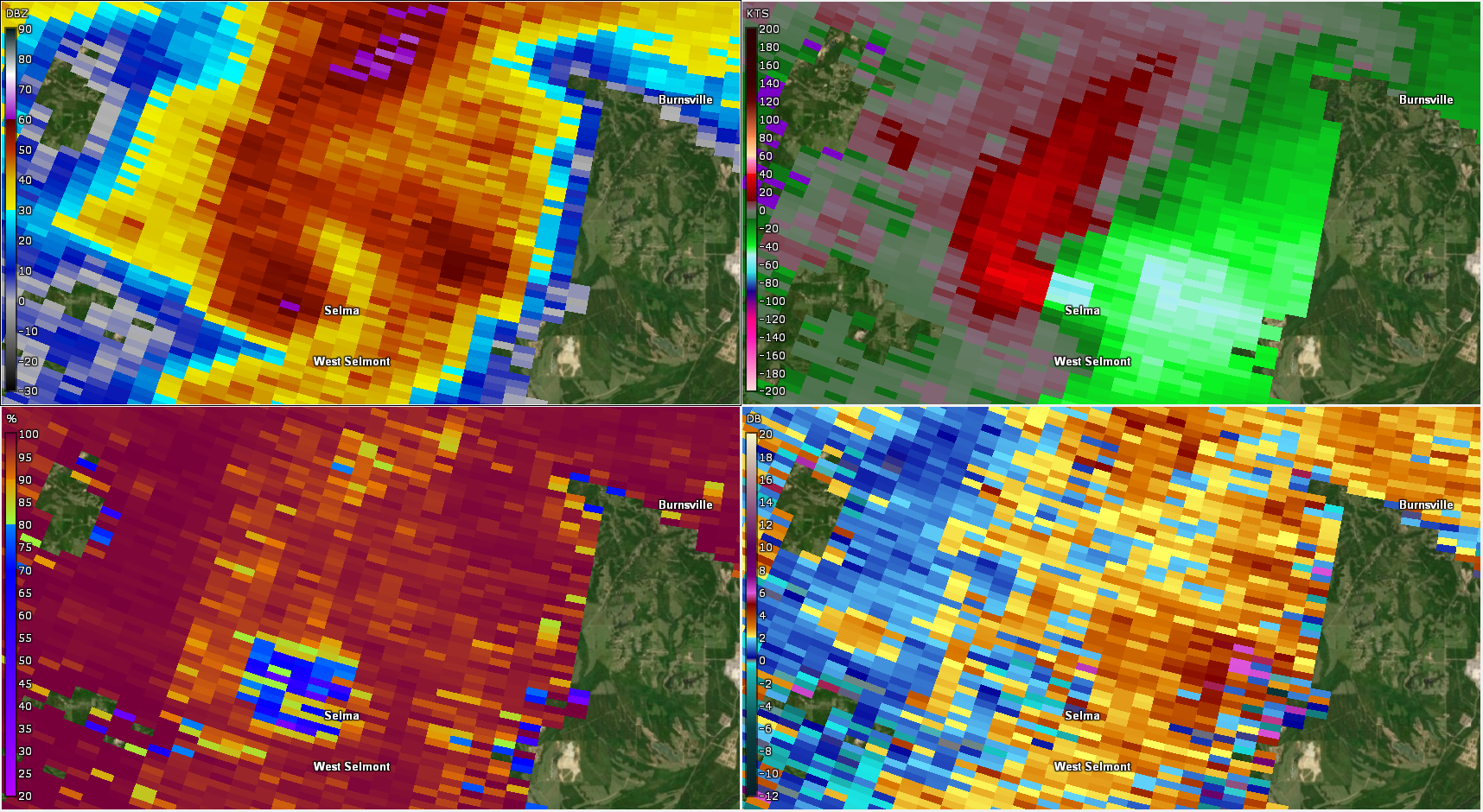
NEXRAD radar scan of the tornado as it was hitting Selma

Further to the northeast, high-end EF2 damage occurred at the Selma Country Club, where the clubhouse building suffered major damage to its roof and exterior walls, a few other buildings on the property also had extensive damage, several extremely large hardwood trees were blown down, and many softwood trees were snapped. Maintaining high-end EF2 intensity, the tornado then struck the northern part of downtown Selma. Damage here mainly consisted of numerous of trees being snapped or uprooted, some of which fell on homes, and many homes and other buildings that had their roofs and some exterior walls removed. A couple of older residences that were built on brick piling foundations collapsed, cars were flipped, signs were destroyed, and numerous power poles were snapped. The historic Reformed Presbyterian Church was badly damaged, and its adjacent church school was almost completely destroyed. As the tornado crossed over Broad St (US 80/SR 22), a strip mall had much of its roof torn off, and a nearby metal warehouse building sustained major damage, with metal framing being twisted and failure of x-braces observed. Apartment buildings were also badly damaged, and debris from structures was strewn across streets, or left tangled in power lines or wrapped around trees. Past the downtown area, the tornado weakened slightly to mid-range EF2 strength as it crossed Marie Foster Street and moved through neighborhoods in the northeastern part of Selma, where many homes and apartment buildings had roofs and exterior walls torn off, and many trees and power lines were downed. Crossing SR 41, the tornado moved out of Selma and maintained EF2 intensity as it moved to the northeast, though damage in this area was limited to downed trees. As it crossed SR 14, an outbuilding was completely destroyed and a metal free-standing pole was bent to the ground, with damage in this area being rated EF2. Some re-intensification was observed as the tornado then impacted a small residential area along Parkway Drive, where a few houses had roofs torn off with some collapse of exterior walls noted. Another outbuilding in this area was completely destroyed, trees were downed, and damage was rated high-end EF2. Just past this area, the tornado weakened to EF1 strength as it impacted a FEMA trailer storage facility along Selfield Road, where multiple unanchored trailers were damaged, flipped, or destroyed. A final area of EF2 damage occurred nearby, where the Dallas County Jail suffered extensive damage to its roof and fencing. Weakening back to EF1 intensity, the tornado then crossed SR 14 again, snapping trees and damaging some outbuildings. The tornado weakened further as it passed south of Manila, causing minor EF0 tree damage along this segment of the path. It inflicted EF0 damage to a house and dissipated as it crossed SR 140 to the southeast of Burnsville at 12:31 p.m. CST (18:31 UTC), just before reaching the Autauga County line. The tornado was on the ground for 23.22 miles (37.37 km), resulting in two injuries.

=== Old Kingston–Titus–Equality–Lake Martin–Penton, Alabama ===
Old Kingston–Titus–Equality–Lake Martin–Penton, Alabama
- The tornado as it tracked through rural portions of northwestern Elmore County, Alabama.

Meteorological history
- Formed: January 12, 2023, 12:40 p.m. CST (UTC−06:00)
- Dissipated: January 12, 2023, 2:08 p.m. CST (UTC−06:00)
- Duration: 1 hour, 28 minutes

EF3 tornado
- on the Enhanced Fujita scale
- Highest winds: 150 mph (240 km/h)

Overall effects
- Casualties: 7 fatalities, 16 injuries

A strong and long-tracked EF3 tornado began in Autauga County, Alabama, nine minutes after the EF2 Selma tornado dissipated. The large multiple-vortex tornado prompted the issuance of three tornado emergencies just north of areas struck by tornadoes 10 days earlier. The tornado first touched down near Independence at 12:40 p.m. CST (18:40 UTC). It initially only caused very minor EF0 tree limb damage as it moved northeastward through sparsely populated areas. After crossing US 82, the tornado quickly intensified to EF1 strength as it moved northeastward along County Road 40, heavily damaging a home, rolling a shed across the road, and causing tree damage. Continuing northeastward into the Old Kingston community, the tornado rapidly intensified to EF3 strength as it crossed County Road 43. Several mobile homes were obliterated and swept away, with debris being scattered long distances across fields. A frame from one mobile home was thrown 250 yards (230 m) into an open field. The tornado threw multiple vehicles, tossing one truck 120 yards (110 m) through the air and leaving a crater where it impacted the ground. Many large trees were snapped and denuded as well, with some debarked observed. Just to the northeast, the tornado crossed Sandy Ridge Road, where numerous double-wide and single-wide mobile homes were completely obliterated, more vehicles were tossed, and many trees were shredded and partially debarked. Five people were killed in this area in different manufactured homes that were swept away. EF3 damage continued just northeast of this area, as a large metal power pole was bent to the ground near County Road 21. Two nearby frame homes had much of their roofs torn off, with the damage to those residences rated EF2. Next encountering County Road 140, the now large tornado continued to produce EF3 damage as more mobile homes were completely swept away. The contents of at least four homes were blown over 100 yards (91 m) to the north, leaving only empty foundations behind. Two more fatalities occurred in separate homes that were obliterated. The tornado continued to throw vehicles considerable distances, including one pickup truck that had its cab separated from the bed, while many trees were snapped or sheared off. This included entire stands of pine trees that were mowed down east of County Road 140 and along County Road 42. Based on the damage scene and contextual evidence, it was acknowledged by damage surveyors that the tornado may have had stronger winds here. However, as the only structures that were destroyed in this area were mobile homes, the highest wind speed estimate that could be applied was 150 mph (240 km/h), which is mid-range EF3.

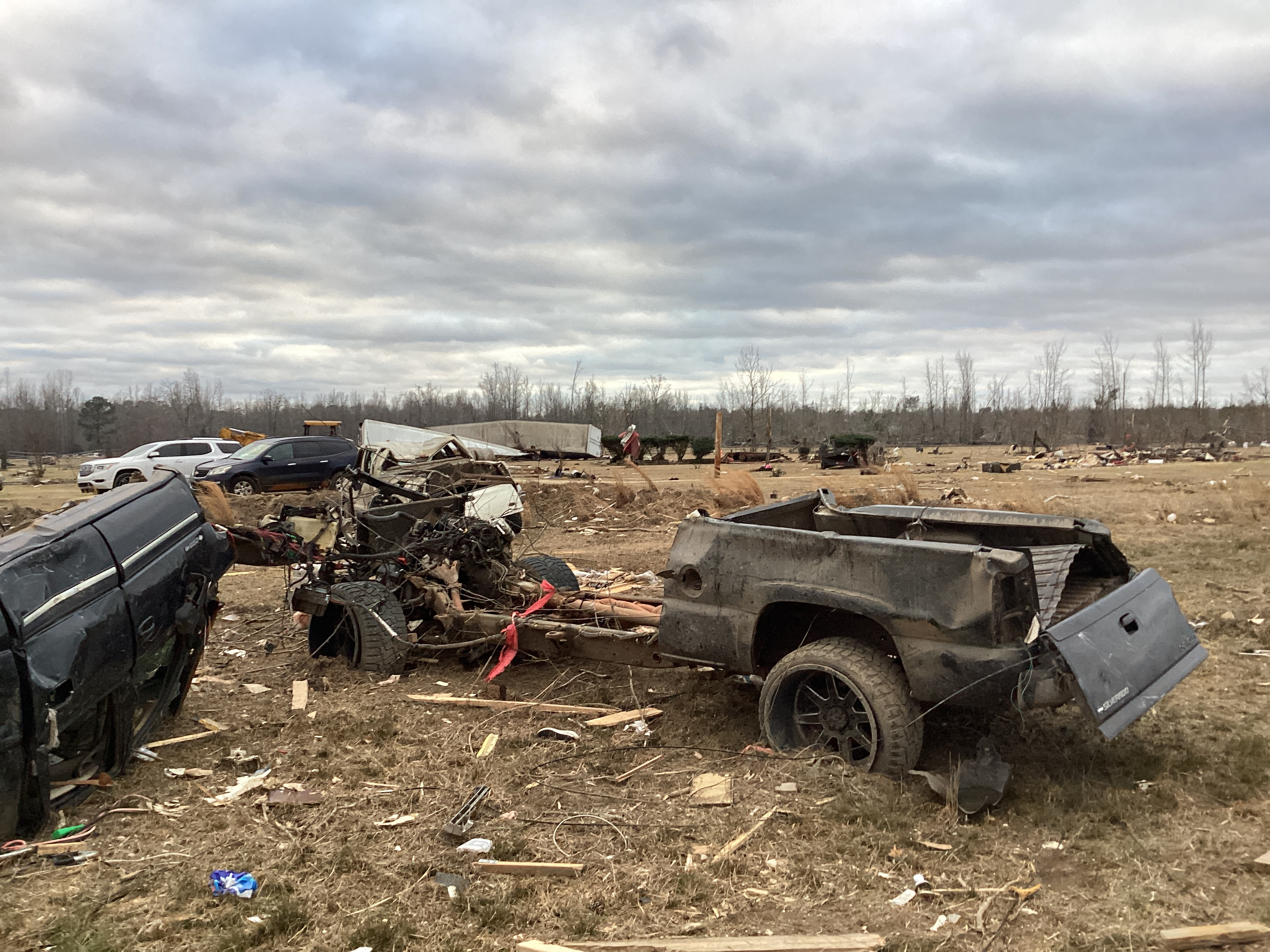
A pick-up truck in Old Kingston that was thrown and had its cab violently ripped out

Beyond this point, the tornado narrowed some, but maintained low-end EF3 intensity as it moved northeastward, snapping and debarking dozens of hardwood trees. A two-story home on the west side of County Road 57 had much of its second floor destroyed, with multiple exterior walls knocked down on both the first and second floors. The tornado weakened slightly to high-end EF2 intensity after crossing the road, tearing the roofs off of two site-built homes and destroying a large outbuilding structure. A few other homes were damaged to a lesser degree in this area, and large trees were snapped. After downing additional trees, the tornado continued at high-end EF2 strength as it crossed over County Road 62. A house in this area sustained major structural damage, losing its roof and some exterior walls, with several walls from the central part of the house being destroyed and strewn into the back yard. A nearby mobile home was destroyed at high-end EF1 strength, and some other site-built homes sustained less severe damage. The tornado then briefly weakened to high-end EF1 intensity, with damage being limited to downed trees, but reached EF2 intensity again and grew in size as it crossed I-65 and US 31 in the Pine Level community south of Marbury. Several homes sustained roof damage, outbuildings were damaged or destroyed, a mobile home was rolled off its foundation and destroyed, and numerous trees were snapped or uprooted in this area. Continuing to the northeast, the tornado produced additional EF2 damage as it moved through the Pine Flat community. Multiple site-built homes had their roofs partially or completely removed, and a mobile home was swept away and destroyed. The Wadsworth Baptist Church, housed in a large metal building, sustained considerable damage as well. Additional EF2 damage continued beyond Pine Flat as a house had its roof torn off and another home sustained roof and exterior wall loss. Numerous trees were snapped or uprooted in this area, and two mobile homes were destroyed.

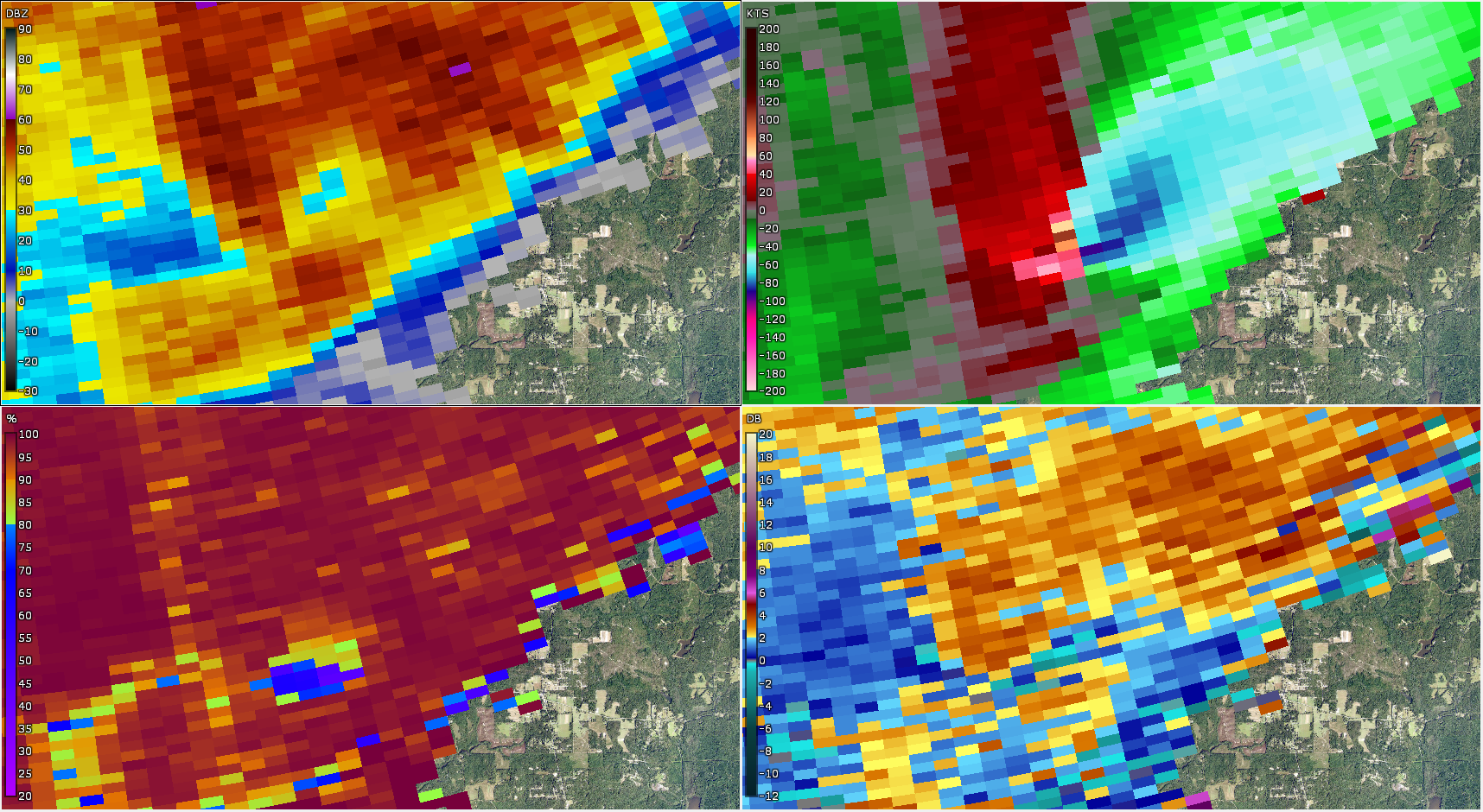
NEXRAD radar scan of the tornado at peak intensity in Old Kingston

Continuing at EF2 strength, the tornado crossed into northwestern Elmore County and passed near Lightwood, where more homes were mostly or entirely unroofed, mobile homes were destroyed, and many trees were downed. The tornado briefly weakened to EF1 strength as it crossed the Coosa River, downing multiple trees in a wooded area before it reached EF2 intensity again north of Titus, snapping countless pine trees and unroofing another home as it crossed County Road 29 and Grays Ferry Road. The tornado again weakened to EF1 intensity, downing more trees as it crossed into Coosa County. The tornado then became slightly larger and re-intensified back to EF2 strength as it crossed over US 231, snapping many large trees and inflicting heavy roof damage to a home along County Road 304. Just past this point, the tornado rapidly intensified again as it approached Equality, and a large swath of trees was completely mowed down along McKissick Road. All trees in the center of the path were snapped close to their bases, and some debarking was noted. This area of intense tree damage was given a low-end EF3 rating. The tornado then widened some more as it continued northeastward, causing EF2-level tree damage before strengthening back to EF3 intensity along County Roads 14 and 18 northwest of Equality. Several vehicles were moved or flipped, numerous trees were snapped, and a few site-built homes sustained major structural damage, including a poorly anchored house that was completely leveled.

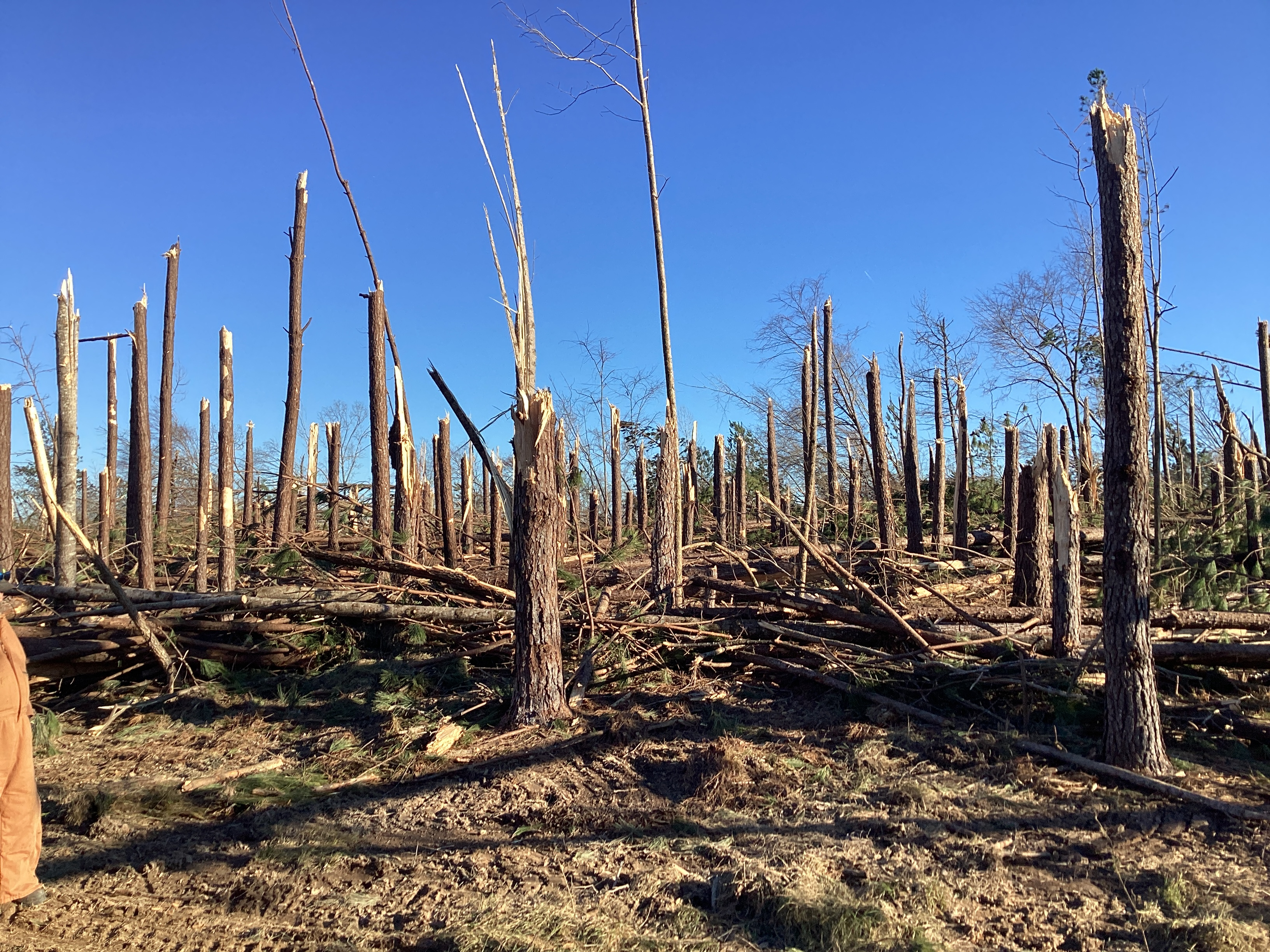
Intense EF3-rated tree damage west of Equality

The tornado then quickly narrowed and weakened back to EF1 intensity as it crossed over SR 9 to the north of Equality, where a mobile home and a site-built home suffered roof damage. The tornado continued into Tallapoosa County as it maintained EF1 strength. Damage along this portion of the path was almost entirely limited to downed trees, though at least one home sustained minor roof damage. The tornado then grew in size again and caused additional EF1 damage as it moved through Wind Creek State Park and over Elkahatchee Creek just south of Alexander City, snapping more trees before shrinking and re-strengthening back to EF2 intensity as it crossed the Tallapoosa River along the north side of Lake Martin near the US 280 bridge. Many homes were damaged at this location, including several that had their roofs ripped off, and a few that had some loss of exterior walls as well. Boat houses were also destroyed, and dozens of large hardwood trees were snapped and uprooted. The heavy damage in this area was partly attributed to the tornado's interaction with the lake surface, as well as the exposed nature of the homes, since most of the structures inland seemed to be "sheltered" by adjacent heavily wooded areas. This was also the last area of EF2 damage from the tornado. After crossing US 280 near Sturdivant, the tornado weakened significantly to EF0 strength, snapping tree branches and uprooting softwood trees. South of Horseshoe Bend National Military Park near Sessions, the tornado reached EF1 intensity again, snapping or uprooting several trees, damaging outbuildings, and inflicting minor damage to homes. The tornado then weakened back to EF0 intensity, inflicting minor damage to trees and mobile homes several miles south of Daviston, before restrengthening back to EF1 intensity for the last time as it moved into Chambers County, snapping or uprooting several trees. The tornado then weakened to high-end EF0 strength south of Union Hill. It continued to inflict minor damage to outbuildings and downed more trees before striking Penton, where some EF0 tree damage occurred. The tornado then dissipated just east of Penton, 3.5 miles (5.6 km) west-northwest of White Plains at 2:08 p.m. CST (20:08 UTC) after traveling 82.31 miles (132.47 km), which resulted in this becoming the sixth longest-tracked tornado in Alabama history. A total of seven people were killed by this tornado, and at least 16 others were injured.

=== Hollonville–Griffin–Experiment–Locust Grove, Georgia ===
Hollonville–Griffin–Experiment–Locust Grove, Georgia
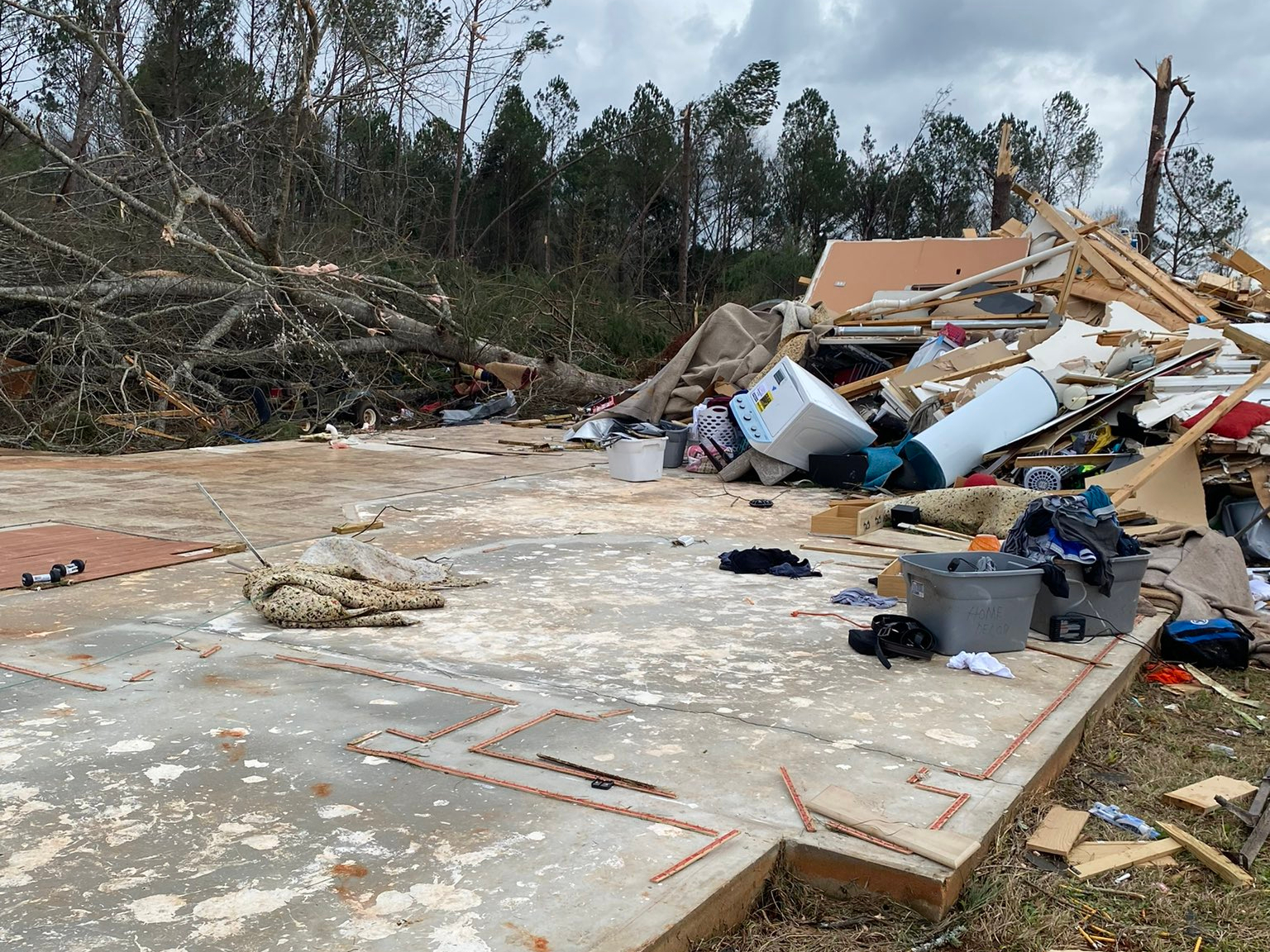
- EF3 damage to a poorly anchored home that was swept off its foundation at the west edge of Griffin.

Meteorological history
- Formed: January 12, 2023, 4:10 p.m. EST (UTC−05:00)
- Dissipated: January 12, 2023, 4:45 p.m. EST (UTC−05:00)
- Duration: 35 minutes

EF3 tornado
- on the Enhanced Fujita scale
- Highest winds: 155 mph (249 km/h)

Overall effects
- Casualties: 18 injuries

As the EF2 Alps tornado was occluding and weakening, a new circulation southeast of it within the same parent supercell produced this large, intense rain-wrapped tornado that touched down just a mile west of the community of Hollonville in Pike County along SR 362 at 4:10 p.m. EST (21:11 UTC). After causing EF0 tree and roof damage at the beginning of its path, the tornado strengthened to EF1 intensity as it continued to the northeast, snapping and uprooting numerous trees. Around this time, the broad mesocyclone responsible for this tornado produced three other tornadoes in quick succession, while this tornado abruptly turned to the north-northeast and weakened as crossed into Spalding County, producing only sporadic EF0 tree damage. As it reached Blanton Mill Road, the tornado made a sharp to turn to the east and strengthened back to EF1 strength, snapping and uprooting trees and causing major roof damage to an outbuilding on Rover-Zetella Road as it entered the west edge of Griffin. As it began grow in size after crossing the road, the tornado rapidly intensified to high-end EF3 strength as it entered a small residential subdivision along West Road and Kendall Drive. Several homes were either heavily damaged or completely destroyed in this area, including two poorly anchored homes that were leveled and swept off their foundations. A resident inside one of the homes took shelter in a bathtub which, along with all the plumbing, was ripped off the foundation and thrown into nearby woods, though he was not injured. Intense tree damage was also noted in this area, and winds were estimated to have reached 155 mph (249 km/h). The tornado then absorbed two of the other tornadoes to its south and weakened to EF2 strength, but grew to over a mile-wide as it crossed SR 16 and moved through additional residential areas in the western part of Griffin. Many trees were downed, and homes in neighborhoods in The Club at Shoal Creek area and along North Pine Hill Drive sustained EF1 to EF2 damage. Maintaining its strength, the tornado then moved into Experiment, an unincorporated community located on the north side of Griffin near the University of Georgia campus.

NEXRAD velocity imagery of the tornadoes near Griffin, Georgia. The circulation in the red circle is the one that produced the main EF3 Griffin tornado.

Multiple homes and some businesses in Experiment suffered extensive damage, with the damage in this area being rated EF1 to EF2. Many power lines and trees were downed, and several large trees fell onto homes, causing major structural damage. A Hobby Lobby had a large portion of its roof torn off, and also sustained partial collapse of masonry exterior walls on the northeast side of the building. Debris was strewn throughout the area, and multiple vehicles were flipped and tossed. Damage to the Hobby Lobby building was rated high-end EF2, with winds estimated at 130 mph (210 km/h). The UGA campus suffered EF0 damage, and a weather station in the area recorded a 73.9 mph (118.9 km/h) wind gust as the storm passed by, while another at the UGA Dempsey Farm recorded a wind gust of 81.1 mph (130.5 km/h) before the anemometer instrument was blown off the tower. To the northeast of Experiment, the tornado produced high-end EF1 damage as it moved through the northeastern fringes of Griffin, downing many trees and inflicting moderate to severe damage to homes and other structures near East McIntosh Road. Damage then became less severe and more sporadic as the tornado exited the Griffin area, and the damage path narrowed as it crossed North McDonough Road and Amelia Road. The tornado continued at EF1 intensity as it moved into Henry County. Crossing I-75, the tornado strengthened back to high-end EF1 intensity as it struck two neighborhoods on the south side of Locust Grove. Numerous homes were damaged by tornadic winds or falling trees in this area. The tornado crossed over US 23 and entered neighborhoods in the eastern part of Locust Grove, where more trees were downed, and additional homes were damaged. The tornado exited Locust Grove and continued to the northeast, causing more EF1 damage along Peeksville Road before weakening to EF0 strength as it crossed Wolf Creek Road. The damage path of the tornado became less defined and dissipated near Collins Way at 4:45 p.m. EST (21:45 UTC). Damage assessments indicated that approximately 1,465 homes were affected in the city of Griffin, and 754 were affected in other areas of Spalding County, with at least 250+ that were destroyed or sustained significant damage. The tornado was on the ground for a total of 32.8 miles (52.8 km) and injured 18 people.

=== East Griffin–Jenkinsburg–Jackson Lake, Georgia ===
East Griffin–Jenkinsburg–Jackson Lake, Georgia
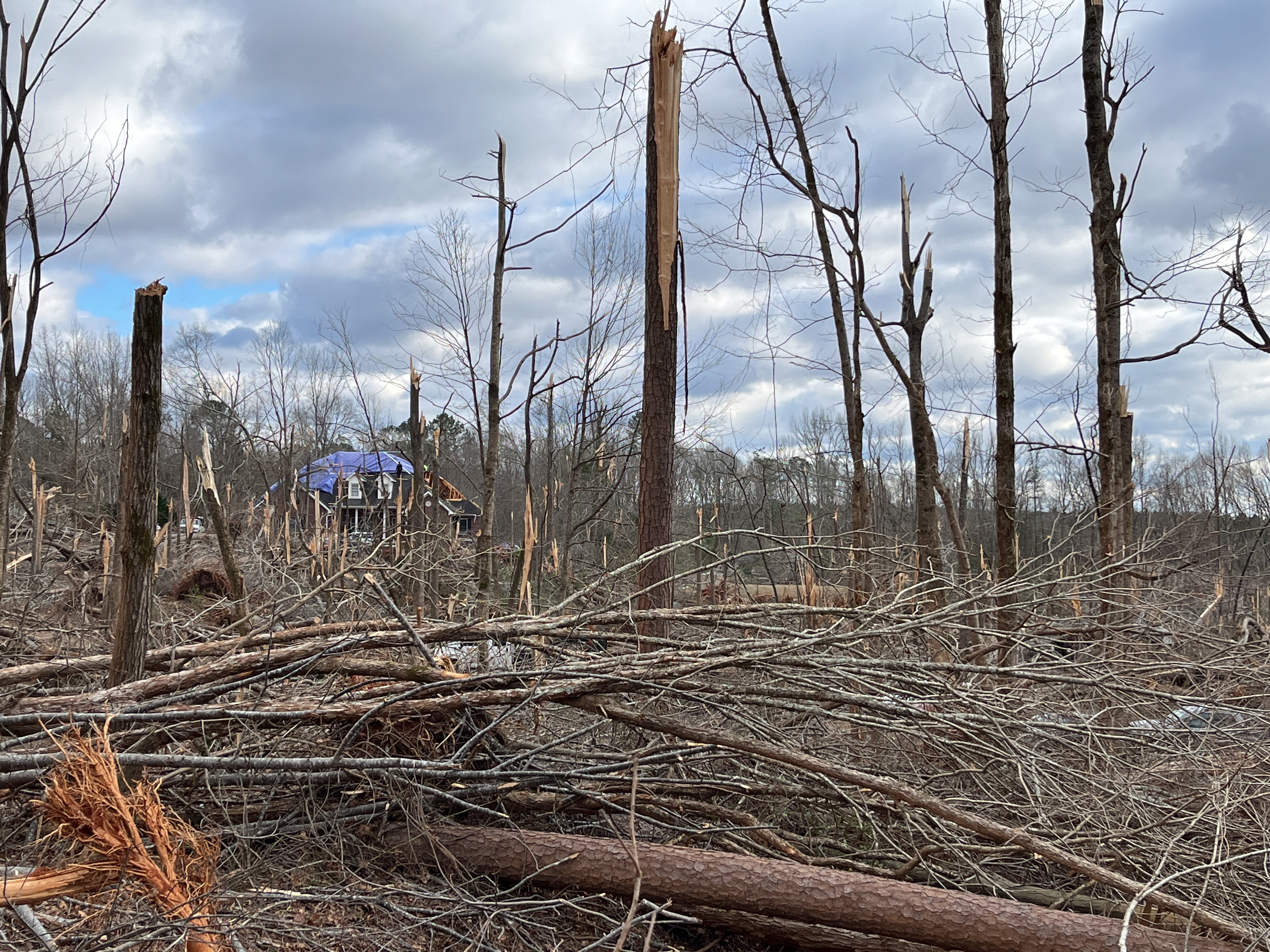
- Extensive tree damage in East Griffin from the tornado.

Meteorological history
- Formed: January 12, 2023, 4:27 p.m. EST (UTC−05:00)
- Dissipated: January 12, 2023, 5:01 p.m. EST (UTC−05:00)
- Duration: 34 minutes

EF2 tornado
- on the Enhanced Fujita scale
- Highest winds: 130 mph (210 km/h)

Overall effects
- Casualties: 1 fatality (+1 indirect), 10 injuries

This large and strong tornado was spawned by a secondary circulation within the same parent supercell that produced the EF3 Griffin tornado to its north, paralleling the path of the stronger tornado. It first touched down just southeast of East Griffin in Spalding County at 4:27 pm EST (21:27 UTC) and moved northeastward. It immediately reached EF1 strength and first snapped or uprooted multiple trees along Crouch Road and Wild Plum Road before striking a Rinnai Corporation building, damaging the roof and exterior walls, and blowing out several windows. The tornado then quickly intensified to high-end EF2 intensity as it crossed SR 16, and a well-built home in this area had severe roof and structural damage, while many large trees were snapped or uprooted as well. As the tornado continued northeastward, it weakened back to EF1 intensity, downing numerous trees as it approached I-75. As it crossed I-75, the tornado became the dominant circulation within the parent supercell as the EF3 Griffin tornado to the north began to occlude and weaken. As a result, this tornado's wind field grew in size as it moved into Butts County, producing high-end EF1 to low-end EF2 damage near Dean Patrick Road and England Chapel Road, as numerous trees were snapped or uprooted in this area. Maintaining its strength, the tornado continued to the northeast and inflicted considerable damage to several homes along Shiloah Road, Plaza Drive, and Smith Drive. The tornado then impacted Jenkinsburg, where trees were downed, and a large warehouse building was significantly damaged along US 23. The roof and exterior walls of the structure were severely damaged, with debris strewn across the roadway. Adjacent to the highway on the Norfolk Southern Railway line, three rail cars on a train were derailed. Some outbuilding structures were also damaged or destroyed, and damage in the Jenkinsburg area was rated high-end EF1 to low-end EF2. The tornado then weakened to EF1 strength as it continued to the northeast of town. The EF3 Griffin tornado to its north then dissipated at 4:45 p.m. EST (21:45 UTC), but another tornado, rated EF1, quickly formed from the remnant circulation four minutes later and paralleled this tornado for nearly 10 miles (16 km) to the Jackson Lake area. The damage paths of the two tornadoes were right next to each other at times and covered a combined width of 2.5 miles (4.0 km).

As this tornado passed south of Worthville, it quickly intensified back to EF2 strength, causing widespread significant damage to trees and homes in several neighborhoods along SR 36 west of Jackson Lake. One tree fell on a car on Haley Road, killing the passenger and critically injuring the driver. Maintaining EF2 intensity, the tornado then moved through the southern part Newton County and caused additional major damage to houses in several neighborhoods along the shore of Jackson Lake, both west of and along SR 212. The EF1 tornado to the north of this tornado then dissipated after the latter had entered Jasper County at 4:57 p.m. EST (21:57 UTC). It then caused intermittent EF1 to low-end EF2 damage after crossing the county line. The Bear Creek Marina and several campers were destroyed along this segment of the path. The tornado then became weak, damaging more trees at EF0 intensity as it approached and crossed SR 11, before dissipating near Margery Lake at 5:01 pm EST (22:01 UTC).

The tornado was on the ground for 31.98 miles (51.47 km). In addition to the fatality, ten other people were injured. An indirect fatality was attributed to this tornado the following day when a state transportation worker was knocked out of a bucket truck by a falling tree limb while trying to restore powerlines after the storm in Jasper County.

== Impacts ==
Alabama Governor Kay Ivey declared a state of emergency in Autauga, Chambers, Coosa, Dallas, Elmore and Tallapoosa counties, as did Georgia Governor Brian Kemp for the whole state. These declarations were followed on January 15 by a major disaster declaration in Alabama by President Biden, making federal funds available to victims of the storms (as well as affected local governments, organizations, and businesses) in Autauga and Dallas counties.

=== Casualties ===
At least nine fatalities resulted, eight of which were direct. Seven occurred in mobile homes in Old Kingston, Alabama from an EF3 tornado; the other occurred in Butts County, Georgia when an EF2 tornado knocked a tree down on a car, killing a five-year old passenger and critically injuring the parent driving. This tornado was also responsible for an indirect fatality the following day when a lineman was knocked out of a bucket truck after being struck by a large tree branch while attempting to restore powerlines in Jasper County. Multiple injuries also occurred. An Alabama state trooper was hospitalized when his patrol vehicle was struck by a falling tree.

=== Closures ===
In anticipation of severe weather, multiple school districts closed early in Alabama and Georgia. The University of Georgia's Griffin campus closed because of damage to buildings and trees on campus from an EF3 tornado.

=== Power outages ===
Approximately 37,000 people in Alabama and more than 78,000 in Georgia were without power by the evening of January 12, figures which included but were not limited to severe weather outages.

== See also ==
- List of United States tornadoes from January to February 2023
- List of North American tornadoes and tornado outbreaks
- Weather of 2023
