= 2023 Selma tornado =

2023 tornado in Alabama, U.S.

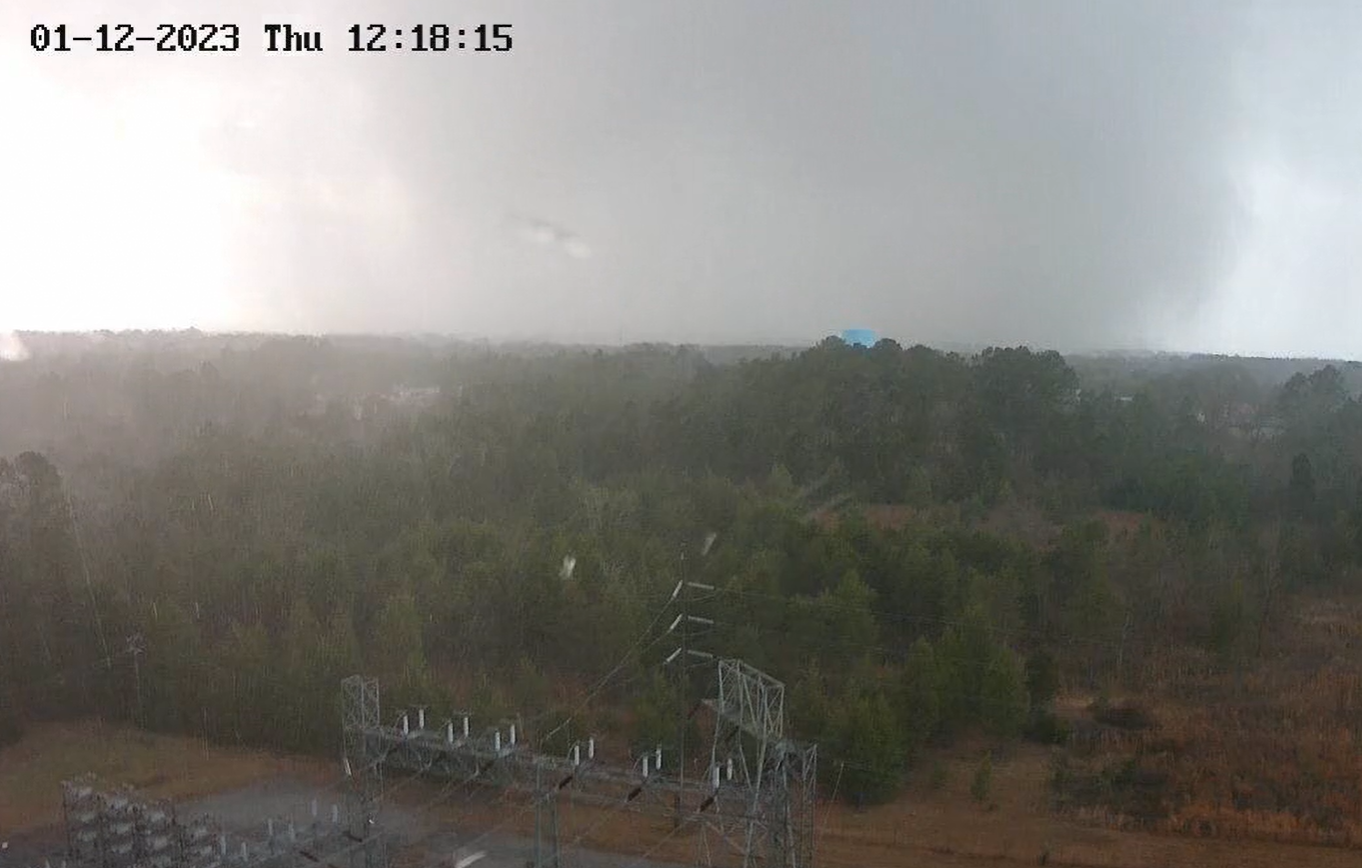
- The tornado at EF2 intensity in downtown Selma, seen from an Alabama Power sky camera

Meteorological history
- Formed: January 12, 2023, 12:04 p.m. CST (UTC−06:00)
- Dissipated: January 12, 2023, 12:31 p.m. CST (UTC−06:00)
- Duration: 27 minutes

EF2 tornado
- on the Enhanced Fujita scale
- Highest winds: 130 mph (210 km/h)

Overall effects
- Fatalities: 0
- Injuries: 2
- Damage: >$9 million (2023 USD)
- Part of the Tornado outbreak of January 12, 2023 and Tornadoes of 2023

In the midday hours of January 12, 2023, a significant EF2-rated tornado moved through portions of Selma, located in the US state of Alabama. The tornado was part of a larger tornado outbreak the same day. The tornado injured two people in the Selma area and left 19,000 residents without power in the immediate aftermath of the tornado. In all, the tornado caused an estimated total of damages that totaled in excess of $9 million (2023 USD).

The tornado first touched down at 12:04 p.m. (Note: For consistency, all times in the article are displayed in Central Daylight Time (CDT) unless stated otherwise.) near Orrville, tracking to the east at low intensity. It grew as it neared Selma, crossing the Cahaba River and reaching EF2 intensity as it entered into the city limits of Selma. The tornado inflicted heavy damage to southern portions of the town, damaging or destroying an estimated one-third of Selma and injuring two people. In Selma, the tornado destroyed multiple churches and struck a daycare sheltering seventy children; one child sustained minor injuries and the others were unharmed. The tornado dissipated 27 minutes after touching down, retaining wind speeds estimated to have been as high as 130 miles per hour (210 km/h).

== Meteorological synopsis ==
On January 11, the Storm Prediction Center outlined a level 1/Marginal risk across the mid-South valid for the overnight and early morning hours. Although the environment was initially capped, conditions were expected to become more conducive for severe weather given the approach of a mid-level trough and a gradually moistening airmass. A more substantive threat for organized severe weather evolved on January 12 and the SPC outlined a level 3/Enhanced risk for 30% risk of damaging winds centered along central and eastern Alabama and northwestern portions of Georgia in their 0600 UTC outlook update. Here, numerical weather prediction models indicated the presence of 6.5 C/km mid-level lapse rates and 500-1000 J/kg convective available potential energy (CAPE) values supportive of transient supercells and bowing segments. However, it also depicted only modest low-level moisture. As such, a large 5% risk for at least a conditional threat of brief tornadoes was introduced for most of the lower Tennessee Valley, including portions of Mississippi, Alabama, Georgia, southern Tennessee, and northwestern South Carolina.

As the day advanced, a more focused corridor for enhanced tornado potential became evident across central Alabama and northwestern Georgia, where effective storm-relative helicity – a measure of the potential for updrafts in supercells – topped 300 m^{2}/s^{2} and CAPE values rose into the 1,000–1,500 J/kg range. The SPC upped the threat for tornadoes to 10% in their 1300 UTC outlook as a result, although the possibility for strong tornadoes, above EF2 intensity, was not included in this outlook as damaging winds were still seen as the primary hazard.

== Tornado summary ==
=== Formation and path through Selma ===
The tornado first touched just northeast of Orrville near the intersection of SR 22 and County Road 999 at 12:04 p.m. CST (18:04 UTC). As it moved northeastward along SR 22, the tornado damaged several mobile homes and pushed them off their foundations. A frame home sustained minor damage in this area. Damage along this initial path segment was rated EF1. The tornado retained EF1 intensity as it moved across SR 22 north of Beloit. A church had its steeple and part of its roof blown off and homes sustained roof damage. After causing additional tree damage along SR 22, the tornado rapidly intensified just before it crossed the Cahaba River and began approaching the southwestern city limits of Selma. Many large hardwood and softwood trees were snapped at EF2 intensity in this area. The now strong tornado then crossed SR 219 as it entered the southwest side of Selma, causing significant damage along Old Orville Road. Multiple houses were heavily damaged and had their roofs torn off along this corridor, and a few lost some of their exterior walls.

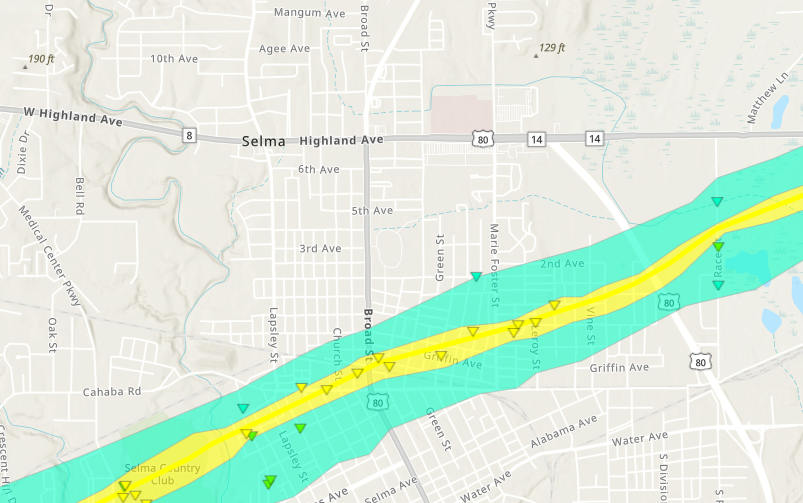
Track and intensity map of the tornado through downtown Selma. (Note: The triangles indicate the degree of damage at a specific location.) Key EF0 65–85 mph EF1 86–110 mph EF2 111–135 mph

Reaching high-end EF2 strength, the tornado struck the Crosspoint Christian Daycare along Cooper Drive, which sustained collapse of its roof and several brick exterior walls. At the time, 70 children were inside the daycare along with staff workers. One baby suffered a minor cut from the tornado, with no other injuries occurring at that location. The nearby Crosspoint Christian Church had a substantial amount of metal roofing torn off and scattered. EF2 damage continued beyond this point as the tornado moved northeastward along West Dallas Avenue, inflicting significant structural damage to homes. An ophthalmologist's office near Office Park Circle was severely damaged and had much of its roof torn off.

Further to the northeast, high-end EF2 damage occurred at the Selma Country Club, where the clubhouse building suffered major damage to its roof and exterior walls, and a few other buildings on the property also had extensive damage. Maintaining high-end EF2 intensity, the tornado then struck the northern part of downtown Selma. Damage here mainly consisted of numerous of trees being snapped or uprooted, some of which fell on homes, and many homes and other buildings that had their roofs and some exterior walls removed. A couple of older residences that were built on brick-piling foundations collapsed, cars were overturned, signs were destroyed, and numerous power poles were snapped.

The historic Reformed Presbyterian Church was badly damaged, and its adjacent church school was almost completely destroyed. As the tornado crossed over Broad St (US 80/SR 22), a strip mall had much of its roof torn off and a nearby metal warehouse building sustained major damage, with metal framing being twisted and failure of X-braces observed. Apartment buildings were badly damaged and debris from structures was strewn across streets, or left tangled in power lines or wrapped around trees. Past the downtown area, the tornado weakened slightly to mid-range EF2 strength as it crossed Marie Foster Street and moved through neighborhoods in the northeastern part of Selma, where many homes and apartment buildings had roofs and exterior walls torn off, and many power lines were downed. Crossing SR 41, the tornado moved out of Selma and maintained EF2 intensity as it moved to the northeast.

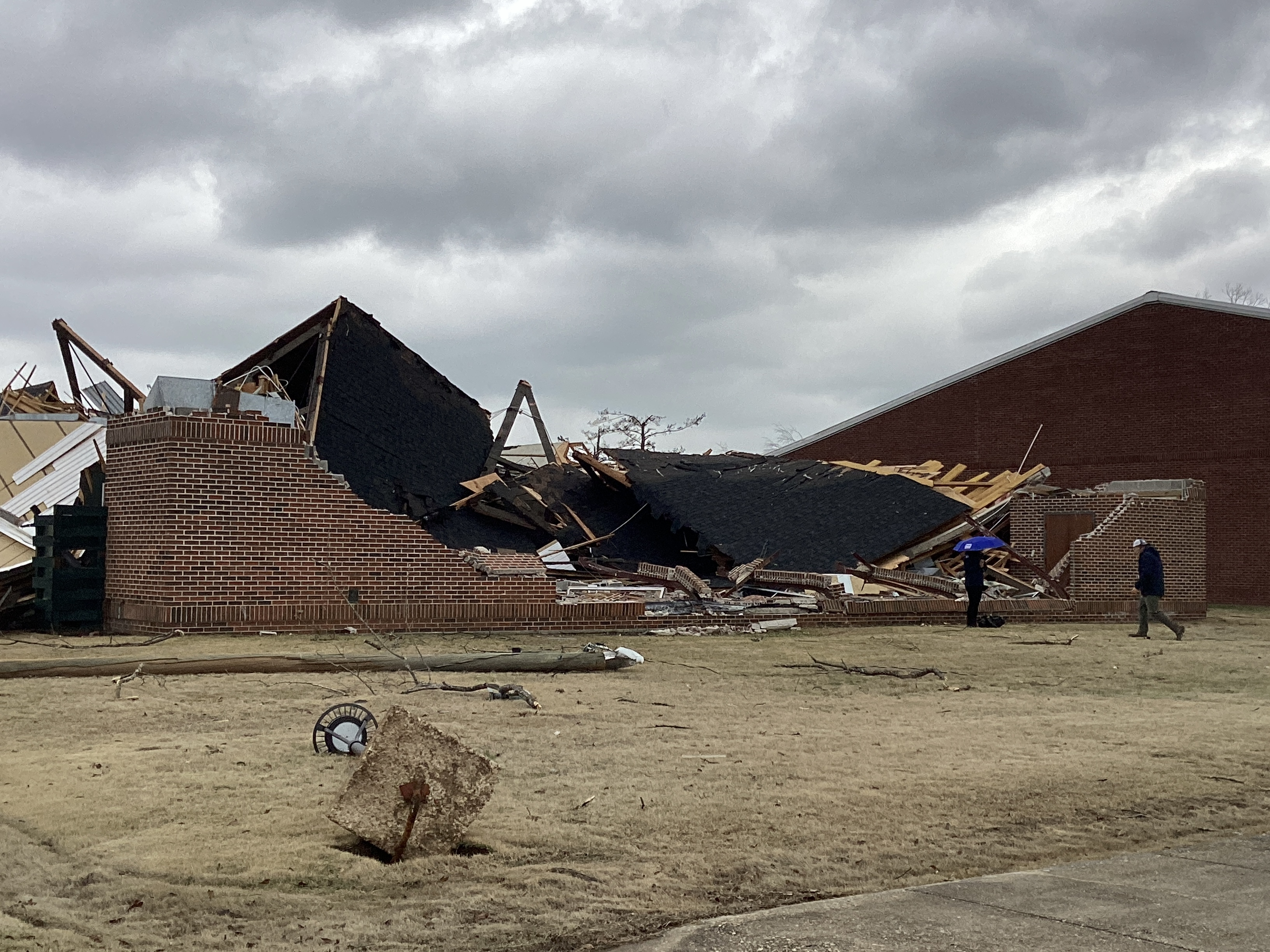
The Crosspoint Christian Daycare, where seventy children sheltered from the tornado. An adjacent church was destroyed.

=== Impact at the Dallas County Jail and dissipation ===
As the tornado crossed SR 14, an outbuilding was completely destroyed and a metal free-standing pole was bent to the ground, with damage in this area being rated EF2. After undergoing some re-intensification, the tornado then impacted a small residential area along Parkway Drive, where a few houses had roofs torn off with some collapse of exterior walls noted. Another outbuilding in this area was completely destroyed; damage was rated high-end EF2. Just past this area, the tornado weakened to EF1 strength as it impacted a FEMA trailer storage facility along Selfield Road, where multiple unanchored trailers were damaged, flipped, or destroyed. A final area of EF2 damage occurred nearby, where the Dallas County Jail suffered extensive damage to its roof and fencing.

Weakening back to EF1 intensity, the tornado then crossed SR 14 again, damaging some outbuildings. The tornado weakened further as it passed south of Manila, causing minor EF0 tree damage along this segment of the path. It inflicted EF0 damage to a house and dissipated as it crossed SR 140 to the southeast of Burnsville at 12:31 p.m. CST (18:31 UTC), just before reaching the Autauga County line. The tornado was on the ground for 23.22 miles (37.37 km), resulting in two injuries.

== Aftermath ==
The tornado inflicted heavy damage to Selma and surrounding areas. A mandatory curfew was enacted in Selma after the tornado.

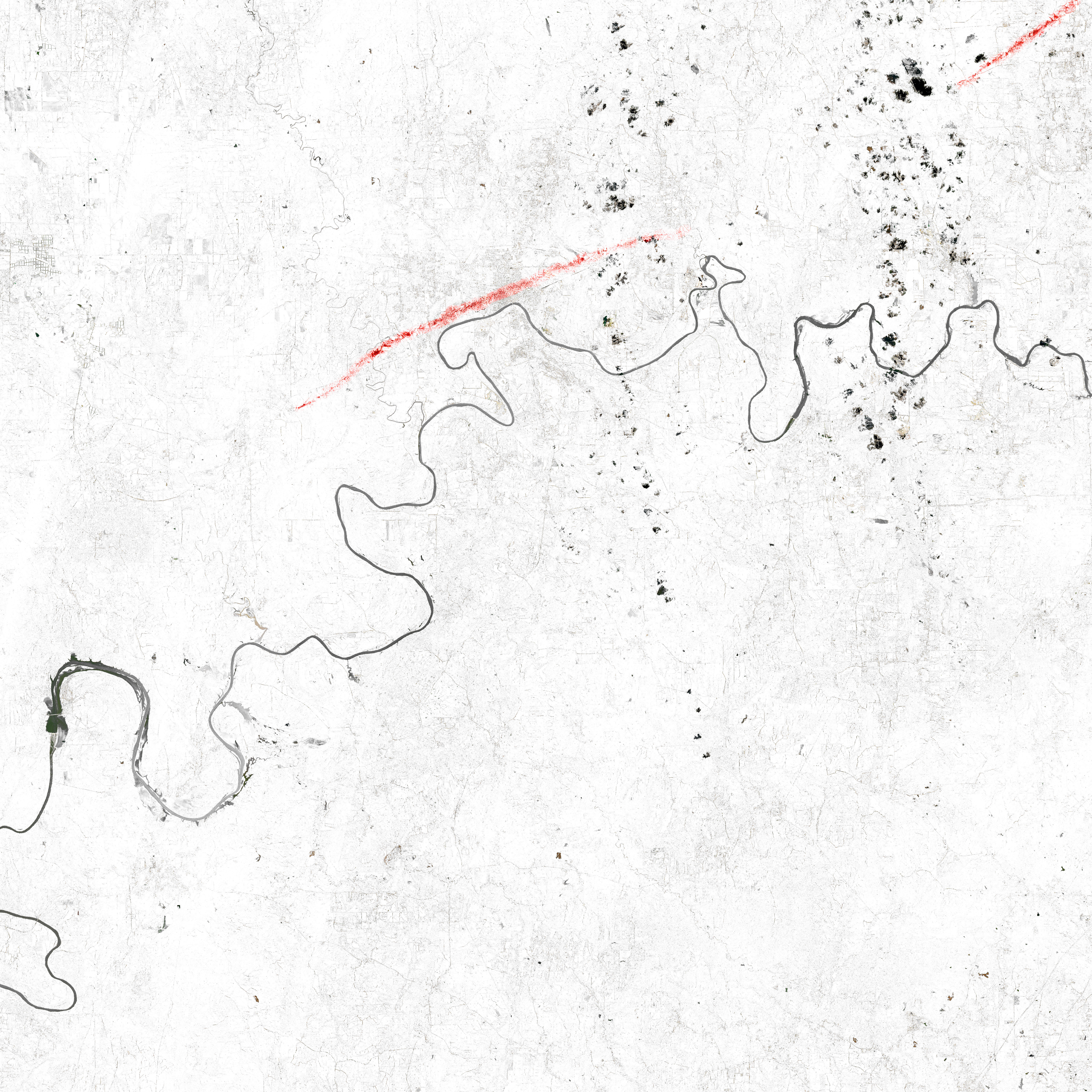
Selma and surrounding areas immediately following the tornado, seen by Landsat 8 on January 14. The scar of the tornado is visible, extending to the west of Selma.

=== Damage ===
Around one-third of Selma sustained heavy damage from the tornado, which was determined by the National Weather Service to have produced EF2-rated damage following a tornado damage survey. The city council of Selma declared a state of emergency following the tornado, which left an estimated 19,000 people without power in the general vicinity of the city. 32 public housing units were destroyed by the tornado, and emergency management agencies determined that the tornado damaged or destroyed a total of 3,200 structures. Roads in Selma were shut down due to concerns over downed power lines and trees falling on roads. James Perkins Jr., who was the mayor of Selma at the time of the tornado, stated that power in the city was "shot". Shortly after the tornado, at least one damaged building in Selma caught on fire.

=== Recovery efforts ===
Recovery efforts were intensive, and continued for over a year after the tornado. U.S. Representative Terri Sewell stated during initial recovery efforts after the tornado: "This will be a marathon, not a sprint, but rest assured we will come back stronger than before"; she had also made a major disaster declaration immediately following the event. Then-President Joe Biden authorized federal funds to be directed at recovery efforts in Selma less than a month after the event. A makeshift American Red Cross shelter was also set up inside of the Selma High School to provide residents with food and water. In June 2023, the Black Belt Community Foundation gave $150,000 (2023 USD) to aid with recovery and rebuilding efforts in Selma. By October 2023, the mayor reported that debris was removed from all residential properties within the city limits of Selma.

Through 2023, the City of Selma gave away homes to several people whose property was destroyed by the tornado. Selma, the origin point of the Civil Rights era marches to Montgomery in the 1960s, was "brought together" by the tornado, which hit the town just days before Martin Luther King Jr. day.

== See also ==
- List of North American tornadoes and tornado outbreaks
- Weather of 2023
- Tornadoes in Alabama
