= Georgia Midland and Gulf Railroad =

The Georgia Midland and Gulf Railroad was chartered in 1885 and began operations in 1887, running from Columbus, GA to McDonough, GA. In 1890, the line leased the Columbus Southern Railway but was forced to cancel the lease a year later due to financial issues. The GM&G finally entered bankruptcy in 1895 and was sold to the Georgia Midland Railway which was founded in 1896 to take over the failed Georgia Midland and Gulf Railroad, the Georgia Midland Railway operated about 100 miles of rail from McDonough, GA to Columbus, GA. The railroad didn't even last a full year when it was leased to the Southern Railway, but it remained a subsidiary until it was merged into the Norfolk Southern Railway in 1996. The Norfolk Southern Training Center is located on this line between McDonough and Greenwood.

It ran from McDonough in the north through several communities in Henry County, GA such as Greenwood and Luella into northern Spalding County, GA passing through Experiment, GA and crossing the Central of Georgia Railroad in Griffin, GA. From there it ran south toward Williamson, GA in Pike County, crossing the old A&F line, and on into Concord, GA then on into Meriwether County, GA where it passed through Woodbury, GA. It then continued south toward and through Warm Springs, GA and then further south into Columbus, GA. Portions of this line still exist, mostly from McDonough to Greenwood (Liberty), and from the northern Spalding County line near the old Towaliga Station toward Experiment. This section is currently being refurbished by the Roosevelt Railroad. Then from Griffin south to Georgia State Route 362. Most all the other stretches have been pulled up. The section of the railroad in Columbus has been converted to the Fall Line Trace, a paved, multi-use recreational trail.

The "M" line is the route that Franklin D. Roosevelt took on his trips through Georgia on his trips to Warm Springs, GA when it was under control of the Southern Railway.
