= Worthville =

Worthville is the name of some places in the United States:

- Worthville, Georgia
- Worthville, Kansas
- Worthville, Kentucky
- Worthville, North Carolina
- Worthville, Pennsylvania
