= Roosevelt Railroad =

The Roosevelt Railroad, owned by the Roosevelt Railroad Museum Inc., runs southward for approximately seven miles from Towaliga in the north end of Spalding County, Georgia, to Experiment, Georgia.

The railroad, formerly part of the Southern Railway's "M" line, is being upgraded for scenic rail tours. A museum, located near the site of the old Towilaga station at the north end of the railroad, houses unique and interesting pieces of railroad equipment.

== History and route ==
The Georgia Midland and Gulf Railroad was chartered in 1885 and began operations in 1887, running from Columbus, Georgia, to McDonough, Georgia. In 1890, the line leased the Columbus Southern Railway but was forced to cancel the lease a year later due to financial problems. The GM&G finally entered bankruptcy in 1895 and was sold to the Georgia Midland Railway in 1896.

It ran from McDonough in the north through several communities in Henry County, such as Greenwood and Luella into northern Spalding County, passing through Experiment, and crossing the Central of Georgia Railroad in Griffin, and on south toward Williamson, in Pike County crossing the old Atlanta and Florida Railroad line and on into Concord, then on into Meriwether County, where it passed through Woodbury, and then on south toward and through Warm Springs, and then further south into Columbus.

Portions of this line still exist mostly from McDonough to Greenwood (Liberty), and from the northern Spalding County line near the old Towalaga Station toward Experiment. This section was being refurbished by the Roosevelt Railroad. Then from Griffin south to Georgia State Route 362. Almost all the other stretches have been pulled up. This is the line that Franklin D. Roosevelt took on his trips to Warm Springs, when it was under control of the Southern Railway.
