= Hazelle Goodman =

American actress

- Occupation: Actress
- Years active: 1991–present

Hazelle Goodman (born Hazel Goodman) is an actress from Trinidad and Tobago.

== Early life ==
Goodman was inspired to become an actress after viewing The Sound of Music as a child, before her family moved to New York, where she was raised in the boroughs of Queens and Brooklyn. After she was not accepted to the High School for the Performing Arts, she focused on fashion and obtained a degree from the Fashion Institute of Technology. She worked at an answering service and in retailing before she decided to return to acting by enrolling in the City College of New York.

== Career ==
After graduating from City College of New York with a degree in drama, Goodman spent seven years developing her one-woman show, Hazelle! The show was adapted for the screen by HBO in 1995, and earned two Cable Ace nominations in the Best Comedy Special and Best Performer categories.

In 1997, she became the first black actress to have a prominent role in a Woody Allen film when she portrayed Cookie, a prostitute in Allen's Deconstructing Harry.

Goodman also had a recurring role on Homicide: Life on the Street as Georgia Rae Mahoney, a key figure in a drug dealing family who is eventually murdered.

On stage, in addition to her one-woman show, she has also portrayed the Queen in Shakespeare's Cymbeline and took part in the February 10, 2001 staging of Eve Ensler's The Vagina Monologues at Madison Square Garden. Goodman wrote and starred in a second one-woman show called To the Top, Top, Top! She was also an original cast member of Spalding Gray: Stories Left to Tell, performing the late artist's monologues that primarily dealt with adventure.

== Filmography ==
=== Film ===
Year	Title	Role	Notes
1991	True Identity	Miles' Neighbor #1	
1995	Heat	Hooker's Mother	
1997	White Lies	Coffee Shop Waitress	
1997	Deconstructing Harry	Cookie	
1999	Just One Time	Lesbian Book Group Leader	
2000	Chinese Coffee	Café Dante waitress	
2001	Hannibal	Evelda Drumgo	
2003	Crossing	Mother	Short film
2005	All the Invisible Children	Ms. Wright	Segment: "Jesus Children of America"
2011	Extremely Loud & Incredibly Close	Hazelle Black	
2019	Brooklyn Love Stories	Evelyn	Segment: "Celeste"

=== Television ===
Year	Title	Role	Notes
1995	Happily Ever After: Fairy Tales for Every Child	The Woodcutter's Wife (voice)	"Rapunzel"
1997-98	Homicide: Life on the Street	Georgia Rae Mahoney	Recurring role
2000	Ed	Ramona	"Better Days"
2001	Sounds from a Town I Love		TV short
2001	Third Watch	Rita Golden	"He Said/She Said", "Childhood Memories"
2004	Law & Order	Mrs. Gordon	"Can I Get a Witness?"
