= Jenkinsburg, Georgia =

- City
- Seal

- Location in Butts County and the state of Georgia
- Coordinates: 33°19′30″N 84°2′6″W
- Country: United States
- State: Georgia
- County: Butts

Area
  - Total: 1.31 sq mi (3.38 km^{2})
  - Land: 1.30 sq mi (3.37 km^{2})
  - Water: 0.0039 sq mi (0.01 km^{2})
- Elevation: 764 ft (233 m)

Population (2020)
  - Total: 391
  - Density: 300.4/sq mi (115.97/km^{2})
- Time zone: UTC-5 (Eastern (EST))
  - Summer (DST): UTC-4 (EDT)
- ZIP code: 30234
- Area code: 770
- FIPS code: 13-42156
- GNIS feature ID: 0332094
- Website: www.cityofjenkinsburg.com

Jenkinsburg is a city in Butts County, Georgia, United States. The population was 391 in 2020, up from 370 at the 2010 census.

== History ==
The community was named after the Jenkins family, original owners of the town site.

The Georgia General Assembly incorporated Jenkinsburg as a town in 1889.

The community was heavily damaged by an EF2 tornado on January 12, 2023. The tornado killed two people (one of which was indirect) and injured 10 others (the direct fatality occurred further to the northeast in Jackson Lake area while the indirect fatality occurred in Jasper County).

== Geography ==
Jenkinsburg is located near the northwest border of Butts County at 33°19′30″N 84°2′6″W (33.325081, -84.034922), along U.S. Route 23. It lies 5 miles (8 km) northwest of Jackson, the Butts County seat, and 5 miles (8 km) southeast of Locust Grove and access to Interstate 75.

According to the United States Census Bureau, Jenkinsburg has a total area of 1.2 square miles (3.2 km^{2}), all land.

== Demographics ==
Historical population
Census	Pop.	Note	%±
1900	255		—
1910	237		−7.1%
1920	300		26.6%
1930	257		−14.3%
1940	166		−35.4%
1950	166		0.0%
1960	233		40.4%
1970	382		63.9%
1980	360		−5.8%
1990	213		−40.8%
2000	203		−4.7%
2010	370		82.3%
2020	391		5.7%
U.S. Decennial Census

As of the census of 2000, there were 203 people, 76 households, and 55 families residing in the town. The population density was 258.4 inhabitants per square mile (99.8/km^{2}). There were 84 housing units at an average density of 106.9 per square mile (41.3/km^{2}). The racial makeup of the town was 72.41% White, 21.67% African American, 0.49% Asian, 0.49% Pacific Islander, and 4.93% from two or more races.

There were 76 households, out of which 31.6% had children under the age of 18 living with them, 57.9% were married couples living together, 13.2% had a female householder with no husband present, and 27.6% were non-families. 25.0% of all households were made up of individuals, and 6.6% had someone living alone who was 65 years of age or older. The average household size was 2.62 and the average family size was 3.13.

In the town the population was spread out, with 26.1% under the age of 18, 8.9% from 18 to 24, 29.6% from 25 to 44, 25.6% from 45 to 64, and 9.9% who were 65 years of age or older. The median age was 36 years. For every 100 females, there were 91.5 males. For every 100 females age 18 and over, there were 85.2 males.

The median income for a household in the town was $40,417, and the median income for a family was $45,625. Males had a median income of $31,786 versus $29,000 for females. The per capita income for the town was $17,437. About 4.3% of families and 13.7% of the population were below the poverty line, including 15.9% of those under the age of eighteen and 9.5% of those 65 or over.
