= Fall Line Trace =

Multi-use recreational trail in Georgia, United States

Coordinates: 32°30′27.9″N 84°56′9.8″W

- Length: 11 mi (18 km)
- Trailheads: Chattahoochee RiverWalk, Psalmond Road
- Season: Year round
- Surface: paved
- Right of way: Georgia Midland and Gulf Railroad
- Website: Dragonfly Trails

The Fall Line Trace is an 11-mile-long (18 km) rail trail in Columbus, Georgia, United States. It was opened in 2011 as a converted trail along the right of way once used by the Georgia Midland and Gulf Railroad. The Fall Line Trace is part of the Dragonfly Trails, a larger network of trails in Columbus.

== Route description ==
Mile marker four of the Fall Line Trace looking west. The trail passes here from the campus of Columbus State University over Interstate 185 towards downtown.

The Fall Line Trace begins at the junction of the Chattahoochee RiverWalk and the pedestrian-only Fourteenth Street Bridge across the Chattahoochee River to Phenix City, Alabama in Downtown Columbus, Georgia. From the bridge to Fifth Avenue, the trail travels along a sidewalk along the north side of Fourteenth Street. After crossing Fifth Avenue, the trail follows it north to cross Fifteeth Street and Linwood Boulevard as a sidewalk. It continues between the north side of Linwood Boulevard and the Old City Cemetery until it reaches the right of way of the former Georgia Midland and Gulf Railroad just west of Tenth Avenue. The trail briefly follows the former railroad until it reaches Piedmont Columbus Regional Midtown Hospital. The hospital's parking lot occupies the railroad's former path, so the trail once again follows sidewalks to cross Eighteenth Street and Tenth Avenue. After following Tenth Avenue along the hospital campus, the trail once again picks up the routing of the railroad. The rest of the trail follows the former railroad through more residential parts of Columbus to Psalmond Road in Midland with only a brief departure from the old right of way near Columbus State University where the trail crosses Gentian Boulevard and University Avenue.

From its beginning in downtown to its end at Psalmond Road, the trail has a total length of 11 miles (18 km). The trail nearly spans the width of Columbus from its western edge at the Chattahoochee River to a point less than 2 miles (3.2 km) from its northern limits. It also provides pedestrian access to Cooper Creek Park and Flat Rock Park.

== History ==
The Fall Line Trace was built in the right of way of the Georgia Midland and Gulf Railroad, a railway that once linked Columbus to McDonough beginning in 1887. The Georgia Midland and Gulf was acquired by Southern Railway in 1896. The city of Columbus purchased the right of way from Norfolk Southern Railway, the successor of Southern Railway, and completed the conversion of the trail from the Chattahoochee RiverWalk to its end in northeastern Columbus in 2011. The conversion of the trail from a railroad involved the replacement of three bridges that were unable to be retrofitted. In 2015, the Fall Line Trace became a part of the Dragonfly Trails, a system of multi-use trails that is designed to connect various pre-existing trails like the Fall Line Trace and Chattahoochee RiverWalk and expand the Columbus's trail network.
