= Leon Berry =

American organist (1914-1996)

- Born: Leon Clay Berry; July 2, 1914; Burnsville, Alabama, U.S.
- Died: August 23, 1996 (aged 82); Park Ridge, Illinois, U.S.
- Resting place: Memorial Park Cemetery; Skokie, Illinois, U.S.
- Education: American Conservatory of Music
- Occupation: Organist
- Children: Linda DeBruler

Leon Clay Berry (July 2, 1914 - August 23, 1996) was an American organist. He was known in the Chicago area as the "dean of roller rink rock". A graduate of the American Conservatory of Music in Chicago, his 1953 recording of "Misirlou" on Dot Records reached sixth on the Billboard Magazine popularity charts. Berry also recorded for Audio Fidelity Records.
