= Worthville, Georgia =

Unincorporated community in Georgia, U.S.

Coordinates: 33°23′23″N 83°55′17″W

Worthville is an unincorporated community in Butts County, in the U.S. state of Georgia.

== History ==
An early variant name was "Lofton's Store". A post office called Worthville was established in 1850, and remained in operation until 1901.
