= Burnsville, Alabama =

Unincorporated community in Alabama, United States

- Unincorporated community
- Location in Alabama Burnsville (the United States)
- Coordinates: 32°28′28″N 86°53′30″W
- Country: United States
- State: Alabama
- County: Dallas
- Elevation: 187 ft (57 m)
- Time zone: UTC-6 (Central (CST))
  - Summer (DST): UTC-5 (CDT)
- Area code: 334
- GNIS feature ID: 151706

Burnsville, also known as Byrnville, is an unincorporated community in Dallas County, Alabama.

== History ==
Burnsville was named for James H. Burns, who settled in the area in 1838. A post office operated under the name Burnsville from 1841 to 1956.

The Everdale Baptist Church in Burnsville is listed on the Alabama Register of Landmarks and Heritage.

== Notable person ==
- Leon Berry (1914–1996), American organist
