= Manila, Alabama =

Unincorporated community in Alabama, United States

- Unincorporated community
- Location within Alabama Location within the United States
- Coordinates: 32°26′54″N 86°55′16″W
- Country: United States
- State: Alabama
- County: Dallas
- Elevation: 171 ft (52 m)
- Time zone: UTC-6 (Central (CST))
  - Summer (DST): UTC-5 (CDT)
- Area code: 334
- GNIS feature ID: 152216

Manila (also Veto) is an unincorporated community in Dallas County, Alabama, United States.
