= Experiment, Georgia =

- Unincorporated community Census-designated place
- Location in Spalding County and the state of Georgia
- Coordinates: 33°16′28″N 84°16′29″W
- Country: United States
- State: Georgia
- County: Spalding

Area
  - Total: 2.98 sq mi (7.72 km^{2})
  - Land: 2.97 sq mi (7.70 km^{2})
  - Water: 0.0077 sq mi (0.02 km^{2})
- Elevation: 945 ft (288 m)

Population (2020)
  - Total: 3,328
  - Density: 1,119.3/sq mi (432.17/km^{2})
- Time zone: UTC-5 (Eastern (EST))
  - Summer (DST): UTC-4 (EDT)
- ZIP code: 30212
- Area code: 770
- FIPS code: 13-28296
- GNIS feature ID: 0331680

Experiment is an unincorporated community and census-designated place (CDP) in Spalding County, Georgia, United States. The population was 3,328 in 2020.

== History ==
Experiment is named for the University of Georgia Agricultural Experiment Station located there. Experiment has been noted for its unusual place name.

The community was heavily damaged by an EF3 tornado on January 12, 2023. The tornado injured 18 people along its path.

== Geography ==
Experiment is located at 33°16′28″N 84°16′29″W (33.274505, -84.274758), immediately north of Griffin and approximately 30 miles (48.3 km) south-southeast of Atlanta.

According to the United States Census Bureau, the CDP has a total area of 3.0 square miles (7.8 km^{2}), all land.

=== Climate ===
Climate data for Experiment, Georgia, 1991–2020 normals, extremes 1900–2004
Month	Jan	Feb	Mar	Apr	May	Jun	Jul	Aug	Sep	Oct	Nov	Dec	Year
Record high °F (°C)	79 (26)	89 (32)	88 (31)	93 (34)	97 (36)	103 (39)	104 (40)	101 (38)	103 (39)	96 (36)	86 (30)	79 (26)	104 (40)
Mean daily maximum °F (°C)	55.6 (13.1)	59.0 (15.0)	66.8 (19.3)	74.1 (23.4)	81.2 (27.3)	87.3 (30.7)	89.8 (32.1)	88.5 (31.4)	83.9 (28.8)	75.0 (23.9)	65.8 (18.8)	58.0 (14.4)	73.7 (23.2)
Daily mean °F (°C)	45.0 (7.2)	47.7 (8.7)	55.5 (13.1)	62.1 (16.7)	70.2 (21.2)	76.6 (24.8)	79.4 (26.3)	78.2 (25.7)	73.7 (23.2)	63.6 (17.6)	54.0 (12.2)	47.2 (8.4)	62.8 (17.1)
Mean daily minimum °F (°C)	34.3 (1.3)	36.5 (2.5)	44.3 (6.8)	50.1 (10.1)	59.1 (15.1)	66.0 (18.9)	69.0 (20.6)	68.0 (20.0)	63.5 (17.5)	52.2 (11.2)	42.1 (5.6)	36.4 (2.4)	51.8 (11.0)
Record low °F (°C)	−8 (−22)	5 (−15)	11 (−12)	25 (−4)	35 (2)	44 (7)	51 (11)	51 (11)	35 (2)	26 (−3)	5 (−15)	0 (−18)	−8 (−22)
Average precipitation inches (mm)	5.27 (134)	4.32 (110)	5.08 (129)	4.04 (103)	3.71 (94)	4.91 (125)	5.07 (129)	5.08 (129)	4.39 (112)	3.31 (84)	4.01 (102)	5.00 (127)	54.19 (1,378)
Average snowfall inches (cm)	1.1 (2.8)	0.0 (0.0)	0.1 (0.25)	0.0 (0.0)	0.0 (0.0)	0.0 (0.0)	0.0 (0.0)	0.0 (0.0)	0.0 (0.0)	0.0 (0.0)	0.0 (0.0)	0.0 (0.0)	1.2 (3.05)
Average precipitation days (≥ 0.01 in)	11.7	10.2	10.4	9.2	9.0	12.7	11.8	10.2	7.7	7.5	9.2	11.1	120.7
Average snowy days (≥ 0.1 in)	0.2	0.0	0.1	0.0	0.0	0.0	0.0	0.0	0.0	0.0	0.0	0.0	0.3
Source 1: NOAA (snow/snow days 1981–2010)
Source 2: National Weather Service

== Demographics ==
Historical population
Census	Pop.	Note	%±
1950	4,265		—
1960	2,497		−41.5%
1970	2,256		−9.7%
1980	3,731		65.4%
1990	3,762		0.8%
2000	3,233		−14.1%
2010	2,894		−10.5%
2020	3,328		15.0%
U.S. Decennial Census; 1850-1870 1870-1880; 1890-1910 1920-1930; 1940 1950 1960; 1970 1980 1990; 2000 2010 2020

Experiment was first listed as an unincorporated place in the 1950 U.S. census and then designated a census designated place in 1980 U.S. census.

=== Racial and ethnic composition ===
Experiment CDP, Georgia – Racial and ethnic composition Note: the US Census treats Hispanic/Latino as an ethnic category. This table excludes Latinos from the racial categories and assigns them to a separate category. Hispanics/Latinos may be of any race.
Race / Ethnicity (NH = Non-Hispanic)	Pop 2000	Pop. 2010	Pop 2020	% 2000	% 2010	% 2020
White alone (NH)	1,455	1,220	967	45.00%	42.16%	29.06%
Black or African American alone (NH)	1,694	1,504	2,024	52.40%	51.97%	60.82%
Native American or Alaska Native alone (NH)	5	10	4	0.15%	0.35%	0.12%
Asian alone (NH)	1	4	11	0.03%	0.14%	0.33%
Native Hawaiian or Pacific Islander alone (NH)	0	5	0	0.00%	0.17%	0.00%
Other race alone (NH)	4	4	7	0.12%	0.14%	0.21%
Mixed race or Multiracial (NH)	34	35	113	1.05%	1.21%	3.40%
Hispanic or Latino (any race)	40	112	202	1.24%	3.87%	6.07%
Total	3,233	2,894	3,328	100.00%	100.00%	100.00%

=== 2020 census ===
As of the 2020 census, Experiment had a population of 3,328. The median age was 33.4 years. 29.4% of residents were under the age of 18 and 14.5% of residents were 65 years of age or older. For every 100 females there were 83.1 males, and for every 100 females age 18 and over there were 73.4 males age 18 and over.

96.8% of residents lived in urban areas, while 3.2% lived in rural areas.

There were 1,217 households in Experiment, of which 41.6% had children under the age of 18 living in them. Of all households, 26.1% were married-couple households, 15.8% were households with a male householder and no spouse or partner present, and 50.2% were households with a female householder and no spouse or partner present. About 23.8% of all households were made up of individuals and 8.4% had someone living alone who was 65 years of age or older.

There were 1,366 housing units, of which 10.9% were vacant. The homeowner vacancy rate was 1.8% and the rental vacancy rate was 5.2%.
