= Beloit, Alabama =

Unincorporated community in Alabama, United States

- Location within Alabama Location within the United States
- Coordinates: 32°12′41″N 87°05′08″W
- Country: United States
- State: Alabama
- County: Dallas
- Elevation: 197 ft (60 m)
- Time zone: UTC-6 (Central (CST))
  - Summer (DST): UTC-5 (CDT)
- ZIP code: 36759
- Area code: 334
- GNIS feature ID: 154980

Beloit is an unincorporated community in Dallas County, Alabama.
