= Five Points, Alabama =

- Town
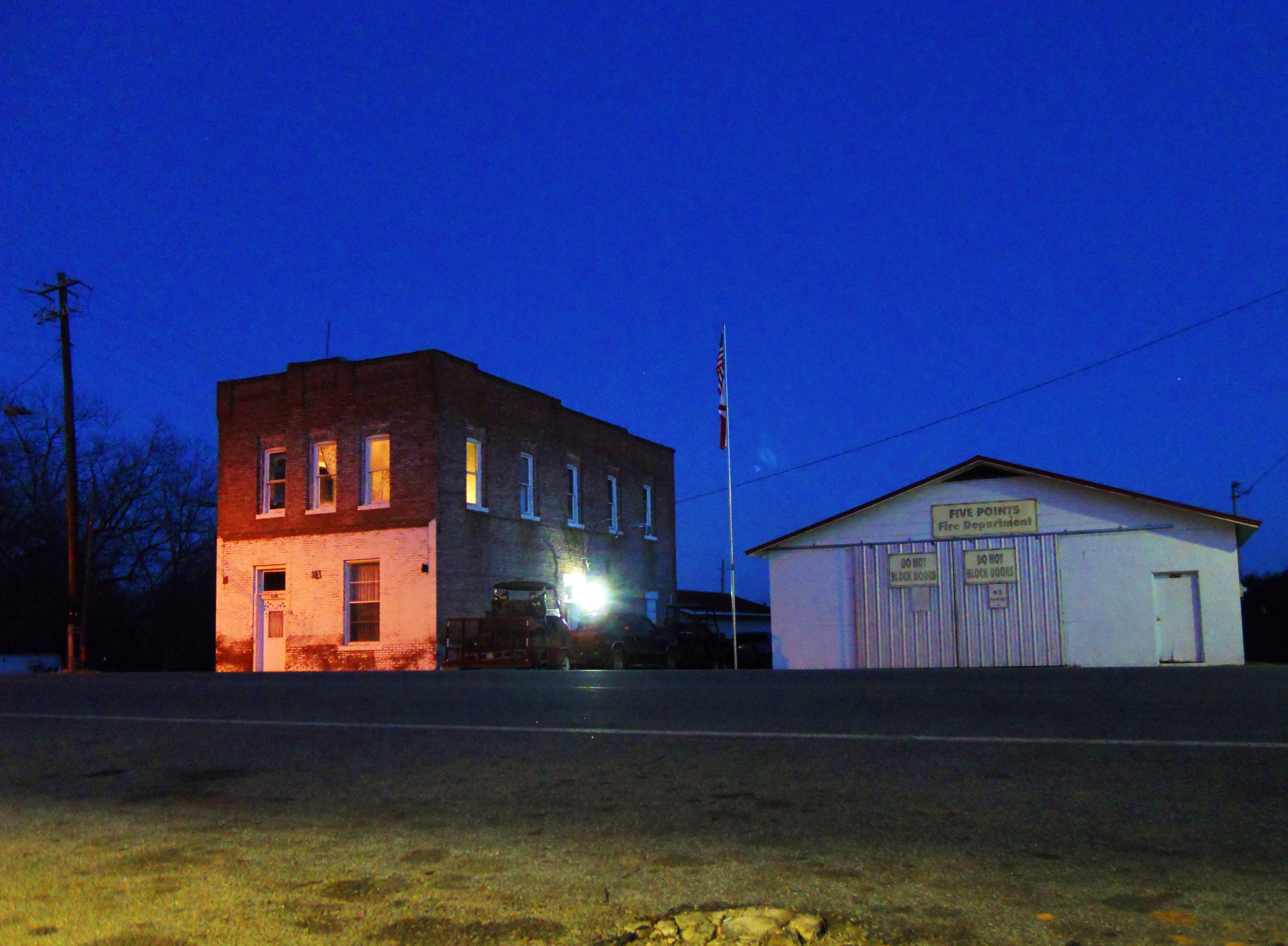
- Five Points at dusk

- Location of Five Points in Chambers County, Alabama.
- Coordinates: 33°01′02″N 85°21′06″W
- Country: United States
- State: Alabama
- County: Chambers

Area
  - Total: 1.03 sq mi (2.67 km^{2})
  - Land: 1.03 sq mi (2.67 km^{2})
  - Water: 0 sq mi (0.00 km^{2})
- Elevation: 876 ft (267 m)

Population (2020)
  - Total: 114
  - Density: 110.7/sq mi (42.74/km^{2})
- Time zone: UTC-6 (Central (CST))
  - Summer (DST): UTC-5 (CDT)
- ZIP code: 36855
- Area code: 334
- FIPS code: 01-26200
- GNIS feature ID: 2406498

Five Points is a town in Chambers County, Alabama, United States. At the 2020 census, the population was 114.

== History ==
In 1885, Five Points was named because of the five roads converging at a single point. Before this, the post office was known as "Lystra". The town was incorporated in 1916, according to documents filed with the Probate Judge, making it Chambers County's oldest incorporated town. The Baptist Church was the first to take the name of "Five Points" on its building in 1929.

Five Points holds the distinction of being the first town of its size to receive electricity from Alabama Power in 1925. In order to receive power, citizens were required to erect their own poles from Stroud to White Plains.

Five Points is home to the first consolidated high school in Alabama. The original Five Points High School was an imposing brick building which had two floors above a full basement and a large auditorium that seated 400 people. Erected in 1916 on an 18-acre (7.3 ha) campus, it was the only rural school in the state with its own electric and steam-generating plant and water works. The school building was replaced by a one-story building in 1939. In 1974 a fire destroyed that structure which was replaced by the present building.

The town elected its first African-American mayor, Geneva Bledsoe, in 1992. The current mayor is Melinda Johnson-Turner, who was appointed mayor in 2025. She is also the towns second African-American female mayor.

== Geography ==
Five Points is located in northern Chambers County. According to the U.S. Census Bureau, the town has a total area of 1.0 square mile (2.7 km^{2}) all land.

== Demographics ==
Historical population
| Census | Pop. | Note | %± |
|---|---|---|---|
| 1920 | 835 | | — |
| 1930 | 1,010 | | 21.0% |
| 1940 | 778 | | −23.0% |
| 1950 | 253 | | −67.5% |
| 1960 | 285 | | 12.6% |
| 1970 | 247 | | −13.3% |
| 1980 | 197 | | −20.2% |
| 1990 | 200 | | 1.5% |
| 2000 | 146 | | −27.0% |
| 2010 | 141 | | −3.4% |
| 2020 | 114 | | −19.1% |
U.S. Decennial Census; 2013 Estimate

=== 2020 census ===
Five Points town, Alabama – Racial and ethnic composition Note: the US Census treats Hispanic/Latino as an ethnic category. This table excludes Latinos from the racial categories and assigns them to a separate category. Hispanics/Latinos may be of any race.
| Race / Ethnicity (NH = Non-Hispanic) | Pop 2010 | Pop 2020 | % 2010 | % 2020 |
|---|---|---|---|---|
| White alone (NH) | 66 | 53 | 46.81% | 46.49% |
| Black or African American alone (NH) | 74 | 60 | 52.48% | 52.63% |
| Native American or Alaska Native alone (NH) | 0 | 0 | 0.00% | 0.00% |
| Asian alone (NH) | 0 | 0 | 0.00% | 0.00% |
| Pacific Islander alone (NH) | 0 | 0 | 0.00% | 0.00% |
| Some Other Race alone (NH) | 0 | 0 | 0.00% | 0.00% |
| Mixed Race or Multi-Racial (NH) | 1 | 1 | 0.71% | 0.88% |
| Hispanic or Latino (any race) | 0 | 0 | 0.00% | 0.00% |
| Total | 141 | 114 | 100.00% | 100.00% |

As of the census of 2000, there were 146 people, 58 households, and 41 families residing in the town. The population density was 141.8 inhabitants per square mile (54.7/km^{2}). There were 71 housing units at an average density of 68.9 per square mile (26.6/km^{2}). The racial makeup of the town was 52.05% Black or African American, 47.26% White and 0.68% from two or more races.

There were 58 households, out of which 25.9% had children under the age of 18 living with them, 48.3% were married couples living together, 19.0% had a female householder with no husband present, and 27.6% were non-families. 25.9% of all households were made up of individuals, and 12.1% had someone living alone who was 65 years of age or older. The average household size was 2.52 and the average family size was 3.05.

In the town, the population was spread out, with 24.0% under the age of 18, 9.6% from 18 to 24, 23.3% from 25 to 44, 26.0% from 45 to 64, and 17.1% who were 65 years of age or older. The median age was 36 years. For every 100 females, there were 97.3 males. For every 100 females age 18 and over, there were 85.0 males.

The median income for a household in the town was $38,125, and the median income for a family was $41,750. Males had a median income of $21,250 versus $20,000 for females. The per capita income for the town was $12,764. There were 8.9% of families and 13.9% of the population living below the poverty line, including 26.3% of under eighteens and 6.1% of those over 64.

== Notable persons ==
- Razzy Bailey (1939–2021), country music artist
- John McDade Howell (1922–2016), president of East Carolina University from 1982 to 1987

== Gallery ==
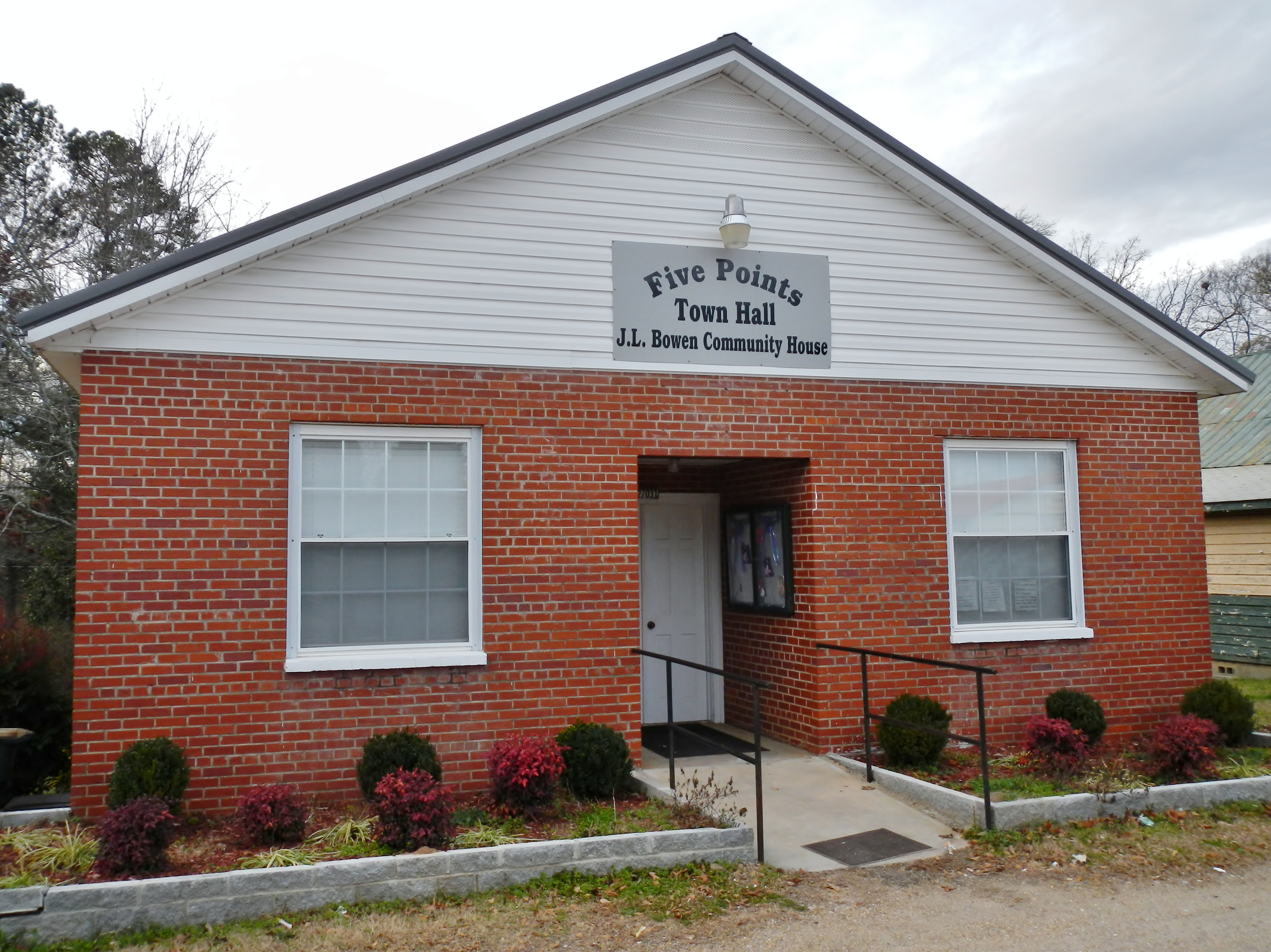
Five Points Town Hall and J.L. Bowen Community House

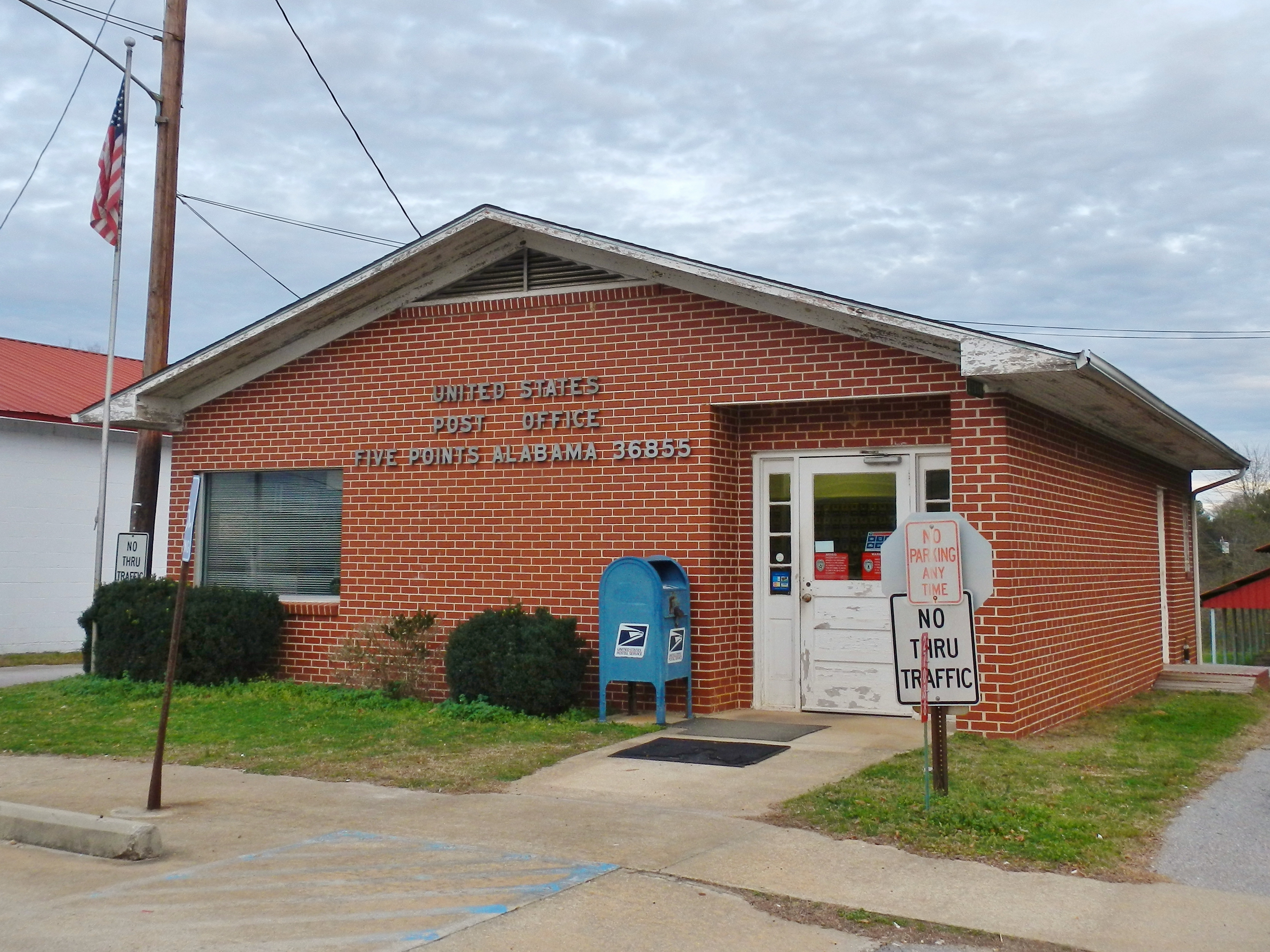
Five Points Post Office (ZIP Code: 36855)
