= Milltown, Alabama =

- Unincorporated community
- Location within Alabama Location within the United States
- Coordinates: 33°03′16″N 85°29′05″W
- Country: United States
- State: Alabama
- County: Chambers
- Elevation: 653 ft (199 m)
- Time zone: UTC-6 (Central (CST))
  - Summer (DST): UTC-5 (CDT)
- Area code: 334
- GNIS feature ID: 152338

Milltown, also known as Graggs Mill or Woodville, is an unincorporated community in Chambers County, Alabama, United States. Milltown is located along Alabama State Route 77, 12.3 miles (19.8 km) north-northwest of LaFayette.

== History ==
Milltown was originally called Graggs Mill after the gristmill operated there by William Graggs. The name was then changed to Woodville, but that was soon changed to Milltown, since a Woodville already existed in Alabama. A post office operated under the name Milltown from 1848 to 1955.
