= Catharine Webb Barber =

American author, newspaper editor

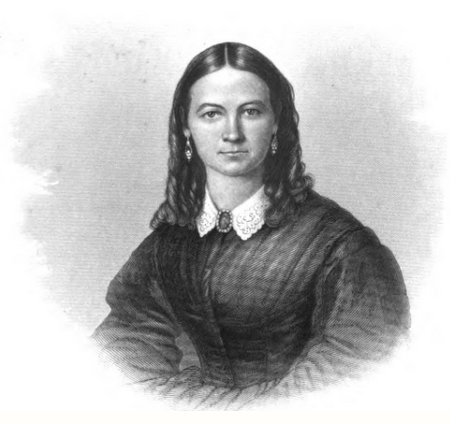
- Born: October 25, 1823; Charlemont, Massachusetts, U.S.
- Died: November 15, 1893 (aged 70); Columbus, Georgia, U.S.
- Occupations: teacher; newspaper editor; author
- Spouse: John Culbreath Towles (m. 1867; died 1877) Jett T. McCoy (m. 1884; died 1887)
- Writing career
- Language: English

Catharine Webb Barber (née, Barber; after first marriage, Towles or Towle; after second marriage, McCoy; October 25, 1823 - November 15, 1893) was an American teacher, newspaper editor, and author. She was born in Massachusetts, but came South, settling first in Georgia and afterward in Alabama. According to The Alabama Review, 1983,— "Establishing a bibliography of the works of Catharine W . Barber Towles McCoy is as difficult as establishing the facts of her life. Only a few of her numerous contributions to ephemeral Georgia periodicals can now definitely be known."

== Early life and education ==
Catharine (Note: Her given name was sometimes spelled, "Catherine" or "Katherine".) Webb Barber was born in Charlemont, a village on the banks of the Deerfield River, in Franklin County, Massachusetts, October 25, 1823. (Note: Herringshaw 1914 gives: October 26, 1823 as date of birth.) She was the youngest of ten children of Rufus Barber, of Worcester, Massachusetts, a New England farmer. In 1843, her father died. (Note: According to Wilson & Fiske 1889, Barber's father died in 1846.)

At the advice of her brother, Barber entered the Lafayette Female Seminary, at Chambers Court House, Alabama.

== Career ==
After completing her education, Barber taught in the same female seminary.

Barber began to write verses for the newspapers at an early age. From 1849 to 1852, in Madison, Georgia, she served as editor of the Madison Visitor. In 1861, she moved to Newnan, Georgia, and became editor of the Southern Literary Companion, which she continued to edit until its suspension in 1865. For several newspapers and magazines, she filled the role of the "Women's Department" editor.

In 1866, she became the editor and proprietor of Miss Barber's Weekly, which she continued till her marriage to John Culbreath Towles (1813-1877), of Lafayette, in 1867.

She published Stories for the Freemason's Fireside (New York, 1860); The Three Golden Links (Cassville, Georgia, 1857); and Poor Claire, or Life Among the Queer (1888). Her novelette Briarbrook (1866) was published by Scott's Monthly Magazine.

== Personal life ==
In 1884, she married Jett T. McCoy (1823-1887). After his death in 1887, she resided at Columbus, Georgia.

She died November 15, 1893, in Columbus, Georgia.

== Awards and honors ==
She received honorary degrees from southern colleges.

== Selected works ==
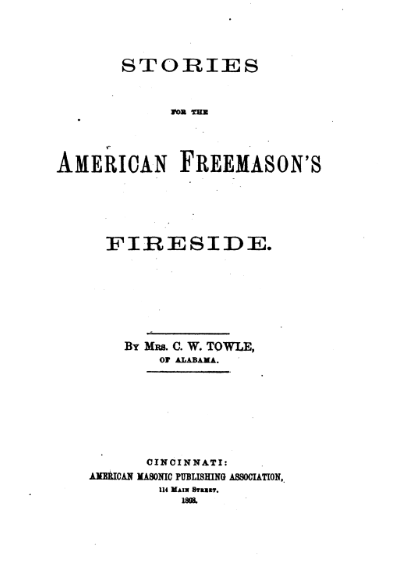

- The Three Golden Links (Cassville, Georgia, 1857)
- Stories for the American Freemason's Fireside (1860)
- Briarbrook (1866)
- Poor Claire, or Life Among the Queer (1888)
