= Pete Turnham =

American politician (1920–2019)

Member of the Alabama House of Representatives from the 79th district
- In office 1958–1998

Personal details
- Born: Pete Benton Turnham; January 1, 1920 Penton, Alabama, U.S.
- Died: September 30, 2019 (aged 99) Auburn, Alabama, U.S.
- Party: Democratic
- Spouse: Netye Kathryn Earnest (m. 1943; died 2016)
- Education: Auburn University
- Profession: travelling salesman, education advocate

Military service
- Branch/service: United States Army
- Years of service: 1944–1959
- Rank: Captain
- Battles/wars: World War II

Pete Benton Turnham (January 1, 1920 – September 30, 2019) was a politician in the American state of Alabama.

== Early life and education ==
Turnham was born in Penton, Alabama, to Joseph Henry and Fannie May (née Sessions) Turnham. After attending schools in Abanda, Alabama and Milltown, Alabama, he attended Auburn University (then Alabama Polytechnic Institute). He served in the United States Army during World War II where he also attended the University of Paris. He would later retire as a captain in the Infantry Reserve in 1959, having commanded combat infantry units in Europe during the war. For his service, he was awarded a Bronze Star. After the war, he attended classes at Pennsylvania State University, and was employed by the Marshall and Bruce Company, as a sales representative.

== Career ==
Turnham started off his political career as a member of the Lee County School Board, from which he served from 1955 to 1958. In 1958 he was elected to the Alabama House of Representatives, representing Lee County (district 79), as a Democrat. He would serve until 1998, with his 40 years being the longest in the state's history. He was known for introducing legislation regarding education and agriculture, and upon completion of his term was bestowed the term "Dean of the Alabama Legislature" in recognition of his long service in a resolution. During his time he also served, among many, on the Education Committee and as vice-chairman of the Ways and Means Committee.

During his legislative term, he also served as president of Alabama Contract Sales. He was also associated with the Gamma Sigma Delta Honor Society of Agriculture and Phi Delta Kappa Honor Society of Education. He was recognized by his alma mater, Auburn University, in 1998 with the Legislative Action Network with its first ever Legislative Tiger Award. In 2003, he was honoured by the Alabama Agricultural Hall. The Alabama Association for Public Continuing and Adult Education's Pete Turnham Scholarship is named after him.

== Personal life ==
He married Netye Kathryn Earnest in 1943 and had four children with her, including Alabama politician Joe Turnham. He was a Baptist and resided in Auburn. Turnham died on September 30, 2019, at the age of 99.
