= Red Level =

Red Level may refer to any of five places in the United States:

- Red Level, Chambers County, Alabama
- Red Level, Covington County, Alabama
- Red Level, Montgomery County, Alabama
- Red Level, Florida
- Red Level, Texas
