= Hoyt L. Sherman =

American artist and professor (1903–1981)

Hoyt L. Sherman (1903–1981) was an American artist and professor. He is widely credited with having a serious influence on the work of Roy Lichtenstein, who was a student of his during the forties.

Hoyt Leon Sherman was born in Lafayette, Alabama.

As a professor in Fine Arts at Ohio State University, he employed the "flash room", a darkened room where images would be briefly flashed onto the screen. The students were then to draw what they had seen. This method of grasping an image by copying it would later be cited by Lichtenstein as having had an influence on his work. Hoyt Sherman was also known for his work with optics in the field of visual art, developing a theory similar to Hans Hofmann's "Push and Pull."

Hoyt Sherman had other notable students including e.l. sauselen and Larry Shineman, who both also went on to teach at Ohio State University in the Fine Arts, Earl Hassenpflug, director of the Otterbein College Art Department, and professors JoAnne Stichweh and Al Germanson, who continued teaching Sherman's "Flashlab" at Ohio State until his retirement. Deborah Beetham-Ford, was an alum who taught art both at Ohio State and at Otterbein College, where she was Acting Director of the Art Department during Earl Hassenpflug's absence, as well as someone who employed Sherman's techniques in her works. Michael Torlen, a student of Sherman, was a long-time faculty member at SUNY Purchase and taught classes that included Sherman's "flash room" techniques, among other investigations into perception by artists.

In 1963 he received the Alumni Award for Distinguished Teaching from Ohio State University. A building in his name, The Hoyt L. Sherman Studio Art Center, was endowed by Roy Lichtenstein in the 1990s. His widow, Rachel Sherman, painter and pianist, died on July 20, 2008.
