= Chambers County, Alabama =

County in Alabama, United States

- County
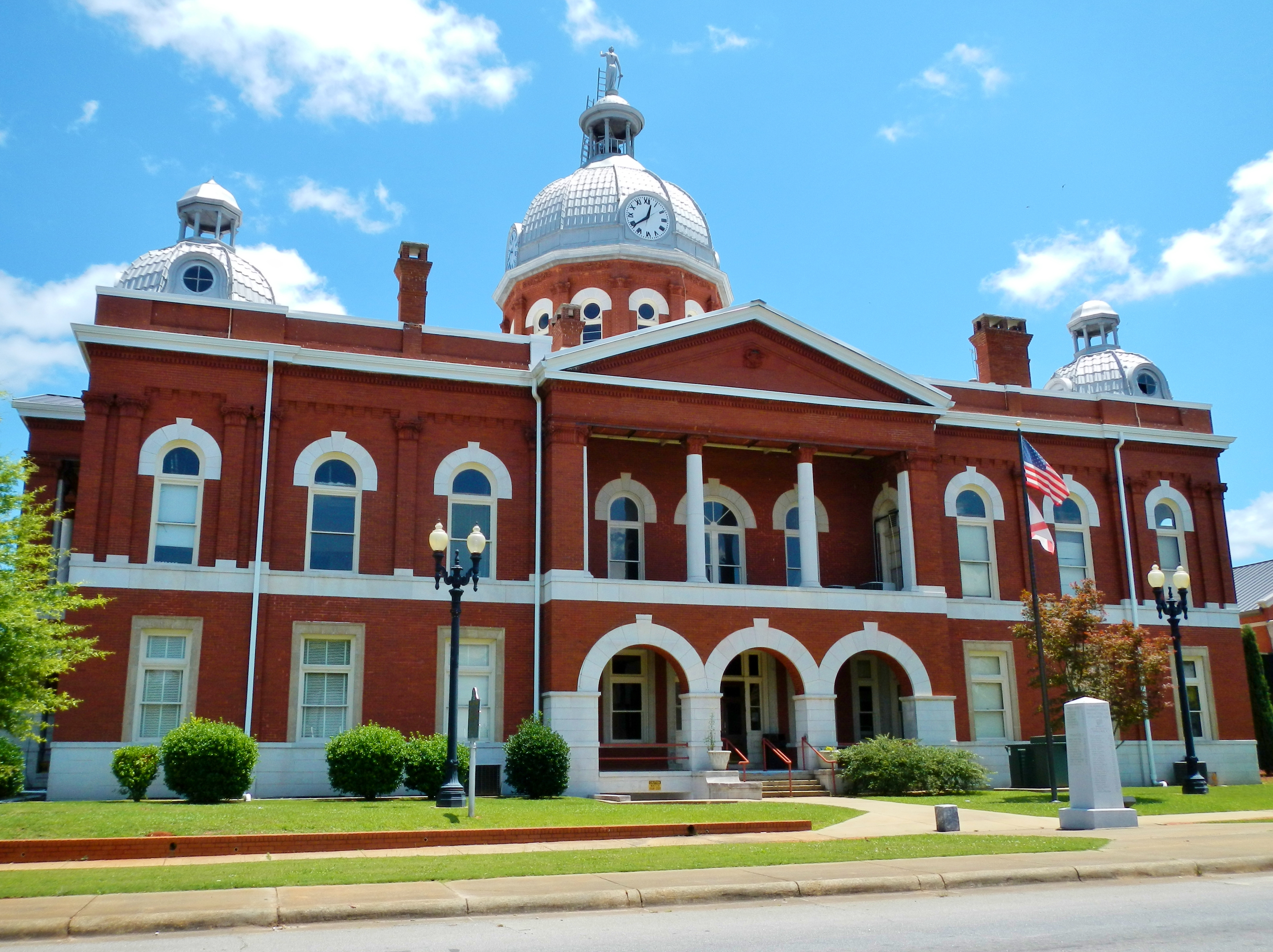
- Chambers County Courthouse in LaFayette, 2012

- Logo

- Location within the U.S. state of Alabama
- Coordinates: 32°54′40″N 85°23′38″W
- Country: United States
- State: Alabama
- Founded: December 18, 1832
- Named for: Henry H. Chambers
- Seat: LaFayette
- Largest city: Valley

Area
  - Total: 603 sq mi (1,560 km^{2})
  - Land: 597 sq mi (1,550 km^{2})
  - Water: 6.6 sq mi (17 km^{2}) 1.1%

Population (2020)
  - Total: 34,772
  - Estimate (2025): 34,253 ▼
  - Density: 58.2/sq mi (22.5/km^{2})
- Time zone: UTC−6 (Central)
  - Summer (DST): UTC−5 (CDT)
- Congressional district: 3rd
- Website: chamberscountyal.gov
- County Number 12 on Alabama Licence Plates

Chambers County is a county located in the east central portion of the U.S. state of Alabama. As of the 2020 census the population was 34,772. Its county seat is LaFayette. Its largest city is Valley. Its name is in honor of Henry H. Chambers, who served as a United States Senator from Alabama.

Chambers County is included in the LaGrange, GA-AL Micropolitan Statistical Area and the Atlanta–Athens-Clarke–Sandy Springs Combined Statistical Area.

== History ==
Prior to contact with people of European descent, what is now Chambers County was inhabited by the Creek nation.

Chambers County was established on December 18, 1832.

Pat Garrett, the lawman famed for killing outlaw Billy the Kid, was born near the town of Cusseta in 1850.

Joe Louis "The Brown Bomber", renowned heavyweight boxing champion, was born near LaFayette, on Buckalew Mountain, May 13, 1914.

In 1980, Chambers County joined its four mill villages to make the city of Valley. Today, it is the largest city in the county.

== Geography ==
According to the United States Census Bureau, the county has a total area of 603 square miles (1,560 km^{2}), of which 597 square miles (1,550 km^{2}) is land and 6.6 square miles (17 km^{2}) (1.1%) is water.

=== Major highways ===
- Interstate 85
- U.S. Highway 29 / State Route 15 (unsigned)
- U.S. Highway 280 / State Route 38 (unsigned)
- U.S. Highway 431 / State Route 1 (unsigned)
- State Route 22
- State Route 50
- State Route 77
- State Route 147

=== Adjacent counties ===
- Randolph County (north)
- Troup County, Georgia (east/EST Border)
- Harris County, Georgia (southeast/EST Border)
- Lee County (south)
- Tallapoosa County (west)

== Demographics ==
Historical population
Census	Pop.	Note	%±
1840	17,333		—
1850	23,960		38.2%
1860	23,214		−3.1%
1870	17,562		−24.3%
1880	23,440		33.5%
1890	26,319		12.3%
1900	32,554		23.7%
1910	36,056		10.8%
1920	41,201		14.3%
1930	39,313		−4.6%
1940	42,146		7.2%
1950	39,528		−6.2%
1960	37,828		−4.3%
1970	36,356		−3.9%
1980	39,191		7.8%
1990	36,876		−5.9%
2000	36,583		−0.8%
2010	34,215		−6.5%
2020	34,772		1.6%
2025 (est.)	34,253	▼	−1.5%
U.S. Decennial Census; 1790–1960 1900–1990; 1990–2000 2010–2020

=== 2020 census ===
As of the 2020 census, the county had a population of 34,772. The median age was 43.3 years. 20.1% of residents were under the age of 18 and 20.6% of residents were 65 years of age or older. For every 100 females there were 94.6 males, and for every 100 females age 18 and over there were 92.6 males age 18 and over.

The racial makeup of the county was 54.2% White, 38.9% Black or African American, 0.3% American Indian and Alaska Native, 1.2% Asian, 0.0% Native Hawaiian and Pacific Islander, 2.0% from some other race, and 3.5% from two or more races. Hispanic or Latino residents of any race comprised 3.6% of the population.

49.3% of residents lived in urban areas, while 50.7% lived in rural areas.

There were 14,238 households in the county, of which 27.4% had children under the age of 18 living with them and 33.5% had a female householder with no spouse or partner present. About 29.8% of all households were made up of individuals and 13.5% had someone living alone who was 65 years of age or older.

There were 16,373 housing units, of which 13.0% were vacant. Among occupied housing units, 66.1% were owner-occupied and 33.9% were renter-occupied. The homeowner vacancy rate was 1.8% and the rental vacancy rate was 8.8%.

=== Racial and ethnic composition ===
Chambers County, Alabama – Racial and ethnic composition Note: the U.S. census treats Hispanic/Latino as an ethnic category. This table excludes Latinos from the racial categories and assigns them to a separate category. Hispanics/Latinos may be of any race.
Race / Ethnicity (NH = Non-Hispanic)	Pop 2000	Pop 2010	Pop 2020	% 2000	% 2010	% 2020
White alone (NH)	22,111	19,893	18,616	60.44%	58.14%	53.34%
Black or African American alone (NH)	13,872	13,206	13,441	37.92%	38.60%	38.65%
Native American or Alaska Native alone (NH)	49	57	71	0.13%	0.17%	0.20%
Asian alone (NH)	68	166	385	0.19%	0.49%	1.11%
Native Hawaiian or Pacific Islander alone (NH)	0	7	11	0.00%	0.02%	0.03%
Other race alone (NH)	13	23	115	0.04%	0.07%	0.33%
Mixed race or Multiracial (NH)	190	327	896	0.52%	0.96%	2.58%
Hispanic or Latino (any race)	280	536	1,237	0.77%	1.57%	3.56%
Total	36,583	34,215	34,772	100.00%	100.00%	100.00%

=== 2010 ===
As of the 2010 census, there were 34,215 people, 13,933 households, and 9,391 families living in the county. The population density was 57 people per square mile (22 people/km^{2}). There were 17,004 housing units at an average density of 28 units per square mile (11 units/km^{2}). The racial makeup of the county was 58.8% White (non-Hispanic), 38.7% Black or African American, 0.2% Native American, 0.5% Asian, 0.6% from other races, and 1.1% from two or more races. 1.6% of the population were Hispanic or Latino of any race. Of the 13,933 households 24.6% had children under the age of 18 living with them, 42.6% were married couples living together, 19.1% had a female householder with no husband present, and 32.6% were non-families. 29.1% of households were one person and 12.3% were one person aged 65 or older. The average household size was 2.42 and the average family size was 2.97.

The age distribution was 22.5% under the age of 18, 8.1% from 18 to 24, 24.1% from 25 to 44, 28.7% from 45 to 64, and 16.7% 65 or older. The median age was 41.5 years. For every 100 females there were 91.7 males. For every 100 females age 18 and over, there were 94.7 males.

The median household income was $31,467 and the median family income was $39,475. Males had a median income of $34,176 versus $29,140 for females. The per capita income for the county was $16,626. About 16.4% of families and 20.3% of the population were below the poverty line, including 30.2% of those under age 18 and 15.7% of those age 65 or over.

=== 2000 ===
As of the 2000 census, there were 36,583 people, 14,522 households, and 10,194 families living in the county. The population density was 61 people per square mile (24 people/km^{2}). There were 16,256 housing units at an average density of 27 units per square mile (10 units/km^{2}). The racial makeup of the county was 56.88% White (non-Hispanic), 43.11% Black or African American, 0.13% Native American, 0.19% Asian, 0.12% from other races, and 0.57% from two or more races. 3.7% of the population were Hispanic or Latino of any race. Of the 14,522 households 29.30% had children under the age of 18 living with them, 48.50% were married couples living together, 17.40% had a female householder with no husband present, and 29.80% were non-families. 27.00% of households were one person and 12.40% were one person aged 65 or older. The average household size was 2.48 and the average family size was 3.01.

The age distribution was 24.60% under the age of 18, 8.60% from 18 to 24, 27.00% from 25 to 44, 23.50% from 45 to 64, and 16.20% 65 or older. The median age was 38 years. For every 100 females there were 89.60 males. For every 100 females age 18 and over, there were 85.30 males.

The median household income was $29,667 and the median family income was $36,598. Males had a median income of $28,771 versus $21,159 for females. The per capita income for the county was $15,147. About 14.30% of families and 17.00% of the population were below the poverty line, including 22.50% of those under age 18 and 18.20% of those age 65 or over.

== Education ==
Chambers County contains two public school districts. There are approximately 4,350 students in public PK-12 schools in Chambers County.

=== Districts ===
School districts include:

- Chambers County School District
- Lanett City School District

== Government ==
Chambers is a Republican-leaning county, although it has a sufficient Black minority to return a respectable Democratic vote. The last Democrat to win a majority in the county was Jimmy Carter in 1980, although Bill Clinton won pluralities in it in both 1992 and 1996.

United States presidential election results for Chambers County, Alabama
Year	Republican		Democratic		Third party(ies)	
Year	No.	%	No.	%	No.	%
1904	74	4.73%	1,421	90.80%	70	4.47%
1908	50	4.53%	1,025	92.84%	29	2.63%
1912	28	1.71%	1,486	90.83%	122	7.46%
1916	168	8.99%	1,679	89.88%	21	1.12%
1920	322	13.82%	1,994	85.58%	14	0.60%
1924	146	6.91%	1,922	91.00%	44	2.08%
1928	1,732	63.42%	999	36.58%	0	0.00%
1932	342	11.78%	2,550	87.84%	11	0.38%
1936	112	2.99%	3,626	96.90%	4	0.11%
1940	110	2.58%	4,141	97.16%	11	0.26%
1944	194	5.30%	3,458	94.43%	10	0.27%
1948	218	12.34%	0	0.00%	1,549	87.66%
1952	990	13.77%	6,155	85.61%	45	0.63%
1956	1,448	21.49%	5,165	76.67%	124	1.84%
1960	1,865	26.26%	5,165	72.74%	71	1.00%
1964	4,630	64.42%	0	0.00%	2,557	35.58%
1968	1,082	10.17%	1,358	12.77%	8,196	77.06%
1972	8,716	79.21%	2,076	18.87%	211	1.92%
1976	5,488	46.32%	6,164	52.03%	196	1.65%
1980	4,864	40.88%	6,649	55.88%	386	3.24%
1984	8,024	59.60%	5,302	39.38%	137	1.02%
1988	7,694	59.39%	5,103	39.39%	159	1.23%
1992	5,682	43.40%	5,938	45.36%	1,471	11.24%
1996	4,707	42.42%	5,515	49.70%	875	7.89%
2000	6,037	51.01%	5,616	47.46%	181	1.53%
2004	7,622	58.49%	5,347	41.03%	63	0.48%
2008	8,067	53.94%	6,799	45.46%	90	0.60%
2012	7,626	52.13%	6,871	46.97%	132	0.90%
2016	7,843	56.42%	5,784	41.61%	273	1.96%
2020	8,753	57.27%	6,365	41.64%	166	1.09%
2024	8,711	61.15%	5,405	37.94%	129	0.91%

United States Senate election results for Chambers County, Alabama2
Year	Republican		Democratic		Third party(ies)	
Year	No.	%	No.	%	No.	%
2020	8,312	54.56%	6,908	45.35%	14	0.09%

United States Senate election results for Chambers County, Alabama3
Year	Republican		Democratic		Third party(ies)	
Year	No.	%	No.	%	No.	%
2022	5,917	65.03%	2,997	32.94%	185	2.03%

Alabama Gubernatorial election results for Chambers County
Year	Republican		Democratic		Third party(ies)	
Year	No.	%	No.	%	No.	%
2022	5,961	65.13%	2,890	31.58%	301	3.29%

== Communities ==
=== Cities ===
- LaFayette (County Seat)
- Lanett
- Valley

=== Towns ===
- Cusseta
- Five Points
- Waverly (Partly in Lee County)

=== Census-designated places ===
- Abanda
- Fredonia
- Huguley
- Penton
- Standing Rock

=== Unincorporated communities ===
- Milltown
- Oak Bowery
- Oakland
- Red Level
- Stroud
- Welch
- White Plains

=== Ghost town ===
- Cedric

== In popular culture ==
Chambers County has been the backdrop of several movies including Mississippi Burning.

== See also ==
- National Register of Historic Places listings in Chambers County, Alabama
- Properties on the Alabama Register of Landmarks and Heritage in Chambers County, Alabama
