= Welch, Alabama =

- Unincorporated community
- Location within Alabama Location within the United States
- Coordinates: 33°05′17″N 85°20′22″W
- Country: United States
- State: Alabama
- County: Chambers
- Elevation: 860 ft (260 m)
- Time zone: UTC-6 (Central (CST))
  - Summer (DST): UTC-5 (CDT)
- Area code: 334
- GNIS feature ID: 128716

Welch, also known as Welsh, is an unincorporated community in Chambers County, Alabama, United States.

== History ==
Welch is likely named for a local family. A post office operated under the name Welsh from 1888 to 1933.
