= Penton, Alabama =

- Census-designated place
- Location of Penton in Chambers County, Alabama.
- Coordinates: 33°00′20″N 85°29′36″W
- Country: United States
- State: Alabama
- County: Chambers

Area
  - Total: 9.17 sq mi (23.76 km^{2})
  - Land: 9.14 sq mi (23.66 km^{2})
  - Water: 0.035 sq mi (0.09 km^{2})
- Elevation: 807 ft (246 m)

Population (2020)
  - Total: 163
  - Density: 17.8/sq mi (6.89/km^{2})
- Time zone: UTC-6 (Central (CST))
  - Summer (DST): UTC-5 (CDT)
- Area code: 334
- GNIS feature ID: 2582693

Penton is a census-designated place and unincorporated community in Chambers County, Alabama, United States. Its population was 163 as of the 2020 census which is down from a population of 201 people at the 2010 census.

== Demographics ==
Historical population
Census	Pop.	Note	%±
2010	201		—
2020	163		−18.9%
U.S. Decennial Census; 1850-1870 1870-1880; 1890-1910 1920 1930; 1940 1950 1960; 1970 1980 1990; 2000 2010

Penton was first listed as a census designated place in the 2010 U.S. census.

Penton CDP, Alabama – Racial and ethnic composition Note: the US Census treats Hispanic/Latino as an ethnic category. This table excludes Latinos from the racial categories and assigns them to a separate category. Hispanics/Latinos may be of any race.
Race / Ethnicity (NH = Non-Hispanic)	Pop 2010	Pop 2020	% 2010	% 2020
White alone (NH)	140	137	69.65%	84.05%
Black or African American alone (NH)	50	19	24.88%	11.66%
Native American or Alaska Native alone (NH)	0	0	0.00%	0.00%
Asian alone (NH)	0	1	0.00%	0.61%
Native Hawaiian or Pacific Islander alone (NH)	0	0	0.00%	0.00%
Other race alone (NH)	1	1	0.50%	0.61%
Mixed race or Multiracial (NH)	1	4	0.50%	2.45%
Hispanic or Latino (any race)	9	1	4.48%	0.61%
Total	201	163	100.00%	100.00%

== Notable person ==
- Pete Turnham, served in the Alabama House of Representatives in District 79 from 1958 to 1998
