= Oakland, Chambers County, Alabama =

Oakland, Alabama
- Unincorporated community
- Location within Alabama Location within the United States
- Coordinates: 33°00′49″N 85°14′20″W
- Country: United States
- State: Alabama
- County: Chambers
- Elevation: 679 ft (207 m)
- Time zone: UTC-6 (Central (CST))
  - Summer (DST): UTC-5 (CDT)
- GNIS feature ID: 156819

Oakland is an unincorporated community in Chambers County, Alabama, United States.
