= Jay Jacobs (athletic director) =

American college athletics director

- Born: October 7, 1960 (age 65); Lafayette, Alabama, U.S.
- Education: B.A., Auburn University, M.B.A., Auburn University
- Occupation: Athletic Director

Jay Jacobs is an American college athletics director who most recently served as the executive associate athletics director for external affairs for the Florida Gators and was the former director of athletics for the Auburn Tigers athletic department from 2004 to 2017. He was named Auburn's 14th director of athletics on December 22, 2004, after working in almost every area of the Auburn athletic department for the previous 20 years. Jacobs announced on November 3, 2017 that he would step down effective June 1, 2018, and a replacement was announced and hired in January 2018.

== Early life ==
Jacobs grew up 20 miles from Auburn in Lafayette, Alabama where he was a lifelong Auburn fan. He attended and graduated in 1979 from Wolfson High School in Jacksonville, Florida, but came back to Auburn for college. He became a walk-on on the Tiger football team and lettered as an offensive tackle in 1982 and 1983. While at Auburn he was a member of Sigma Pi fraternity. In 1983, he was named to the Los Angeles Times Walk-On All American Team and was a member of the SEC championship team. He earned his bachelor's degree in 1985 and his MBA in 1988, both from Auburn.

== Career ==
After he finished playing college football, Jacobs became the football coach at Lee-Scott Academy in Auburn in 1984. In 1985, he was brought back to Auburn athletics as the assistant strength and conditioning coach for the football team. From 1986 to 1988 he was a graduate assistant football coach. He was named conditioning coach in 1988.

He moved into the athletics department office in 1991 when he became assistant athletics director. In 1994, he was made associate athletics director for operations. In 2001, he was named senior associate athletics director where he was in charge of Tigers Unlimited. From 2005 to 2018 he served as Auburn University’s athletics director.

On June 5, 2018 he was hired by the University of Florida Athletic Association to replace Mike Hill as the executive associate athletics director for external affairs.

In June 2023 Jacobs retired after spending 40 years working in collegiate athletics.

=== 2008 football coaching change ===
In December 2008, Jacobs came under considerable criticism for the resignation of head football coach Tommy Tuberville and subsequent hiring of former Iowa State football coach, Gene Chizik.

The public perception of the 2008 coaching search was so negative that it created a groundswell of opposition to Jacobs by many Auburn fans, students and alumni. However, Jacobs was later vindicated when Chizik, in his second year, won the 2011 BCS National Championship Game.
