= White Plains, Chambers County, Alabama =

White Plains, Alabama
- Unincorporated community
- Location within Alabama Location within the United States
- Coordinates: 32°59′32″N 85°23′57″W
- Country: United States
- State: Alabama
- County: Chambers
- Elevation: 1,047 ft (319 m)
- Time zone: UTC-6 (Central (CST))
  - Summer (DST): UTC-5 (CDT)
- Area code: 334
- GNIS feature ID: 157250

White Plains is an unincorporated community in Chambers County, Alabama, United States. White Plains is located along U.S. Route 431, 6.4 miles (10.3 km) north of La Fayette.
