= Chambers County Courthouse Square Historic District =

Historic district in Alabama, United States

- U.S. National Register of Historic Places
- U.S. Historic district
- Alabama Register of Landmarks and Heritage
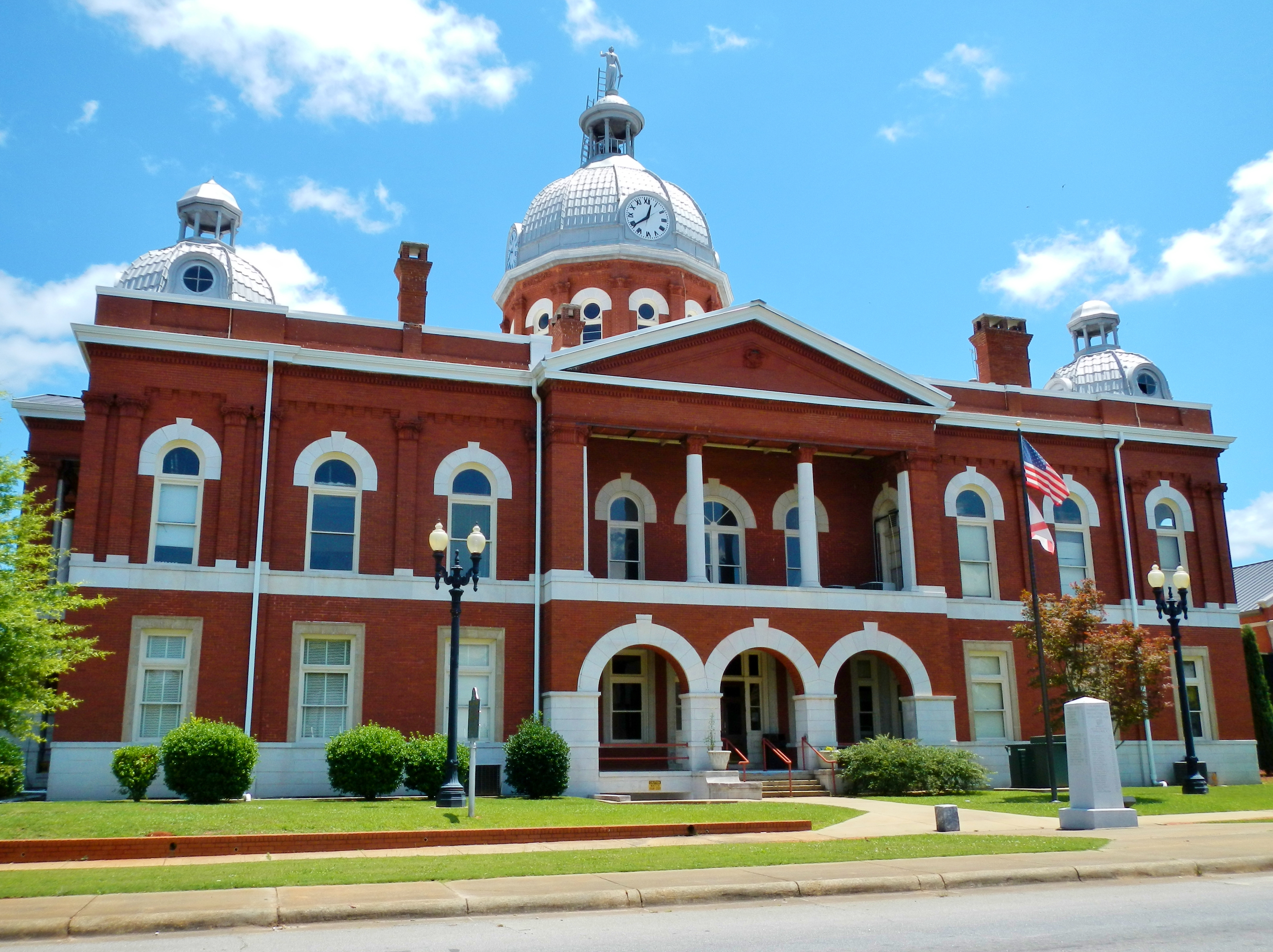
- Chambers County Courthouse in 2012

- Location within Alabama Location within the United States
- Interactive map showing the location of Chambers County Courthouse Square Historic District
- Location: Roughly bounded by Alabama and 2nd Aves., and 1st St., LaFayette, Alabama
- Coordinates: 32°53′58″N 85°24′03″W
- Area: 15 acres (6.1 ha)
- Architect: Multiple
- NRHP reference No.: 80000682

Significant dates
- Added to NRHP: March 27, 1980
- Designated ARLH: June 9, 1976

The Chambers County Courthouse Square Historic District comprises the central portion of LaFayette, Alabama, United States, centered on the Chambers County Courthouse. The courthouse is located in a square, surrounded by an early 20th century commercial district on LaFayette Street, Alabama Avenue, First Street SE and First Avenue. The district includes 63 buildings, of which 45 are considered contributing features. It is described as one of the most intact courthouse squares in Alabama.

The district was added to the National Register of Historic Places on March 27, 1980.
