= Red Level, Chambers County, Alabama =

Red Level, Alabama
- Unincorporated community
- Location within Alabama Location within the United States
- Coordinates: 33°05′23″N 85°28′40″W
- Country: United States
- State: Alabama
- County: Chambers
- Elevation: 797 ft (243 m)
- Time zone: UTC-6 (Central (CST))
  - Summer (DST): UTC-5 (CDT)
- Area code: 334
- GNIS feature ID: 156950

Red Level is an unincorporated community in Chambers County, Alabama, United States.
