= Abanda, Alabama =

- Unincorporated Community
- Location of Abanda in Chambers County, Alabama.
- Coordinates: 33°05′33″N 85°31′31″W
- Country: United States
- State: Alabama
- County: Chambers

Area
  - Total: 3.01 sq mi (7.80 km^{2})
  - Land: 3.00 sq mi (7.76 km^{2})
  - Water: 0.012 sq mi (0.03 km^{2})
- Elevation: 640 ft (200 m)

Population (2020)
  - Total: 133
  - Density: 44.4/sq mi (17.13/km^{2})
- Time zone: UTC-6 (Central (CST))
  - Summer (DST): UTC-5 (CDT)
- ZIP code: 36276
- Area code: 334
- GNIS feature ID: 2582661

Abanda is a census-designated place and unincorporated community in Chambers County, Alabama, United States. Its population was 133 as of the 2020 census.

== History ==
Abanda was founded when the Atlanta, Birmingham and Atlantic Railroad (AB&A) was extended to that point and was named after the acronym. A post office was established at Abanda in 1908 and operated until its discontinuation in 1956.

== Demographics ==
Historical population
Census	Pop.	Note	%±
2010	192		—
2020	133		−30.7%
U.S. Decennial Census; 1850 1860 1870; 1880 1890-1900; 1910 1920 1930; 1940 1950 1960; 1970 1980 1990; 2000 2010 2020

Abanda first appeared as a census-designated place (CDP) in the 2010 U.S. census.

=== 2020 census ===
Abanda CDP, Alabama – Racial and ethnic composition Note: the US Census treats Hispanic/Latino as an ethnic category. This table excludes Latinos from the racial categories and assigns them to a separate category. Hispanics/Latinos may be of any race.
Race / Ethnicity (NH = Non-Hispanic)	Pop 2010	Pop 2020	% 2010	% 2020
White alone (NH)	129	95	67.19%	71.43%
Black or African American alone (NH)	58	34	30.21%	25.56%
Native American or Alaska Native alone (NH)	0	0	0.00%	0.00%
Asian alone (NH)	0	0	0.00%	0.00%
Native Hawaiian or Pacific Islander alone (NH)	0	0	0.00%	0.00%
Other race alone (NH)	0	0	0.00%	0.00%
Mixed race or Multiracial (NH)	2	0	1.04%	0.00%
Hispanic or Latino (any race)	3	4	1.56%	3.01%
Total	192	133	100.00%	100.00%

== Economy ==
The median household income in Abanda is $13,864 which is considerably smaller than the United States average median income of $53,046. Also, versus the state of Alabama, average median income of $43,160, Abanda is approximately a third that size.
