= LaFayette, Alabama =

City in Alabama, United States

LaFayette
- City
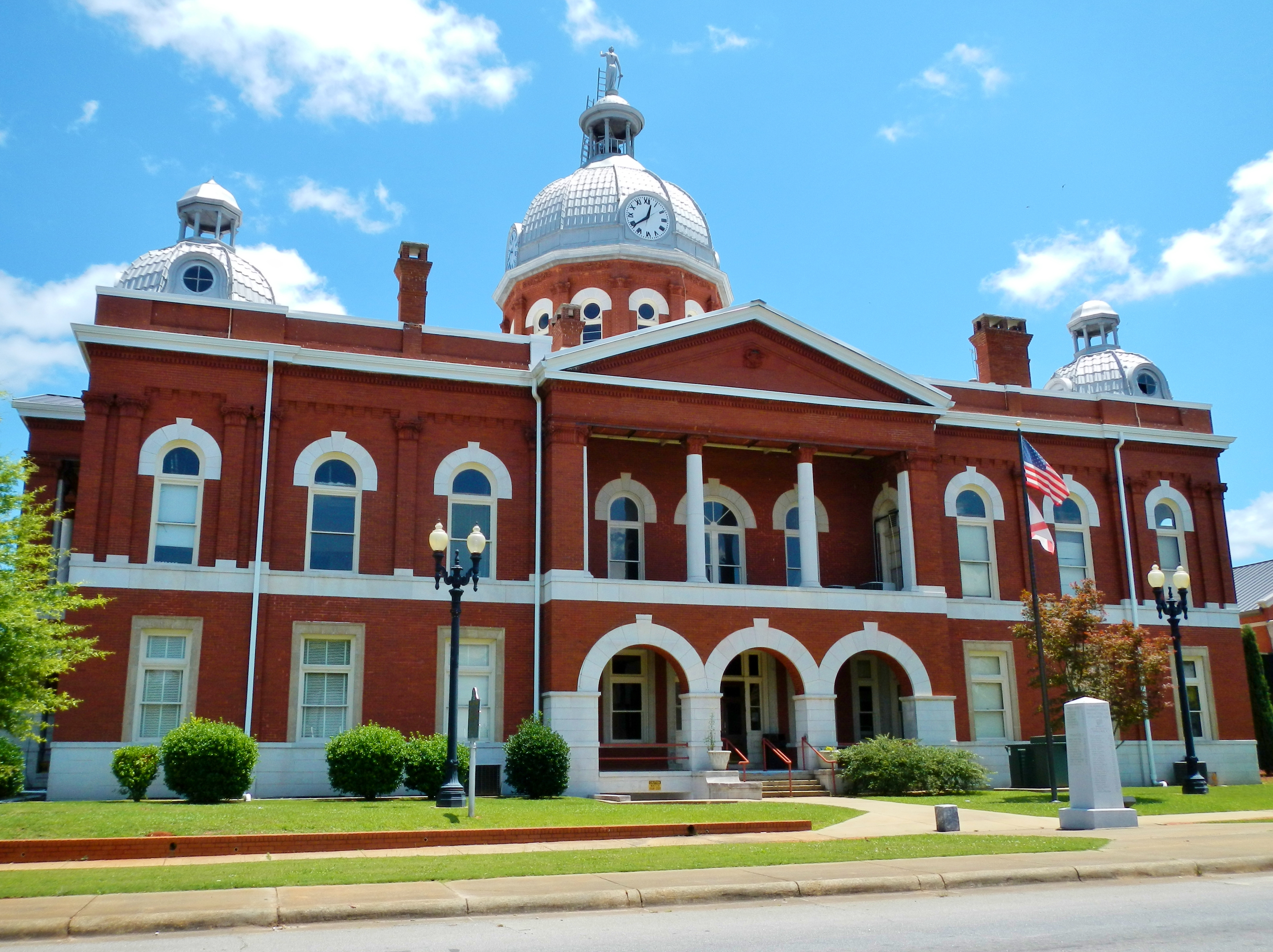
- The Chambers County Courthouse Square in LaFayette.

- Flag Logo

- Location of La Fayette in Chambers County, Alabama.
- Coordinates: 32°53′54″N 85°24′2″W
- Country: United States
- State: Alabama
- County: Chambers
- Incorporated: January 7, 1835
- Named for: Marquis de Lafayette

Government
  - Mayor: Kenneth Vines

Area
  - Total: 8.88 sq mi (23.01 km^{2})
  - Land: 8.86 sq mi (22.94 km^{2})
  - Water: 0.027 sq mi (0.07 km^{2})
- Elevation: 843 ft (257 m)

Population (2020)
  - Total: 2,684
  - Density: 300/sq mi (117/km^{2})
- Time zone: UTC−6 (CST)
  - Summer (DST): UTC−5 (CDT)
- ZIP code: 36862
- Area code: 334
- FIPS code: 01-40672
- GNIS feature ID: 0164071
- Website: cityoflafayetteal.com

LaFayette (/ləˈfeɪɛt, -ˈfaɪ-/ lə-FAY-et, -FY-, /ˈlʌfeɪɛt/ LUF-ay-et) is a city in and the county seat of Chambers County, Alabama, United States, 47 miles (76 km) northwest of Columbus, Georgia. As of the 2010 census, the population of the city was 3,003.

== History ==
Chambers County was formed in 1832. The newly elected county officials opted to locate the county seat as near as possible to the center of the county. Lots for the new town were auctioned in October 1833, with proceeds from the sale financing the construction of a courthouse and jail. The town was first called "Chambersville", but by the time of incorporation on January 7, 1835, the town name had been changed to "Lafayette", named after the Marquis de Lafayette; its spelling was changed to "LaFayette" due to the influence of newspaper editor Johnson J. Hooper, who created a fictional character called Captain Simon Suggs, a backwoods southerner who pronounced the town's name as "La Fait". The city's newspaper, The LaFayette Sun, was founded under the name The Alabama Standard in April 1841 and adopted its current name on August 3, 1881.

On October 2, 1898, John Anderson, a black man, was lynched in Lafayette. Scenes from the movie Mississippi Burning were filmed at the Chambers County Courthouse and in downtown LaFayette.

LaFayette is the birthplace of heavyweight boxing champion Joe Louis. An 8-foot (2.4 m) bronze statue, executed by sculptor Casey Downing Jr. of Mobile, Alabama, was erected in Louis' honor in front of the Chambers County courthouse in 2010. It is also the hometown of Hoyt L. Sherman, one of artist Roy Lichtenstein's principal art professor/mentors at Ohio State University.

== Geography ==
The city is located in east central Alabama along U.S. Route 431, which is the main north–south route through the city. U.S. 431 leads north 21 mi (34 km) to Roanoke and south 23 mi (37 km) to Opelika. Alabama State Route 50 also runs through the city as a southern bypass, leading east 14 mi (23 km) to Lanett on the Alabama-Georgia state line, and southwest 18 mi (29 km) to Camp Hill. Alabama State Route 77 begins in the northern part of the city and connects LaFayette to the town of Wadley, 20 mi (32 km) to the northwest.

According to the U.S. Census Bureau, the city has a total area of 8.9 square miles (23.0 km^{2}), of which 0.027 square miles (0.07 km^{2}), or 0.31%, is water.

=== Climate ===
According to the Köppen climate classification, LaFayette has a humid subtropical climate (abbreviated Cfa).

Climate data for LaFayette, Alabama (1991–2020 normals, extremes 1944–present)
Month	Jan	Feb	Mar	Apr	May	Jun	Jul	Aug	Sep	Oct	Nov	Dec	Year
Record high °F (°C)	84 (29)	86 (30)	89 (32)	93 (34)	98 (37)	103 (39)	107 (42)	105 (41)	100 (38)	99 (37)	87 (31)	81 (27)	107 (42)
Mean daily maximum °F (°C)	55.7 (13.2)	60.0 (15.6)	67.6 (19.8)	75.0 (23.9)	81.7 (27.6)	87.0 (30.6)	90.0 (32.2)	88.9 (31.6)	84.2 (29.0)	75.0 (23.9)	65.4 (18.6)	57.5 (14.2)	74.0 (23.3)
Daily mean °F (°C)	42.9 (6.1)	46.9 (8.3)	53.5 (11.9)	60.3 (15.7)	68.5 (20.3)	75.3 (24.1)	78.7 (25.9)	77.6 (25.3)	72.4 (22.4)	61.8 (16.6)	51.4 (10.8)	45.2 (7.3)	61.2 (16.2)
Mean daily minimum °F (°C)	30.2 (−1.0)	33.8 (1.0)	39.4 (4.1)	45.7 (7.6)	55.3 (12.9)	63.5 (17.5)	67.4 (19.7)	66.3 (19.1)	60.5 (15.8)	48.6 (9.2)	37.5 (3.1)	32.8 (0.4)	48.4 (9.1)
Record low °F (°C)	−7 (−22)	3 (−16)	8 (−13)	25 (−4)	34 (1)	42 (6)	53 (12)	50 (10)	37 (3)	21 (−6)	6 (−14)	−1 (−18)	−7 (−22)
Average precipitation inches (mm)	5.70 (145)	5.33 (135)	5.70 (145)	4.80 (122)	4.40 (112)	4.48 (114)	4.80 (122)	4.23 (107)	3.53 (90)	3.63 (92)	4.31 (109)	5.61 (142)	56.52 (1,436)
Average precipitation days (≥ 0.01 in)	10.4	9.6	9.4	8.8	8.7	10.5	11.0	10.2	7.0	7.2	7.6	9.9	110.3
Source: NOAA

== Demographics ==
Historical population
Census	Pop.	Note	%±
1860	1,113		—
1870	1,382		24.2%
1880	1,061		−23.2%
1890	1,369		29.0%
1900	1,629		19.0%
1910	1,632		0.2%
1920	1,911		17.1%
1930	2,119		10.9%
1940	2,138		0.9%
1950	2,353		10.1%
1960	2,605		10.7%
1970	3,530		35.5%
1980	3,647		3.3%
1990	3,151		−13.6%
2000	3,234		2.6%
2010	3,003		−7.1%
2020	2,684		−10.6%
U.S. Decennial Census; 2013 Estimate

=== 2020 census ===
La Fayette racial composition
Race	Num.	Perc.
White (non-Hispanic)	710	26.45%
Black or African American (non-Hispanic)	1,849	68.89%
Native American	9	0.34%
Asian	6	0.22%
Other/Mixed	35	1.3%
Hispanic or Latino	75	2.79%

As of the 2020 United States census, there were 2,684 people, 1,017 households, and 610 families residing in the city.

=== 2010 census ===
As of the census of 2010, there were 3,003 people, 1,129 households, and 749 families residing in the city. The population density was 337 inhabitants per square mile (130/km^{2}). There were 1,299 housing units at an average density of 145.9 square miles (378 km^{2}). The racial makeup of the city was 68.8% Black or African American, 29.3% White, 0.1% Native American, 0.4% Asian, 0.8% from other races, and 0.7% from two or more races. 1.9% of the population were Hispanic or Latino of any race.

There were 1,129 households, out of which 23.4% had children under the age of 18 living with them, 29.6% were married couples living together, 30.7% had a female householder with no husband present, and 33.7% were non-families. 29.6% of all households were made up of individuals, and 13.2% had someone living alone who was 65 years of age or older. The average household size was 2.43 and the average family size was 2.98.

In the city, the age distribution of the population shows 22.0% under the age of 18, 9.8% from 18 to 24, 23.4% from 25 to 44, 26.8% from 45 to 64, and 18.0% who were 65 years of age or older. The median age was 40.2 years. For every 100 females, there were 87.1 males. For every 100 females age 18 and over, there were 103.5 males.

The median income for a household in the city was $26,319, and the median income for a family was $31,629. Males had a median income of $31,842 versus $27,833 for females. The per capita income for the city was $12,149. About 28.5% of families and 36.2% of the population were below the poverty line, including 43.2% of those under age 18 and 22.9% of those age 65 or over.

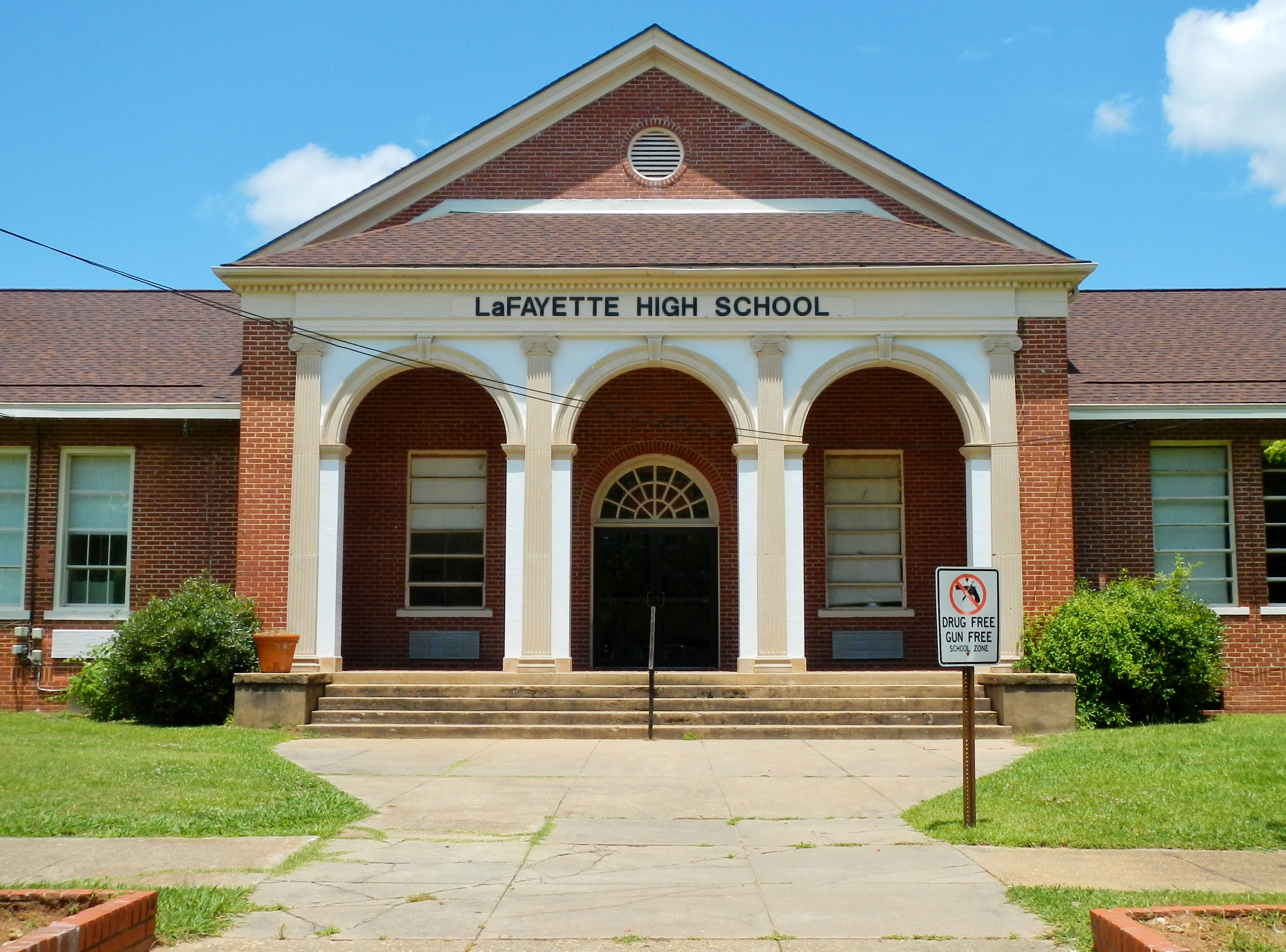
LaFayette High School

== Education ==
The Chambers County School District provides public education for LaFayette. Within the city limits are two high schools (Lafayette High School and the Chambers County Career Technical School), one middle school (JP Powell Middle School), and one elementary school (Eastside Elementary School).

Chambers Academy (grades pre-K through 12) is a private school in LaFayette.

== Notable people ==
- Catharine Webb Barber, attended and taught at the Lafayette Female Seminary, at Chambers Court House
- William B. Bowling, U.S. Representative from 1920 to 1928
- Dave Butz, former NFL player
- James R. Dowdell, jurist and Chief Justice of the Alabama Supreme Court
- Morris Finley, professional basketball player. Graduated from LaFayette High School.
- Hal Finney, former Major League Baseball player
- Lou Finney, former Major League Baseball player
- Perry Griggs, former Baltimore Colts player
- James Thomas "Cotton Tom" Heflin, member of the United States House of Representatives and United States Senate
- Johnson J. Hooper, author and humorist
- Jay Jacobs, former athletic director at Auburn University
- Joe Louis, Heavyweight boxing champion
- Leon Renfroe Meadows, president of East Carolina University from 1934 to 1944
- Arthur W. Mitchell, U.S. Representative from Illinois and first African American to be elected to the United States Congress as a Democrat
- Gertrude Morgan, preacher, missionary, artist, musician, and poet who worked in New Orleans in the 1960s and '70s
- Hoyt L. Sherman, art professor and principal mentor to pop artist Roy Lichtenstein
- Jimmy Stewart, former Major League Baseball player.
- James Still, poet, novelist, and folklorist
- Mike Williams, former tight end for the Washington Commanders

== Gallery ==
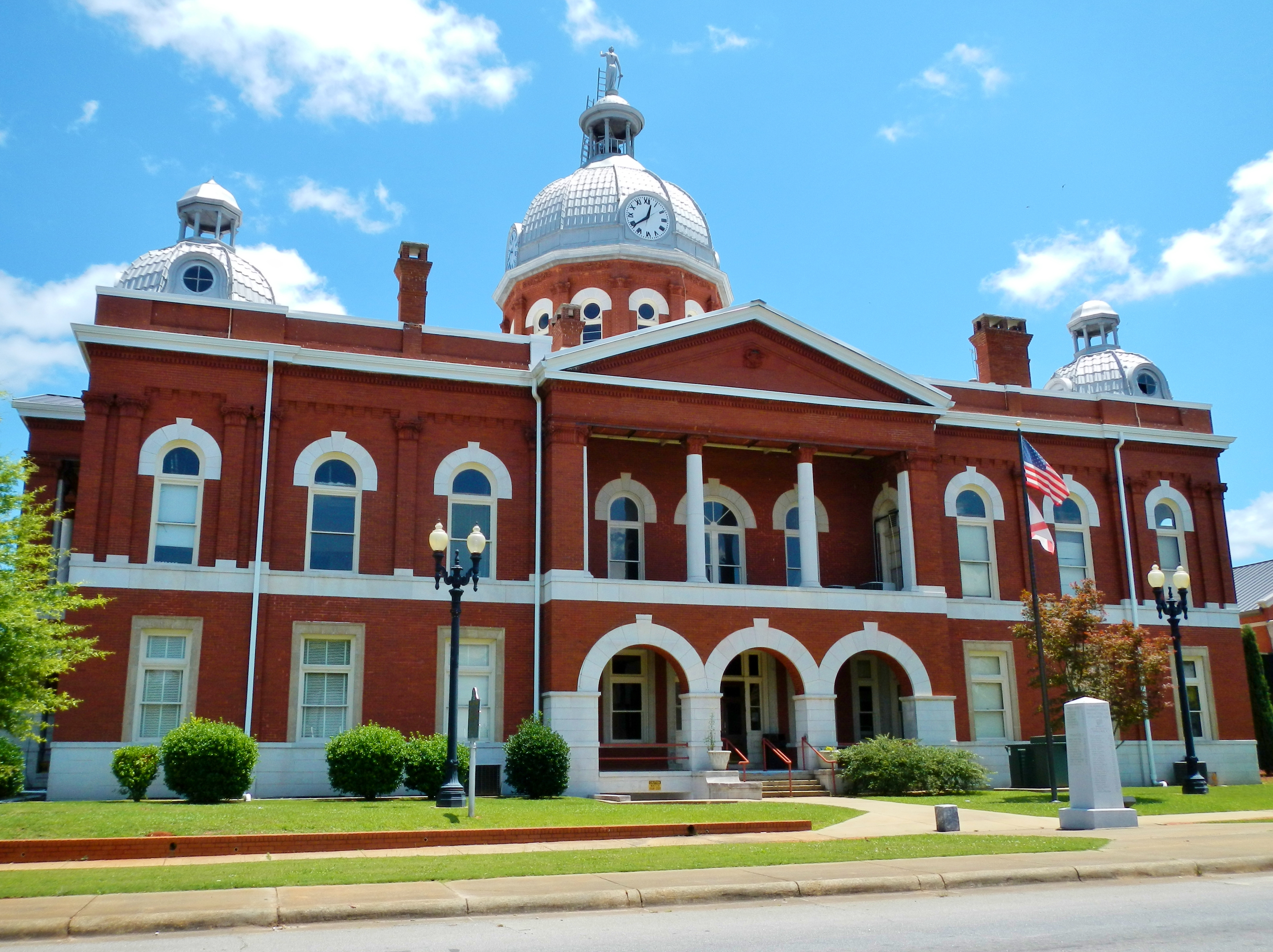
The Chambers County Courthouse in LaFayette is featured prominently in the 1988 movie Mississippi Burning. Chambers County Courthouse Square Historic District was added to the National Register of Historic Places on March 27, 1980.

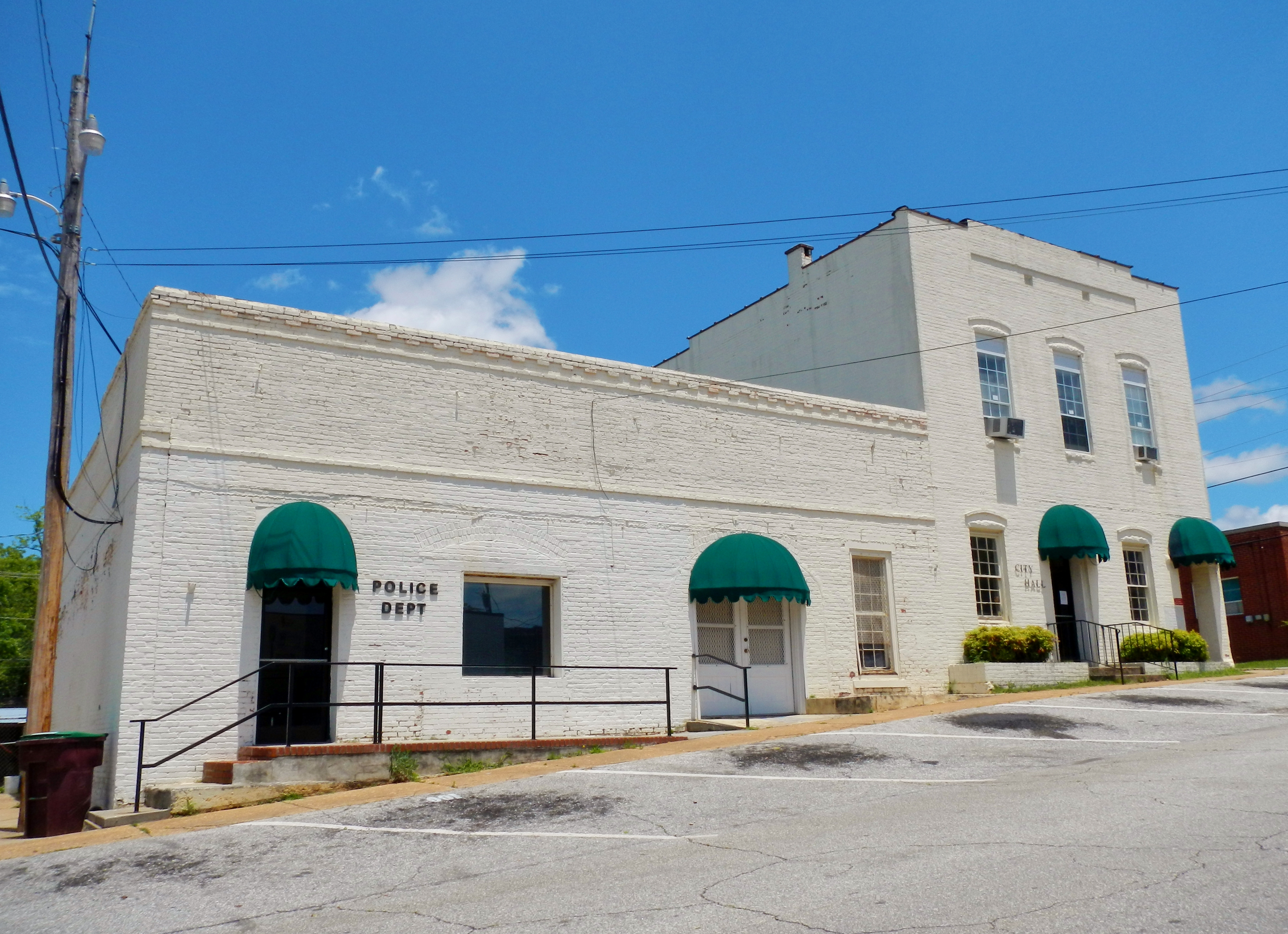
LaFayette City Hall and Police Department.

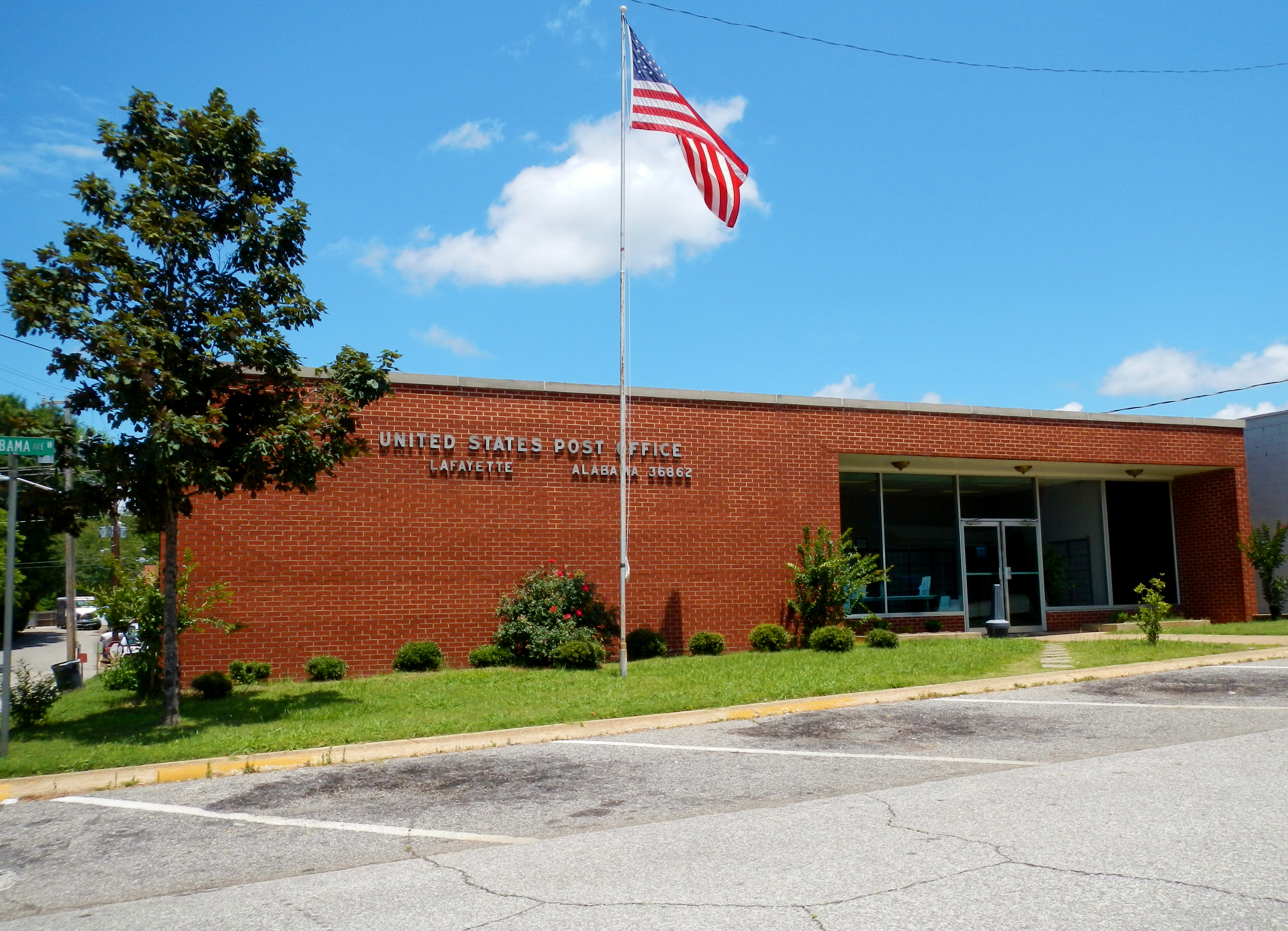
LaFayette Post Office (ZIP code:36862)

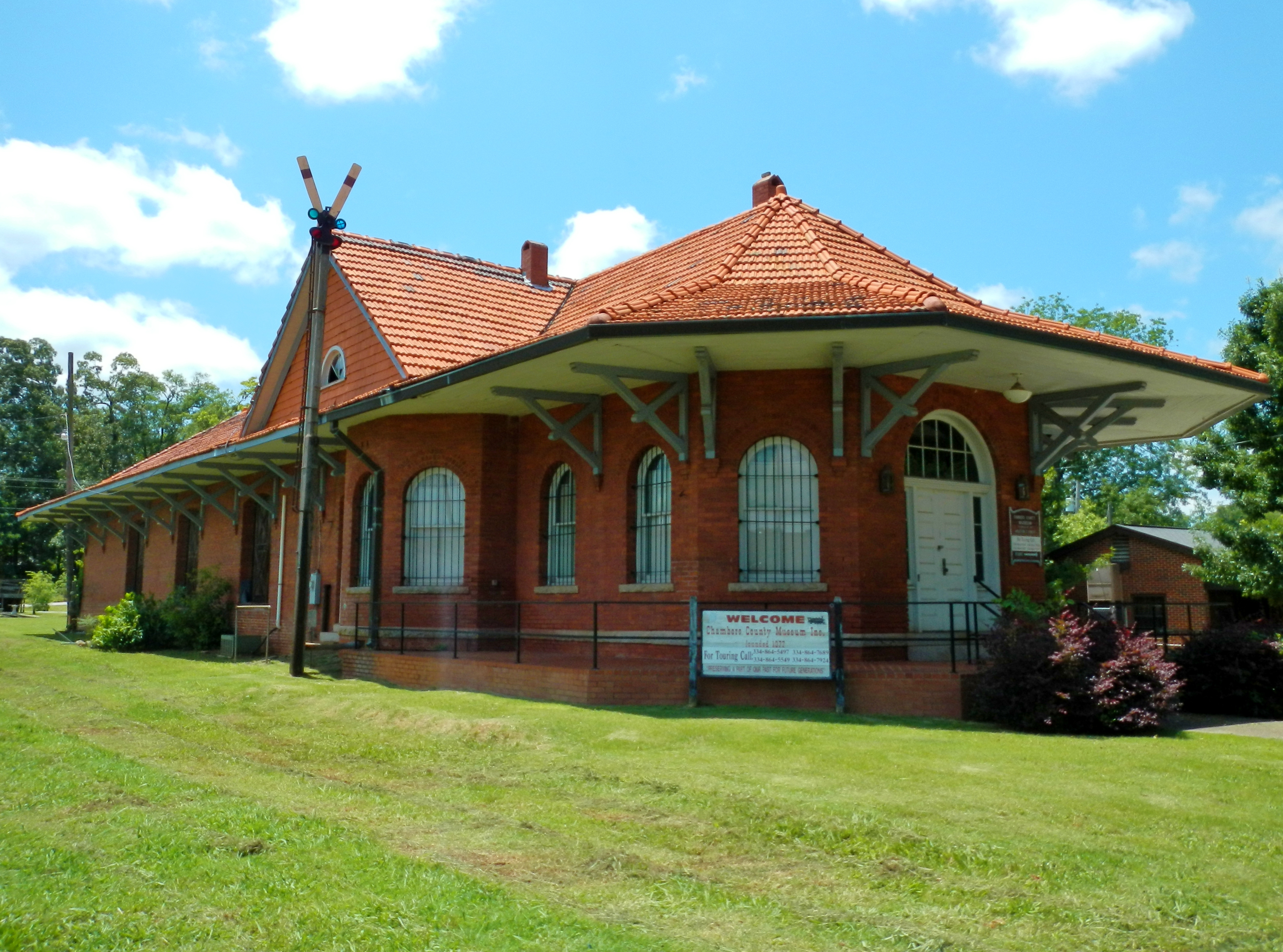
The Chambers County Museum is located in the former Central of Georgia railway depot. The depot was built of masonry construction with a tile roof in 1908 after fire destroyed the original wood structure.

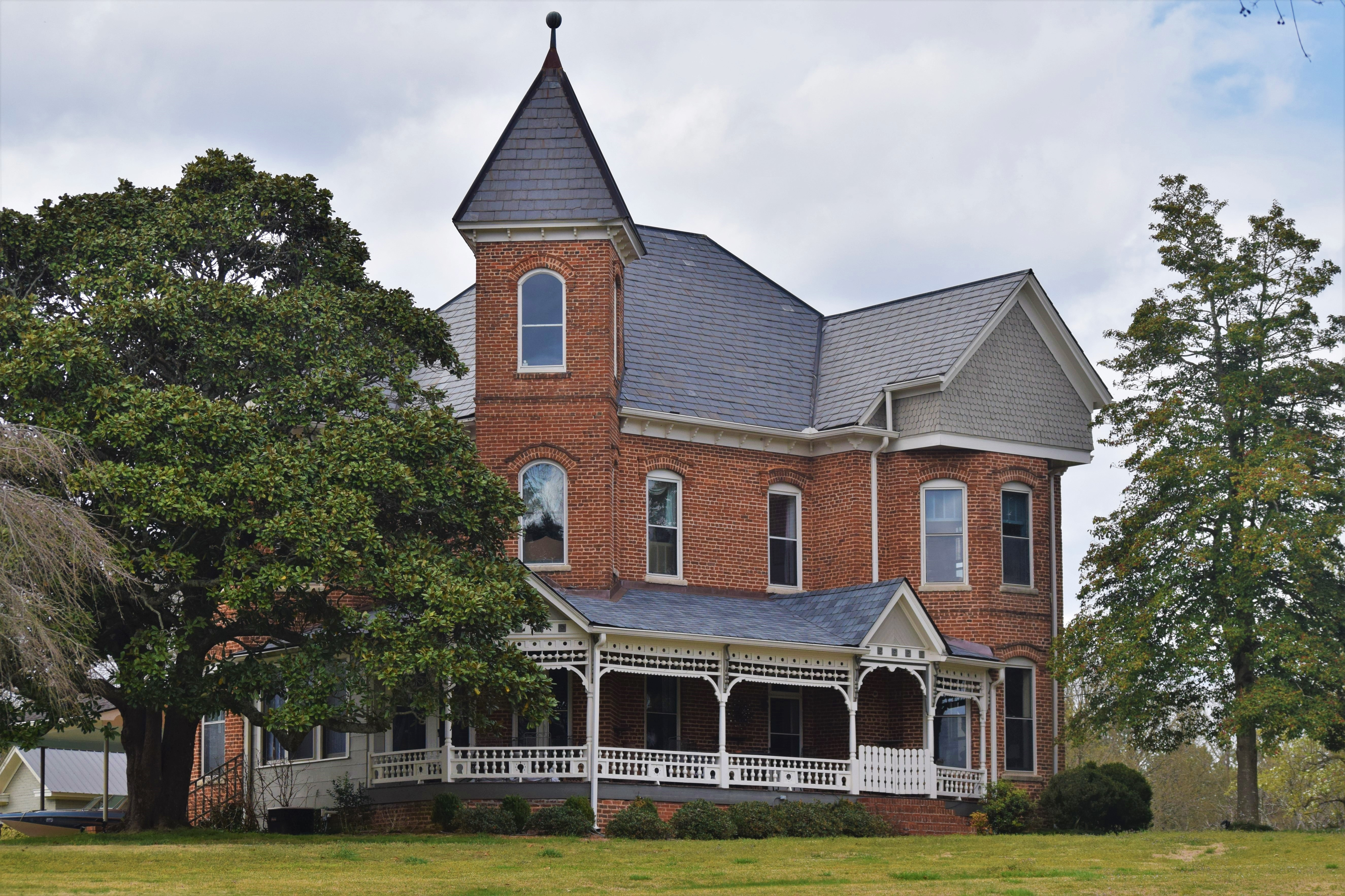
The Ernest McCarty Oliver House was added to the National Register of Historic Places January 21, 1974.

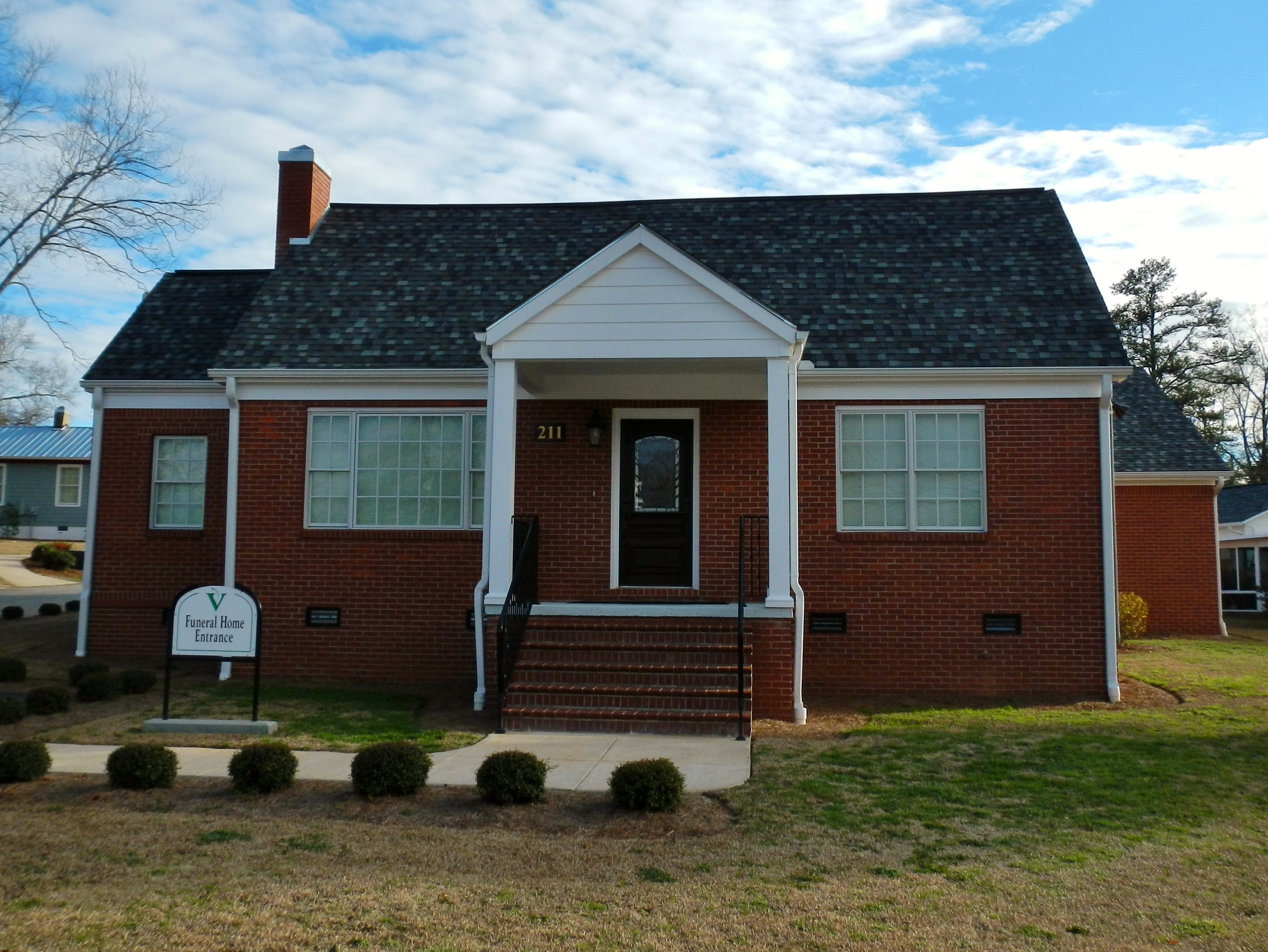
Vines Funeral Home and Ambulance Service was added to the National Register of Historic Places on October 15, 2008.

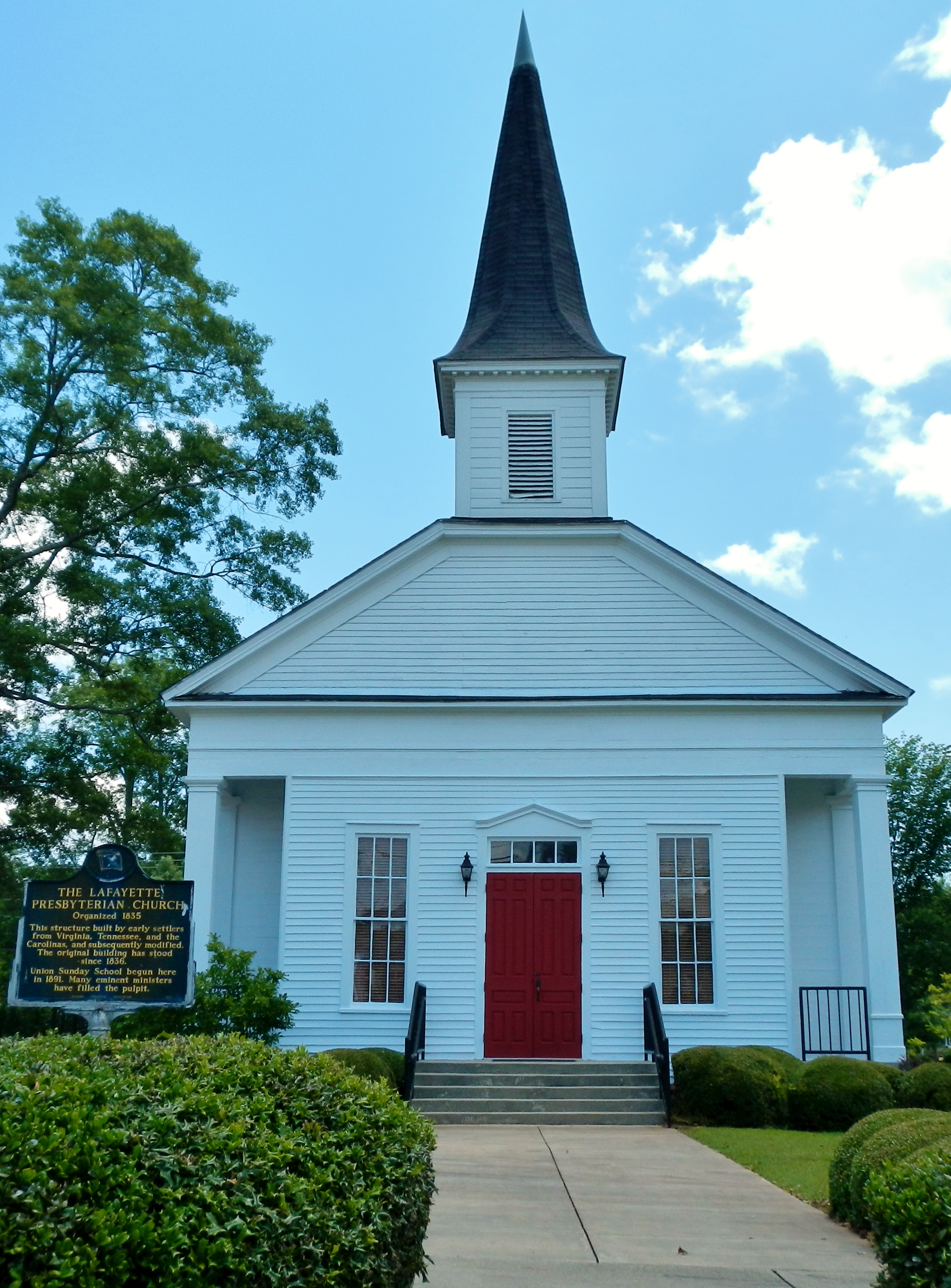
Built by early settlers to the area, the LaFayette Presbyterian Church has stood since 1836.

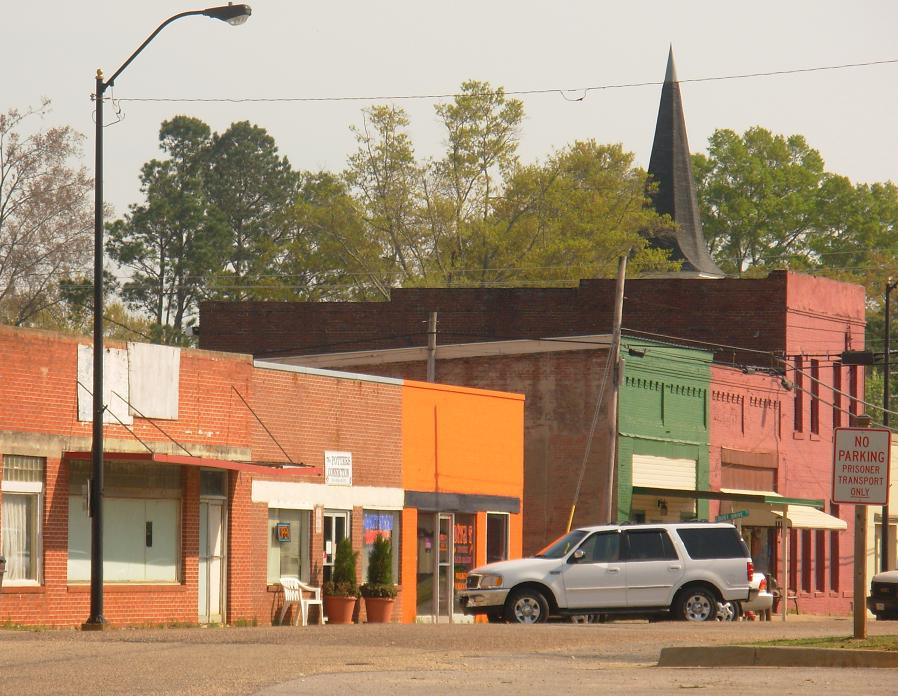
Downtown LaFayette, Alabama

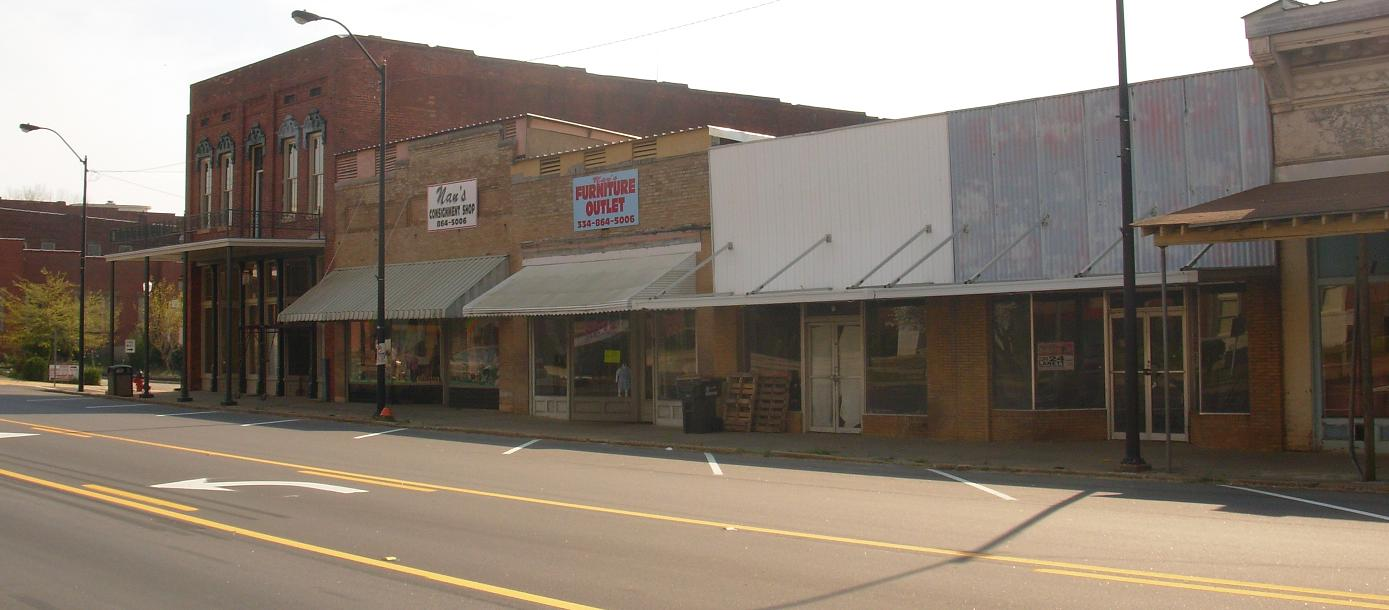
Downtown LaFayette, Alabama

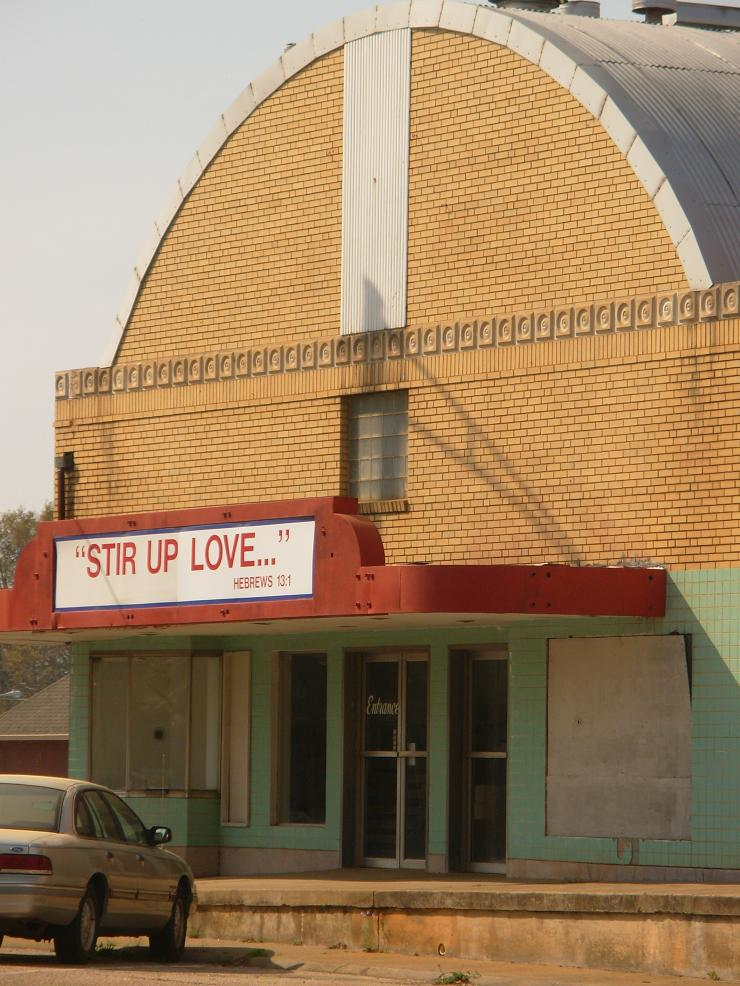
An old theatre in Downtown LaFayette most recently served as a church.

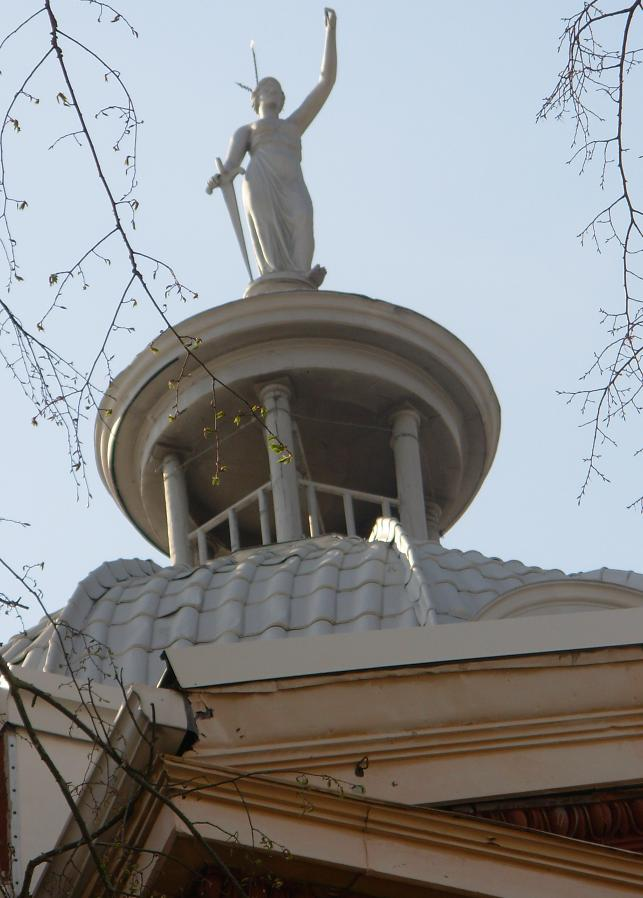
Statue of Lady Justice which tops the courthouse

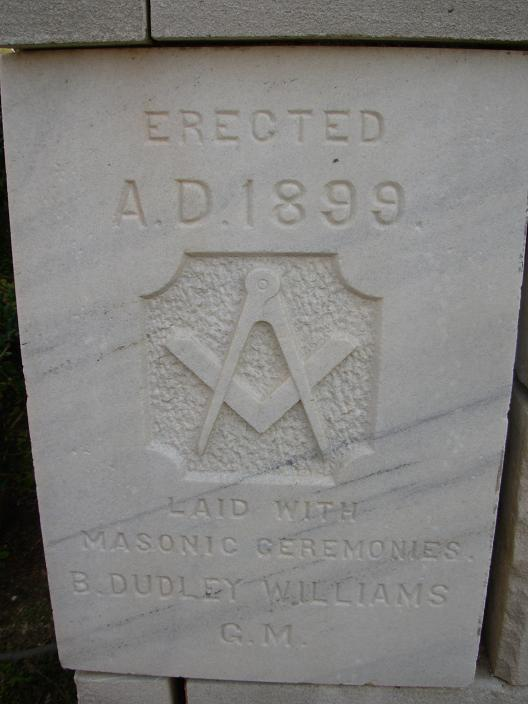
The cornerstone of the courthouse, laid by Masons in 1899.

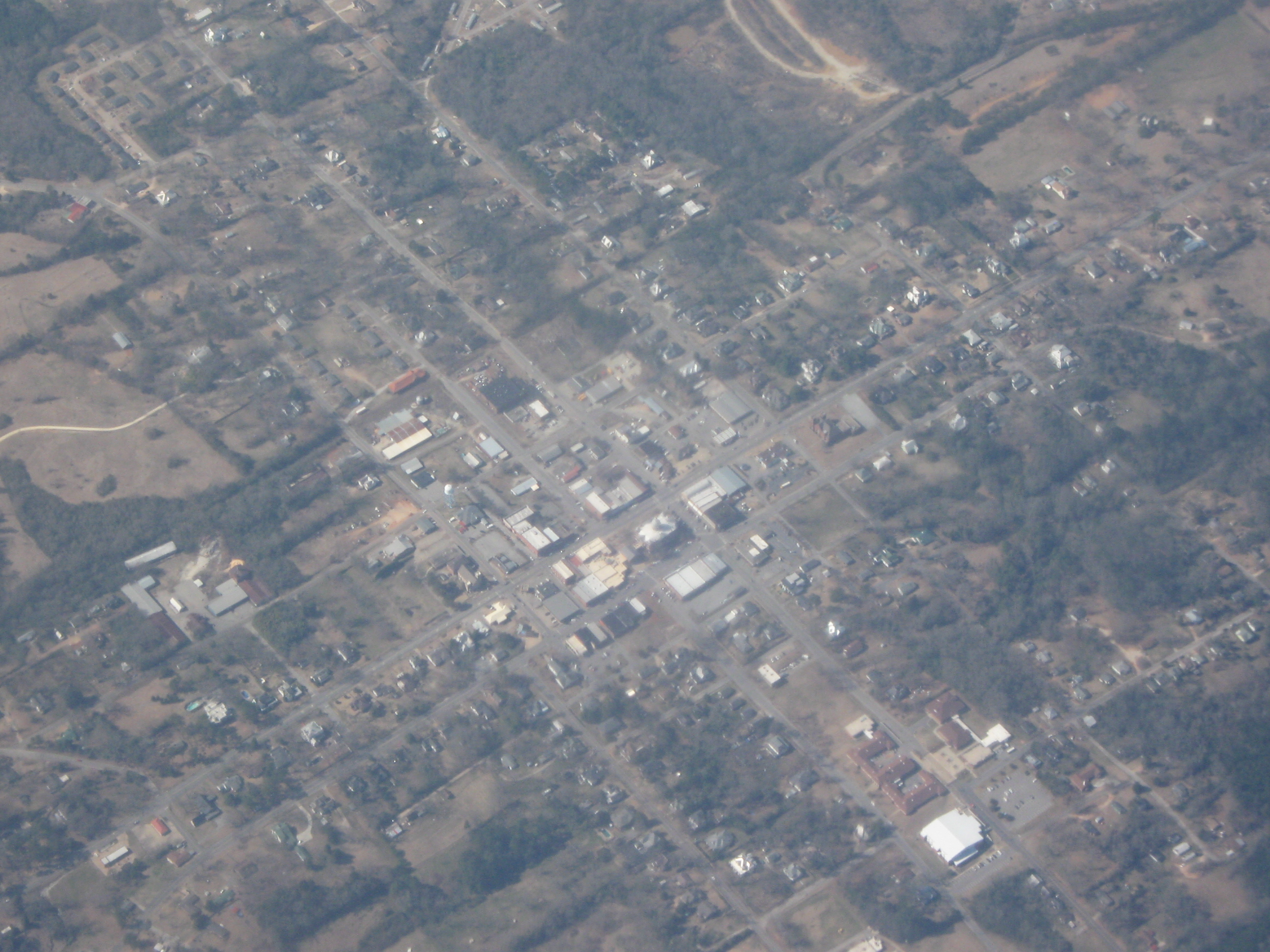
Aerial photograph of downtown LaFayette (note courthouse at center of photograph)
