= Stroud, Alabama =

- Unincorporated community
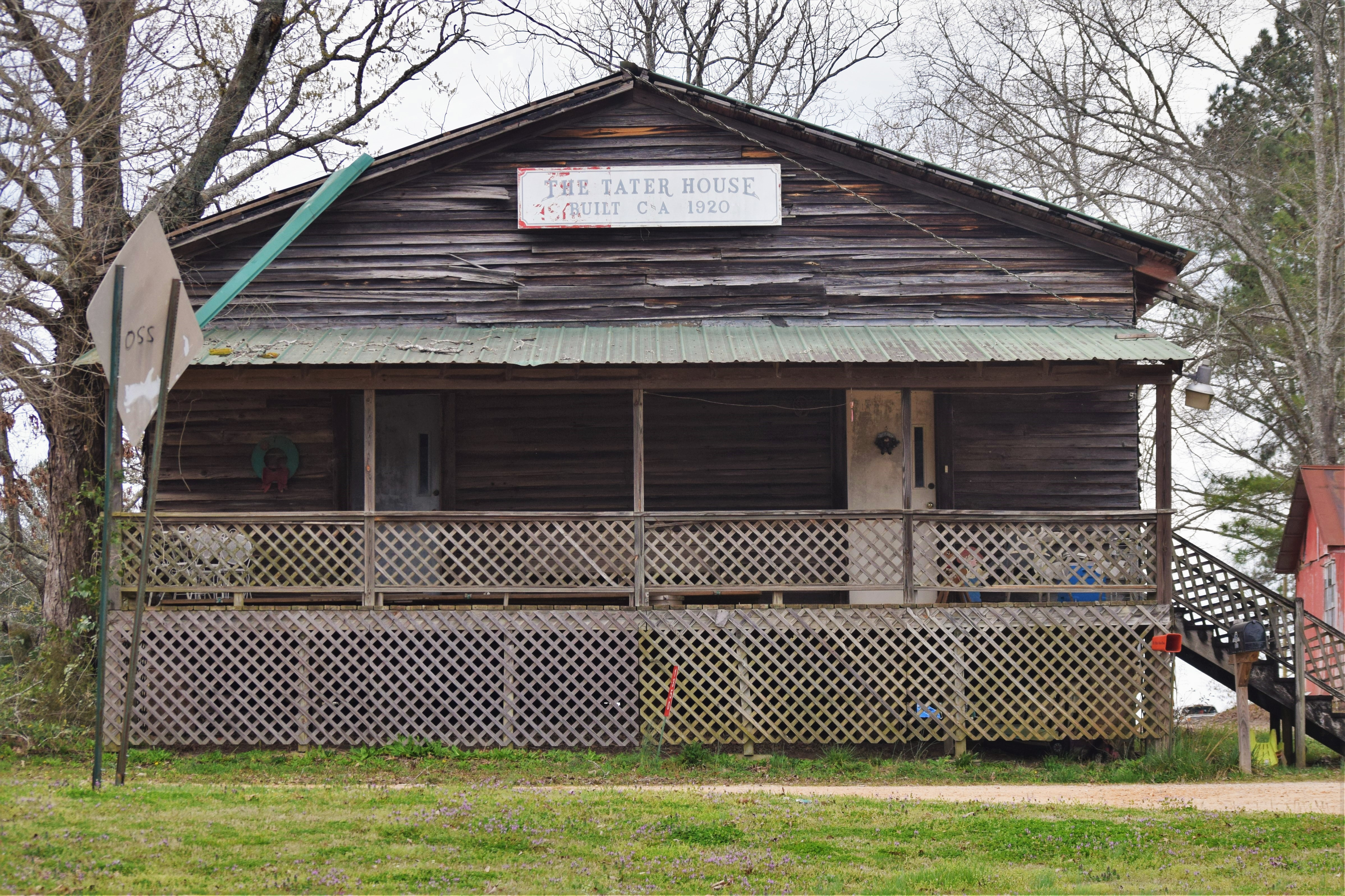
- Stroud's "Tater House" was built circa 1920 and is located along U.S. Highway 431.

- Location within Alabama Location within the United States
- Coordinates: 33°03′17″N 85°19′51″W
- Country: United States
- State: Alabama
- County: Chambers
- Elevation: 846 ft (258 m)
- Time zone: UTC-6 (Central (CST))
  - Summer (DST): UTC-5 (CDT)
- Area code: 334
- GNIS feature ID: 127474

Stroud is an unincorporated community in Chambers County, Alabama, United States, located along U.S. Route 431. Stroud was home to James Wyly Grady, who served in the Alabama Legislature. A post office operated under the name Stroud from 1882 to 1957.

== Demographics ==
Historical population
Census	Pop.	Note	%±
1890	285		—
1920	442		—
1930	396		−10.4%
1940	125		−68.4%
1950	79		−36.8%
U.S. Decennial Census
