= Chambers County School District =

School district in Alabama, United States

Address
- 1298 Vocational Drive Lafayette, Alabama, 36862; United States

District information
- Type: Public
- Grades: PreK–12
- NCES District ID: 0100600

Students and staff
- Students: 3,386
- Teachers: 202.09
- Staff: 196.72
- Student–teacher ratio: 16.75

Other information
- Website: www.chambersk12.org

Chambers County School District is a school district in Chambers County, Alabama.

== Schools ==
=== High School ===
- LaFayette High School
- Valley High School

=== 7-12 ===
- Inspire Academy

=== Middle School ===
- W.F. Burns Middle School

=== Elementary ===
- Bob Harding-Shawmut Elementary School
- Eastside John P. Powell Magnet School
- Fairfax Elementary School
- Huguley Elementary School
