= List of United States tornadoes from January to February 2023 =

United States tornadoes from January to February 2023
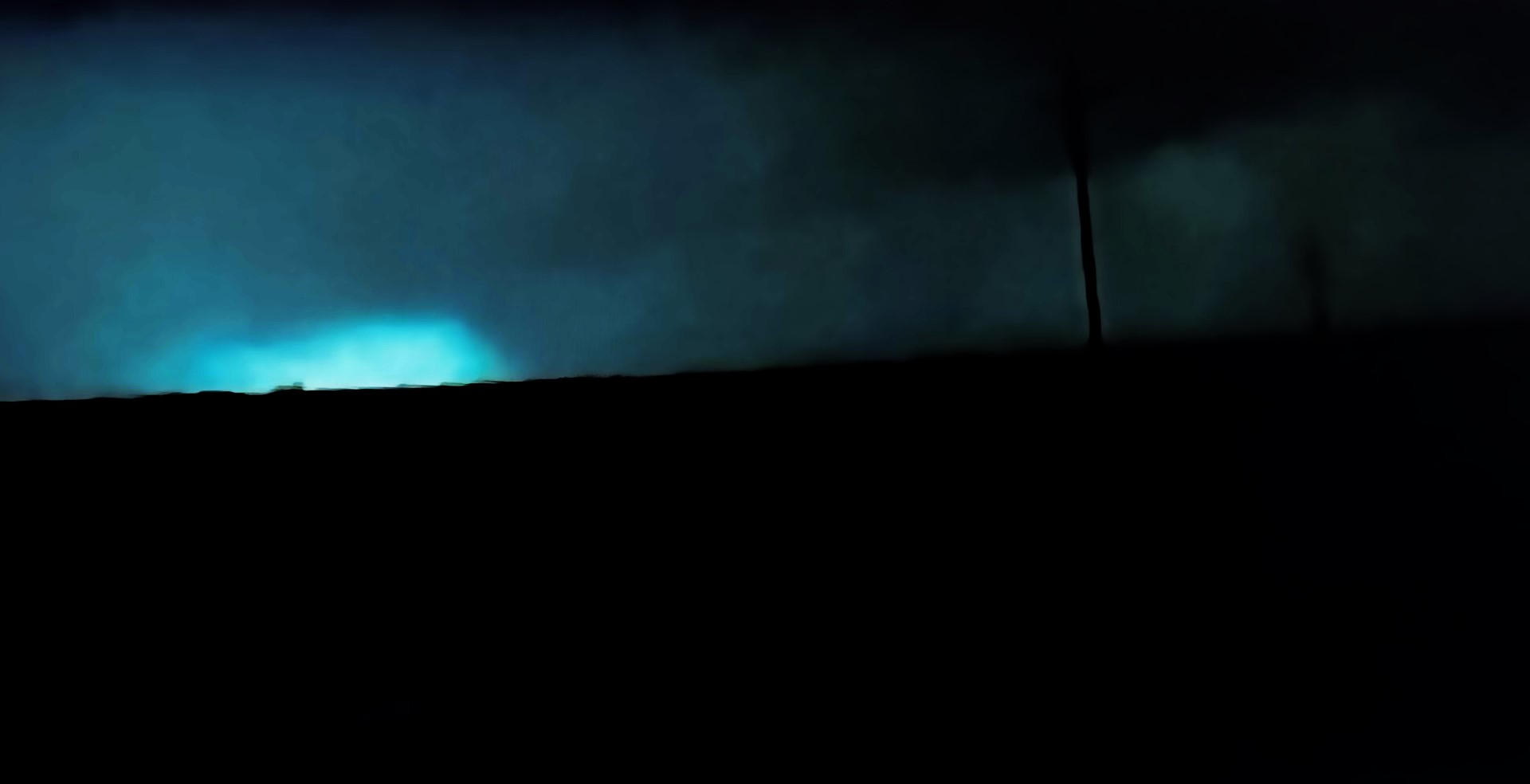
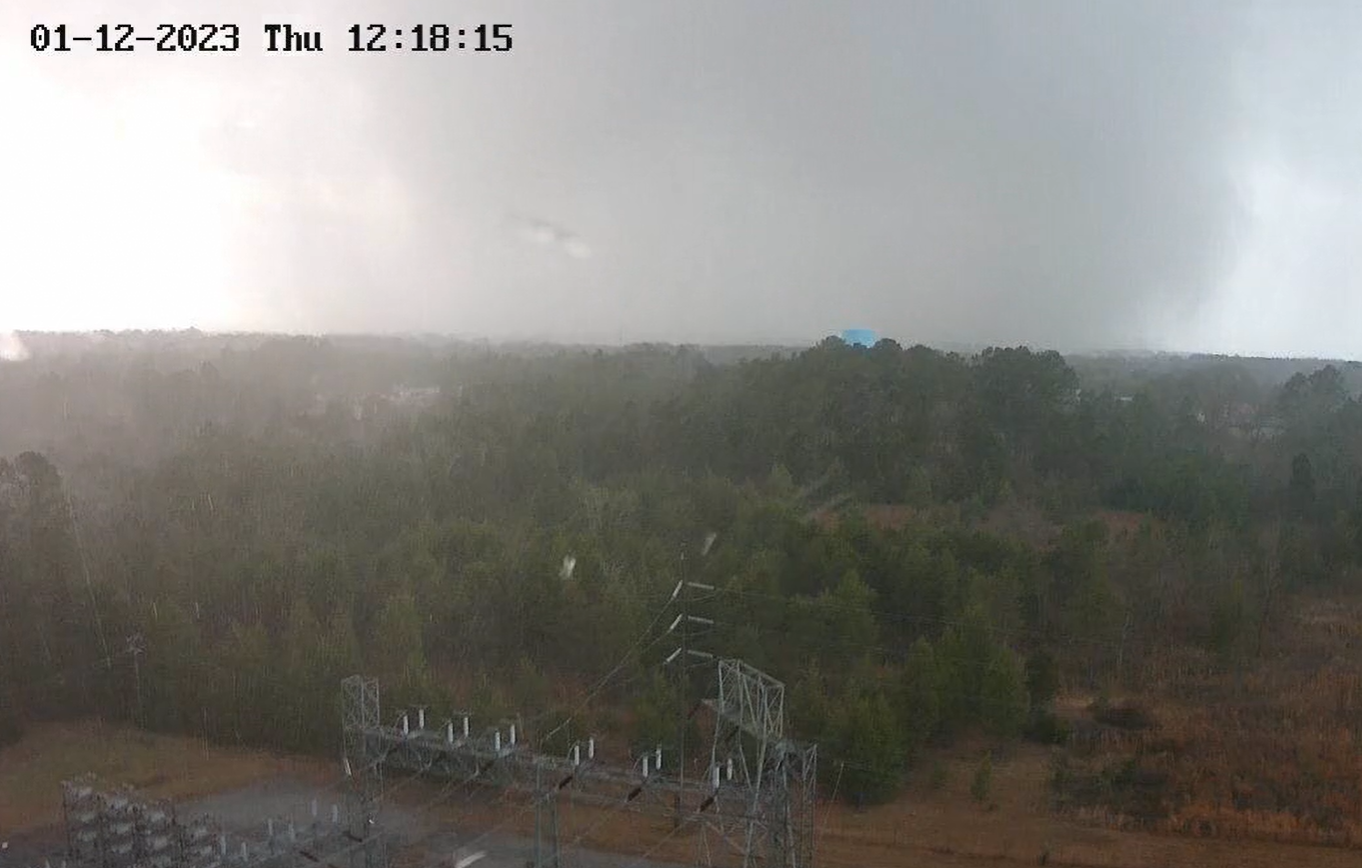
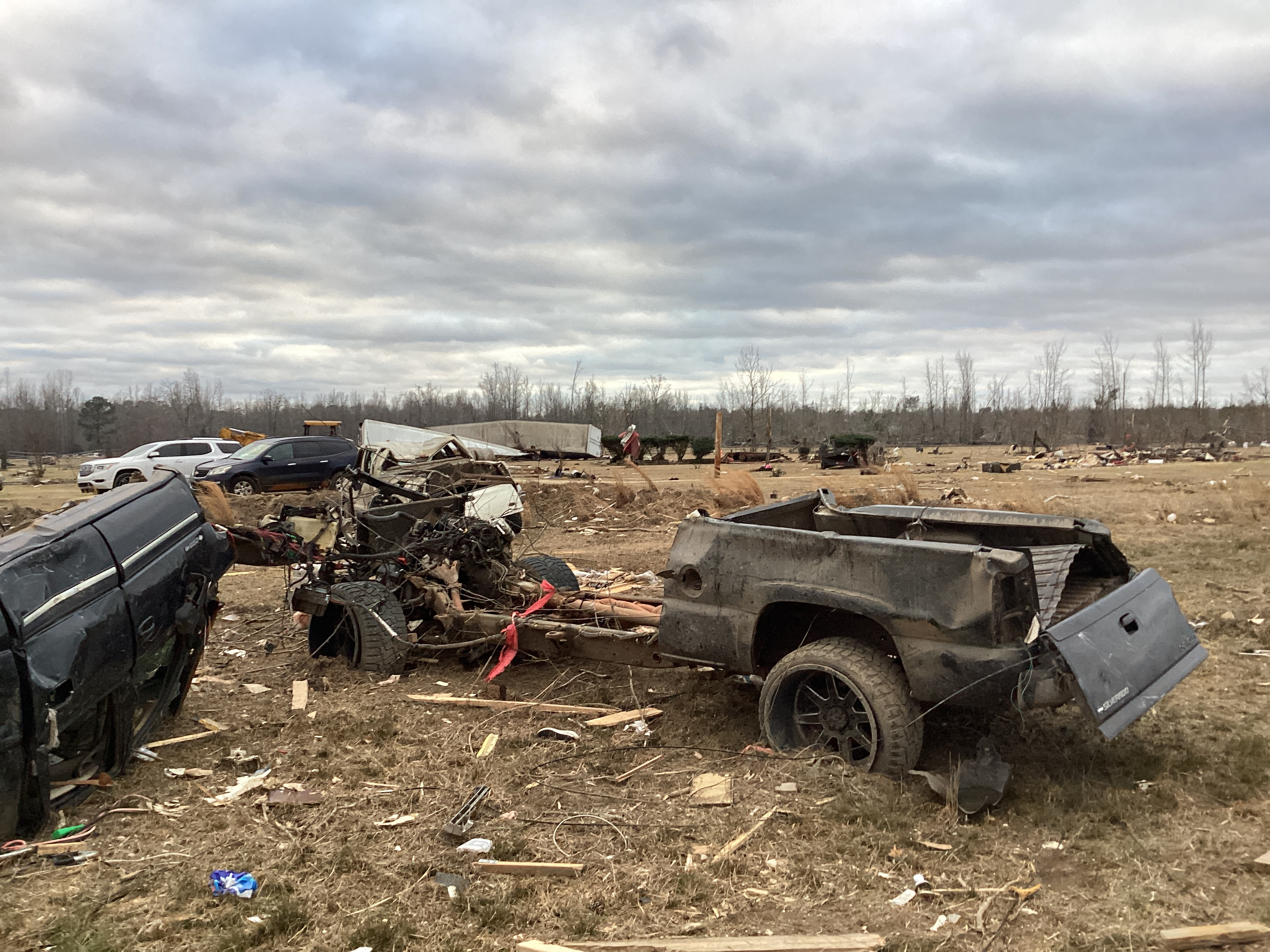
- Clockwise from top: An EF2 tornado near Cheyenne, Oklahoma on February 26; Vehicle damage in Old Kingston, Alabama after a deadly EF3 tornado on January 12; an EF2 tornado in Selma, Alabama on January 12
- Timespan: January 2 – February 27
- Maximum rated tornado: EF3 tornado: Old Kingston, Alabama on January 12; Griffin, Georgia on January 12; Deer Park, Texas on January 23
- Tornadoes: 186
- Fatalities: 9
- Injuries: 89

This page documents all tornadoes confirmed by various weather forecast offices of the National Weather Service in the United States for January and February 2023. Based on the 1991–2020 average, about 39 tornadoes are typically recorded across the United States during January and about 36 tornadoes are recorded in February. These tornadoes are commonly focused across the Southern United States due to their proximity to the unstable airmass and warm waters of the Gulf of Mexico, as well as California in association with winter storms.

In January 2023, 130 tornadoes were confirmed across the United States, the third highest count on record in that month behind 1999 and 2017. It likewise featured the third most tornado watches on record, at 25. A total of 793 severe weather reports were received by the Storm Prediction Center, which is more than double the 10-year average of 348 reports. Five days featured a level 3/Enhanced risk of severe weather, the most in a January since the implementation of that risk category in 2014. Well above average activity was likely enhanced by the ongoing La Niña. Although the brunt of the tornadic activity was concentrated across the Southern United States, particularly in Alabama which saw its highest number of January tornadoes on record, Iowa saw its first January tornadoes since 1967, and Illinois recorded its highest number of January tornadoes in a single day in 34 years.

February did not see as many tornadoes, but was still above average with 56 tornadoes, making it the 10th most of active February on record. Most of the tornadoes touched down in a moderate outbreak at the end of the month; the outbreak produced 12 tornadoes in Oklahoma, setting the record for the most tornadoes ever recorded in Oklahoma during the month.

== January ==
Confirmed tornadoes by Enhanced Fujita rating
EFU	EF0	EF1	EF2	EF3	EF4	EF5	Total
8	41	58	20	3	0	0	130

=== January 2 event ===
List of confirmed tornadoes – Monday, January 2, 2023 (Note: All dates are based on the local time zone where the tornado touched down; however, all times are in Coordinated Universal Time for consistency.)
EF#	Location	County / Parish	State	Start Coord.	Time (UTC)	Path length	Max width
EF1	SW of Norphlet	Union	AR	33.2939°N 92.7057°W	17:47–17:48	0.24 mi (0.39 km)	350 yd (320 m)
EF1	A brief tornado destroyed an outbuilding, damaged a home, and snapped some trees.						
EF1	Jessieville	Garland	AR	34.694°N 93.0673°W	20:38–20:41	2.09 mi (3.36 km)	200 yd (180 m)
EF1	This tornado began just to the southwest of Jessieville, causing tree damage near an Arkansas Forestry Commission building. The tornado then moved northeast into Jessieville and damaged a few homes in town. Most notably, damage was inflicted to multiple buildings on the campus of Jessieville High School and several metal light poles at the football field were bent over. The tornado continued to move northeast, damaging a pole barn just north of town before dissipating. Two people were injured by the tornado at the high school.						
EF1	E of Pleasant Hill	Sabine	LA	31.7499°N 93.4807°W	21:11–21:19	5.2 mi (8.4 km)	70 yd (64 m)
EF1	Metal panels were ripped from a home, a swing set was flipped, and several trees were uprooted or snapped. A small metal outbuilding was damaged as well.						
EF0	ENE of Edgefield	Red River	LA	32.0582°N 93.2735°W	21:43–21:44	0.31 mi (0.50 km)	50 yd (46 m)
EF0	Large tree branches were downed and shingles were ripped from a gazebo. A metal covering was removed from the porch of a manufactured home and its metal skirting was damaged.						
EFU	SE of Shidler	Osage	OK	36.7218°N 96.6194°W	22:37–22:38	0.1 mi (0.16 km)	100 yd (91 m)
EFU	A brief tornado occurred in an open field. No damage occurred.						
EF2	S of Jonesboro to E of Quitman	Jackson	LA	32.172°N 92.7048°W	22:46–23:09	14.76 mi (23.75 km)	1,928 yd (1,763 m)
EF2	This large and strong tornado was over a mile wide at times. It touched down south of Jonesboro and moved through areas east of town where many trees were downed. Two mobile homes were pushed off their foundations, one of which was rolled over and was largely destroyed. A house had part of its metal roof blown off, a power pole was downed, and a few other mobile homes and a chicken house also sustained damage to their roofs. Continuing to the north-northeast, the tornado reached its peak intensity just southeast of the Beech Springs community. Numerous large trees were snapped. A brick home had much of its roof torn off and the walls of the garage collapsed. Another brick house and a manufactured home had a significant amount of roofing torn off and a few other residences had more minor damage, including a destroyed carport. Several outbuildings were also damaged or destroyed. The tornado weakened and caused additional minor tree and roof damage near Quitman before dissipating. Three people were injured.						
EF0	NNE of Pryor	Mayes	OK	36.346°N 95.298°W	23:32–23:43	5.3 mi (8.5 km)	700 yd (640 m)
EF0	This high-end EF0 tornado destroyed an outbuilding and damaged two others shortly after it touched down. The tornado then moved over the Oklahoma Mesonet Pryor station, which measured an 81 mph (130 km/h) wind gust. The tornado continued moving northeast where a house sustained roof and siding damage before it dissipated.						
EF1	Texanna	McIntosh	OK	35.32°N 95.474°W	23:52–00:05	8.6 mi (13.8 km)	650 yd (590 m)
EF1	Trees and tree limbs were downed in and around Texanna and a few homes sustained roof and window damage. Storage buildings and outbuildings were damaged or destroyed.						
EF2	NW of Sterlington to SE of Marion	Union	LA	32.784°N 92.1695°W	00:19–00:25	3.94 mi (6.34 km)	900 yd (820 m)
EF2	A strong tornado knocked down several metal truss electrical transmission towers, destroyed an outbuilding, and snapped or uprooted dozens of trees.						
EF1	SSW of Fairland	Ottawa	OK	36.706°N 94.874°W	00:23–00:25	0.6 mi (0.97 km)	200 yd (180 m)
EF1	Several outbuildings were damaged or destroyed and large tree limbs were snapped.						
EF1	N of Bastrop	Morehouse	LA	32.8681°N 91.8982°W	00:36–00:37	1.43 mi (2.30 km)	75 yd (69 m)
EF1	Some trees were snapped along the path of this tornado.						
EF1	WNW of Bonita	Morehouse	LA	32.9539°N 91.8686°W	00:40–00:49	3.95 mi (6.36 km)	200 yd (180 m)
EF1	Numerous trees, some farm outbuildings, and a few residences were damaged. Metal roofing panels were removed from a gas production facility.						
EF2	W of Wilmot to Montrose to SE of Halley	Ashley, Chicot, Desha	AR	33.0416°N 91.7697°W	00:54–01:45	42.77 mi (68.83 km)	1,300 yd (1,200 m)
EF2	This large, strong, and long-tracked tornado first touched down to the west of Wilmot before moving to the northeast, snapping or uprooting numerous trees and downing tree limbs. A few outbuildings were damaged or destroyed west of Portland before the tornado reached its peak intensity and struck the town of Montrose, where a small guest home on concrete blocks was pushed off its foundation and destroyed. A nearby mobile home was destroyed when it was rolled across three parked cars, which were also destroyed. Several sheds and outbuildings were demolished and numerous homes in town suffered roof damage; a few of which had a considerable amount of roofing removed. One older home had an exterior wall torn off as well. Elsewhere along the path, a center pivot irrigation system was destroyed, power poles were downed, and a home and several outbuildings lost roofing and paneling. Hundreds of trees were uprooted, snapped, or damaged along the path.						
EFU	NNE of Tamaha	Sequoyah	OK	35.4105°N 94.9746°W	01:25–01:30	2.5 mi (4.0 km)	200 yd (180 m)
EFU	A tornado was observed moving over the Robert S. Kerr Reservoir along the Arkansas River. No damage was found.						
EF0	W of Kilbourne, LA	West Carroll (LA), Chicot (AR)	LA, AR	32.9621°N 91.4023°W	03:02–03:08	3.81 mi (6.13 km)	250 yd (230 m)
EF0	One shed was destroyed and several others were damaged or tossed. A few homes sustained minor roof damage, a barn was collapsed, and a trampoline was tossed. A few trees were snapped and several tree limbs were downed as well.						

=== January 3 event ===
List of confirmed tornadoes – Tuesday, January 3, 2023
EF#	Location	County / Parish	State	Start Coord.	Time (UTC)	Path length	Max width
EF0	Southern Brownsville	Haywood	TN	35.545°N 89.287°W	08:24–08:27	2.39 mi (3.85 km)	100 yd (91 m)
EF0	Trees and the roof of a home suffered minor damage.						
EF0	Southwestern Hopkinsville	Christian	KY	36.837°N 87.5283°W	10:35–10:36	1.21 mi (1.95 km)	50 yd (46 m)
EF0	A high-end EF0 tornado tore the roof off of a cinder block garage attached to a home. The home itself had a small portion of its roof removed. A large carport at another residence was lifted and tossed 25 yards (23 m). Numerous tree limbs were downed in residential areas.						
EF0	E of Olive Branch	DeSoto	MS	34.9561°N 89.7784°W	12:05–12:07	1.36 mi (2.19 km)	100 yd (91 m)
EF0	A brief tornado damaged gutters and shingles on homes near Olive Branch. Some minor tree damage also occurred.						
EF1	ENE of Etta	Union	MS	34.4851°N 89.2079°W	15:07–15:10	1.86 mi (2.99 km)	150 yd (140 m)
EF1	Numerous tree branches were snapped in and around Etta and a few trees were uprooted. Several homes also sustained roof damage.						
EF1	WNW of Russellville	Franklin	AL	34.5382°N 87.8899°W	16:48–16:50	0.6 mi (0.97 km)	70 yd (64 m)
EF1	Several farm outbuildings were damaged and trees were snapped or uprooted.						
EF1	SSE of Demopolis to NW of Faunsdale	Marengo, Hale	AL	32.4151°N 87.7827°W	17:21–17:33	8.84 mi (14.23 km)	275 yd (251 m)
EF1	A low-end EF1 tornado snapped, damaged, or uprooted numerous trees along its path. Metal roof panels were torn from outbuildings and lofted into trees. Some tree limbs were downed in Prairieville before the tornado dissipated.						
EF1	NNW of Marion	Perry	AL	32.6835°N 87.3491°W	18:10–18:11	0.15 mi (0.24 km)	100 yd (91 m)
EF1	A manufactured home was shifted off its foundation and had a large amount of its roofing material ripped off as a result of this brief tornado. Metal panels were tossed into nearby trees and additional trees were snapped or uprooted.						
EF0	SE of Centreville	Bibb	AL	32.8493°N 87.0548°W	18:41–18:45	2.82 mi (4.54 km)	100 yd (91 m)
EF0	Several large trees were uprooted in the Talladega National Forest.						
EF0	NW of Prattville	Autauga	AL	32.5609°N 86.5972°W	19:18–19:26	3.18 mi (5.12 km)	60 yd (55 m)
EF0	A few manufactured homes sustained damage, one of which had a porch torn off. Damage to fascia and metal panels occurred as well and a metal carport structure was thrown downwind. Tree branches were broken as well.						
EF1	SE of Shelby	Chilton, Coosa	AL	32.988°N 86.5264°W	19:39–19:43	2.46 mi (3.96 km)	250 yd (230 m)
EF1	Several dozen trees were snapped or uprooted. Several homes and boat houses sustained roof and siding damage.						
EF2	N of Deatsville to Jordan Lake	Elmore	AL	32.6239°N 86.4098°W	19:42–19:59	9.06 mi (14.58 km)	800 yd (730 m)
EF2	A strong tornado snapped or uprooted numerous large trees along its path and some trees fell on residences. Dozens of homes sustained damage, including a few that suffered considerable roof damage, and one home that had most of its roof ripped off. Some houseboats at the Jordan Lake Reservoir along the Coosa River were destroyed and some outbuildings were damaged or destroyed as well.						
EF0	NE of Sylacauga to W of Ashland	Clay	AL	33.235°N 86.0693°W	20:31–20:45	6.41 mi (10.32 km)	300 yd (270 m)
EF0	This high-end EF0 tornado touched down on the eastern slopes of Horne Mountain in the Talladega National Forest, causing damage to trees, one of which fell onto a barn.						
EF0	NE of Lineville	Randolph	AL	33.3464°N 85.6469°W	21:17–21:19	1.11 mi (1.79 km)	150 yd (140 m)
EF0	Trees were damaged along the path.						
EF0	SW of Roanoke	Chambers	AL	33.0648°N 85.4433°W	21:27–21:37	4.4 mi (7.1 km)	500 yd (460 m)
EF0	The roof of a home and several trees were damaged by this tornado.						
EFU	NW of Illiopolis	Sangamon	IL	39.8744°N 89.2868°W	21:52–21:53	0.09 mi (0.14 km)	10 yd (9.1 m)
EFU	A trained storm spotter reported a brief tornado; it caused no damage.						
EF0	Eastern Newnan	Coweta	GA	33.3844°N 84.7192°W	21:42–21:44	0.62 mi (1.00 km)	150 yd (140 m)
EF0	Homes in the eastern part of town suffered minor roof and structural damage and trees were snapped or uprooted.						
EFU	SW of Latham	Logan	IL	39.9435°N 89.2047°W	22:05–22:06	0.03 mi (0.048 km)	10 yd (9.1 m)
EFU	A trained storm spotter reported a brief tornado; it caused no damage.						
EF0	Stonecrest	DeKalb	GA	33.6830°N 84.14°W	22:25–22:26	0.25 mi (0.40 km)	100 yd (91 m)
EF0	A brief high-end EF0 tornado snapped or uprooted dozens of trees and inflicted minor roof and siding damage to several homes.						
EF0	SW of Maroa	Macon	IL	40.0109°N 89.0144°W	22:33–22:34	0.32 mi (0.51 km)	25 yd (23 m)
EF0	A power pole and an irrigation unit were damaged.						
EF1	NW of Maroa	Macon	IL	40.0373°N 88.9714°W	22:35–22:38	0.88 mi (1.42 km)	75 yd (69 m)
EF1	A high-end EF1 tornado demolished a barn, with its remnants tossed into a grain bin, and destroyed a fence.						
EFU	ENE of Mount Auburn	Christian	IL	39.7852°N 89.196°W	23:05–23:06	0.14 mi (0.23 km)	10 yd (9.1 m)
EFU	Law enforcement reported a brief tornado; it caused no damage.						
EF1	SE of Bellflower	McLean	IL	40.32°N 88.481°W	23:38–23:42	0.45 mi (0.72 km)	25 yd (23 m)
EF1	A high-end EF1 tornado destroyed a farm outbuilding with the resulting debris being carried over 0.25 miles (0.40 km) away. The east-facing side of the house on the farm was splattered with dirt and grass as well.						
EF1	SE of Gibson City	Ford	IL	40.422°N 88.367°W	23:56–00:02	2.9 mi (4.7 km)	25 yd (23 m)
EF1	An outbuilding was completely destroyed while other outbuildings and homes were damaged.						
EF1	Decatur	Macon	IL	39.8643°N 88.9289°W	00:00–00:01	0.21 mi (0.34 km)	25 yd (23 m)
EF1	A vacant bowling alley building had several of its wall panels blown out and debris was scattered across a road as a result of this brief low-end EF1 tornado.						
EF0	Northeastern Decatur	Macon	IL	39.8822°N 88.8946°W	00:05–00:08	1.12 mi (1.80 km)	20 yd (18 m)
EF0	A brief tornado struck the southern and eastern parts of Richland Community College, damaging trees and fences and moving multiple car parts around. Additionally, insulation and debris from the abandoned bowling alley that was damaged by the previous tornado was found in a tree and out in some fields to the east of the campus. This was the ninth and final tornado to occur in Illinois on January 3, the highest number of January tornadoes in the state in 34 years.						
EF1	NNE of Laurel to SW of Sandersville	Jones	MS	31.7617°N 89.1008°W	04:47–04:52	2.61 mi (4.20 km)	365 yd (334 m)
EF1	Multiple trees were snapped or uprooted. A home suffered minor roof damage and a cyclone fence was knocked down. The tornado dissipated after crossing Tallahala Creek.						

=== January 4 event ===
List of confirmed tornadoes – Wednesday, January 4, 2023
EF#	Location	County / Parish	State	Start Coord.	Time (UTC)	Path length	Max width
EF1	SE of Alexander City	Tallapoosa	AL	32.8837°N 85.9362°W	08:59–09:04	3.77 mi (6.07 km)	125 yd (114 m)
EF1	A cement mixing plant sustained significant roof damage and trees were damaged by this low-end EF1 tornado.						
EF1	Eastern Montgomery	Montgomery	AL	32.3467°N 86.1964°W	09:00–09:05	1.87 mi (3.01 km)	130 yd (120 m)
EF1	A high-end EF1 tornado touched down in the eastern part of Montgomery. Numerous homes sustained roof damage and one home had much of its roofing torn off. Vehicles were flipped, a garage was destroyed, and trees were damaged. Damage to sheds and carports also occurred and an assisted living facility sustained minor damage. Fencing and a scoreboard was knocked over at a baseball field as well. One person was seriously injured.						
EF0	SSE of Shorter	Macon	AL	32.384°N 85.9258°W	09:23–09:25	0.67 mi (1.08 km)	75 yd (69 m)
EF0	A brief tornado caused minor damage to trees, outbuildings, and fascia. A couple of basketball hoops were knocked over as well.						
EF1	Roosterville	Heard	GA	33.4071°N 85.1896°W	10:02–10:05	2.45 mi (3.94 km)	100 yd (91 m)
EF1	A manufactured home was pushed off its foundation and destroyed, numerous trees were twisted or snapped, and a barn was demolished.						
EF0	Society Hill	Macon	AL	32.4249°N 85.4533°W	10:07–10:09	1.11 mi (1.79 km)	100 yd (91 m)
EF0	A cotton gin on a farm was destroyed while trees and a roadside sign were damaged. One tree was uprooted and fell onto a mobile home.						
EF1	Northern Sandersville	Washington	GA	32.9970°N 82.8450°W	13:48–13:54	3.8 mi (6.1 km)	400 yd (370 m)
EF1	This tornado moved through the north side of Sandersville, where a metal warehouse building sustained broken windows, had portions of its roof pulled back, and had its sliding metal doors blown out. Cars in a nearby parking lot were also damaged and a semi-truck near the building was flipped over, minorly injuring the driver. Elsewhere along the path, homes sustained roof damage and a double-wide manufactured home had its awning removed. Many trees were downed as well, one of which destroyed a shed while others landed on houses, including one tree that fell on and destroyed a second story bedroom.						
EF0	NNW of Louisville	Jefferson	GA	33.09°N 82.49°W	14:12–14:18	5.2 mi (8.4 km)	500 yd (460 m)
EF0	A weak tornado caused minor damage to a couple of metal warehouse buildings, a sign, and Jefferson County High School. A pivot irrigation system was flipped over and some trees were downed. Rear flank downdraft winds from the tornado inflicted moderate damage to a softball field facility, while also destroying a shed, several signs and scoreboards, and the fencing around the field.						
EF0	SSW of Wagener to W of Perry	Aiken	SC	33.6098°N 81.3907°W	15:27–15:30	3.49 mi (5.62 km)	75 yd (69 m)
EF0	A dock outbuilding was destroyed and multiple pine trees were snapped or uprooted.						
EF0	SE of Gilbert	Lexington	SC	33.8859°N 81.3356°W	15:30–15:32	1.43 mi (2.30 km)	50 yd (46 m)
EF0	Multiple trees were snapped or uprooted and some power lines were downed.						
EF1	N of Woodford	Lexington, Orangeburg	SC	33.6653°N 81.1892°W	15:40–15:50	6.62 mi (10.65 km)	50 yd (46 m)
EF1	This tornado passed north of Woodford, snapping or uprooting numerous trees.						
EF0	SW of South Congaree	Lexington	SC	33.8849°N 81.2369°W	15:42–15:51	4.58 mi (7.37 km)	50 yd (46 m)
EF0	An intermittent tornado sporadically snapped and uprooted trees along its path.						
EF0	W of St. Matthews	Calhoun	SC	33.7079°N 80.9301°W	16:02–16:03	0.12 mi (0.19 km)	25 yd (23 m)
EF0	Several pine trees were snapped or uprooted by this brief, weak tornado.						
EF0	SE of Magnolia	Clinch	GA	30.812°N 82.6477°W	17:35–17:36	0.64 mi (1.03 km)	300 yd (270 m)
EF0	Several pine trees were downed or snapped, a manufactured outhouse was destroyed, a service station canopy was damaged, an RV was flipped over and moved 15–20 feet (4.6–6.1 m), and a single-wide hunting RV lost part of its tin roof as a result of this high-end EF0 tornado.						
EF1	SW of Bristol	Pierce	GA	31.4074°N 82.2806°W	18:09–18:12	3.16 mi (5.09 km)	200 yd (180 m)
EF1	A small water tank was knocked down and a farm outbuilding was heavily damaged. Many trees were snapped or uprooted as well.						
EF0	NNE of Homeland	Charlton	GA	30.9851°N 81.9586°W	18:40–18:41	0.18 mi (0.29 km)	50 yd (46 m)
EF0	A large tree was downed by this brief tornado.						
EF0	SE of Little Texas	Southampton	VA	36.59°N 77.32°W	19:39–19:42	2.16 mi (3.48 km)	50 yd (46 m)
EF0	A weak tornado embedded within a larger area of damaging straight-line winds damaged a small silo, the siding of a home, and trees.						
EF1	Bayview	Beaufort	NC	35.4378°N 76.7974°W	19:49–19:50	0.33 mi (0.53 km)	125 yd (114 m)
EF1	A waterspout moved ashore in Bayview, snapping several large trees at a golf club. A large shed also had its tin roof ripped off and thrown about 25 yards (23 m). Shingles were also torn from the roofs of several nearby homes.						

=== January 10 event ===
List of confirmed tornadoes – Tuesday, January 10, 2023
EF#	Location	County / Parish	State	Start Coord.	Time (UTC)	Path length	Max width
EF1	SE of Rancho Calaveras	Calaveras	CA	38.0834°N 120.7581°W	12:10–12:15	0.39 mi (0.63 km)	40 yd (37 m)
EF1	A brief low-end EF1 tornado caused extensive damage to softwood and hardwood trees. This is the first tornado recorded in Calaveras County since 1980.						

=== January 12 event ===
List of confirmed tornadoes – Thursday, January 12, 2023 (Note: All dates are based on the local time zone where the tornado touched down; however, all times are in Coordinated Universal Time for consistency.)
EF#	Location	County / Parish	State	Start Coord.	Time (UTC)	Path length	Max width
EF1	SE of Monkey's Eyebrow, KY to W of Joppa, IL	Ballard (KY), McCracken (KY), Massac (IL)	KY, IL	37.18°N 88.99°W	08:03–08:10	6.5 mi (10.5 km)	200 yd (180 m)
EF1	Pieces of roofing and siding were ripped from a few homes and multiple metal roof panels were blown off two large barns by this low-end EF1 tornado. A church sustained damage to its fencing and the top half of a clay tile silo was destroyed.						
EF1	S of Muldon	Monroe	MS	33.7182°N 88.6716°W	12:29–12:33	2.44 mi (3.93 km)	50 yd (46 m)
EF1	A home sustained loss of its porch and had several windows broken. The garage door and a substantial portion of the roof was also removed. An adjacent large workshop was demolished, another outbuilding was damaged, and two power poles were snapped. Trees were downed as well.						
EF1	Northern Pleasureville	Henry	KY	38.3529°N 85.1327°W	13:47–13:49	1.27 mi (2.04 km)	100 yd (91 m)
EF1	A brief high-end EF1 tornado significantly damaged or destroyed several barns and outbuildings near Pleasureville with debris speared into the ground. In the northern part town, some homes sustained considerable roof damage, one of which also sustained damage to a brick façade exterior wall. Open-air garages and carports were destroyed and one carport was thrown 50 yards (46 m) into trees. Two mobile homes were damaged and one was also moved from its concrete foundation blocks. Power lines were damaged and trees were snapped or uprooted, a few of which landed on homes in town.						
EF1	Northern Harrodsburg	Mercer	KY	37.77°N 84.91°W	14:01–14:05	3.6 mi (5.8 km)	80 yd (73 m)
EF1	One barn was demolished with its roofing material thrown 200 yards (180 m) away, while a second barn sustained significant roof and side panel damage. Two homes also sustained significant roof and gutter damage, with pieces of roofing were impaled into the ground. The tornado moved into the north side of Harrodsburg before dissipating, where two bleachers were flipped at Kenneth D. King Middle School and a power pole was damaged. Numerous trees were snapped, toppled, or twisted along the path as well.						
EF2	E of Delmar to N of Double Springs	Winston	AL	34.1658°N 87.5864°W	14:05–14:18	9.18 mi (14.77 km)	425 yd (389 m)
EF2	A strong tornado destroyed two large chicken coops and three other small buildings at a farm. Five homes were damaged, a detached garage was destroyed, an RV was overturned, and hundreds of trees were downed.						
EF1	SW of Moulton to Northern Decatur to NNW of Mooresville	Lawrence, Morgan, Limestone	AL	34.4494°N 87.3637°W	14:09–14:45	30.32 mi (48.80 km)	325 yd (297 m)
EF1	This weak but long-tracked tornado began over a ridge to the southwest of Moulton, snapping or uprooting numerous trees. A few homes sustained roof damage and one had an associated large metal workshop almost completely destroyed. As the tornado moved directly through Moulton, relatively minor damage occurred at the high school baseball fields and roofing was blown off of Lawrence Medical Center. Tree and roof damage occurred elsewhere in town as well and a motel had much of its sheet metal roofing removed. The tornado caused intermittent minor tree damage as it continued to the northeast into Morgan County, passing south of Trinity. It then moved through the north edge of Decatur, damaging a law enforcement marina, power lines, and several mobile homes at the Kimberly Pines mobile home park. Several large campers were flipped or displaced, trees and fences were downed, and a tractor-trailer was blown off the road along I-65. A couple of homes sustained minor roof damage in town and some metal shipping containers were knocked over. After crossing the Tennessee River, it caused additional damage to the campus of Calhoun Community College and its baseball complex before lifting. One person was injured.						
EF1	NE of Danville	Boyle	KY	37.6878°N 84.7367°W	14:10–14:11	0.84 mi (1.35 km)	125 yd (114 m)
EF1	A large, well-built garage sustained significant damage to its roof and side wall with debris thrown 150 yards (140 m) to the east and impaled into the ground. Another well-built barn lost several of its roof panels and many trees were snapped or uprooted. Widespread straight-line wind damage occurred on either side of the tornado.						
EF0	NW of Williamstown	Grant	KY	38.6581°N 84.5797°W	14:23–14:24	0.27 mi (0.43 km)	50 yd (46 m)
EF0	Several homes sustained roof damage as a result of this high-end EF0 tornado, one of which had a small part of its roof ripped off. A street sign was bent to the ground and several trees were downed. A metal warehouse building had part of its roof lifted and damaged and two door frames on opposite sides of the building were blown in.						
EF2	W of Emelle to S of Gainesville	Sumter	AL	32.7288°N 88.3463°W	15:24–15:40	12.87 mi (20.71 km)	440 yd (400 m)
EF2	This strong tornado touched down just west of Emelle before moving directly through the town. A mobile home and a grain bin were destroyed, homes and outbuildings suffered roof damage, and trees were snapped. Elsewhere along the path, an outbuilding and another mobile home were destroyed, a house had its roof torn off, and a few other homes had roof damage. Numerous trees were snapped or uprooted along the path and one person was injured.						
EF1	NE of Richmond	Madison	KY	37.7719°N 84.2458°W	15:42–15:45	1.2 mi (1.9 km)	80 yd (73 m)
EF1	A hay barn was severely damaged and a dog run and a chicken coop were damaged along with the roofs of several homes. A travel trailer was lifted and tossed over a car which resulted in the travel trailer being flipped on its side and rotated 90 degrees from its original orientation. A pipe and a piece of wood were speared into the ground and many trees were damaged as well.						
EF2	Western Eutaw to N of Stewart to SSE of Duncanville	Greene, Hale, Tuscaloosa, Bibb	AL	32.842°N 87.9158°W	15:54–16:43	39.02 mi (62.80 km)	675 yd (617 m)
EF2	This strong and long-tracked tornado formed from the same storm that spawned the EF2 Emelle tornado. It first touched down in Eutaw, where dozens of homes sustained roof damage, one of which had part of its roof torn off. A rooftop observation structure was taken off of another home and thrown across the street, a field house and some fencing was damaged at Robert Brown Middle School, and many trees were snapped or uprooted in town. The tornado continued east-northeast along the Black Warrior River and struck the small community of Oak Village, where a home sustained destruction of its roof, attached garage, and multiple walls. Other nearby homes were damaged to a lesser degree, outbuildings were destroyed, a dock was thrown, and many trees were snapped or uprooted. The tornado then weakened significantly, causing only intermittent minor tree damage as it passed near Stewart and over SR 69 before re-intensifying as it entered the Talladega National Forest, where numerous trees were downed. After crossing into Tuscaloosa County, the tornado rapidly intensified to its peak intensity of high-end EF2, where a large swath of trees was completely mowed down, with most trees near the center of the path being snapped near the base. The tornado then weakened as it approached and then crossed US 82. Additional tree damage was observed and two homes suffered minor structural damage before the tornado dissipated. The path of the tornado moved over the entire track of an EF1 tornado that struck the same area on November 29, 2022, as well as an EF3 tornado that passed through the Talladega National Forest on March 25, 2021.						
EF0	SSW of Decatur	Meigs	TN	35.4993°N 84.8038°W	16:50–16:51	0.57 mi (0.92 km)	150 yd (140 m)
EF0	A brief, weak tornado embedded within an area of damaging straight-line winds uprooted trees and inflicted roof damage to multiple homes. One person was injured.						
EF2	SSE of Forkland to S of Greensboro to SW of Marion	Hale, Perry	AL	32.6221°N 87.7543°W	16:47–17:15	21.9 mi (35.2 km)	500 yd (460 m)
EF2	This tornado first touched down near the Greene-Hale county line and moved northeastward through unpopulated areas, downing numerous trees. The most significant damage occurred as the tornado passed just south of Greensboro, where a house was unroofed, a single-wide mobile home was rolled and destroyed, numerous trees were snapped or uprooted, and a few other structures sustained less severe damage. Additional tree damage occurred farther along the path before the tornado dissipated.						
EF1	NNE of Heiberger to NNW of Lawley	Perry, Bibb	AL	32.8027°N 87.2421°W	17:30–17:51	17.34 mi (27.91 km)	500 yd (460 m)
EF1	After the previous tornado dissipated, the supercell produced this tornado soon after. It reached EF1 intensity as it snapped and uprooted trees along a ridge. As it neared SR 219 after crossing into Bibb County, it weakened before dissipating after it crossed US 82.						
EF2	NE of Orrville to Selma to SE of Burnsville	Dallas	AL	32.3173°N 87.2278°W	18:04–18:31	23.22 mi (37.37 km)	950 yd (870 m)
EF2	See article on this tornado – Two people were injured.						
EF0	SW of Dandridge	Jefferson	TN	35.9767°N 83.509°W	18:14–18:15	0.43 mi (0.69 km)	30 yd (27 m)
EF0	A brief, weak tornado caused minor tree damage.						
EF2	SSE of Citronelle to Movico	Mobile	AL	31.0196°N 88.203°W	18:15–18:33	11.41 mi (18.36 km)	200 yd (180 m)
EF2	This tornado moved through areas of dense forest near Citronelle, snapping or uprooting many large trees. The tornado struck the small town of Movico before dissipating, tossing and destroying two tied-down mobile homes and snapping several large trees in town.						
EF0	E of Baneberry	Jefferson	TN	36.0514°N 83.2732°W	18:26–18:28	1.11 mi (1.79 km)	100 yd (91 m)
EF0	Trees and power lines were downed.						
EF3	SE of Evergreen to Old Kingston to N of Equality to E of Penton	Autauga, Elmore, Coosa, Tallapoosa, Chambers	AL	32.5212°N 86.7312°W	18:40–20:08	82.31 mi (132.47 km)	1,500 yd (1,400 m)
EF3	7 deaths – See section on this tornado – 16 people were injured.						
EF0	E of Nymph	Conecuh	AL	31.3616°N 86.9346°W	19:54–19:55	0.94 mi (1.51 km)	100 yd (91 m)
EF0	Several trees were uprooted and several tree limbs were downed.						
EF2	SW of Five Points, AL to NW of LaGrange, GA	Chambers (AL), Troup (GA)	AL, GA	32.9871°N 85.4131°W	20:08–20:31	20.74 mi (33.38 km)	1,600 yd (1,500 m)
EF2	This large and strong tornado touched down as the long-tracked, deadly EF3 Old Kingston tornado was dissipating. It initially caused sporadic tree damage as it moved northeastward from near White Plains into Five Points, where a home sustained minor damage and trees were uprooted. Northeast of Five Points, the tornado widened and strengthened, snapping and uprooting a large swath of trees and causing roof damage to a house and some barns. It strengthened further near Standing Rock, where a mobile home was completely destroyed, other mobile homes were pushed off their foundations or suffered major damage, a few frame homes had roof damage, and large tree trunks were snapped. The tornado moved over West Point Lake along the state line into Georgia, where many additional large trees were snapped or uprooted and some homes suffered roof damage. The tornado then steadily weakened, causing additional tree damage and inflicting roof shingle and gutter damage to a few homes before dissipating.						
EF1	NE of Red Level to N of Gantt	Covington	AL	31.43°N 86.57°W	20:23-20:28	5.05 mi (8.13 km)	200 yd (180 m)
EF1	A tornado discovered by satellite imagery tracked east across forested areas. It produced intermittent tree damage before peaking where a narrow swath of forest was significantly damaged. The tornado then quickly weakened and lifted, with damage fading from view on imagery. Initially rated EFU due to limited data, later high-resolution analysis determined it reached high-end EF1 intensity in July 2025.						
EF1	Southern Mableton	Douglas, Cobb	GA	33.783°N 84.607°W	20:30–20:33	1.46 mi (2.35 km)	150 yd (140 m)
EF1	A high-end EF1 tornado quickly formed within a line of severe thunderstorms in the western suburbs of Atlanta. An industrial automotive business lost a portion of its exterior wall and dozens of trees were knocked down onto homes, some of which sustained roof and structural damage.						
EF2	Southern LaGrange to Mountville to NW of Greenville	Troup, Meriwether	GA	32.9927°N 85.0735°W	20:34–20:47	18.83 mi (30.30 km)	1,060 yd (970 m)
EF2	This large, strong tornado was produced by the Selma supercell and first touched down in the southern part of LaGrange, where several metal industrial buildings and warehouses were damaged or destroyed. Roughly one-third of one large warehouse was completely destroyed, with anchor bolts bent or pulled out of the concrete foundation. More than 30 homes sustained significant damage in residential areas of town as multiple homes had roofs and some exterior walls torn off, and a few sustained the destruction of their second stories. Many other homes in LaGrange had considerable roof, siding, and window damage, debris was scattered throughout neighborhoods, and many trees were snapped or uprooted. The tornado then weakened as it exited town and moved to the east-northeast, downing some trees and tree limbs. More trees were snapped or uprooted in Mountville, where four people were injured. As the tornado crossed into Meriwether County, numerous more trees were downed before lifting.						
EF2	NE of Mountville to NW of Hollonville	Meriwether, Pike	GA	33.0517°N 84.8527°W	20:45–21:17	24.55 mi (39.51 km)	1,500 yd (1,400 m)
EF2	This large, long-tracked tornado touched down as the previous EF2 tornado was dissipating. A double-wide mobile home had its roof blown off and was pushed 20 yards (18 m) off its foundation, tearing the structure in half, while two single-wide mobile homes were completely destroyed. Some other mobile homes were also heavily damaged and pushed off their foundations, a frame home had its roof torn off, and a large two-story barn was destroyed. Thousands of large trees were snapped or uprooted along the path, including within the small community of Alps. Some of the trees landed on houses and caused major damage. The tornado dissipated as the EF3 Griffin tornado became the dominant circulation within the parent supercell.						
EF1	WNW of Pine Level	Crenshaw	AL	31.505°N 86.2428°W	20:46–20:47	0.35 mi (0.56 km)	80 yd (73 m)
EF1	A brief tornado snapped or uprooted dozens of trees.						
EF3	W of Hollonville to Experiment to NNE of Locust Grove	Pike, Spalding, Henry	GA	33.1654°N 84.4785°W	21:10–21:45	32.8 mi (52.8 km)	2,200 yd (2,000 m)
EF3	See section on this tornado – 18 people were injured.						
EF2	NW of Hollonville to W of Griffin	Spalding, Pike	GA	33.1959°N 84.4845°W	21:13–21:22	9.26 mi (14.90 km)	1,000 yd (910 m)
EF2	This large tornado snapped or uprooted hundreds of trees, destroyed outbuildings, and damaged a house at the beginning of its path. It then merged with the 2116 UTC EF1 tornado, which increased its intensity to high-end EF2. Several homes and outbuildings were heavily damaged or destroyed and hundreds of additional trees were snapped or uprooted. The tornado then caused further tree damage along with minor to moderate damage to homes before being absorbed by the EF3 Griffin tornado.						
EF1	Mayfield to Southern Camak to NW of Thomson	Hancock, Warren, McDuffie	GA	33.3632°N 82.8028°W	21:15–21:39	18.33 mi (29.50 km)	150 yd (140 m)
EF1	This tornado first touched down in Mayfield where a few trees and tree limbs were downed. The tornado strengthened to high-end EF1 intensity and moved to the northeast, snapping and uprooting many trees, one of which fell onto a house. Two old outbuildings were destroyed as well. As the tornado struck the outskirts of Camak, it uprooted several trees and damaged an old cinder block building. Elsewhere along the path, a metal work shed and an outdoor kitchen were destroyed and several homes had roof and fascia damage.						
EF1	N of Hollonville	Spalding, Pike	GA	33.2147°N 84.4352°W	21:16–21:20	2.66 mi (4.28 km)	300 yd (270 m)
EF1	This tornado snapped trees before being absorbed by the 2113 UTC EF2 tornado. A barn was also damaged, although this may have been due to the EF3 Griffin tornado and not this one.						
EF1	NE of Hollonville to W of Griffin	Pike, Spalding	GA	33.1958°N 84.4144°W	21:17–21:24	6.03 mi (9.70 km)	800 yd (730 m)
EF1	This tornado formed just to the east of the 2113 UTC EF2 tornado. It damaged homes and storage buildings, destroyed storage bins, and snapped or uprooted hundreds of trees before being absorbed by the EF3 Griffin tornado.						
EF2	ESE of East Griffin to Jenkinsburg to S of Mansfield	Spalding, Butts, Newton, Jasper	GA	33.2252°N 84.2021°W	21:27–22:01	31.99 mi (51.48 km)	1,400 yd (1,300 m)
EF2	1 death – See section on this tornado – 10 people were injured.						
EF1	NE of Ariton to Blue Springs	Barbour	AL	31.625°N 85.673°W	21:25–21:38	10.96 mi (17.64 km)	900 yd (820 m)
EF1	Hundreds of trees were downed or damaged, including one that fell on a home. Farm structures were damaged as well.						
EF1	SSW of Jenkinsburg	Butts	GA	33.2502°N 84.1095°W	21:35–21:38	5.81 mi (9.35 km)	150 yd (140 m)
EF1	This low-end EF1 tornado was on the ground simultaneously with the EF3 Griffin tornado and the EF2 Jenkinsburg tornado. It formed south of SR 16 before crossing I-75 and tracking along SR 16 for the rest of its path. A large warehouse had sections of its roof torn off and thrown northeastward into the parking lot. Many trees were snapped or uprooted as well.						
EF0	NE of Pisgah	Jackson	AL	34.7083°N 85.8125°W	21:38–21:41	2.34 mi (3.77 km)	70 yd (64 m)
EF0	A farm building and a home suffered roof damage and trees were uprooted.						
EF1	W of Edwin to N of Lawrenceville	Henry	AL	31.6778°N 85.3872°W	21:45–21:56	7.07 mi (11.38 km)	150 yd (140 m)
EF1	A low-end EF1 tornado inflicted heavy roof and structural damage to several barns and outbuildings and removed some roof shingles from a home. Many trees were downed as well.						
EF1	NE of Jenkinsburg to Worthville to NW of Prospect	Butts, Newton	GA	33.3649°N 83.9775°W	21:49–21:57	9.93 mi (15.98 km)	500 yd (460 m)
EF1	This tornado formed from the remnant circulation of the EF3 Griffin tornado and tracked just to the west of the EF2 Jenkinsburg tornado. A barn was destroyed, a car wash was partially unroofed, and a greenhouse and a few homes were damaged. Many trees were snapped and uprooted along the path as well.						
EF1	Joanna to W of Whitmire	Laurens	SC	34.4123°N 81.8154°W	22:42–22:52	9.05 mi (14.56 km)	100 yd (91 m)
EF1	A weak, but extended-tracked tornado touched down in Joanna, destroying a car wash, and damaging the garage door of a fire station. Continuing northeast of town, the tornado strengthened and snapped or uprooted numerous trees, including some that fell on houses. The tornado then knocked down some more large trees as it crossed SC 72, before dissipating after crossing a railway track in Sumter National Forest.						
EF0	Southern Stanley	Gaston	NC	35.342°N 81.14°W	23:10–23:18	6.06 mi (9.75 km)	25 yd (23 m)
EF0	A weak tornado caused scattered tree damage along its path through the south side of Stanley.						
EF1	N of Greenwood	Greenwood	SC	34.247°N 82.186°W	23:23–23:26	2.07 mi (3.33 km)	75 yd (69 m)
EF1	Many trees were downed at the Greenwood County Airport, and in nearby neighborhoods as well. Some trees fell on homes, two of which were significantly damaged.						
EF1	E of Pineview	Wilcox	GA	32.066°N 83.381°W	00:00–00:05	3.13 mi (5.04 km)	100 yd (91 m)
EF1	This tornado struck a farmstead where several large trees were uprooted and a silo was moved and twisted off its foundation, damaging several metal bracers. A barn and two sheds were destroyed and the home on the property suffered moderate structural damage with several structural pillars and columns displaced. The tornado, which was on the ground simultaneously with the tornado below, moved into inaccessible areas and dissipated.						
EF0	E of Pineview	Wilcox	GA	32.086°N 83.392°W	00:03–00:07	2.2 mi (3.5 km)	200 yd (180 m)
EF0	This tornado was on the ground simultaneously with the tornado above. Dozens of trees were snapped along the path before the tornado moved into inaccessible areas and dissipated.						

=== January 14 event ===
List of confirmed tornadoes – Saturday, January 14, 2023
EF#	Location	County / Parish	State	Start Coord.	Time (UTC)	Path length	Max width
EF0	SSE of Clay	Sacramento	CA	38.32°N 121.14°W	22:00–22:02	0.3 mi (0.48 km)	50 yd (46 m)
EF0	This brief tornado damaged the roofs of two garages and uplifted a wall-less RV structure, which caused it to collapse.						

=== January 16 event ===
List of confirmed tornadoes – Monday, January 16, 2023
EF#	Location	County / Parish	State	Start Coord.	Time (UTC)	Path length	Max width
EF1	ENE of Williamsburg	Iowa	IA	41.67°N 91.99°W	20:01–20:09	4.7 mi (7.6 km)	400 yd (370 m)
EF1	A tornado blew over a semi truck on I-80 and caused minor damage to a cattle shelter and trees.						
EFU	SSE of Cedar Rapids	Linn	IA	41.915°N 91.611°W	20:50–20:51	0.85 mi (1.37 km)	10 yd (9.1 m)
EFU	A storm chaser reported a brief tornado; it did not cause damage.						

=== January 18 event ===
List of confirmed tornadoes – Wednesday, January 18, 2023
EF#	Location	County / Parish	State	Start Coord.	Time (UTC)	Path length	Max width
EF1	Waldo	Columbia	AR	33.3164°N 93.3557°W	16:34–16:44	5.11 mi (8.22 km)	80 yd (73 m)
EF1	This tornado moved through Waldo, snapping or uprooting many trees, downing power poles, and damaging the awning of a church. Outside of town, a small metal outbuilding was destroyed.						
EF1	SW of El Dorado	Union	AR	33.1034°N 92.8093°W	18:40–18:51	9.29 mi (14.95 km)	840 yd (770 m)
EF1	Two double-wide manufactured homes were shifted off their foundations but remained intact due to this high-end EF1 tornado. Numerous trees were snapped or uprooted, some of which caused structural damage upon falling. Two outbuildings were destroyed as well.						

=== January 22 event ===
List of confirmed tornadoes – Sunday, January 22, 2023
EF#	Location	County / Parish	State	Start Coord.	Time (UTC)	Path length	Max width
EF2	NE of Miramar Beach	Walton	FL	30.4116°N 86.3182°W	11:14–11:15	0.78 mi (1.26 km)	85 yd (78 m)
EF2	A brief but strong tornado began in the Driftwood Estates subdivision in Turquoise Beach, causing minor roof damage to several homes. It temporarily lifted over a patch of woods, but touched down again in a residential area and intensified, snapping or damaging trees and inflicting more substantial damage to the roofs of homes. Three homes had large sections of their roof structures uplifted, consistent with low-end EF2 damage. The tornado lifted over Choctawhatchee Bay.						
EF1	S of Tallahassee	Wakulla	FL	30.2939°N 84.2843°W	17:45–17:46	0.33 mi (0.53 km)	200 yd (180 m)
EF1	Numerous pine and oak trees were snapped or uprooted, and falling trees caused damage to manufactured homes and vehicles. One house sustained minor roof damage.						
EF2	Northern Adel to WSW of Nashville	Cook	GA	31.1474°N 83.444°W	22:20–22:28	5.89 mi (9.48 km)	80 yd (73 m)
EF2	A low-end EF2 tornado moved through the northern sections of Adel, just south of Sparks. Half of one anchored structure was shifted off its slab foundation, and an anchored metal building was pushed off its foundation and completely destroyed, with metal beams from the structure lofted into a nearby residential area. Numerous trees were twisted, snapped, or uprooted, several of which fell on homes. A series of centerline irrigation pivots were knocked over, and a motorhome was destroyed.						
EF1	SE of Douglas	Coffee	GA	31.4166°N 82.7684°W	23:11–23:14	3.66 mi (5.89 km)	210 yd (190 m)
EF1	Multiple large barns and a house were damaged by this low-end EF1 tornado. A double-wide mobile home was pushed off its piers and large trees were snapped or uprooted as well.						
EF1	NE of Alma to SW of Surrency	Bacon, Appling	GA	31.5711°N 82.4294°W	23:32–23:42	7.55 mi (12.15 km)	600 yd (550 m)
EF1	This tornado downed multiple trees in Bacon County, eventually crossing the Big Satilla Creek into Appling County. Near the county line, a trailer was tipped over onto a vehicle.						

=== January 24 event ===
List of confirmed tornadoes – Tuesday, January 24, 2023
EF#	Location	County / Parish	State	Start Coord.	Time (UTC)	Path length	Max width
EF0	E of Needville to Sienna	Fort Bend	TX	29.3935°N 95.7429°W	19:45–20:30	14.57 mi (23.45 km)	100 yd (91 m)
EF0	Near Needville, a few manufactured homes sustained shingle and siding damage, a small metal security shed was overturned, and damage to trees and fences occurred. The tornado entered Sienna near the end of its path, inflicting additional tree and fence damage before dissipating. A portion of the damage path was unable to be surveyed due to it being on private property.						
EF0	Western Pearland	Brazoria	TX	29.5305°N 95.3742°W	20:10–20:25	2.45 mi (3.94 km)	50 yd (46 m)
EF0	Trees and fences were damaged, while 10 homes sustained minor roof and window damage.						
EF3	Southeastern Houston to Deer Park to E of McNair	Harris	TX	29.6°N 95.25°W	20:15–20:50	23.66 mi (38.08 km)	1,000 yd (910 m)
EF3	See article on this tornado – Three people were injured.						
EF0	W of Wallisville	Chambers	TX	29.83°N 94.77°W	20:58-21:01	2.39 mi (3.85 km)	30 yd (27 m)
EF0	A short-lived tornado crossed I-10 and damaged some trees.						
EF2	SW of Nome	Liberty	TX	30.0016°N 94.4767°W	21:27–21:28	1.18 mi (1.90 km)	50 yd (46 m)
EF2	This strong tornado quickly developed and struck a home, which had its roof removed, windows shattered, and mud splattered on all sides of it. A storage shed had its roof blown off and a barn was destroyed, injuring a horse. Despite the short damage path, debris from the structures was lofted as far as at least 2 miles (3.2 km) to the north.						
EF1	Taylor Landing	Jefferson	TX	29.833°N 94.1996°W	22:05–22:12	5.5 mi (8.9 km)	75 yd (69 m)
EF1	This low-end EF1 tornado struck Taylor Landing. It mostly caused minor damage to roofs, uprooted trees, and destroyed fences.						
EF1	Northwestern Bridge City	Orange	TX	30.032°N 93.9084°W	22:23–22:29	2.25 mi (3.62 km)	75 yd (69 m)
EF1	Trees, roofs, and electrical transmission lines were damaged at the northwest edge of town. An RV trailer was overturned as well.						
EF2	W of Orangefield, TX to Northwestern Orange, TX to NNE of Vinton, LA	Orange (TX), Calcasieu (LA)	TX, LA	30.0741°N 93.8921°W	22:28–22:55	25.21 mi (40.57 km)	500 yd (460 m)
EF2	This strong tornado reached its peak intensity shortly after touching down near Orangefield, where some mobile homes were heavily damaged or destroyed, and a few frame homes suffered partial to total loss of their roofs. The tornado then weakened as it moved through the outskirts of Pinehurst and Orange, where multiple metal buildings, power poles, and trees were damaged, and homes suffered minor to moderate roof damage. A shop building and some outbuildings were also destroyed, and a stock trailer was flipped. The tornado then crossed the Sabine River into Louisiana. Several houses, RVs, and mobile homes were severely damaged, and two mobile homes were completely destroyed before the tornado dissipated. Numerous large trees were snapped, uprooted, or stripped of their limbs along the path. Two people were injured.						
EF1	NW of Vinton	Calcasieu	LA	30.2248°N 93.6475°W	22:44–22:46	1.39 mi (2.24 km)	75 yd (69 m)
EF1	Sections of roofing were ripped off a mobile home and an outbuilding, and trees were snapped. The tornado was a satellite to the above tornado and eventually merged with it.						
EF2	SE of DeQuincy to SSE of Ragley	Calcasieu, Beauregard	LA	30.3578°N 93.3634°W	23:05–23:18	12.43 mi (20.00 km)	300 yd (270 m)
EF2	This strong tornado touched and moved to the northeast, where power lines were downed and a few homes were damaged, including one that had a large part of its roof torn off, and another that was unroofed and sustained collapse of exterior walls. The tornado moved directly through the small community of Gaytine before dissipating, where several homes were damaged, two of which had their roofs completely torn off. A mobile home was rolled and destroyed, some outbuildings were also destroyed, and a metal building was heavily damaged. A fifth-wheel RV trailer was flipped over and numerous trees were snapped or uprooted as well, some of which fell on homes. Three people were injured.						
EF1	S Ragley to W of Reeves	Beauregard	LA	30.4612°N 93.2406°W	23:12–23:19	6.47 mi (10.41 km)	75 yd (69 m)
EF1	This tornado formed to the north of the tornado above and tracked over mostly open fields or forested areas. Some outbuildings and a shop building were damaged, power poles were leaned over, and trees were snapped or uprooted.						
EF1	Ventress	Pointe Coupee	LA	30.69°N 91.42°W	01:37–01:40	1.15 mi (1.85 km)	75 yd (69 m)
EF1	Three unanchored or poorly anchored mobile homes were destroyed by this brief low-end EF1 tornado. The first one, which was abandoned, was rolled while the second one was tossed into the third. Elsewhere in town, homes had shingle and siding damage, and some trees were downed as well. Three people were injured.						
EF1	NE of Bayou Cane	Lafourche	LA	29.6677°N 90.7027°W	04:01–04:09	3.2 mi (5.1 km)	75 yd (69 m)
EF1	An RV that was not tied down was flipped, and minor damage was inflicted to a nearby fence. A house had a large piece of roofing removed, while another home suffered minor damage. A barn was destroyed after being shifted off its foundation as well.						
EFU	WNW of Jean Lafitte	Jefferson	LA	29.75°N 90.15°W	04:55–04:58	2.91 mi (4.68 km)	100 yd (91 m)
EFU	A tornado was discovered after further analysis via high-resolution satellite imagery. The tornado appears to have started over Lake Salvador before moving into the Jean Lafitte National Historical Park and Preserve, where shrub damage could be seen on satellite. The tornado dissipated shortly after.						

=== January 25 event ===
List of confirmed tornadoes – Wednesday, January 25, 2023
EF#	Location	County / Parish	State	Start Coord.	Time (UTC)	Path length	Max width
EF0	NNE of Grayton Beach	Walton	FL	30.35°N 86.15°W	11:04-11:07	1.48 mi (2.38 km)	50 yd (46 m)
EF0	A brief TDS occurred on radar in a forested area, with only tree damaging being noted.						
EF0	N of Alys Beach	Walton	FL	30.3557°N 86.0433°W	11:15–11:17	0.57 mi (0.92 km)	75 yd (69 m)
EF0	This brief, weak tornado caused tree damage in a heavily wooded area.						
EF0	SE of Freeport to W of Ebro	Walton	FL	30.43°N 86.05°W	11:16-11:20	2.75 mi (4.43 km)	50 yd (46 m)
EF0	A tornado tracked through a forest, causing only tree damage.						
EF0	S of Estiffanulga	Liberty	FL	30.2885°N 85.0355°W	13:34–13:35	0.47 mi (0.76 km)	50 yd (46 m)
EF0	This brief tornado caused minor damage to a single-family home and flipped an adjacent outbuilding into a nearby tree line.						
EF1	SSW of Tallahassee	Leon	FL	30.3172°N 84.3812°W	15:23–15:27	3.24 mi (5.21 km)	550 yd (500 m)
EF1	Numerous trees were snapped or uprooted in the Apalachicola National Forest south of the Tallahassee International Airport.						

== February ==
Confirmed tornadoes by Enhanced Fujita rating
EFU	EF0	EF1	EF2	EF3	EF4	EF5	Total
4	19	25	8	0	0	0	56

=== February 8 event ===
List of confirmed tornadoes – Wednesday, February 8, 2023
EF#	Location	County / Parish	State	Start Coord.	Time (UTC)	Path length	Max width
EF2	NW of Fluker to Tangipahoa	Tangipahoa	LA	30.8398°N 90.5326°W	23:51–23:57	3.42 mi (5.50 km)	175 yd (160 m)
EF2	This tornado began along I-55 and moved north-northeast through Tangipahoa. Numerous mobile homes were either heavily damaged or destroyed, and the metal frame of one mobile home was severely twisted. A gas station convenience store had significant roof and wall damage, a church sustained extensive damage to its roof and exterior, and a vacant business was unroofed. A few other homes sustained less severe damage, small outbuildings were destroyed, and many trees were snapped or uprooted.						
EF2	Grand Prairie	St. Landry	LA	30.6625°N 92.1568°W	00:45–00:50	3.63 mi (5.84 km)	225 yd (206 m)
EF2	The roof of a well-constructed home was ripped off, and several large hardwood trees were snapped. A few other homes were damaged to a lesser degree, and some outbuildings were damaged as well.						
EF1	NE of Le Moyen	St. Landry	LA	30.8187°N 92.0218°W	01:03–01:06	1.49 mi (2.40 km)	100 yd (91 m)
EF1	Five homes and some outbuildings were damaged.						
EF0	N of Salem	Walthall	MS	31.2862°N 90.1128°W	01:11–01:12	1.03 mi (1.66 km)	40 yd (37 m)
EF0	A church sustained minor roof and siding damage, and several trees were downed.						
EF0	NE of Sartinville	Lawrence	MS	31.3506°N 90.0792°W	01:22–01:25	0.68 mi (1.09 km)	75 yd (69 m)
EF0	A small barn was destroyed, while a shed and a larger barn were damaged.						
EF1	NE of Sartinville	Lawrence	MS	31.3926°N 90.0633°W	01:30–01:31	0.19 mi (0.31 km)	50 yd (46 m)
EF1	A brief tornado heavily damaged a metal shed, with concrete footings pulled out of the ground. A house sustained roof damage as well, with insulation blown into nearby trees. The path may have been slightly longer but was inaccessible by road.						
EF1	W of D'Lo to E of Braxton	Simpson	MS	31.9779°N 89.9492°W	02:06–02:14	3.73 mi (6.00 km)	300 yd (270 m)
EF1	Several metal and wood sheds were damaged, a home had shingle damage, and several trees were downed.						
EF1	NE of New Hebron to WSW of Magee	Simpson	MS	31.7806°N 89.8657°W	02:22–02:30	4.17 mi (6.71 km)	100 yd (91 m)
EF1	Shingles were removed from homes, the skirting on a mobile home was damaged, and a small animal pen and fences were damaged. Small trees were downed along the path.						

=== February 9 event ===
List of confirmed tornadoes – Thursday, February 9, 2023
EF#	Location	County / Parish	State	Start Coord.	Time (UTC)	Path length	Max width
EF1	NW of Eucheeanna	Walton	FL	30.6566°N 86.0573°W	02:26–02:28	0.18 mi (0.29 km)	50 yd (46 m)
EF1	A brief tornado snapped and uprooted numerous pine and hardwood trees.						

=== February 16 event ===
List of confirmed tornadoes – Thursday, February 16, 2023
EF#	Location	County / Parish	State	Start Coord.	Time (UTC)	Path length	Max width
EF1	SE of Boston	Newton	AR	35.7864°N 93.4669°W	07:15–07:22	3.4 mi (5.5 km)	200 yd (180 m)
EF1	Several outbuildings and barns were damaged or completely destroyed, and many trees were snapped or uprooted.						
EF2	SW of Pindall to SE of Bruno	Searcy, Marion	AR	36.0425°N 92.9051°W	07:59–08:13	10.97 mi (17.65 km)	250 yd (230 m)
EF2	This tornado damaged roofs, destroyed barns, and snapped or uprooted numerous trees, some of which fell on and briefly closed US 65. A house was shifted from its foundation and partially collapsed. Two people were injured.						
EF1	SW of Marshall	Searcy	AR	35.8649°N 92.7179°W	08:21–08:25	1.35 mi (2.17 km)	75 yd (69 m)
EF1	A tornado struck the Canaan community, where the roof was ripped off a small shed, and trees were snapped or uprooted.						
EF1	ESE of Wesson	Lincoln	MS	31.6756°N 90.3063°W	17:16–17:18	1.06 mi (1.71 km)	75 yd (69 m)
EF1	A mobile home was rolled and destroyed, and another mobile home sustained damage to its roofing and skirting. A permanent home also sustained roof damage, and a couple of trees were snapped.						
EF1	SW of Mize	Smith	MS	31.8363°N 89.5982°W	19:23–19:24	0.23 mi (0.37 km)	50 yd (46 m)
EF1	A brief tornado destroyed a chicken house and threw tin 0.25 miles (0.40 km) away. A couple of trees were snapped.						
EF2	Northern Ripley	Tippah	MS	34.7259°N 89.0426°W	19:33–19:49	11.01 mi (17.72 km)	500 yd (460 m)
EF2	This tornado began west of Ripley, reaching its peak strength immediately after it touched down, as two metal truss electrical transmission towers were knocked over, and numerous large trees were snapped. Some wooden power poles were also damaged, and an irrigation pivot was overturned. The tornado weakened as it continued to the northeast, inflicting varying degrees of roof damage to multiple houses, one of which had significant damage due to garage door and ceiling failure. Mobile homes sustained minor damage, outbuildings were damaged or destroyed, and some trees and power poles were downed. Weakening further, the tornado moved into the north side of Ripley. There, a few homes sustained minor damage, along with a gas station and a store. A Dollar General sign and some trees in town were also damaged. The tornado continued to the northeast of Ripley, downing a few more trees and power poles, and causing minor damage to a mobile home and an outbuilding before dissipating. One person was injured.						
EF1	N of Ramer to NW of Eastview	McNairy	TN	35.0939°N 88.6307°W	19:43–19:48	3.13 mi (5.04 km)	105 yd (96 m)
EF1	Two garages were destroyed, and house had a significant amount of roofing material removed, along with its porch. Numerous trees were snapped or uprooted as well.						
EF0	SSW of Bassfield	Jefferson Davis	MS	31.4664°N 89.7564°W	20:24–20:25	0.08 mi (0.13 km)	50 yd (46 m)
EF0	A very brief high-end EF0 tornado destroyed a shed, damaged the tin roof of an outbuilding, and blew shingles off a single family home. A few trees were snapped as well.						
EF0	W of Lawrenceburg	Lawrence	TN	35.2491°N 87.4872°W	21:38–21:44	3.3 mi (5.3 km)	150 yd (140 m)
EF0	Numerous trees were snapped or blown down, including one that fell on and crushed much of a house. Outbuildings were damaged as well.						
EF1	W of Smithville	Monroe	MS	34.0608°N 88.4525°W	21:52–21:55	1.63 mi (2.62 km)	100 yd (91 m)
EF1	Numerous trees were downed in a rural area near the Tombigbee River by this low-end EF1 tornado.						
EF0	Northern Ethridge	Lawrence	TN	35.34°N 87.29°W	21:57–22:03	3.44 mi (5.54 km)	200 yd (180 m)
EF0	The storefront was blown off a building. A few homes and several farm outbuildings sustained damage. Numerous trees were snapped or uprooted.						
EF1	NNE of Lewisburg	Marshall	TN	35.5158°N 86.7595°W	22:38–22:42	1.41 mi (2.27 km)	100 yd (91 m)
EF1	Many dozens of trees were downed, some of which fell on and damaged homes and outbuildings. An RV was blown over, and a horse trailer was partially blown on top of it. Another house sustained minor exterior damage, and several barns were damaged or destroyed. Some debris from one barn was blown up to 600 yards (550 m) away.						

=== February 17 event ===
List of confirmed tornadoes – Friday, February 17, 2023
EF#	Location	County / Parish	State	Start Coord.	Time (UTC)	Path length	Max width
EF1	LaGrange	Troup	GA	33.0252°N 85.0644°W	09:31–09:38	5.74 mi (9.24 km)	200 yd (180 m)
EF1	A tornado moved through southern portions of LaGrange, where several businesses in a shopping district sustained damage to their signs and roofs, and windows were broken at a gas station car wash. Homes in town were also damaged, along with the roofs of a brewery and a Georgia Public Health building. A fence was partially destroyed when a set of bleachers was tossed into it. Numerous trees were snapped or uprooted along the path, one of which fell on a home and caused considerable damage. This tornado occurred just north of the path of a damaging EF2 tornado that had struck LaGrange the prior month.						

=== February 21 event ===
List of confirmed tornadoes – Tuesday, February 21, 2023
EF#	Location	County / Parish	State	Start Coord.	Time (UTC)	Path length	Max width
EF2	Lawrence to West Windsor	Mercer	NJ	40.2785°N 74.7028°W	20:35–20:41	5.8 mi (9.3 km)	200 yd (180 m)
EF2	An unusual significant winter tornado touched down in the northeastern suburbs of Trenton, inflicting low-end EF2 damage at an apartment complex, where multiple three-story apartment buildings had gables and sections of their roofs torn off. Elsewhere, a tutoring center had its roof partially peeled back, and many trees and tree branches were snapped. This tornado became the first February tornado in New Jersey since 1999, and the first F2/EF2 or stronger in February since 1973 in the state.						

=== February 23 event ===
List of confirmed tornadoes – Thursday, February 23, 2023
EF#	Location	County / Parish	State	Start Coord.	Time (UTC)	Path length	Max width
EF0	La Mirada	Los Angeles	CA	33.91°N 117.98°W	19:30-19:35	0.07 mi (0.11 km)	15 yd (14 m)
EF0	A brief, non-supercell tornado damaged multiple trees.						

=== February 26 event ===
List of confirmed tornadoes – Sunday, February 26, 2023
EF#	Location	County / Parish	State	Start Coord.	Time (UTC)	Path length	Max width
EF0	Eastern Liberal	Seward	KS	37.014°N 100.9198°W	22:42–22:54	3.89 mi (6.26 km)	20 yd (18 m)
EF0	A small high-end EF0 tornado moved through the eastern edge of Liberal. A house and an adjacent outbuilding suffered garage door failure, resulting in the uplift of a portion of the roof deck, while other homes had minor damage. A few mobile homes sustained roof and window damage, one of which slid off its foundation blocks. An outbuilding was heavily damaged, and a small, unanchored garden shed was rolled 30 feet (9.1 m). Fencing was blown over, and some empty plastic chemical tanks were tossed around.						
EF0	WNW of Shamrock	Wheeler	TX	35.2457°N 100.3964°W	00:29–00:30	0.19 mi (0.31 km)	25 yd (23 m)
EF0	A very brief tornado was captured on video; no damage was observed.						
EF1	SE of Kelton	Wheeler	TX	35.3868°N 100.1214°W	00:41–00:46	1.88 mi (3.03 km)	50 yd (46 m)
EF1	This high-end EF1 tornado captured on video by a storm chaser as it touched down southeast of the rural community of Kelton. A metal outbuilding was completely destroyed, with debris strewn downwind and wrapped around trees. Another outbuilding was damaged, trees were snapped or uprooted, and tumbleweeds were blown into a fence that was partially knocked down.						
EFU	NE of Dodson, TX to SSE of Vinson	Harmon	OK	34.81°N 99.954°W	01:08–01:14	7.5 mi (12.1 km)	200 yd (180 m)
EFU	Storm chasers observed a tornado. No damage was observed, and the tornado's path length is estimated.						
EF2	Western Cheyenne to W of Strong City	Roger Mills	OK	35.61°N 99.70°W	01:13–01:18	7 mi (11 km)	500 yd (460 m)
EF2	1 death – A high-end EF2 tornado touched down at the Mignon Laird Municipal Airport and caused major damage as it struck the west edge of Cheyenne, along with rural areas north-northeast of town. Several manufactured homes were obliterated and swept away, and an occupant of one of the residences was killed. Debris from the manufactured homes was scattered long distances through fields, vehicles were flipped and tossed, and major tree damage occurred, including some debarking. A cell tower was toppled over, and a two-story frame home had a large section of its roof removed, along with a second floor exterior wall. A few other houses also had significant roof damage, and an RV was rolled into the side of one residence. Outbuildings were also damaged or destroyed, power poles were snapped, and an ODOT building had a large section of its roof torn off. Some metal-framed buildings were also heavily damaged, one of which sustained buckling of its roof purlins. In addition to the fatality, at least three people were injured. A photograph from one of the destroyed mobile homes was found roughly 100 miles (160 km) away in Lambert.						
EF1	S of Erick	Beckham	OK	35.15°N 99.918°W	01:13–01:18	6 mi (9.7 km)	100 yd (91 m)
EF1	A few barns were destroyed, while power lines and tree branches were damaged as well.						
EF1	ENE of Vinson to S of Willow	Greer	OK	34.937°N 99.682°W	01:23–01:34	11 mi (18 km)	75 yd (69 m)
EF1	Trees were damaged or uprooted, power poles were snapped, and outbuildings were damaged. This tornado was upgraded from EF0 to EF1 by the National Weather Service in Norman, Oklahoma three months later.						
EF1	E of Lone Wolf to NNW of Hobart	Kiowa	OK	34.987°N 99.202°W	01:45–01:54	7.5 mi (12.1 km)	600 yd (550 m)
EF1	This tornado was caught on video via a Ring security camera. A propane tank was tossed, power poles were snapped, and tree limbs were downed. Outbuildings were damaged or destroyed, and metal debris was thrown into fields. A stop sign was blown over as well.						
EF0	NW of Amorita	Alfalfa	OK	36.94°N 98.306°W	02:31–02:32	0.2 mi (0.32 km)	50 yd (46 m)
EF0	A farm shed was destroyed by this brief tornado.						
EF0	NW of Gracemont	Caddo	OK	35.163°N 98.284°W	02:32–02:39	5.1 mi (8.2 km)	75 yd (69 m)
EF0	Trees were damaged and granite headstones were moved at a cemetery.						
EF0	WSW of Minco	Grady	OK	35.276°N 98.013°W	02:52–02:53	0.25 mi (0.40 km)	75 yd (69 m)
EF0	This brief tornado damaged a barn and a garage.						
EF1	W of Tuttle to WNW of Mustang	Grady, Canadian	OK	35.284°N 97.867°W	02:57–03:07	10.7 mi (17.2 km)	200 yd (180 m)
EF1	This tornado passed to the west of Tuttle and Mustang, inflicting major roof damage to multiple homes, and damaging or destroying several metal outbuildings. Power poles were snapped, a decorative brick wall was blown over, and a stop sign was bent to the ground. A few trees were uprooted as well.						
EF1	Western Oklahoma City to Bethany	Oklahoma	OK	35.424°N 97.66°W	03:12–03:18	5.5 mi (8.9 km)	500 yd (460 m)
EF1	This tornado moved through the western suburbs of Oklahoma City. Metal buildings and a restaurant supply business had roofing torn off, and another business had one of its exterior walls blown out. Carports, fences, power poles, and trees were damaged as well.						
EF2	NE of Cole to Southeastern Norman to SSW of Newalla	McClain, Cleveland	OK	35.123°N 97.55°W	03:15–03:38	26.12 mi (42.04 km)	900 yd (820 m)
EF2	A strong, fast-moving and damaging tornado touched down near Cole and moved northeastward, damaging the roofs of homes, overturning a semi-truck on I-35, snapping power poles, and causing considerable damage to hangars at the David J Perry Airport in Goldsby. The tornado crossed the Canadian River into the southeastern part of Norman and strengthened to high-end EF2 intensity, destroying part of a self-storage facility, heavily damaging two gas stations, and damaging 450 homes and some apartment buildings. 150 homes sustained some sort of roof damage, 50 of which had partial to total loss of their roofs, along with a few that had some loss of exterior walls. The NCED Hotel and Conference Center sustained considerable damage to one of its exterior walls, and several cars were flipped, moved, or damaged by flying debris. Many trees were snapped or uprooted in Norman, and numerous wooden power poles were also snapped. Continuing northeast of Norman, the tornado damaged many additional homes, several of which had their roofs and exterior walls ripped off at high-end EF2 strength. Extensive tree and power pole damage occurred before the tornado moved farther to the northeast, causing less intense damage to trees and power poles in and around the rural community of Stella before dissipating. The tornado injured twelve people and caused $50.2 million (2023 USD) in damage. In an analysis of the tornado, it was determined that this tornado was moving over 60 miles per hour (97 km/h).						
EF1	SSE of Newalla to southern McLoud	Cleveland, Pottawatomie	OK	35.376°N 97.146°W	03:42–03:48	6 mi (9.7 km)	100 yd (91 m)
EF1	A couple of homes had roof damage, a mobile home was damaged, and an RV was overturned. Outbuildings were damaged, power poles were snapped, and trees were snapped or uprooted.						
EF2	Northern Shawnee to E of Meeker	Pottawatomie, Lincoln	OK	35.39°N 96.922°W	03:45–03:51	6.1 mi (9.8 km)	200 yd (180 m)
EF2	This strong tornado touched down just north of the Shawnee Mall at the northern edge of Shawnee, snapping power poles and overturning pivot irrigation sprinklers. It tracked to the north-northeast and reached high-end EF2 strength as it moved into Aydelotte, where it partially or completely unroofed a few homes, overturned vehicles, downed trees, and damaged or destroyed well-built garages and storage buildings. The tornado crossed into Lincoln County and caused some additional tree and outbuilding damage before dissipating. Another high-end EF2 tornado would strike Shawnee and Aydelotte on April 19.						

=== February 27 event ===
List of confirmed tornadoes – Monday, February 27, 2023
EF#	Location	County / Parish	State	Start Coord.	Time (UTC)	Path length	Max width
EF1	NW of McElhany	Newton	MO	36.80°N 94.42°W	07:02–07:03	0.75 mi (1.21 km)	200 yd (180 m)
EF1	Over ten farm outbuildings and farm implements were heavily damaged or destroyed, two RVs were rolled, and minor roof damage was inflicted to a few homes. Trees and power lines were damaged as well.						
EF0	E of Golden City	Dade	MO	37.372°N 94.045°W	07:25–07:27	1.65 mi (2.66 km)	200 yd (180 m)
EF0	A large machinery outbuilding was heavily damaged, with tin from the structure being strewn in a cyclonic manner. Tree limbs were downed as well.						
EF0	E of Cane Hill	Dade	MO	37.56°N 93.69°W	07:47–07:49	1.29 mi (2.08 km)	100 yd (91 m)
EF0	A few weakly-rooted trees were uprooted, and large branches were broken off other trees.						
EF0	E of Bondville	Champaign	IL	40.0975°N 88.3564°W	14:43–14:44	1.14 mi (1.83 km)	30 yd (27 m)
EF0	A farm outbuilding suffered minor damage.						
EFU	N of Champaign	Champaign	IL	40.1694°N 88.2649°W	14:55–14:56	1.53 mi (2.46 km)	25 yd (23 m)
EFU	A tornado touched down and crossed I-57, inflicting no damage.						
EFU	SW of Clarence	Ford	IL	40.4400°N 88.0000°W	15:15–15:17	1.6 mi (2.6 km)	50 yd (46 m)
EFU	A tornado was confirmed by eyewitness accounts and photos and videos. No known damage occurred.						
EF0	NW of Shorewood to Southwestern Plainfield	Kendall, Will	IL	41.5501°N 88.2636°W	15:41–15:44	2.2 mi (3.5 km)	100 yd (91 m)
EF0	This high-end EF0 tornado inflicted trim and roof shingle damage to numerous homes as it moved through residential areas. A few homes also had damage to gutters and windows, and one home suffered additional damage after a trampoline was thrown into it, impaling several pieces of it into the home's siding. The roof of a garden shed was damaged, and trees and tree branches were downed as well.						
EF0	Northern Naperville	DuPage	IL	41.7839°N 88.1619°W	15:52–15:54	1.4 mi (2.3 km)	30 yd (27 m)
EF0	Several trees were damaged in Naperville as a result of this weak tornado.						
EF1	SE of McCordsville	Hancock	IN	39.8656°N 85.9115°W	18:28–18:34	5.24 mi (8.43 km)	50 yd (46 m)
EF1	A high-end EF1 tornado damaged the roof of a warehouse and destroyed a farm outbuilding. A large and historic barn was damaged and slid off its foundation, and numerous trees were snapped.						
EF1	Eden	Hancock	IN	39.9423°N 85.7692°W	18:37–18:39	0.29 mi (0.47 km)	50 yd (46 m)
EF1	A brief tornado touched down in the rural community of Eden, removing the roof and exterior wall of a barn, and driving 2x4 beams into the ground at different angles downwind of the structure. Several trees were snapped or uprooted as well.						
EF1	Jacksonburg to NW of Middletown	Butler	OH	39.5381°N 84.5036°W	19:37–19:43	4.17 mi (6.71 km)	150 yd (140 m)
EF1	This tornado first touched down in Jacksonburg, where minor tree and outbuilding damage occurred. The tornado continued to the northeast, where homes suffered minor to severe roof and siding damage, including one two-story home that was unroofed and had a second story back wall knocked down at high-end EF1 strength. A nearby barn was also leveled on the property, with debris from the structure being strewn through an adjacent field. An RV trailer was tipped over onto a vehicle, and dozens of trees were snapped or uprooted along the path as well.						
EF0	Convoy	Van Wert	OH	40.9171°N 84.7159°W	20:00–20:02	0.59 mi (0.95 km)	75 yd (69 m)
EF0	A weak tornado lofted a swing set and tossed a small, unanchored chicken coop over a shed. The side of the shed was pushed in, while its metal roofing was pushed out. Sporadic tree and shingle damage occurred in town as well.						
EF1	N of Dodo to W of Dialton	Clark	OH	40.0091°N 84.004°W	20:19–20:21	2.31 mi (3.72 km)	300 yd (270 m)
EF1	A barn was completely destroyed, and several homes had roof shingles and siding removed, including four well-built homes that suffered minor to moderate roof damage. One of the homes also had its garage door blown in, and trees were snapped or uprooted as well, including one tree that fell on and severely damaged a home's front porch awning.						
EFU	SW of Redway	Mendocino	CA	39.9844°N 124.0016°W	20:24–20:25	0.1 mi (0.16 km)	10 yd (9.1 m)
EFU	Public video shows a waterspout moving onshore from the Pacific Ocean and quickly dissipating as the terrain became steeper.						
EF0	SW of Orient	Pickaway	OH	39.7889°N 83.1773°W	21:03–21:05	1.35 mi (2.17 km)	100 yd (91 m)
EF0	A high-end EF0 tornado rolled two strapped down single-wide manufactured homes onto their sides and caused lesser damage to several other nearby manufactured homes. A garage was unroofed, and multiple abandoned farm structures at the Pickaway Correctional Institution sustained considerable damage. A frame home sustained minor roof damage, and trees and tree branches were downed. The tornado dissipated as it was entering Orient, although building insulation was found in trees throughout the town.						
EF0	SE of Etna	Licking	OH	39.9491°N 82.6492°W	21:41–21:42	0.29 mi (0.47 km)	90 yd (82 m)
EF0	A brief tornado lofted a small metal shed over some trees, with debris scattered 200 feet (61 m) away. Several softwood trees were snapped or uprooted as well.						

== See also ==
- Tornadoes of 2023
- List of United States tornadoes from November to December 2022
- List of United States tornadoes in March 2023
