= Little Texas (disambiguation) =

Little Texas is an American country music band.

Little Texas may also refer to:

- Little Texas (album), an album by the band
- Little Texas (Tokyo restaurant), a Texan cuisine restaurant and country music venue in Tokyo
- Little Texas, Alabama, an unincorporated community in Macon County
- Little Texas, Virginia, an unincorporated community in Southampton County
