= Addie Anderson Wilson =

American composer and musician

Addie Anderson Wilson (August 17, 1876 – October 8, 1966) was an American composer, organist and carillonist who was born in Lawrenceville, Alabama, and lived in Alabama for most of her life. She studied music with Mary Carr Moore and M. Wilson. She married William Sidney Wilson on November 9, 1892, and they had one son.

== Life and career ==
Wilson was active in civic affairs and music organizations, winning awards and holding several elected positions, such as:

- First Vice President, Alabama Federation of Music Clubs
- President, Harmony Club of Dothan, Alabama
- President, Music Study Club
- Woman of the Year, Dothan, Alabama

== Works ==
Wilson composed several operettas and piano pieces, which were initially published by George Willig & Co and Carl Fischer Music. She also composed:

=== Piano ===
- "Southern Breezes"

=== Vocal ===
- "Apple Blossoms"
- "Evening Song"
- "Faith" (text from Mark X:36–52)
- "Goodnight, Mr. Moon"
- "Hi, Mr. Sunshine"
- "I Will Give You Rest" (a cappella chorus; text from Matthew XI:28–30)
- "Lullaby"
- "Under the Rose" (words by Richard Henry Stoddard)
- "Whenever Skies are Gray"
