= 2023 Pasadena–Deer Park tornado =

EF3 tornado in Texas

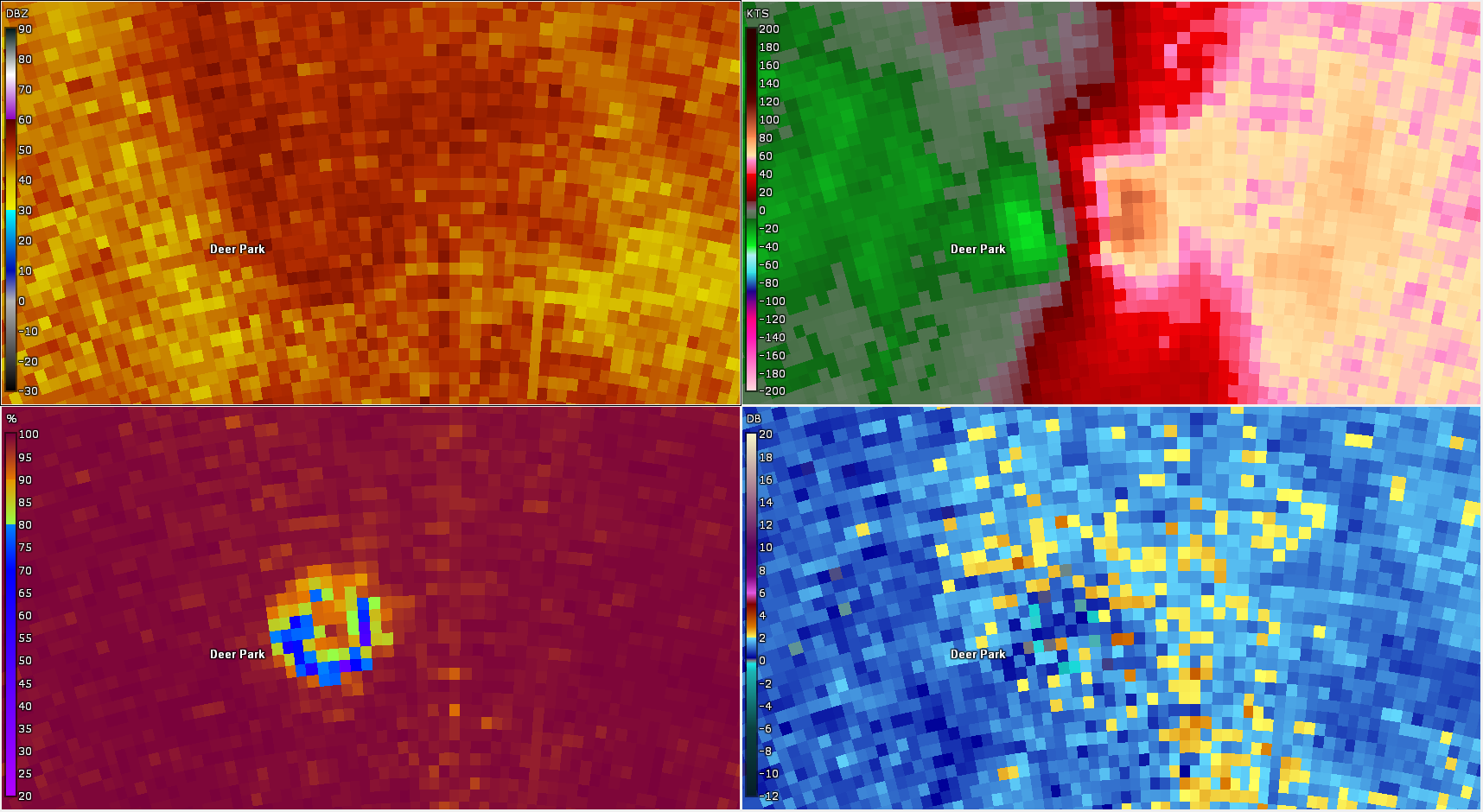
- NEXRAD radar data of the EF3 tornado in Deer Park, Texas. An annular ring of debris circling the tornado is visible on the correlation coefficient (bottom left)

Meteorological history
- Formed: January 24, 2023, 2:15 p.m. CST (UTC−06:00)
- Dissipated: January 24, 2023, 2:50 p.m. CST (UTC−06:00)
- Duration: 35 minutes

EF3 tornado
- on the Enhanced Fujita scale
- Highest winds: 140 mph (230 km/h)

Overall effects
- Fatalities: 0
- Injuries: 3
- Damage: $6.6 million (2023 USD)
- Power outages: >20,000
- Part of the tornado outbreaks of 2023

On the afternoon of January 24, 2023, a large, intense, rain-wrapped tornado moved through the suburbs of Pasadena and Deer Park, in the Houston metropolitan area in Texas. The National Weather Service rated the most-severe damage from the tornado low-end EF3 on the Enhanced Fujita scale with winds estimated at 140 miles per hour (230 km/h). The tornado prompted the issuance of a tornado emergency, the first to be issued by the National Weather Service's forecast office in Houston. The tornado was the strongest cold-season tornado to strike the Houston area since 1992. The staff of KTRK-TV published in December 2023 that the tornado was "hands down the most impactful weather story" covered by the news station during the year. The tornado injured three people, and was part of a small outbreak that produced 19 tornadoes across Texas, Louisiana, and Florida from January 24–25.

== Tornado summary ==
The tornado touched down in southeastern Houston to the east of Brookside Village in El Franco Lee Park and began moving northeast at EF0 to EF1 strength. The tornado caused minor damage to several homes, trees, and fences before strengthening and striking the Beamer Place Apartments at EF2 intensity. Roofs were torn off of several two-story apartment buildings at this location. The nearby Beverly Hills Intermediate School and Challenger Intermediate School were also damaged at EF2 intensity. As the tornado crossed I-45, it caused mainly mid-range EF1 damage to several apartment buildings, businesses, homes, and Genoa Elementary School as it entered the Genoa neighborhood. A small pocket of high-end EF2 damage occurred in this area as a metal building was destroyed. By this point, the National Weather Service office in Houston had issued a tornado emergency.

The tornado then caused high-end-EF1 to low-end EF2 damage as it entered the southeastern part of Pasadena and moved through Burke Crenshaw Park, where most of a building's roof was blown off. Continuing through Pasadena, the tornado then caused considerable roof damage as it struck Pasadena Memorial High School, several businesses, and many homes at EF1 intensity. Many trees in this area were downed. The National Weather Service estimated the tornado was at least 0.5 miles (0.80 km) wide as it crossed Fairmont Parkway. After crossing Beltway 8, the tornado entered a subdivision near Bliss Meadows Park and caused significant damage to homes. Some homes had their roofs torn off, a few had some exterior walls removed, one home was mostly destroyed, and damage in this area was rated EF2. After briefly weakening, more EF2 damage occurred as homes in the eastern part of the Golden Acres neighborhood were severely damaged, and a church was largely destroyed. The tornado then weakened and produced EF0 to EF1 damage after it crossed Red Bluff Road, downing trees and damaging the roofs of many homes in residential areas, a few of which had large portions of their roofs removed.

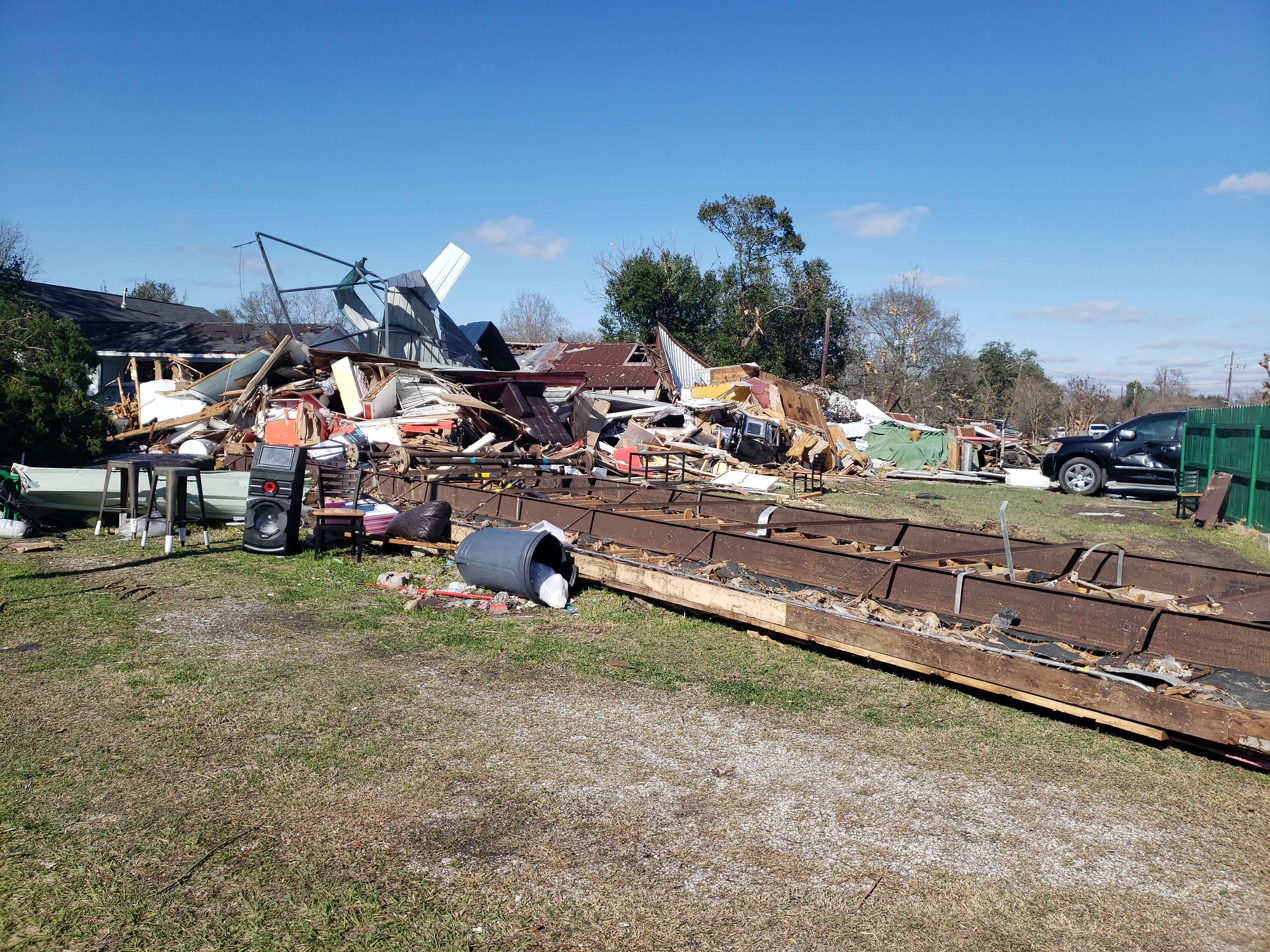
A mobile home destroyed in Baytown at high-end EF1 intensity

As the tornado crossed Center Street and entered Deer Park, it re-strengthened to EF2 intensity. According to the National Weather Service, a Walgreens, Deer Park Public Library, and St. Hyacinth Catholic Church were heavily damaged at EF2 intensity along this section of the path. The San Jacinto Manor nursing home suffered major structural damage, including partial collapse of its roof and walls, forcing its residents to evacuate the building. Many trees and power poles were snapped, and a few cars were thrown up to 50 yd (46 m) from the parking lot of Deer Park High School South and mangled. Throughout Deer Park, numerous homes sustained roof, window, and exterior damage, and a few suffered more severe structural damage, including a single home at the corner of E X Street and Luella Avenue that had its whole roof and several walls removed at EF2 intensity. As the tornado approached and then crossed SH 225, it weakened and produced widespread high-end EF0 to EF1 damage as trees were downed, and many homes sustained damage to their roofs and garages. The Deer Park Shell chemical plant began flaring because of a "loss of on-site steam". In industrial areas along Independence Parkway South, stacks of metal shipping containers were knocked over. As the tornado passed just south of San Jacinto Battleground State Historic Site, it rapidly intensified to its peak strength of low-end EF3. Here, multiple large metal transmission towers were toppled.

The National Weather Service estimated winds up to 140 miles per hour (230 km/h) were needed to flatten the towers. After reaching EF3 intensity, the tornado weakened and crossed Houston Ship Channel into the Wooster section of Baytown at high-end EF1 strength. Several mobile homes in this area were damaged or destroyed, and some houses were completely shifted off their foundations. After leaving Baytown, the tornado further weakened to EF0 intensity, causing minor damage to power lines and some industrial building before it lifted near I-10.

== Aftermath ==
In total, the tornado caused $6.6 million (2023 USD) in damage and injured three people along its 23.66 miles (38.08 km) path. A CoreLogic analysis estimated "approximately 18,600 single and multifamily residential properties with a combined reconstruction value (RCV) of $4.6 [billion] were potentially within the tornado path in Harris County", though the number of damaged or destroyed structures was lower. While the National Oceanic and Atmospheric Administration (NOAA) reported the tornado did not injure anyone, Sylvester Turner, the mayor of Houston reported three people were transported to hospital in non-life-threatening condition. In April 2023, the tornado's total path length was officially reported as 23.66 miles (38.08 km) but in July the same year, KTRK-TV meteorologist Elyse Smith reported the path length was just over 18 miles (29 km). David Tillman, the chief meteorologist for ABC13 in Houston, later stated, "that's probably the strongest, rain wrapped tornado I've been around".

In the days following the tornado, all of the school districts in Deer Park and Pasadena canceled classes to allow families to assess damage. CenterPoint Energy reported over 20,000 homes were without power, and the Red Cross opened a shelter in Pasadena. In August 2023, William Stokes, a deaf 17-year-old, presented before Deer Park City Council with a proposal to implement strobe lights on ten of the cities' emergency warning towers. The city council acted on the proposal and added strobe lights to their emergency warning towers.

== Other tornadoes ==
EFU	EF0	EF1	EF2	EF3	EF4	EF5
1	7	7	3	1	0	0

The Pasadena–Deer Park tornado occurred during a small two-day tornado outbreak that produced 19 tornadoes across parts of Texas, Louisiana, and Florida from January 24th to January 25th. A few of the tornadoes were strong and caused significant damage, including an EF2 tornado that impacted the Orange, Texas area. Another EF2 tornado struck the small community of Gaytine, Louisiana. Eleven people were injured as a result of the outbreak.

=== January 24 event ===
List of confirmed tornadoes – Tuesday, January 24, 2023 (Note: All dates are based on the local time zone where the tornado touched down; however, all times are in Coordinated Universal Time for consistency.)
EF#	Location	County / Parish	State	Start Coord.	Time (UTC)	Path length	Max width
EF0	E of Needville to Sienna	Fort Bend	TX	29.3935°N 95.7429°W	19:45–20:30	14.57 mi (23.45 km)	100 yd (91 m)
EF0	Near Needville, a few manufactured homes sustained shingle and siding damage, a small metal security shed was overturned, and damage to trees and fences occurred. The tornado entered Sienna near the end of its path, inflicting additional tree and fence damage before dissipating. A portion of the damage path was unable to be surveyed due to it being on private property.						
EF0	Western Pearland	Brazoria	TX	29.5305°N 95.3742°W	20:10–20:25	2.45 mi (3.94 km)	50 yd (46 m)
EF0	Trees and fences were damaged, while 10 homes sustained minor roof and window damage.						
EF0	W of Wallisville	Chambers	TX	29.83°N 94.77°W	20:58-21:01	2.39 mi (3.85 km)	30 yd (27 m)
EF0	A short-lived tornado crossed I-10 and damaged some trees.						
EF2	SW of Nome	Liberty	TX	30.0016°N 94.4767°W	21:27–21:28	1.18 mi (1.90 km)	50 yd (46 m)
EF2	This strong tornado quickly developed and struck a home, which had its roof removed, windows shattered, and mud splattered on all sides of it. A storage shed had its roof blown off and a barn was destroyed, injuring a horse. Despite the short damage path, debris from the structures was lofted as far as at least 2 miles (3.2 km) to the north.						
EF1	Taylor Landing	Jefferson	TX	29.833°N 94.1996°W	22:05–22:12	5.5 mi (8.9 km)	75 yd (69 m)
EF1	This low-end EF1 tornado struck Taylor Landing. It mostly caused minor damage to roofs, uprooted trees, and destroyed fences.						
EF1	Northwestern Bridge City	Orange	TX	30.032°N 93.9084°W	22:23–22:29	2.25 mi (3.62 km)	75 yd (69 m)
EF1	Trees, roofs, and electrical transmission lines were damaged at the northwest edge of town. An RV trailer was overturned as well.						
EF2	W of Orangefield, TX to Northwestern Orange, TX to NNE of Vinton, LA	Orange (TX), Calcasieu (LA)	TX, LA	30.0741°N 93.8921°W	22:28–22:55	25.21 mi (40.57 km)	500 yd (460 m)
EF2	This strong tornado reached its peak intensity shortly after touching down near Orangefield, where some mobile homes were heavily damaged or destroyed, and a few frame homes suffered partial to total loss of their roofs. The tornado then weakened as it moved through the outskirts of Pinehurst and Orange, where multiple metal buildings, power poles, and trees were damaged, and homes suffered minor to moderate roof damage. A shop building and some outbuildings were also destroyed, and a stock trailer was flipped. The tornado then crossed the Sabine River into Louisiana. Several houses, RVs, and mobile homes were severely damaged, and two mobile homes were completely destroyed before the tornado dissipated. Numerous large trees were snapped, uprooted, or stripped of their limbs along the path. Two people were injured.						
EF1	NW of Vinton	Calcasieu	LA	30.2248°N 93.6475°W	22:44–22:46	1.39 mi (2.24 km)	75 yd (69 m)
EF1	Sections of roofing were ripped off a mobile home and an outbuilding, and trees were snapped. The tornado was a satellite to the above tornado and eventually merged with it.						
EF2	SE of DeQuincy to SSE of Ragley	Calcasieu, Beauregard	LA	30.3578°N 93.3634°W	23:05–23:18	12.43 mi (20.00 km)	300 yd (270 m)
EF2	This strong tornado touched and moved to the northeast, where power lines were downed and a few homes were damaged, including one that had a large part of its roof torn off, and another that was unroofed and sustained collapse of exterior walls. The tornado moved directly through the small community of Gaytine before dissipating, where several homes were damaged, two of which had their roofs completely torn off. A mobile home was rolled and destroyed, some outbuildings were also destroyed, and a metal building was heavily damaged. A fifth-wheel RV trailer was flipped over and numerous trees were snapped or uprooted as well, some of which fell on homes. Three people were injured.						
EF1	S Ragley to W of Reeves	Beauregard	LA	30.4612°N 93.2406°W	23:12–23:19	6.47 mi (10.41 km)	75 yd (69 m)
EF1	This tornado formed to the north of the tornado above and tracked over mostly open fields or forested areas. Some outbuildings and a shop building were damaged, power poles were leaned over, and trees were snapped or uprooted.						
EF1	Ventress	Pointe Coupee	LA	30.69°N 91.42°W	01:37–01:40	1.15 mi (1.85 km)	75 yd (69 m)
EF1	Three unanchored or poorly anchored mobile homes were destroyed by this brief low-end EF1 tornado. The first one, which was abandoned, was rolled while the second one was tossed into the third. Elsewhere in town, homes had shingle and siding damage, and some trees were downed as well. Three people were injured.						
EF1	NE of Bayou Cane	Lafourche	LA	29.6677°N 90.7027°W	04:01–04:09	3.2 mi (5.1 km)	75 yd (69 m)
EF1	An RV that was not tied down was flipped, and minor damage was inflicted to a nearby fence. A house had a large piece of roofing removed, while another home suffered minor damage. A barn was destroyed after being shifted off its foundation as well.						
EFU	WNW of Jean Lafitte	Jefferson	LA	29.75°N 90.15°W	04:55–04:58	2.91 mi (4.68 km)	100 yd (91 m)
EFU	A tornado was discovered after further analysis via high-resolution satellite imagery. The tornado appears to have started over Lake Salvador before moving into the Jean Lafitte National Historical Park and Preserve, where shrub damage could be seen on satellite. The tornado dissipated shortly after.						

=== January 25 event ===
List of confirmed tornadoes – Wednesday, January 25, 2023
EF#	Location	County / Parish	State	Start Coord.	Time (UTC)	Path length	Max width
EF0	NNE of Grayton Beach	Walton	FL	30.35°N 86.15°W	11:04-11:07	1.48 mi (2.38 km)	50 yd (46 m)
EF0	A brief TDS occurred on radar in a forested area, with only tree damaging being noted.						
EF0	N of Alys Beach	Walton	FL	30.3557°N 86.0433°W	11:15–11:17	0.57 mi (0.92 km)	75 yd (69 m)
EF0	This brief, weak tornado caused tree damage in a heavily wooded area.						
EF0	SE of Freeport to W of Ebro	Walton	FL	30.43°N 86.05°W	11:16-11:20	2.75 mi (4.43 km)	50 yd (46 m)
EF0	A tornado tracked through a forest, causing only tree damage.						
EF0	S of Estiffanulga	Liberty	FL	30.2885°N 85.0355°W	13:34–13:35	0.47 mi (0.76 km)	50 yd (46 m)
EF0	This brief tornado caused minor damage to a single-family home and flipped an adjacent outbuilding into a nearby tree line.						
EF1	SSW of Tallahassee	Leon	FL	30.3172°N 84.3812°W	15:23–15:27	3.24 mi (5.21 km)	550 yd (500 m)
EF1	Numerous trees were snapped or uprooted in the Apalachicola National Forest south of the Tallahassee International Airport.						

== See also ==
- List of United States tornadoes from January to February 2023
- List of North American tornadoes and tornado outbreaks
- Weather of 2023
