= Lawrenceville, Alabama =

Unincorporated community in Alabama, United States

- Unincorporated community
- Location within Alabama Location within the United States
- Coordinates: 31°39′28″N 85°16′09″W
- Country: United States
- State: Alabama
- County: Henry
- Elevation: 528 ft (161 m)
- Time zone: UTC-6 (Central (CST))
  - Summer (DST): UTC-5 (CDT)
- Area code: 334
- GNIS feature ID: 121437

Lawrenceville is an unincorporated community in Henry County, Alabama, United States. Lawrenceville is located off U.S. Route 431, 7.5 miles (12.1 km) north of Abbeville.

== History ==
Lawrenceville is named in honor of Joseph Lawrence, who served as the community's first postmaster. He also donated the land for the Lawrenceville Male and Female Academy. A post office operated under the name Lawrenceville from 1849 to 1905. The Lawrenceville Academy was incorporated by the Alabama Legislature on January 22, 1858, even though records show it was in operation prior to 1830. The academy closed during the Civil War and closed permanently in 1888.

Despite some of the opposition to the Compromise of 1850, there was a rally held in Lawrenceville to support its adoption.

== Notable people ==
- William C. Oates, 29th Governor of Alabama from 1894 to 1896, and a brigadier general in the U.S. Army during the Spanish–American War. Attended the Lawrenceville Academy, where he studied law
- Addie Anderson Wilson - composer
