= Stewart, Alabama =

Unincorporated community in Alabama, United States

- Unincorporated community
- Location within Alabama Location within the United States
- Coordinates: 32°54′40″N 87°42′22″W
- Country: United States
- State: Alabama
- County: Hale
- Elevation: 135 ft (41 m)
- Time zone: UTC-6 (Central (CST))
  - Summer (DST): UTC-5 (CDT)
- Area codes: 205, 659
- GNIS feature ID: 153571

Stewart, also known as Stewart's Station, is an unincorporated community in Hale County, Alabama, United States.

== History ==
Stewart was founded in 1844 as a stop on the Alabama Great Southern Railroad. It was first called Stewart's Station, in honor of an early settler of the area, Charlie Stewart. A post office operated under the name Stewart's Station from 1871 to 1903, and under the name Stewart from 1903 to 1982.

== Demographics ==
Historical population
Census	Pop.	Note	%±
1880	41		—
1890	255		522.0%
U.S. Decennial Census

Stewart's Station was listed on the 1880 & 1890 U.S. Censuses, having briefly been an incorporated community. It was no longer listed as a town beginning in 1900, except for the county precinct #16 that also bore its name from 1900 to 1950.
