= Roosterville, Georgia =

Unincorporated community in Georgia, U.S.

Coordinates: 33°24′12″N 85°11′02″W

Roosterville is an unincorporated community in Heard County, in the U.S. state of Georgia.

== History ==
Roosterville was founded in 1905, and according to tradition, was named for the frequent crowing of roosters on local farms.
