= Little Texas, Virginia =

- Unincorporated community
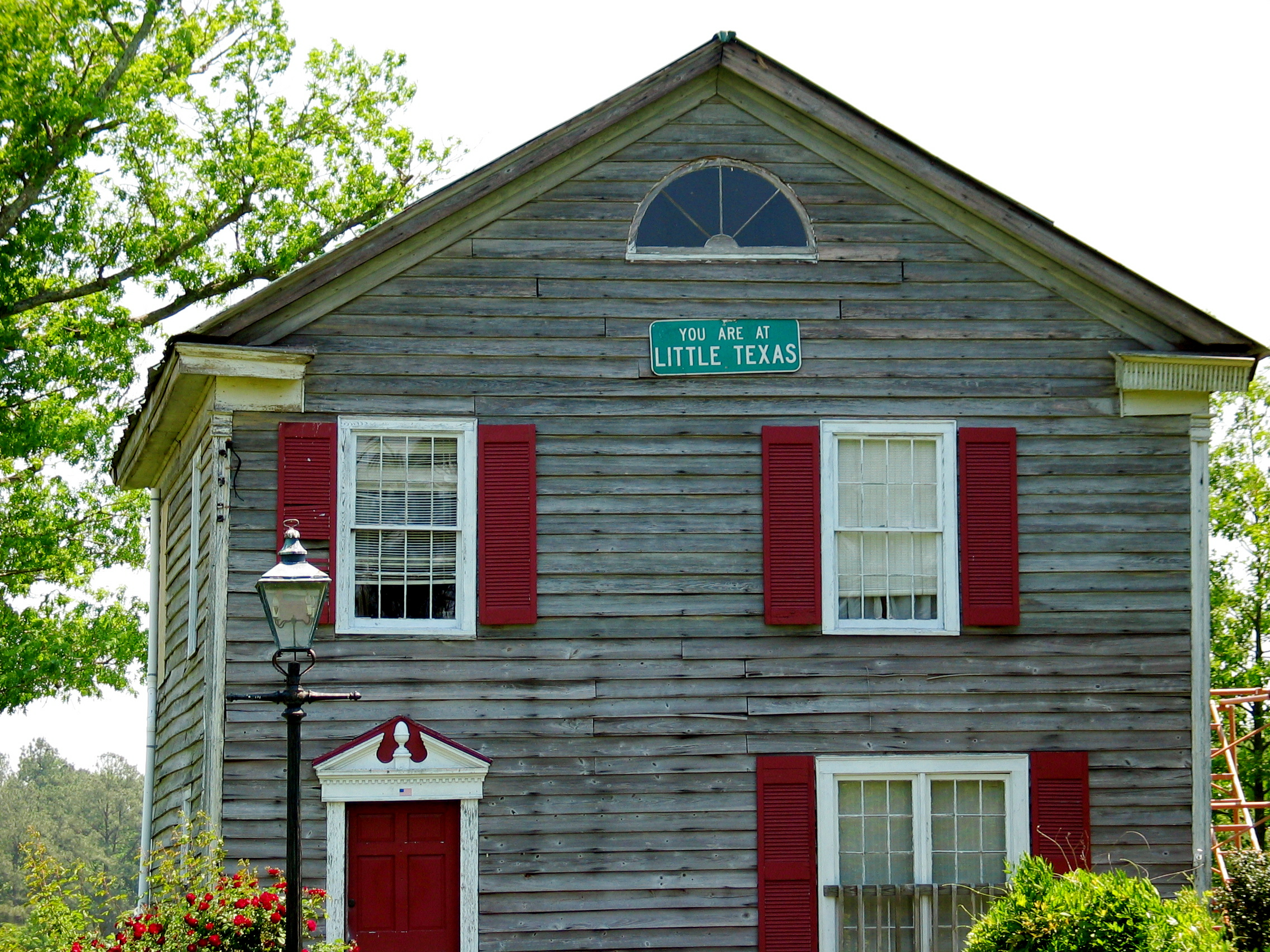

- Location within Virginia Location within the United States
- Coordinates: 36°36′08″N 77°20′22″W
- Country: United States
- State: Virginia
- County: Southampton
- Elevation: 75 ft (23 m)
- Time zone: UTC-5 (Eastern (EST))
  - Summer (DST): UTC-4 (EDT)
- Area codes: 757, 948
- GNIS feature ID: 1477493

Little Texas is an unincorporated community in southwestern Southampton County, Virginia, United States. It lies at an elevation of 75 feet (23 m).
